= 2025 Pennsylvania Senate District 36 special election =

- March 25, 2025

Pennsylvania Senate District 36
- Turnout: 29.31%
Candidate	James Andrew Malone	Josh Parsons
Party	Democratic	Republican
Popular vote	27,034	26,508
Percentage	49.99%	49.02%
- Results by precinct Malone: 40–50% 50–60% 60–70% 70–80% Parsons: 40–50% 50–60% 60–70% 70–80%
Representative before election
Ryan Aument
Republican
Elected Representative
James Andrew Malone
Democratic

A special election to determine the member of the Pennsylvania Senate for its 36th district was held on March 25, 2025. The election filled a vacancy caused by the resignation of Republican senator Ryan Aument on December 31, 2024. Prior to the special election, Republicans held a 27–22 advantage in the chamber. Democrat James Andrew Malone flipped the seat in what was considered a major upset, (Note: Attributed to multiple sources:) as Republican presidential nominee Donald Trump won the 36th district by 15 points in 2024.

== Background ==
Pennsylvania's 36th senatorial district and Lancaster County have both been areas historically dominated by the Republican Party. The last state senator of the Democratic Party from the county, John S. Hoover, was elected in 1890, and the last Democrat to represent the district was in 1979, when the district's boundaries were changed to cover Lancaster County rather than Philadelphia. In the 2024 United States presidential election, Republican candidate Donald Trump won the 36th district by 15 points. As of March 25, 2025, Republicans have a heavy party affiliation advantage in Senate District 36, with 97,834 registered Republicans comprising 53.0% of the district's 184,569 registered voters. Only 55,243 voters, or 29.9%, are registered Democrats.

Republican Ryan Aument, the incumbent senator representing the 36th district, was selected on December 10, 2024, by U.S. Senator-elect Dave McCormick to serve as his state director. McCormick, a fellow Republican, had narrowly defeated the Democratic incumbent Bob Casey Jr. by just 0.2 percentage points the preceding month following an automatic recount. Aument was first elected to the State Senate in 2014 with over 72% of the total vote. He was re-elected in 2018 with over 66% of the vote and in 2022 unopposed. Aument officially resigned on December 31, 2024, and, on January 7, Austin Davis—the lieutenant governor of Pennsylvania—scheduled the special election to replace Aument for March 25, 2025.

== Candidate selection process ==
=== Democratic Party nomination ===
On January 3, 2025, Matthew Good announced his candidacy for the Democratic nomination for the 36th district.

James Andrew Malone, seven-year mayor of East Petersburg, joined the race through an announcement made by the Lancaster County Democratic Committee on January

Members of the Lancaster County Democratic Committee who resided in the 36th district met virtually to select their candidate on January 18. Two-thirds of the committee voted in favor of Malone. Good endorsed Malone's general election campaign following the vote.

=== Republican Party nomination ===
Aument had recommended to State Representative Mindy Fee that she run for the State Senate. Fee originally said that she was considering a run; however, she ultimately decided against so, stating that Republicans "can produce a wealth of good candidates." On December 26, 2024, Josh Parsons, a member of the Lancaster County Board of Commissioners, announced his campaign for the Republican nomination to represent the 36th district through social media. In the weeks preceding his announcement, he privately called several members of the Lancaster County Republican Committee, requesting for their endorsement. Parsons received an endorsement from Lloyd Smucker, the U.S. representative for Pennsylvania's 11th congressional district. Brett Miller, another Pennsylvania state representative, announced his candidacy for the Senate seat on January 2, 2025. Shortly before the deadline on January 3, two other Republicans filed for the office: Steven Heffner, a mathematics teacher at J. P. McCaskey High School; and Brad Witmer, a retired truck driver. Both Parsons and Miller were seen as frontrunners for the position.

Informal straw polls, held on January 7 and 8, showed Parsons as the sole frontrunner for the nomination; he received 98 votes, compared to Miller at second place with 68 votes. Heffner had one vote, while Witmer had no votes. Later straw polls conducted revealed Parsons had enough non-binding votes to secure the necessary majority to win the nomination—114 votes out of 207—compared to Miller's 80 votes; both Heffner and Witmer received one vote each. Despite poor performance in the straw polls, Miller vowed to remain in the race. On January 25, Parsons was formally selected as the Republican's nominee for the general election by the Lancaster County Republican Committee. Miller endorsed Parsons and stated that he would help Parsons campaign.

=== Libertarian Party nomination ===
The Lancaster County chapter of the Libertarian Party announced Zachary Moore, a geographic information system analyst, as their candidate for the special election on January 17, 2025.

== General election ==
=== Results ===
2025 Pennsylvania Senate special election, District 36
Party	Candidate	Votes	%
Democratic	James Andrew Malone	27,034	49.99
Republican	Josh Parsons	26,508	49.02
Libertarian	Zachary Moore	483	0.89
Write-in		52	0.10
Total votes		54,077	100.00
Democratic gain from Republican			

== Note and references ==
Note
