= Pennsylvania House of Representatives, District 41 =

American legislative district

Pennsylvania's 41st State House of Representatives district
Representative
Brett Miller; R–Lancaster
- Population (2022): 64,434

The 41st Pennsylvania House of Representatives District is located in southern Pennsylvania and has been represented since 2015 by Brett Miller.

It appears that Brad Chambers (D) - is the likely representative elect for 2027 after the November 2026 "BLUE wave," ending Mr. Miller's long tenure in the House.

== District profile ==
The 41st Pennsylvania House of Representatives District is located in Lancaster County and includes the following areas:

- Columbia
- East Hempfield Township
- Manor Township (part)
  - District Bethel
  - District Hambright
  - District West Lancaster
- Mountville
- West Hempfield Township

== Representatives ==
Representative	Party	Years	District home	Note
Prior to 1969, seats were apportioned by county.
Joseph V. Zord, Jr.	Republican	1969 – 1980		
Robert F. Frazier	Republican	1981 – 1982		
Raymond T. Book	Republican	1983 – 1988		
Ralph E. Kaiser	Democrat	1989 – 2002		
District moved from Allegheny County to Lancaster County in 2002.
Katie True	Republican	2003 – 2010	East Hempfield Township	Previously represented the 37th district, which True resigned to run for Pennsylvania Auditor General
Ryan Aument	Republican	2011 – 2014	West Hempfield Township	Elected to Pennsylvania Senate, District 36 in 2014
Brett Miller	Republican	2015 – present	East Hempfield Township	Incumbent

== Recent election results ==
PA House election, 2024: Pennsylvania House, District 41
Party	Candidate	Votes	%
Republican	Brett Miller (incumbent)	19,926	55.67
Democratic	Brad Chambers	15,870	44.33
Total votes		35,796	100.00
Republican hold			

PA House election, 2022: Pennsylvania House, District 41
Party	Candidate	Votes	%
Republican	Brett Miller (incumbent)	18,402	75.09
Libertarian	Favyan Asia	6,105	24.91
Total votes		24,507	100.00
Republican hold			

PA House election, 2020: Pennsylvania House, District 41
Party	Candidate	Votes	%
Republican	Brett Miller (incumbent)	23,230	57.87
Democratic	Michele Wherley	16,912	42.13
Total votes		40,142	100.00
Republican hold			

PA House election, 2018: Pennsylvania House, District 41
Party	Candidate	Votes	%
Republican	Brett Miller (incumbent)	16,951	56.27
Democratic	Michele Wherley	13,173	43.73
Total votes		30,124	100.00
Republican hold			

PA House election, 2016: Pennsylvania House, District 41
Party	Candidate	Votes	%
Republican	Brett Miller (incumbent)	21,537	61.95
Democratic	Nicholas Selch	13,227	38.05
Total votes		34,764	100.00
Republican hold			
