= Philip Price =

Philip Price may also refer to:

- Philip Price (musician), American singer and songwriter
- Phillip Price (born 1966), Welsh golfer
- Philip Price (programmer), American computer programmer
- Phillip Price Jr. (born 1934), Pennsylvania politician
- Phil Price (sculptor) (born 1965), New Zealand sculptor
- Phil Price (rugby union) (born 1988), Welsh rugby union player
- Philip Price (c.1945–1972), British soldier killed in Belfast's Bloody Friday bombings
- Phil Price (Canadian football) (born 1949), Canadian football player
