= Gordon Denlinger =

American politician

Gordon R. Denlinger

Member of the Pennsylvania House of Representatives from the 99th district
- In office March 18, 2003 – January 6, 2015
- Preceded by: Leroy Zimmerman
- Succeeded by: David H. Zimmerman

Personal details
- Party: Republican
- Spouse: Carolyn Hastie Denlinger
- Education: Bob Jones University

Gordon R. Denlinger is a former Republican member of the Pennsylvania House of Representatives (2003–2015). In December 2017, he entered the 2018 race for Lieutenant Governor of Pennsylvania, dropping out in February 2018.

== Early life and education ==
Denlinger was born in Ephrata, Pennsylvania, on July 16, 1963. He graduated from High Point Baptist Academy in 1981. He graduated Bob Jones University with a B.S. in accounting in 1985.

== Career before politics ==
Denliger is an accountant and CPA. He was an assistant controller at Newell Rubbermaid Graco Children's Products Division and controller at Sharp Shopper, Inc.

== Political career ==
Denlinger represented the 99th District (within Lancaster County) of the Pennsylvania House for nearly 12 full years after winning a special election on March 18, 2003, to fill the remainder of Leroy Zimmerman's term.

Denlinger was a member of the House Agriculture and Rural Affairs, Appropriations, Finance and Tourism Committees. He also served as the Republican Chair of the Subcommittee on Fiscal Policy for the House Appropriations Committee, Vice-Chair of the Finance Committee, and Co-Chair of the Jobs Creation Working Group under the Republican Policy Committee.

In the state House, Denlinger had a "pro-business, socially conservative" voting record. He opposes the legal recognition of same-sex marriage and supports the privatization of alcohol sales in Pennsylvania. He supported legislation to eliminate school property taxes but raise the state sales tax (from 6% to 7%) and the state income tax (3.07% to 4.34%). He describes himself as a "strong school choice advocate."

In 2014, Denlinger sought his party's nomination for the Pennsylvania Senate instead of running for re-election in the House, but lost the primary in the 36th District to Ryan Aument, who went on to win that seat in the general election. Fellow Republican David H. Zimmerman won Denlinger's former seat in the 99th district. In 2016, Denlinger was named by the Republican Party of Pennsylvania as one of three delegates to the Republican National Convention from the state's 16th congressional district.

On December 18, 2017, Denlinger announced via a letter to Pennsylvania's Republican Party members that he was entering the 2018 race for Lieutenant Governor. Denlinger would have faced businessman Jeff Bartos and others in the Republican primary, though he dropped out of the race in February 2018.

== Election results ==
- 2003 special election for Pennsylvania House representative from 99th District

Name	Votes	Percent	Outcome
Gordon R. Delinger, Rep.	3,335	70.2%	Won
Bernadette C. Johnson, Dem.	1,347	28.4%	Lost

- 2004 race for Pennsylvania House representative from 99th District

Name	Votes	Percent	Outcome
Gordon R. Denlinger, Rep.	18,757	100%	Won
(No other candidates)

- 2006 race for Pennsylvania House representative from 99th District

Name	Votes	Percent	Outcome
Gordon Denlinger, Rep.	12,114	74.4%	Won
Ginny Diilio	4,168	25.6%	Lost

- 2008 race for Pennsylvania House representative from 99th District

Name	Votes	Percent	Outcome
Gordon R. Denlinger, Rep.	19,505	100%	Won
(No other candidates)

- 2010 race for Pennsylvania House representative from 99th District

Name	Votes	Percent	Outcome
Gordon Denlinger, Rep.	14,202	100%	Won
(No other candidates)

- 2012 race for Republican House representative from the 99th District

Name	Votes	Percent	Outcome
Gordon Denlinger, Rep.	19,198	100%	Won
(No other candidates)

- 2014 Republican primary for Pennsylvania State Senator from the 36th District

Name	Votes	Percent	Outcome
Ryan P. Aument, Rep.	10,187	61.4%	Won
Gordon Denlinger, Rep.	6,381	38.5%	Lost

== Personal life ==
Denlinger and his family are members of Zeltenreich Reformed Church in New Holland, where he has served as an elder. Formerly named Covenant Reformed, the church merged with Zeltenreich UCC in 2011. Denlinger and his wife reside in Narvon, Pennsylvania and have four children: Evan, Abram Preston, Blake, and Mariah.

Denlinger's brother-in-law is Sam Rohrer, who previously was a state representative from Berks County, Pennsylvania.
