= Brett Miller =

Brett Miller may refer to:

- Brett Miller (American football)
- Brett Miller (politician)
