= David H. Zimmerman =

American politician (born 1956)

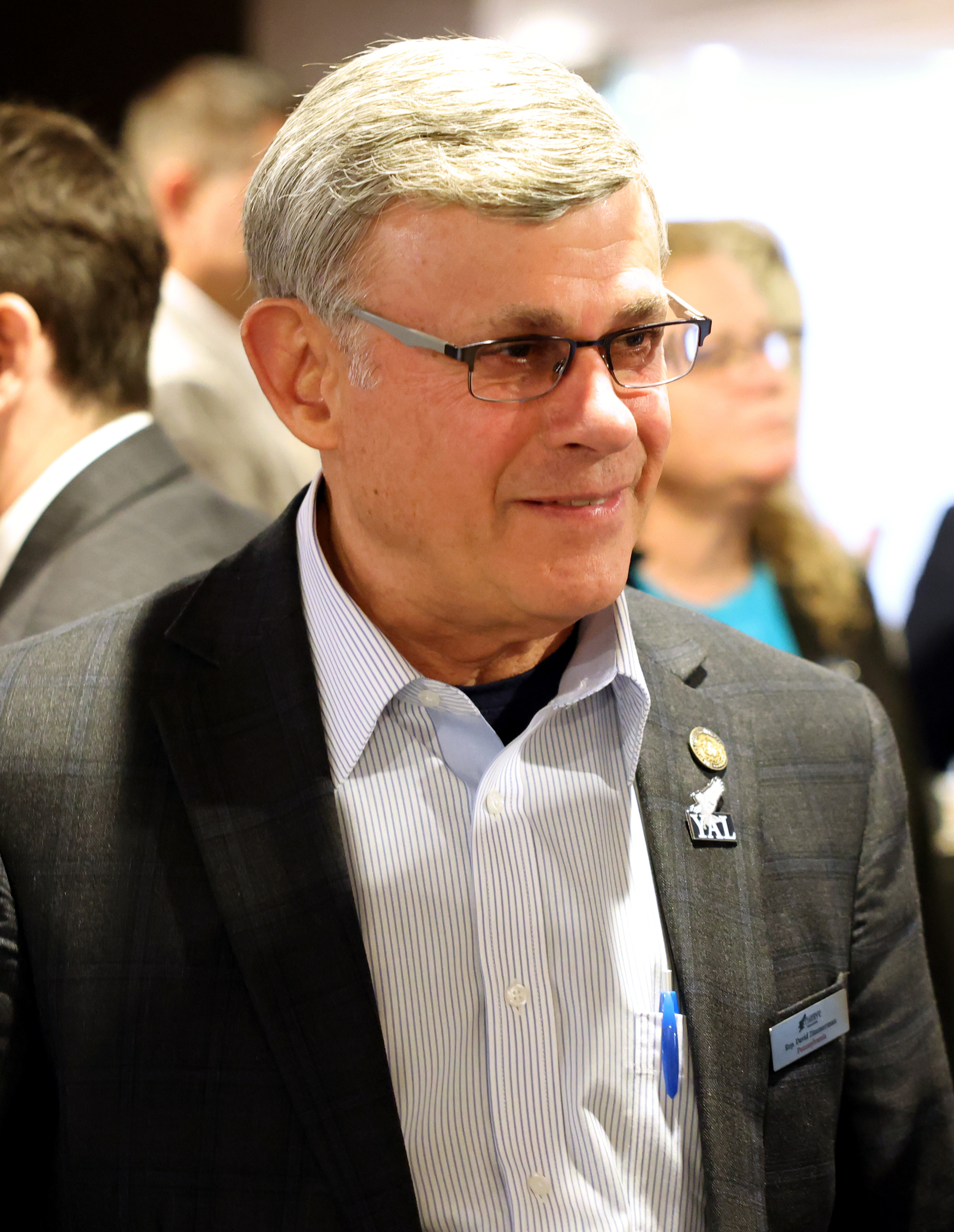
- Zimmerman at the 2024 Hazlitt Summit hosted by Young Americans for Liberty Foundation

Member of the Pennsylvania House of Representatives from the 99th district
- Incumbent
- Assumed office January 6, 2015
- Preceded by: Gordon Denlinger

Personal details
- Born: April 13, 1956 (age 70) Narvon, Pennsylvania, U.S.
- Party: Republican
- Spouse: Ruth Ann
- Children: 3

David H. Zimmerman (born April 13, 1956) is an American politician and current member of the Pennsylvania House of Representatives, representing the 99th District.

== Biography ==
Zimmerman was born on April 13, 1956, in Narvon, Pennsylvania, and grew up on a dairy farm.

Zimmerman served in several positions in his native Lancaster County, Pennsylvania, including as chairman of the board of supervisors of East Earl Township.

=== Pennsylvania House of Representatives ===
Zimmerman was first elected the represent the 99th District in the Pennsylvania House of Representatives in 2014. He was re-elected in 2016, 2018, 2020, 2022, and 2024.

In 2020, Zimmerman was among 26 Pennsylvania House Republicans who called for the reversal of Joe Biden's certification as the winner of Pennsylvania's electoral votes in the 2020 United States presidential election, citing false claims of election irregularities.

In May 2022, GOP leadership removed Zimmerman from all but one of his committees after he supported a primary challenger running against state Senator Ryan Aument.

In a speech on September 24, 2022, in support of Doug Mastriano, Zimmerman told the crowd he had received a subpoena from the FBI regarding the January 6 United States Capitol attack, claiming that "the FBI looked for me all day long, but what I did that they didn't know is, I turned my phone tracker off."

He is a member of the Pennsylvania Freedom Caucus.

== Personal life ==
Zimmerman resides in East Earl Township, Lancaster County, Pennsylvania, with his wife, Ruth Ann. They have three children and seven grandchildren.

== Electoral history ==
2014 Pennsylvania House of Representatives election, 99th District
Party	Candidate	Votes	%
Republican	David H. Zimmerman	9,974	71.08
Democratic	Bryan Sanguinito	4,014	28.61
Write-in		44	0.31
Total votes		14,032	100.00

2016 Pennsylvania House of Representatives election, 99th District
Party	Candidate	Votes	%
Republican	David H. Zimmerman (incumbent)	17,945	74.15
Democratic	Duane A. Groff	6,219	25.70
Write-in		38	0.16
Total votes		24,202	100.00

2018 Pennsylvania House of Representatives election, 99th District
Party	Candidate	Votes	%
Republican	David Zimmerman (incumbent)	14,328	71.30
Democratic	Elizabeth Malarkey	5,731	28.52
Write-in		37	0.18
Total votes		20,096	100.00

2020 Pennsylvania House of Representatives election, 99th District
Party	Candidate	Votes	%
Republican	David Zimmerman (incumbent)	21,144	73.25
Democratic	Rick Hodge	7,667	26.56
Write-in		56	0.19
Total votes		28,867	100.00

2022 Pennsylvania House of Representatives election, 99th District
Party	Candidate	Votes	%
Republican	David Zimmerman (incumbent)	13,538	76.31
Democratic	Joshua Caltagirone	4,177	23.55
Write-in		25	0.14
Total votes		17,740	100.00
