= James Malone (American politician) =

American politician

Member of the Pennsylvania Senate from the 36th district
- Incumbent
- Assumed office May 5, 2025
- Preceded by: Ryan Aument

Mayor of East Petersburg, Pennsylvania
- In office 2017 – April 30, 2025
- Preceded by: Jeff Geoghan
- Succeeded by: Bill Trovato

Personal details
- Born: James Andrew Malone; 1973 or 1974 (age 52–53)
- Party: Democratic
- Education: Northwest College (AA); Lee University (BA)

James Andrew Malone (born 1973 or 1974) is an American politician who has served as a member of the Pennsylvania Senate from the 36th district since 2025. A Democrat, he was first elected in a March 2025 special election to succeed Republican senator Ryan Aument, who resigned in December 2024. Malone previously served as mayor of East Petersburg, Pennsylvania.

== Political career ==
Malone was elected Mayor of East Petersburg, Pennsylvania in 2017, facing no opponents in the Democratic primary or the general election. He was reelected, again with no opponents, in 2021.

On December 31, 2024, Republican Ryan Aument resigned from representing the 36th district in the Pennsylvania Senate to become state director for Dave McCormick, who had been elected in the 2024 United States Senate election in Pennsylvania. The 36th district covers much of Lancaster County, including East Petersburg. The seat was historically Republican, voting for Donald Trump by 15 points in the 2024 election. Malone ran for the seat as a Democrat, facing Republican Lancaster County Commissioner Josh Parsons. He narrowly defeated Parsons, flipping the seat in what was considered a significant upset.

For the 2025–2026 Session Malone sits on the following committees in the State Senate:

- Game & Fisheries (Minority Chair)
- Aging & Youth
- Agriculture & Rural Affairs
- Communications & Technology
- Local Government

== Electoral history ==
2017 East Petersburg mayoral Democratic primary election
Party	Candidate	Votes	%
Democratic	James Andrew Malone	196	99.49
Write-in		1	0.51
Total votes		197	100.0

2017 East Petersburg mayoral election
Party	Candidate	Votes	%
Democratic	James Andrew Malone	486	95.11
Write-in		25	4.89
Total votes		511	100.0
Democratic gain from Republican			

2021 East Petersburg mayoral Democratic primary election
Party	Candidate	Votes	%
Democratic	James Andrew Malone (incumbent)	319	99.69
Write-in		1	0.31
Total votes		320	100.0

2021 East Petersburg mayoral election
Party	Candidate	Votes	%
Democratic	James Andrew Malone (incumbent)	691	90.80
Write-in		70	9.20
Total votes		761	100.0
Democratic hold			

2025 Pennsylvania Senate District 36 special election
Party	Candidate	Votes	%
Democratic	James Andrew Malone	27,034	49.99
Republican	Josh Parsons	26,508	49.02
Libertarian	Zachary Moore	483	0.89
Write-in		52	0.10
Total votes		54,077	100.00
Democratic gain from Republican			
