= Grings =

Grings may refer to:

- Dadeus Grings (1936–2026), Brazilian bishop
- Inka Grings (born 1978), German football player
- Marlon Grings (born 1976), Brazilian canoer

== See also ==
- Harry Gring (1918–1992), American politician
