= Thomas J. McCormack =

American politician

Member of the Pennsylvania Senate from the 36th district
- In office April 3, 1978 – November 30, 1978
- Preceded by: Lewis Hill
- Succeeded by: Phillip Price, Jr.

Member of the Pennsylvania House of Representatives from the Philadelphia County district
- In office 1953–1962

Personal details
- Born: September 28, 1922
- Died: August 18, 1998 (aged 75)

Thomas J. McCormack (September 28, 1922 – August 18, 1998) was a member of the Pennsylvania State Senate, serving during 1978. He also served in the Pennsylvania House of Representatives.
