= Emil Mrkonic =

American politician

Member of the Pennsylvania House of Representatives from the 37th district
- In office 1975–1992
- Preceded by: John T. Walsh
- Succeeded by: Katie True

Personal details
- Born: July 26, 1927 McKeesport, Pennsylvania
- Died: November 23, 2002 (aged 75) McKeesport, Pennsylvania
- Party: Democratic

Emil Mrkonic (July 26, 1927 – November 23, 2002) was a former Democratic member of the Pennsylvania House of Representatives.
