= Ralph Kaiser =

American politician

Ralph E. Kaiser

Member of the Pennsylvania House of Representatives from the 41st district
- In office January 3, 1989 – November 30, 2002
- Preceded by: Raymond T. Book
- Succeeded by: Katie True

Personal details
- Born: August 27, 1950 (age 75) Pittsburgh, Pennsylvania
- Party: Democratic
- Spouse: Susan

Ralph E. Kaiser (born August 27, 1950) is a former Democratic member of the Pennsylvania House of Representatives.

== Biography ==
Kaiser earned a degree from Robert Morris College in 1973. He worked at the U.S. Steel Duquesne Works for eleven years before its closure in 1984. He worked two jobs for the next four years before successfully challenging incumbent Republican Raymond T. Book in a district that had been controlled by Republicans since its creation.

In 1989, he earned a certificate in Effective Resource Management from Penn State University.

In 1988, he challenged incumbent Republican Raymond T. Book, who had represented the 41st legislative district for three terms. Kaiser obtained a $4,400 loan against his car, printed 30,000 pieces of literature, and began knocking on doors throughout the district, missing only 4 days between July 3 and the general election. He won the election by 168 votes.

His legislative career was marked by his "political independence" and his ability to secure millions of dollars in state grants for his district. He voted against then-Gov. Robert Casey's 1991-92 budget, which included a $3 billion tax increase in and increased state spending by 12 percent, a move that angered the Democratic leadership. In 1993, he was lauded by Common Cause as one of thirteen Democratic "Untouchables" for his efforts to reform the business of the House.

One of Kaiser's most notable legislative accomplishments was a bill to reform the state's humane officers. At one hearing, Kaiser held his own badge, handcuffs, and Pennsylvania Humane Society ticket book above his head to dramatize the lax requirements within the system and the need to keep unqualified officers like himself off farms and out of people's doghouses. He explained that in order to become a humane officer himself, he had "filed two forms with the Department of State, spent 10 minutes and $100," and only needed to be sworn in by a judge in order to become a humane officer, endowed with the authority to wear a uniform, carry a gun, and write tickets costing pet owners as much as $600 in fines, all without any training, supervision, or real knowledge of animals. he said that "I never even owned a dog," he said. "And the closest I've ever come was to pet one owned by someone else."

He retired prior to the 2002 elections when his Allegheny County district was moved to Lancaster County as retribution by the House Democratic caucus and Bill DeWeese for his vote against the 1991-1992 budget and his overall fiscally conservative voting pattern. He took a position as director of government affairs for the Pittsburgh-based public television station WQED.
