= Mike Brubaker =

American politician

Michael W. Brubaker
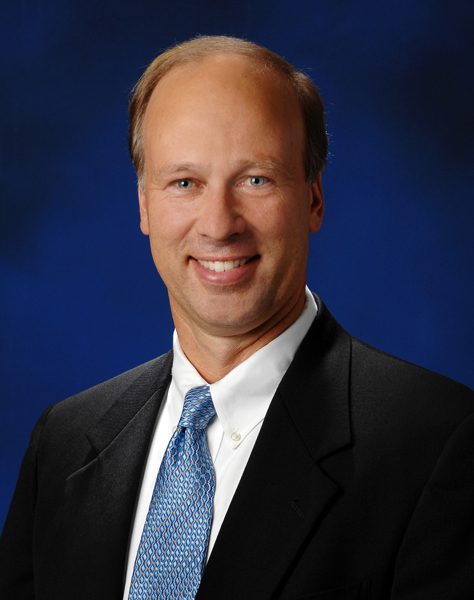
- Senator Brubaker

Member of the Pennsylvania Senate from the 36th district
- In office January 2, 2007 – January 6, 2015
- Preceded by: Noah Wenger
- Succeeded by: Ryan Aument

Personal details
- Born: 1958 (age 67–68) Lancaster, PA
- Party: Republican
- Spouse: Cindy Aspril
- Education: West Virginia University
- Profession: agronomist/CEO
- Website: Pennsylvania State Senator Michael Brubaker

Michael W. Brubaker (born 1958) is an American politician and member of the Republican Party. He served in the Pennsylvania State Senate, representing the 36th District from 2007 until his retirement in 2015.

== Biography ==
Brubaker is a member of the Ephrata Area Chamber of Commerce, the National Rifle Association of America, the Millcreek Sportsmen Club, the Cooper Hill Sportsmen Club, the Farm Foundation and Bennett Round Table, Lancaster Evangelical Church, the Millport Conservancy, Penn-Ag Industries, the Pennsylvania Energy Advisory Board, the Pennsylvania Farm Bureau, the Lititz Dinner Club, and the Pennsylvania Grange.

He has received multiple honors, including the National Conservation Tillage Consultant of the Year Award in 1990, the Jaycees Outstanding Young Community Leader in 1991, the National Communicator of the Year Award in 1991, the United States Environmental Protection Agency's National Administrators Award in 1991, the Agricultural Consultant of the Year in 1994, the Future Farmers of America Award in 1997, the Crop Professionals Hall of Fame award in 1998, and was a member of the Who's Who Leading American Executives list in 1992 and the Who's Who in the East list of 1995.

== Electoral history ==
Pennsylvania Senate elections, 2006
Party	Candidate	Votes	%	±%
Republican	Michael W. Brubaker	48,660	65.7%	
Democratic	Jason A. Leisey	25,403	34.3%	

Pennsylvania Senate elections, 2010
Party	Candidate	Votes	%	±%
Republican	Michael W. Brubaker	65,163	99.1%	

Pennsylvania State Senate
Preceded by Noah Wenger	Member of the Pennsylvania Senate for the 36th District; 2007–2015	Succeeded by Ryan Aument
