= Pennsylvania House of Representatives, District 37 =

American legislative district

Pennsylvania's 37th State House of Representatives district
Representative
| Mindy Fee; R–Manheim |
- Population (2022): 66,593

The 37th Pennsylvania House of Representatives District is located in southeast Pennsylvania and has been represented since 2013 by Mindy Fee.

== District profile ==
The 37th Pennsylvania House of Representatives District is located in Lancaster County and includes the following areas:

- Clay Township
- Elizabeth Township
- Lititz
- Manheim
- Penn Township
- Rapho Township
- Warwick Township

== Representatives ==
| Representative | Party | Years | District home | Note |
Prior to 1969, seats were apportioned by county.
| John T. Walsh | Democrat | 1969 – 1974 | | |
| Emil Mrkonic | Democrat | 1975 – 1992 | | |
District moved from Allegheny County to Lancaster County after 1992
| Katie True | Republican | 1993 – 2000 | | Retired to run for Pennsylvania Auditor General; later represented the 41st district |
| Tom Creighton | Republican | 2001 – 2012 | Rapho Township | |
| Mindy Fee | Republican | 2013 - | Manheim | Incumbent |

== Recent election results ==
PA House election, 2024: Pennsylvania House, District 37
| Party | Candidate | Votes | % |
|---|---|---|---|
| Republican | Mindy Fee (incumbent) | 26,131 | 66.77 |
| Democratic | John George | 13,002 | 33.23 |
| Total votes | | 39,133 | 100.00 |
| Republican hold | | | |

PA House election, 2022: Pennsylvania House, District 37
| Party | Candidate | Votes | % |
|---|---|---|---|
| Republican | Mindy Fee (incumbent) | Unopposed | |
| Total votes | | 25,535 | 100.00 |
| Republican hold | | | |

PA House election, 2020: Pennsylvania House, District 37
| Party | Candidate | Votes | % |
|---|---|---|---|
| Republican | Mindy Fee (incumbent) | 25,783 | 72.91 |
| Democratic | John Padora | 9,579 | 27.09 |
| Total votes | | 35,362 | 100.00 |
| Republican hold | | | |

PA House election, 2018: Pennsylvania House, District 37
| Party | Candidate | Votes | % |
|---|---|---|---|
| Republican | Mindy Fee (incumbent) | 18,510 | 72.66 |
| Democratic | Suzanne Delahunt | 6,964 | 27.34 |
| Total votes | | 25,474 | 100.00 |
| Republican hold | | | |

PA House election, 2016: Pennsylvania House, District 37
| Party | Candidate | Votes | % |
|---|---|---|---|
| Republican | Mindy Fee (incumbent) | Unopposed | |
| Total votes | | 25,672 | 100.00 |
| Republican hold | | | |

PA House election, 2014: Pennsylvania House, District 37
| Party | Candidate | Votes | % |
|---|---|---|---|
| Republican | Mindy Fee (incumbent) | 14,078 | 77.53 |
| Democratic | Brian Kresge | 4,081 | 22.47 |
| Total votes | | 18,159 | 100.00 |
| Republican hold | | | |

PA House election, 2012: Pennsylvania House, District 37
| Party | Candidate | Votes | % |
|---|---|---|---|
| Republican | Mindy Fee | 20,999 | 73.14 |
| Democratic | Russell Stahley | 7,713 | 26.86 |
| Total votes | | 28,712 | 100.00 |
| Republican hold | | | |

PA House election, 2010: Pennsylvania House, District 37
| Party | Candidate | Votes | % |
|---|---|---|---|
| Republican | Tom Creighton (incumbent) | Unopposed | |
| Total votes | | 17,650 | 100.00 |
| Republican hold | | | |
