= 2000 Pennsylvania Auditor General election =

- November 7, 2000
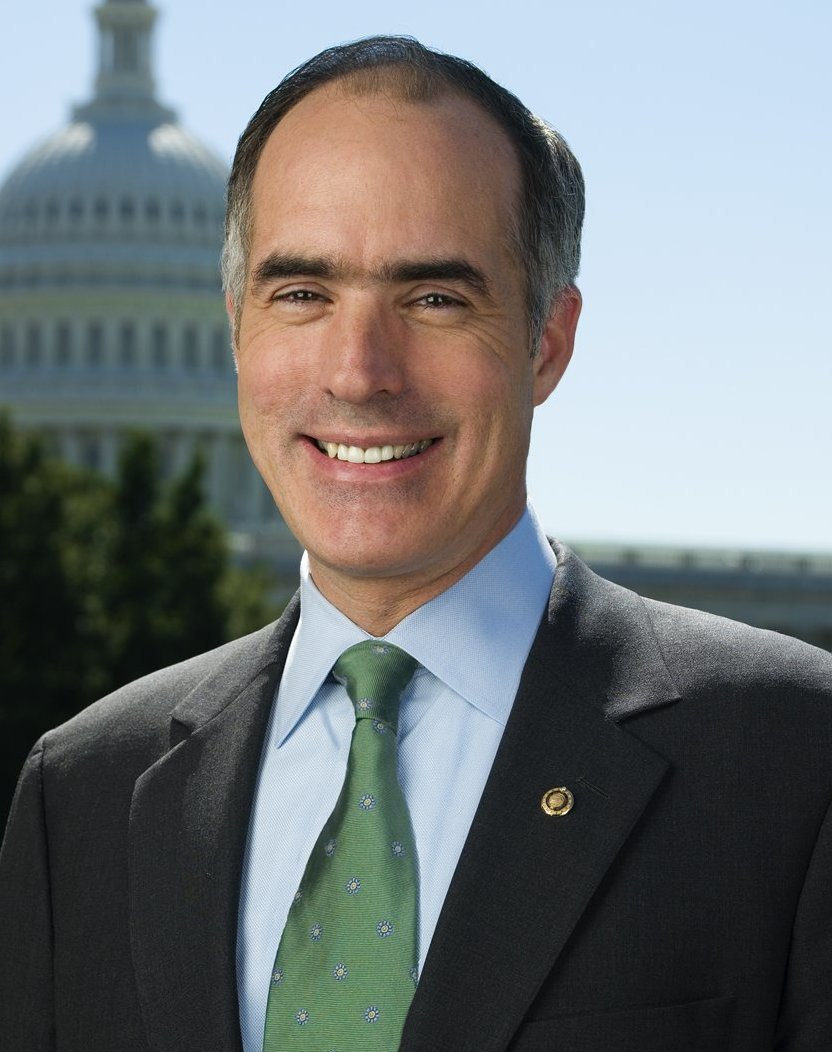

Nominee	Bob Casey Jr.	Katie True
Party	Democratic	Republican
Popular vote	2,651,551	1,862,934
Percentage	56.84%	39.94%
- County results Casey: 40–50% 50–60% 60–70% 70–80% 80–90% True: 40-50% 50-60% 60-70%
Auditor General before election
Bob Casey, Jr.
Democratic
Elected Auditor General
Bob Casey, Jr.
Democratic

Pennsylvania's Auditor General election was held November 7, 2000. Incumbent Democrat Bob Casey won reelection by a healthy margin. His Republican challenger was Katie True, a State Representative from the Lancaster area. Both candidates were unopposed in the primary.

== General election ==
Pennsylvania Auditor General election, 2000
Party	Candidate	Votes	%
Democratic	Bob Casey, Jr. (incumbent)	2,651,551	56.8
Republican	Katie True	1,862,934	39.9
Green	Anne Goeke	62,642	1.3
Libertarian	Jessica Morris	41,967	0.9
Constitution	John Rhine	23,971	0.5
Reform	James Blair	21,476	0.5
Democratic hold			
