= Samuel N. Mumma Tobacco Warehouse =

- U.S. National Register of Historic Places
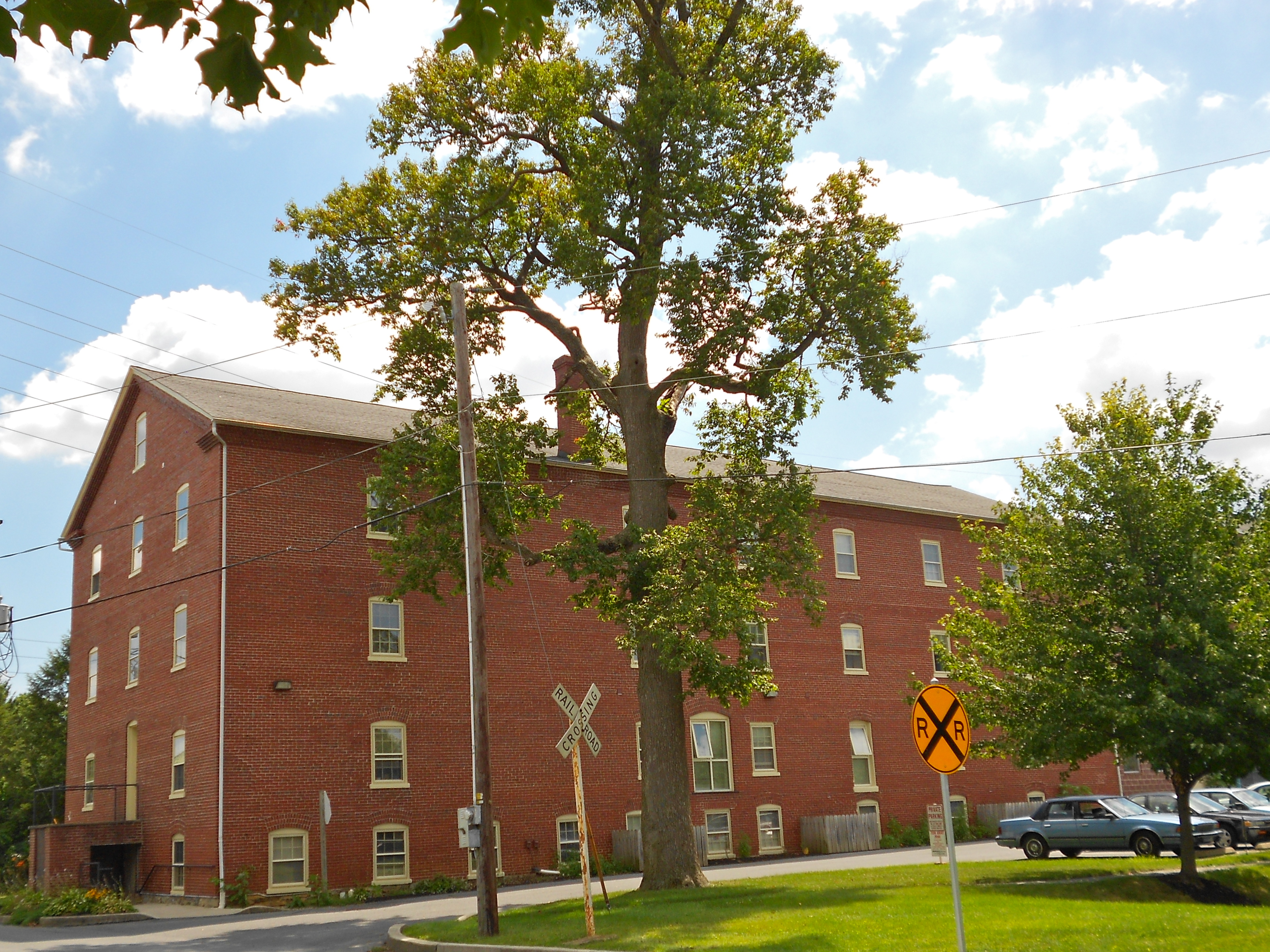

- Location within Pennsylvania Location within the United States
- Location: Elizabeth Street junction with Barbara Avenue, Landisville, East Hempfield Township, Pennsylvania
- Coordinates: 40°5′46″N 76°25′8″W
- Area: 1.6 acres (0.65 ha)
- Built: c. 1914
- NRHP reference No.: 97000517
- Added to NRHP: May 30, 1997

Samuel N. Mumma Tobacco Warehouse is a historic tobacco warehouse located at East Hempfield Township, Lancaster County, Pennsylvania. It was built about 1914, and is a three-story, three bay by ten bay, rectangular brick building. It has a gable roof and sits on a limestone foundation. It was built for the processing and storage of cigar leaf tobacco.

It was listed on the National Register of Historic Places in 1997.
