= Katie True =

American politician (1941–2025)

Member of the Pennsylvania House of Representatives from the 41st district
- In office January 7, 2003 – November 30, 2010
- Preceded by: Ralph Kaiser
- Succeeded by: Ryan Aument

Member of the Pennsylvania House of Representatives from the 37th district
- In office January 5, 1993 – November 30, 2000
- Preceded by: Emil Mrkonic
- Succeeded by: Thomas Creighton

Personal details
- Born: January 16, 1941 Baltimore, Maryland, U.S.
- Died: October 7, 2025 (aged 84) Lancaster, Pennsylvania, U.S.
- Party: Republican
- Spouse: Peter True

Katie True (January 16, 1941 – October 7, 2025) was an American Republican politician, and a member of the Pennsylvania House of Representatives from 1993 to 2000, then again from 2003 to 2010.

== Early life and education ==
True was born in Baltimore, Maryland, but moved to Lancaster County, Pennsylvania, as a youth. She was a graduate of J. P. McCaskey High School.

== Career ==
True began her career in public service when she founded Kids Saving Kids, a nationally recognized drug-education program for elementary students. She was a Member of the National Federation of Parents for Drug Free Youth and served as Youth Director for Pennsylvanians AWARE, a statewide drug and alcohol prevention coalition.

=== Political career ===
True's work in the community, combined with service as a Republican Committee woman, eventually led to a political career. She was first elected to represent the 37th district in the Pennsylvania House of Representatives in 1992. She served in that position until 2000, when she left the House to run for Pennsylvania Auditor General. She lost that election to Bob Casey, Jr.

After her defeat in 2000, True served as the Executive Director of the Pennsylvania Commission for Women under Governor Tom Ridge.

In the 2002 election, True was elected to represent the 41st legislative district in the Pennsylvania House of Representatives. She retired prior to the 2010 election.

== Later career ==
On April 4, 2011, Governor Tom Corbett named True to lead the Bureau of Professional and Occupational Affairs within the Pennsylvania Department of State. As commissioner, True oversaw the state's professional and occupational hearing boards. The bureau provides administrative and legal support for all of the state's licensing boards - which oversees professionals from medical doctors to accountants and funeral directors – while protecting the health, safety and welfare of the public from fraudulent and unethical practitioners.

== Death ==
True died on October 7, 2025, at the age of 84.

Pennsylvania House of Representatives
Preceded by Ralph Kaiser	Member of the Pennsylvania House of Representatives for the 41st District; 2003–2010	Succeeded by Ryan Aument
Preceded by Emil Mrkonic	Member of the Pennsylvania House of Representatives for the 37th District; 1993–2000	Succeeded by Thomas Creighton
Party political offices
Preceded by Bob Nyce	Republican nominee for Auditor General of Pennsylvania; 2000	Succeeded by Joe Peters
