= Pennsylvania House of Representatives, District 99 =

American legislative district

Pennsylvania's 99th State House of Representatives district
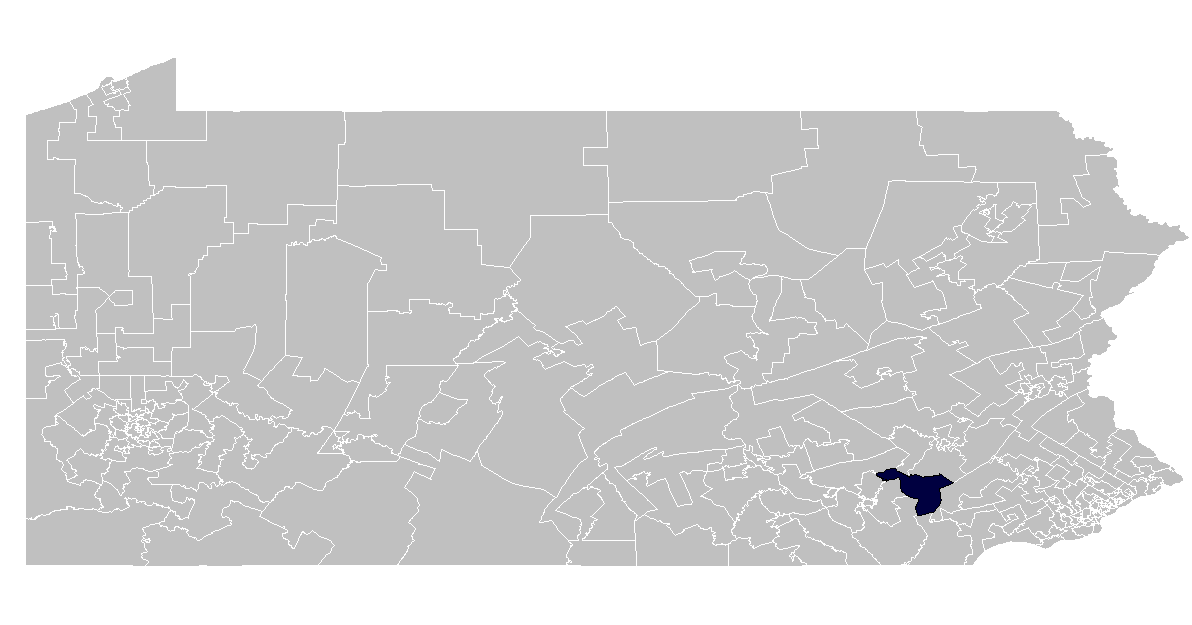
Representative
David H. Zimmerman; R–New Holland
- Demographics: 95.1% White; 1.1% Black; 3.4% Hispanic
- Population (2011) • Citizens of voting age: 62,684; 45,619

The 99th Pennsylvania House of Representatives District is located in Lancaster County. David H. Zimmerman has been the representative of this district since 2015. It includes the following areas:

- Akron
- Caernarvon Township
- Earl Township
- East Earl Township
- Ephrata
- Ephrata Township
- New Holland
- Salisbury Township
- Terre Hill

== Representatives ==
Representative	Party	Years	District home	Note
Prior to 1969, seats were apportioned by county.
Harry H. Gring	Republican	1969 – 1976		
Noah W. Wenger	Republican	1977 – 1982	Stevens	
Terry R. Scheetz	Republican	1983 – 1994		
Leroy M. Zimmerman	Republican	1995 – 2002		Died on December 2, 2002
Gordon Denlinger	Republican	2003 – 2014	Caernarvon Township	Elected on March 18, 2003 to fill vacancy
David H. Zimmerman	Republican	2015 – present	East Earl	Incumbent

== Recent election results ==
PA House election, 2010: Pennsylvania House, District 99
Party	Candidate	Votes	%	±%
Republican	Gordon R. Denlinger	14,202	100	
Turnout		14,202	100	

PA House election, 2012: Pennsylvania House, District 99
Party	Candidate	Votes	%	±%
Republican	Gordon R. Denlinger	19,198	100	
Turnout		19,198	100	

PA House election, 2014: Pennsylvania House, District 99
Party	Candidate	Votes	%	±%
Republican	David H. Zimmerman	9,974	71.3	
Democratic	Bryan Sanguinitino	4,014	28.7	
Margin of victory		5,960	42.6	
Turnout		15,934	100	

PA House election, 2016: Pennsylvania House, District 99
Party	Candidate	Votes	%	±%
Republican	David H. Zimmerman	17,945	74.26	
Democratic	Duane A. Groff	6,219	25.74	
Margin of victory		11,726	48.52	
Turnout		24,164	100	

PA House election, 2022: Pennsylvania House, District 99
Party	Candidate	Votes	%	±%
Republican	David H. Zimmerman	13,538	76.31	
Democratic	Joshua Caltagirone	4,177	23.54	
Margin of victory		9,361	52.77	
Turnout		17,740	100	

PA House election, 2024: Pennsylvania House, District 99
Party	Candidate	Votes	%	±%
Republican	David H. Zimmerman	19,179	97.87	
Turnout		19,601	100	
