= Christian Habeck Farm =

- U.S. National Register of Historic Places
- U.S. Historic district
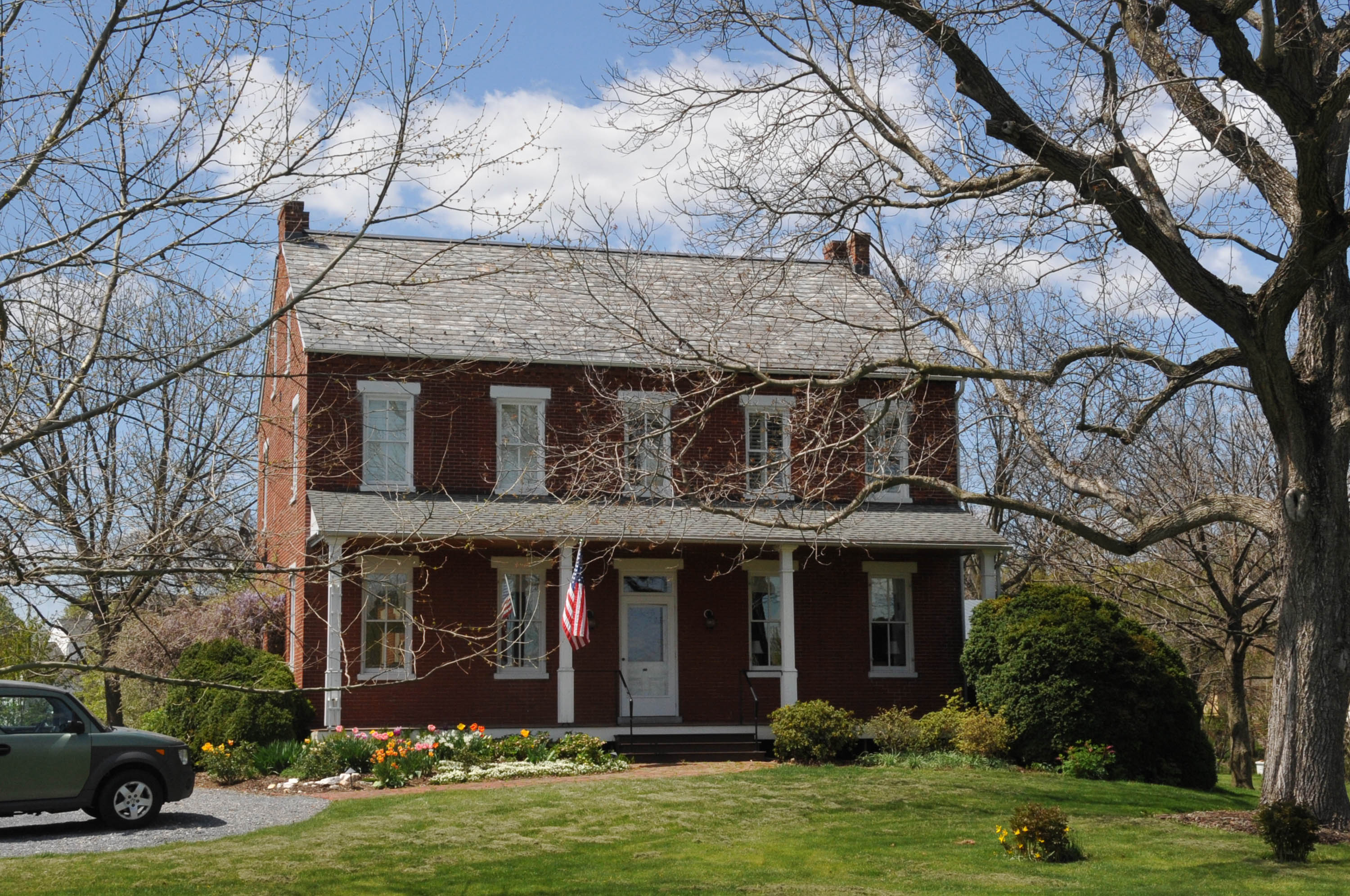
- Farmhouse

- Location within Pennsylvania Location within the United States
- Location: 2301 Spring Valley Rd., East Hempfield Township, Pennsylvania
- Coordinates: 40°03′41″N 76°21′52″W
- Area: 90.4 acres (36.6 ha)
- Built: 1869
- Architectural style: Pennsylvania-style farmhouse
- MPS: Historic Farming Resources of Lancaster County MPS
- NRHP reference No.: 94001063
- Added to NRHP: August 30, 1994

Christian Habeck Farm, also known as the Abraham Brubaker Farm, is a historic farm and national historic district located at East Hempfield Township, Lancaster County, Pennsylvania. The district includes 12 contributing buildings. They include the brick farmhouse, a frame Pennsylvania bank barn (1869), spring house (c. 1876), two frame tobacco barns (c. 1920), a brick tenant house (c. 1880), a summer kitchen (c. 1876), a pigsty (c. 1900), a milk house, and a creamery (c. 1910). The farmhouse dates to the mid-to-late-19th century. It is a 2 1/2-story, rectangular brick dwelling, with a full-width front porch.

It was listed on the National Register of Historic Places in 1994.
