= Louis G. Hill =

American politician

Member of the Pennsylvania Senate from the 36th district
- In office January 7, 1969 – January 8, 1978
- Preceded by: Stanley Stroup
- Succeeded by: Thomas McCormack

Personal details
- Born: March 10, 1924 Palm Beach, Florida
- Died: July 13, 2013 (aged 89) Lafayette Hill, Pennsylvania
- Education: Harvard University (1944); University of Pennsylvania Law School (1949)

Louis G. Hill (March 10, 1924 – July 13, 2013) was a former member of the Pennsylvania State Senate, serving from 1967 to 1978. He was born in 1924 in Palm Beach, Florida to Crawford and Ann Kaufman Hill.

In 1975 he ran in the Democratic primary for Mayor of Philadelphia against incumbent Frank Rizzo and lost.

He was elected Judge in the Philadelphia Municipal Court in 1978 and then to the Court of Common Pleas serving from 1980-1998.

He died on July 13, 2013, at a nursing home, after suffering from Alzheimer's disease.
