= Terry Scheetz =

American politician

Terry R. Scheetz

Member of the Pennsylvania House of Representatives from the 99th district
- In office January 4, 1983 – November 30, 1994
- Preceded by: Noah Wenger
- Succeeded by: Leroy Zimmerman

Personal details
- Born: December 10, 1941 (age 84) Lancaster, Pennsylvania
- Party: Republican

Terry R. Scheetz (born December 10, 1941) is a former Republican member of the Pennsylvania House of Representatives. He was born in Lancaster.
