= Robert F. Frazier =

American politician

Member of the Pennsylvania House of Representatives from the 41st district
- In office 1981–1982
- Preceded by: Joseph Zord
- Succeeded by: Raymond Book

Personal details
- Born: May 30, 1949 (age 77) Pittsburgh, Pennsylvania
- Died: September 1, 2025
- Party: Republican
- Education: Lehigh University (B.A.); Duquesne University (J.D.)
- Occupation: Attorney

Robert F. Frazier (born May 30, 1949) is an American lawyer who served a single two-year term (1981–82) as a Republican member of the Pennsylvania House of Representatives.

== Background ==
Born May 30, 1949, in Pittsburgh, Pennsylvania, Frazier graduated from Thomas Jefferson High School in Jefferson Hills, Pennsylvania, in 1967; earned a B.A. at Lehigh University in 1971, and a J.D. degree from Duquesne University in 1974, and went into practice as an attorney. He became involved in historical reenactment, becoming the commanding officer of a group called the "Royal American Regiment" which performs at Point State Park in Pittsburgh.

== Public office ==
Frazier was elected to the borough council of the borough of Pleasant Hills, Pennsylvania, for 1976–1979, serving as its president in 1978; and was elected to its planning commission for 1977–80, serving as chair in 1978. In 1980, Frazier (who had been active in the Pleasant Hills Republican Party) ran for the Pennsylvania House's 41st district (encompassing the boroughs of Pleasant Hills, Whithall, Brentwood, Bethel Park, and Baldwin), at that time held by fellow Republican Joseph Zord. He was not re-elected in 1982, being succeeded by another Republican, Raymond Book.

== SARAA ==
In 1996, Frazier chaired the Airport Divestiture Group (ADG) with the goal of negotiating the transfer of Harrisburg International Airport (HIA) and Capital City Airport (CXY) from the Pennsylvania Department of Transportation's Bureau of Aviation to an independent regional entity. The recipient was the Susquehanna Area Regional Airport Authority (SARAA), initially chaired by Frazier, which took over the two airports on January 1, 1998.
