= 2024 United States Senate election in Pennsylvania =

- November 5, 2024
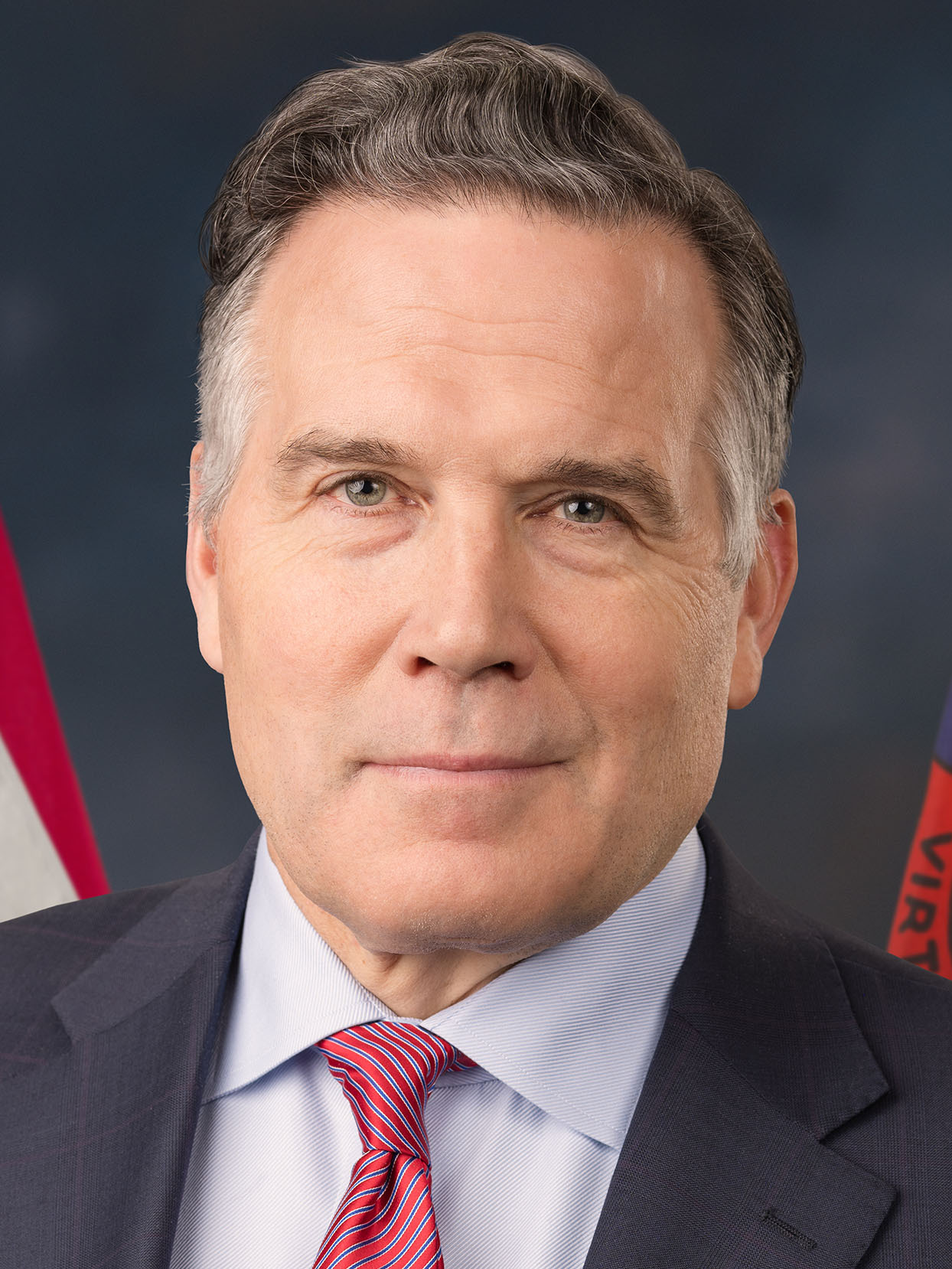

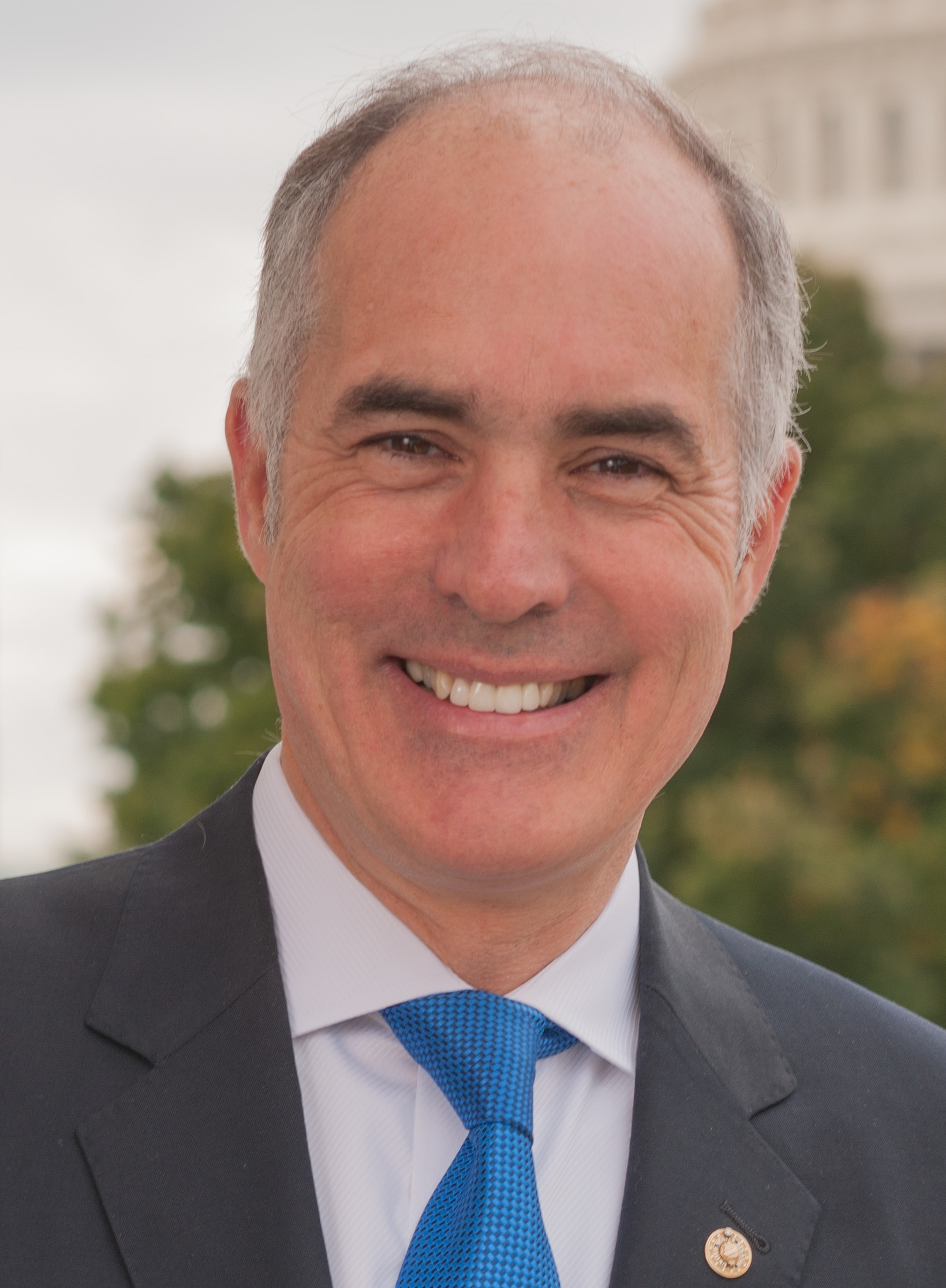
Nominee	Dave McCormick	Bob Casey Jr.
Party	Republican	Democratic
Popular vote	3,399,295	3,384,180
Percentage	48.78%	48.56%
- McCormick: 40–50% 50–60% 60–70% 70–80% 80–90% >90% Casey: 40–50% 50–60% 60–70% 70–80% 80–90% >90% Tie: 40–50%
U.S. senator before election
Bob Casey Jr.
Democratic
Elected U.S. Senator
Dave McCormick
Republican

The 2024 United States Senate election in Pennsylvania was held on November 5, 2024, to elect a member of the United States Senate to represent the state of Pennsylvania. Republican businessman Dave McCormick won his first term in office, defeating Democratic three-term incumbent Bob Casey Jr. in what was considered a major upset. Most predictions gave Casey a slight advantage, and he led in most polls. Along with Sherrod Brown in Ohio and Jon Tester in Montana, Casey was one of three incumbent senators to lose re-election in 2024, all of whom were Democrats first elected in 2006.

The primary election took place on April 23, 2024. The election was considered essential for Democrats' chances to retain their majority in 2024. The Associated Press and Fox News declared McCormick the winner on November 7, while Decision Desk HQ called the race for McCormick on November 14. CNN, NBC, ABC, and CBS all called the race for McCormick on November 21; Casey conceded the race later that day, halted a recount and confirmed the result.

This was Pennsylvania's closest US Senate election since the passage of the Seventeenth Amendment, as well as the closest Senate election of the 2024 cycle. McCormick was the only Republican challenger to win in a state flipped by Trump in the 2024 presidential election. The other three Republican Senate gains were in states Trump had won in all three of his runs. With Democrats flipping the other Senate seat two years earlier, this was the first time since the 2012 Senate election in Indiana where the opposite party flipped a seat after losing one in the previous cycle.

This was Casey's first general election loss of his political career, and the second counting Casey's primary election loss in 2002. McCormick was sworn in on January 3, 2025.

== Background ==
Pennsylvania is considered to be a purple state at the federal level, especially since in the 2020 presidential election, Joe Biden carried Pennsylvania by about 1.2 percentage points. Democrats had controlled both U.S. Senate seats, the governorship, a majority of its U.S. House delegation, and the Pennsylvania House of Representatives. The last time Republicans won a U.S. Senate seat in Pennsylvania was in 2016.

Senator Bob Casey Jr. was first elected in the blue wave of 2006, defeating then-incumbent Senator Rick Santorum by about 17 percentage points. He was re-elected in 2012 by 9 percentage points (when he ran ahead of Obama by almost 4 points) and in the blue wave of 2018 by 13 percentage points. Given these three decisive victories, Casey's fourth term appeared inevitable for much of the race. However, tightening polls in the final weeks indicated a closer contest, even as Casey was largely considered the favorite to win.

== Democratic primary ==
=== Candidates ===
==== Nominee ====
- Bob Casey Jr., incumbent U.S. senator (2007–2025)

==== Disqualified ====
- William Parker, app developer

=== Endorsements ===
Bob Casey Jr.

Executive officials

- Patrick Murphy, Acting Secretary of the Army (2016), former U.S. representative for PA-8 (2007–2011)

U.S. senators

- John Fetterman, U.S. senator from Pennsylvania (2023–present)
- Mark Kelly, U.S. senator from Arizona (2020–present)

U.S. representatives

- Chris Carney, PA-10 (2007–2011)
- Chris Deluzio, PA-17 (2023–present)
- Chrissy Houlahan, PA-6 (2019–present)
- Conor Lamb, PA-17 (2018–2023)

Statewide officials

- Josh Shapiro, Governor of Pennsylvania (2023–present)
- Gretchen Whitmer, Governor of Michigan (2019-present)

Individuals

- Harry Dunn, former U.S. Capitol Police officer
- Cristina Tzintzún Ramirez, labor organizer and president of NextGen America PAC (2021–present)

Political parties

- Pennsylvania Democratic Party

Organizations

- American Israel Public Affairs Committee (AIPAC)
- CASA in Action
- Council for a Livable World
- Democratic Majority for Israel
- End Citizens United
- Feminist Majority PAC
- Giffords
- Harvard College Democrats
- Human Rights Campaign
- Humane Society Legislative Fund
- Jewish Democratic Council of America
- Joint Action Committee for Political Affairs
- League of Conservation Voters
- National Committee to Preserve Social Security and Medicare
- Natural Resources Defense Council
- NextGen America PAC
- Peace Action
- Pennsylvania State Education Association
- People for the American Way
- Swing Left

Labor unions

- Actors' Equity Association
- AFSCME Council 13
- Association of Flight Attendants
- National Education Association
- Pennsylvania AFL–CIO
- United Mine Workers of America
- United Steelworkers

Newspapers

- Philadelphia Gay News

=== Fundraising ===
Campaign finance reports as of April 15, 2024
Candidate	Raised	Spent	Cash on hand
Bob Casey Jr. (D)	$23,790,263	$12,391,802	$11,886,480
Source: Federal Election Commission

=== Results ===
Democratic primary results
Party	Candidate	Votes	%
Democratic	Bob Casey Jr. (incumbent)	1,024,545	100.00%
Total votes		1,024,545	100.00%

== Republican primary ==
=== Candidates ===
==== Nominee ====
- Dave McCormick, former U.S. Under Secretary of the Treasury for International Affairs (2007–2009), former CEO of Bridgewater Associates (2020–2022), and candidate for U.S. Senate in 2022

==== Withdrawn ====
- Brandi Tomasetti, former Conestoga Township treasurer and secretary (ran as a write-in candidate)

==== Disqualified ====
- Joseph Vodvarka, spring manufacturer and perennial candidate

==== Declined ====
- Kathy Barnette, political commentator, nominee for Pennsylvania's 4th congressional district in 2020, and candidate for U.S. Senate in 2022
- Stacy Garrity, Pennsylvania State Treasurer (2021–present) (running for re-election)
- Doug Mastriano, state senator for SD-33 (2019–present) and nominee for Governor of Pennsylvania in 2022 (endorsed McCormick)

=== Endorsements ===
Dave McCormick

Executive Branch officials

- George W. Bush, 43rd President of the United States (2001–2009)
- Karl Rove, former White House Deputy Chief of Staff for Policy (2005–2007)
- Donald Trump, 45th President of the United States (2017–2021) and Republican presidential candidate

Federal officials

- John Bolton, former National Security Advisor (2018–2019) and former Ambassador to the United Nations (2005–2006)
- Dina Powell, former Deputy National Security Advisor for Strategy (2017–2018) (his wife)

State cabinet officials

- Robert Gleason, former Pennsylvania Secretary of the Commonwealth (1985–1987)

U.S senators

- Pat Toomey, U.S. senator from Pennsylvania (2011–2023)
- Rick Santorum, U.S. senator from Pennsylvania (1995–2007)
- Marsha Blackburn, U.S. senator from Tennessee (2019–present)
- Steve Daines, U.S. senator from Montana (2015–present)
- Mitch McConnell, U.S. senator from Kentucky (1985–present) and Senate Minority Leader (2007–2015, 2021–2025)

U.S. representatives

- Brian Fitzpatrick, PA-1 (2017–present)
- Jim Jordan, OH-4 (2007–present)
- John Joyce, PA-13 (2019–present)
- Mike Kelly, PA-16 (2011–present)
- Dan Meuser, PA-9 (2019–present)
- Scott Perry, PA-10 (2013–present)
- Guy Reschenthaler, PA-14 (2019–present)
- Lloyd Smucker, PA-11 (2017–present)
- Glenn Thompson, PA-15 (2009–present)

State senators

- Ryan Aument, state senator for SD-36 (2015–2024)
- Doug Mastriano, state senator for SD-33 (2019–present) and 2022 GOP nominee for Governor

Local officials

- Sam DeMarco, at-large Allegheny County councilor (2016–present) and chair of the Allegheny County Republican Party (2018–present)

Party officials

- Andrew Reilly, Republican National Committeeman from Pennsylvania (2020–present)
- Christine Toretti, Republican National Committeewoman from Pennsylvania (1997–2025)

Organizations

- Americans for Prosperity
- Conservative Political Action Conference
- Log Cabin Republicans
- Pennsylvania Federation and Penn State College Republicans
- Republican Jewish Coalition

Political parties

- Pennsylvania Republican Party

Individuals

- Kenneth C. Griffin, businessman
- Paul Tudor Jones, philanthropist
- Matt Schlapp, chair of the American Conservative Union (2014–present)
- Charles R. Schwab, investor

=== Fundraising ===
Campaign finance reports as of April 15, 2024
Candidate	Raised	Spent	Cash on hand
Dave McCormick (R)	$11,052,879	$4,660,701	$6,399,998
Source: Federal Election Commission

=== Polling ===
Hypothetical polling

Poll source	Date(s) administered	Sample size (Note: Key: A – all adults RV – registered voters LV – likely voters V – unclear)	Margin of error	Kathy Barnette	Doug Mastriano	David McCormick	Undecided
Public Policy Polling (D)	March 9–10, 2023	616 (LV)	–	11%	39%	21%	29%
Public Policy Polling (D)	March 9–10, 2023	616 (LV)	–	–	42%	28%	29%

=== Results ===
Republican primary results
Party	Candidate	Votes	%
Republican	Dave McCormick	878,320	100.00%
Total votes		878,320	100.00%

== Third parties ==
=== Libertarian convention ===
==== Nominee ====
- John Thomas, educator

==== Eliminated at convention ====
- Erik Gerhardt, carpenter, nominee for U.S. Senate in 2022, and candidate for president in 2020

=== Green Party ===
==== Nominee ====
- Leila Hazou, shop owner

=== Constitution Party ===
==== Nominee ====
- Bernard Selker, truck driver

=== American Solidarity Party ===
==== Disqualified ====
- Erik Messina

== General election ==
=== Predictions ===
Source	Ranking	As of
The Cook Political Report	Tossup	October 21, 2024
Inside Elections	Tilt D	November 9, 2023
Sabato's Crystal Ball	Lean D	June 13, 2024
Decision Desk HQ/The Hill	Tossup	June 8, 2024
Elections Daily	Lean D	October 24, 2024
CNalysis	Lean D	November 21, 2023
RealClearPolitics	Tossup	August 5, 2024
Split Ticket	Lean D	October 23, 2024
538	Lean D	October 28, 2024

=== Post-primary endorsements ===
Bob Casey Jr. (D)

Executive branch officials

- Joe Biden, 46th President of the United States (2021–2025), 47th Vice President of the United States (2009–2017)
- Kamala Harris, 49th Vice President of the United States (2021–2025)
- Barack Obama, 44th President of the United States (2009–2017)
Dave McCormick (R)

Former U.S. executive officials

- Nikki Haley, United States Ambassador to the United Nations (2017–2018) and Governor of South Carolina (2011–2017)

U.S. Senators

- John Thune, Senate Minority Whip (2021–2025) from South Dakota (2005–present)

Individuals

- Elon Musk, CEO of Tesla and SpaceX
- Ben Shapiro, editor emeritus of The Daily Wire
John Thomas (L)

Individuals

- Ben Zeisloft, Christian conservative commentator for The Daily Wire
- Bill Cox, Pennsylvania state director for Robert F. Kennedy Jr.'s presidential campaign

=== Fundraising ===
Campaign finance reports as of October 16, 2024
Candidate	Raised	Spent	Cash on hand
Bob Casey (D)	$52,879,737	$50,545,793	$2,821,961
Dave McCormick (R)	$27,698,652 (Note: $4,263,800 of this total was self-funded by McCormick)	$26,030,736	$1,675,736
Source: Federal Election Commission

=== Debates ===
2024 Pennsylvania U.S. Senate election debates
No.	Date	Host	Moderator	Link	Democratic	Republican
Key: P Participant A Absent N Not invited I Invited W Withdrawn						
Key: P Participant A Absent N Not invited I Invited W Withdrawn					Casey	McCormick
1	October 3, 2024	WHTM-TV	Dennis Owens	YouTube	P	P
2	October 15, 2024	WPVI-TV	Matt O'Donnell, Sharrie Williams, Ilia Garcia	C-SPAN	P	P

=== Polling ===
Aggregate polls

Source of poll aggregation	Dates administered	Dates updated	Bob Casey Jr. (D)	Dave McCormick (R)	Undecided (Note: Calculated by taking the difference of 100% and all other candidates combined.)	Margin
538	through November 4, 2024	November 4, 2024	48.2%	45.4%	6.4%	Casey +2.8%
RealClearPolitics	October 21 – November 4, 2024	November 4, 2024	48.1%	46.3%	5.6%	Casey +1.8%
270toWin	October 24 – November 4, 2024	November 4, 2024	48.4%	45.9%	5.7%	Casey +2.5%
TheHill/DDHQ	through November 4, 2024	November 4, 2024	48.6%	46.6%	4.8%	Casey +2.0%
Average			48.3%	46.1%	5.6%	Casey +2.2%

Poll source	Date(s) administered	Sample size	Margin of error	Bob Casey Jr. (D)	Dave McCormick (R)	Other	Undecided
AtlasIntel	November 3–4, 2024	1,840 (LV)	± 2.0%	49%	47%	2%	2%
Survation	November 1–4, 2024	929 (LV)	–	49%	42%	3% (Note: Thomas (L) and Hazou (G) with 1%; "Refused" with 1%)	6%
Research Co.	November 2–3, 2024	450 (LV)	± 4.6%	48%	46%	2% (Note: "Some other candidate" with 2%)	4%
Patriot Polling (R)	November 1–3, 2024	903 (RV)	± 3.0%	50%	49%	–	–
The Trafalgar Group (R)	November 1–3, 2024	1,089 (LV)	± 2.9%	46%	47%	–	7%
InsiderAdvantage (R)	November 1–2, 2024	800 (LV)	± 3.5%	48%	47%	2%	3%
AtlasIntel	November 1–2, 2024	2,049 (LV)	± 2.0%	49%	47%	3% (Note: "Other" with 2%; "Blank/Null/Won't vote" with 1%)	2%
Emerson College (Note: Poll sponsored by The Hill)	October 30 – November 2, 2024	1,000 (LV)	± 3.0%	47%	47%	–	6%
New York Times/Siena College (Note: Poll sponsored by The Philadelphia Inquirer)	October 29 – November 2, 2024	1,527 (LV)	± 2.9%	50%	45%	–	4%
New York Times/Siena College	October 29 – November 2, 2024	1,527 (RV)	± 2.8%	50%	45%	–	6%
Mainstreet Research/FAU	October 25 – November 2, 2024	699 (LV)	± 3.6%	49%	44%	1% (Note: "Another candidate" with 1%)	6%
Mainstreet Research/FAU	October 25 – November 2, 2024	726 (RV)	± 3.6%	48%	43%	2% (Note: "Another candidate" with 2%)	7%
Morning Consult	October 23 – November 1, 2024	1,538 (LV)	± 3.0%	46%	43%	–	11%
AtlasIntel	October 30–31, 2024	1,738 (LV)	± 2.0%	49%	46%	3%	2%
OnMessage (R)	October 29–31, 2024	800 (LV)	–	46%	46%	–	8%
Data for Progress (D)	October 25–31, 2024	908 (LV)	± 3.0%	49%	45%	2% (Note: Thomas (L) and Hazou (G) with 1%)	4%
YouGov (Note: Poll conducted for The Times, Stanford University, Arizona State University, and Yale University)	October 25–31, 2024	947 (LV)	± 3.5%	50%	44%	–	6%
YouGov	October 25–31, 2024	982 (RV)	± 3.5%	50%	43%	–	6%
ActiVote	October 14–31, 2024	400 (LV)	± 4.9%	50.5%	49.5%	–	–
Muhlenberg College (Note: Poll sponsored by The Morning Call)	October 27–30, 2024	460 (LV)	± 6.0%	49%	46%	3%	1%
Suffolk University (Note: Poll sponsored by USA Today)	October 27–30, 2024	500 (LV)	± 4.4%	49%	46%	2%	2%
Marist College	October 27–30, 2024	1,400 (LV)	± 3.4%	50%	48%	1% (Note: "Another party's candidate" with 1%)	1%
Marist College	October 27–30, 2024	1,558 (RV)	± 3.2%	50%	48%	1%	1%
Echelon Insights	October 27–30, 2024	600 (LV)	± 4.5%	44%	47%	3% (Note: Hazou (G) with 2%; Thomas (L) with 1%)	5%
The Washington Post	October 26–30, 2024	1,204 (LV)	± 3.1%	49%	46%	2% (Note: "Someone else" with 1%; "Would not vote" with 1%)	3%
The Washington Post	October 26–30, 2024	1,204 (RV)	± 3.1%	49%	45%	3% (Note: "Someone else" with 1%; "Would not vote" with 2%)	3%
AtlasIntel	October 25–29, 2024	1,229 (LV)	± 3.0%	49%	47%	3%	2%
Fox News	October 24–28, 2024	1,057 (LV)	± 3.0%	50%	48%	–	1%
Fox News	October 24–28, 2024	1,310 (RV)	± 2.5%	51%	46%	1%	2%
Quinnipiac University	October 24–28, 2024	2,186 (LV)	± 2.1%	50%	47%	2% (Note: "Refused" with 2%)	1%
Monmouth University	October 24–28, 2024	824 (RV)	± 3.8%	45%	44%	–	12%
CNN/SSRS	October 23–28, 2024	819 (LV)	± 4.7%	48%	45%	6% (Note: "Other" with 4%; "Neither" with 2%)	1%
CBS News/YouGov	October 22–28, 2024	1,249 (LV)	± 3.6%	48%	42%	3% (Note: "Someone else" with 3%)	7%
InsiderAdvantage (R)	October 26–27, 2024	800 (LV)	± 3.5%	47%	47%	2% (Note: "Other" with 2%)	4%
North Star Opinion Research (R) (Note: Poll sponsored by American Greatness)	October 22–26, 2024	600 (LV)	± 4.0%	45%	42%	5% (Note: Thomas (L) with 2%; Hazou (G) and Selker (C) with 1%; "Other" with 1%)	9%
UMass Lowell/YouGov	October 16–23, 2024	800 (LV)	± 3.7%	48%	42%	3% (Note: Thomas with 2%; "Another candidate" with 1%)	7%
Emerson College (Note: Poll sponsored by RealClearPennsylvania)	October 21–22, 2024	860 (LV)	± 3.3%	47%	46%	2% (Note: "Someone else" with 2%)	6%
Susquehanna Polling & Research (R)	October 18–22, 2024	500 (LV)	± 4.4%	49%	46%	2% (Note: "Refuse" with 2%)	4%
Franklin & Marshall College	October 9–20, 2024	583 (LV)	± 5.0%	49%	48%	–	3%
Franklin & Marshall College	October 9–20, 2024	794 (RV)	± 4.3%	48%	41%	5% (Note: "Other" (Thomas (L), Hazou (G) & Selker (C)) with 5%)	6%
The Trafalgar Group (R)	October 17–19, 2024	1,084 (LV)	± 2.9%	47%	47%	–	6%
AtlasIntel	October 12–17, 2024	2,048 (LV)	± 2.0%	47%	48%	2% (Note: "Blank/Null/Won't vote" with 1%; "Other" with 1%)	3%
The Bullfinch Group	October 11–17, 2024	600 (LV)	± 4.0%	50%	43%	–	8%
YouGov (Note: Poll sponsored by Rose Institute of State and Local Government)	October 7–17, 2024	1,043 (LV)	± 3.44%	50%	42%	–	8%
YouGov	October 7–17, 2024	1,062 (RV)	± 3.4%	49%	42%	–	9%
Morning Consult	October 6–15, 2024	1,395 (LV)	± 3.0%	49%	41%	–	10%
New York Times/Siena College	October 7–10, 2024	857 (LV)	± 3.8%	48%	44%	–	8%
New York Times/Siena College	October 7–10, 2024	857 (RV)	± 3.7%	48%	43%	–	9%
American Pulse Research & Polling	October 2–10, 2024	1,193 (LV)	± 2.8%	48%	45%	2% (Note: "Another candidate" with 2%)	5%
TIPP Insights (R)	October 7–9, 2024	803 (LV)	± 3.5%	47%	43%	1% (Note: "Other" with 1%)	9%
TIPP Insights (R)	October 7–9, 2024	1,079 (RV)	± 3.5%	48%	40%	1% (Note: "Other" with 1%)	12%
UMass Lowell/YouGov	October 2–9, 2024	800 (LV)	± 4.0%	48%	39%	3% (Note: Hazou (G) and Thomas (L) with 1%; "Another candidate" with 1%)	10%
InsiderAdvantage (R)	October 7–8, 2024	800 (LV)	± 3.5%	47%	45%	2%	6%
Emerson College	October 5–8, 2024	1,000 (LV)	± 3.0%	48%	46%	–	6%
Research Co.	October 5–7, 2024	450 (LV)	± 4.6%	47%	44%	1% (Note: "Some other candidate" with 1%)	8%
Quinnipiac University	October 3–7, 2024	1,412 (LV)	± 2.6%	51%	43%	2% (Note: "Someone else" with 1%; "Refused" with 1%)	5%
ActiVote	September 6 – October 7, 2024	400 (LV)	± 4.9%	53%	47%	–	–
OnMessage (R) (Note: Poll sponsored by Sentinel Action Fund)	September 28–29, 2024	800 (LV)	± 3.5%	45%	44%	5% (Note: "Other" with 5%)	7%
Patriot Polling (R)	September 27–29, 2024	816 (RV)	± 3.0%	51%	48%	–	–
The Bullfinch Group (Note: Poll sponsored by the Commonwealth Foundation)	September 26–29, 2024	800 (LV)	± 3.46%	48%	39%	12% (Note: "None of the Above" with 9%; "Other" with 3%)	–
The Bullfinch Group	September 26–29, 2024	800 (LV)	± 3.46%	52%	42%	6% (Note: Thomas (L) with 3%, Hazou (G) with 2%, and Selker (C) with 1%)	–
The Trafalgar Group (R)	September 26–29, 2024	1,090 (LV)	± 2.9%	47%	46%	–	7%
Emerson College	September 27–28, 2024	1,000 (LV)	± 3.0%	47%	45%	–	8%
AtlasIntel	September 20–25, 2024	1,775 (LV)	± 2.0%	47%	45%	1% (Note: "Blank/Null/Won't vote" with 1%; "Other" with <1%)	6%
BSG (R)/GS Strategy Group (D) (Note: Poll sponsored by The Cook Political Report)	September 19–25, 2024	474 (LV)	–	48%	42%	3% (Note: "Someone else" with 1%; "Would not vote" with 2%)	6%
BSG (R)/GS Strategy Group (D)	September 19–25, 2024	474 (LV)	–	52%	45%	–	3%
Fox News	September 20–24, 2024	775 (LV)	± 3.5%	53%	44%	1% (Note: "Wouldn't vote" with 1%)	2%
Fox News	September 20–24, 2024	1,021 (RV)	± 3.0%	53%	44%	1%	2%
Fabrizio Ward (R)/Impact Research (D) (Note: Poll commissioned by AARP)	September 17–24, 2024	816 (RV)	± 3.0%	49%	45%	–	6%
Susquehanna Polling & Research (R)	September 16–22, 2024	700 (LV)	± 3.7%	48%	40%	1% (Note: "Other" with 1%)	11%
RMG Research (Note: Poll sponsored by the Napolitan Institute)	September 18–20, 2024	783 (LV)	± 3.5%	50%	44%	1%	5%
Remington Research Group (R) (Note: Poll sponsored by American Fuel & Petrochemical Manufacturers, a group that supports Republicans.)	September 16–20, 2024	800 (LV)	± 3.5%	49%	45%	–	7%
Muhlenberg College	September 16–19, 2024	450 (LV)	± 6.0%	48%	43%	5%	4%
Redfield & Wilton Strategies (Note: Poll sponsored by The Daily Telegraph)	September 16–19, 2024	1,086 (LV)	± 2.8%	47%	41%	2% (Note: Thomas (L), "Wouldn't vote if these are the candidates" with 1%)	10%
UMass Lowell/YouGov	September 11–19, 2024	800 (LV)	± 4.0%	47%	38%	3%	13%
Emerson College	September 15–18, 2024	880 (LV)	± 3.2%	47%	42%	–	11%
MassINC Polling Group (Note: Poll sponsored by Spotlight PA)	September 12–18, 2024	800 (LV)	± 4.0%	49%	42%	2% (Note: "Another candidate" and "Would not vote for senate" each with 1%; "Prefer not to say" with <1%)	6%
Morning Consult	September 9–18, 2024	1,756 (LV)	± 3.0%	49%	40%	–	11%
Marist College	September 12–17, 2024	1,663 (RV)	± 2.0%	52%	46%	1%	1%
Marist College	September 12–17, 2024	1,476 (LV)	± 3.2%	52%	47%	–	1%
Quinnipiac University	September 12–16, 2024	1,331 (LV)	± 2.7%	52%	43%	1% (Note: "Refused" with 1%)	3%
The Washington Post	September 12–16, 2024	1,003 (LV)	± 3.6%	47%	46%	7% (Note: "No opinion/Skipped" with 4%; Thomas (L), Hazou (G), and "Would not vote" each with 1%)	–
The Washington Post	September 12–16, 2024	1,003 (LV)	± 3.6%	48%	48%	5% (Note: "No opinion/Skipped" with 3%; "Would not vote" each with 2%)	–
New York Times/Siena College	September 11–16, 2024	1,082 (RV)	± 4.1%	48%	39%	–	13%
New York Times/Siena College	September 11–16, 2024	1,082 (LV)	± 4.3%	49%	40%	–	11%
InsiderAdvantage (R)	September 14–15, 2024	800 (LV)	± 3.5%	49%	44%	2%	5%
Franklin & Marshall College	September 4–15, 2024	890 (RV)	± 4.1%	48%	40%	3% (Note: "Other" with 3%)	10%
Suffolk University	September 11–14, 2024	500 (LV)	± 4.4%	47%	43%	2% (Note: Thomas (L) with 1%; Selker (C) with 1%; Hazou (G) with <1%)	8%
Redfield & Wilton Strategies	September 6–9, 2024	801 (LV)	± 3.0%	44%	36%	5% (Note: "Won't vote if these are the candidates" with 4%; Thomas (L) with 1%)	14%
Morning Consult	August 30 – September 8, 2024	1,910 (LV)	± 2.0%	49%	40%	–	11%
co/efficient (R)	September 4–6, 2024	889 (LV)	± 3.29%	45%	36%	–	19%
CBS News/YouGov	September 3–6, 2024	1,076 (LV)	± 3.4%	48%	41%	3% (Note: "Someone else" with 3%)	8%
YouGov	August 23 – September 3, 2024	1,000 (RV)	± 3.6%	52%	41%	–	8%
The Trafalgar Group (R)	August 28–30, 2024	1,082 (LV)	± 2.9%	46%	45%	–	8%
CNN/SRSS	August 23–29, 2024	789 (LV)	± 4.7%	46%	46%	7% (Note: "Other" with 4%; "Neither" with 3%)	1%
Redfield & Wilton Strategies	August 25–28, 2024	1,071 (LV)	± 2.8%	44%	38%	4% (Note: Thomas (L) with 1%; Hazou (G) with 1%; "Other" with 1%; "Won't vote if these are the candidates" with 1%)	14%
Emerson College	August 25–28, 2024	950 (LV)	± 3.1%	48%	44%	–	8%
ActiVote	August 3–23, 2024	400 (LV)	± 4.9%	55%	45%	–	–
Fabrizio Ward (R) (Note: Poll sponsored by the Pinpoint Policy Institute)	August 19–21, 2024	400 (LV)	± 4.9%	46%	43%	–	11%
Cygnal (R)	August 14–15, 2024	800 (LV)	± 3.4%	46%	42%	–	12%
Cygnal (R)	August 14–15, 2024	800 (LV)	± 3.4%	42%	38%	7% (Note: Thomas (L) with 3%; Hazou (G) with 2%; Messina (AS) and Selker (C) with 1%)	13%
Redfield & Wilton Strategies	August 12–15, 2024	825 (LV)	± 3.2%	44%	36%	1% (Note: Leila Hazou (G) with 1%, John Thomas (L), "Other (Another Third Party/Write-In)", and Marty Selker (C) with 0%)	17%
Emerson College	August 13–14, 2024	1,000 (LV)	± 3.0%	48%	44%	–	8%
Quinnipiac University	August 8–12, 2024	1,738 (LV)	± 2.4%	52%	44%	1% (Note: "Refused" with 1%)	3%
The Bullfinch Group (Note: Poll sponsored by the Independent Center)	August 8–11, 2024	500 (RV)	± 4.38%	51%	39%	–	10%
Franklin & Marshall College	July 31 – August 11, 2024	920 (RV)	± 3.8%	48%	36%	3% (Note: "Some other candidate" with 3%)	13%
New York Times/Siena College	August 6–9, 2024	693 (RV)	± 4.0%	50%	36%	–	14%
New York Times/Siena College	August 6–9, 2024	693 (LV)	± 4.2%	51%	37%	–	11%
Redfield & Wilton Strategies	July 31 – August 3, 2024	743 (LV)	± 3.4%	45%	40%	2% (Note: John Thomas (L) and "Other (Another Third Party/Write-In)" with 1%; Leila Hazou (G) and Marty Selker (C) with 0%)	12%
BSG (R)/GS Strategy Group (D)	July 26 – August 2, 2024	411 (LV)	–	53%	40%	–	7%
Susquehanna Polling & Research (R)	July 22–28, 2024	600 (LV)	± 4.0%	47%	42%	–	11%
Fox News	July 22–24, 2024	1,034 (RV)	± 3.0%	55%	42%	–	1%
Redfield & Wilton Strategies	July 22–24, 2024	851 (LV)	± 3.1%	46%	39%	4% (Note: John Thomas (L) with 2%; Leila Hazou (G) with 1%; Marty Selker (C) with 0%; "Other (Another Third Party/Write-In)" with 1%)	11%
Emerson College (Note: Poll sponsored by The Hill and Nexstar)	July 22–23, 2024	850 (RV)	± 3.3%	48%	44%	–	8%
SoCal Strategies (R) (Note: Poll sponsored by On Point Politics)	July 20–21, 2024	500 (LV)	± 4.4%	50%	40%	–	10%
Public Policy Polling (D) (Note: Poll sponsored by Clean and Prosperous America PAC, a group that supports Democrats.)	July 17–18, 2024	624 (RV)	± 3.8%	50%	39%	–	11%
Redfield & Wilton Strategies	July 16–18, 2024	688 (LV)	–	44%	37%	3% (Note: Leila Hazou (G), John Thomas (L), and Marty Selker (C) with 1%)	15%
Public Policy Polling (D) (Note: Poll sponsored by the Progress Action Fund, which is a sponsor of the Democratic Party.)	July 11–12, 2024	537 (RV)	–	47%	44%	–	9%
YouGov	July 4–12, 2024	1,000 (RV)	± 3.4%	50%	38%	1%	11%
YouGov	July 4–12, 2024	889 (LV)	–	51%	39%	1%	9%
New York Times/Siena College	July 9–11, 2024	872 (RV)	± 3.7%	50%	39%	–	10%
New York Times/Siena College	July 9–11, 2024	872 (LV)	± 3.8%	50%	42%	–	8%
Expedition Strategies (Note: Poll Sponsored by Progressive Policy Institute)	June 24 – July 8, 2024	284 (LV)	–	48%	45%	–	7%
Remington Research Group (R)	June 29 – July 1, 2024	673 (LV)	± 4.0%	49%	48%	–	4%
Cygnal (R)	June 27–28, 2024	800 (LV)	± 3.5%	46%	42%	–	12%
The Bullfinch Group (Note: Poll sponsored by the Commonwealth Foundation, a conservative think tank)	June 14–19, 2024	800 (RV)	± 3.5%	48%	36%	–	16%
Emerson College	June 13–18, 2024	1,000 (RV)	± 3.0%	47%	41%	–	12%
Marist College	June 3–6, 2024	1,181 (RV)	± 3.6%	52%	46%	–	2%
Mainstreet Research/FAU	May 30–31, 2024	1,012 (RV)	± 3.1%	48%	40%	5%	7%
Mainstreet Research/FAU	May 30–31, 2024	923 (LV)	± 3.1%	49%	42%	3%	6%
KAConsulting (R) (Note: Poll conducted for Vapor Technology Association)	May 15–19, 2024	600 (RV)	–	47%	37%	4% (Note: "Would not vote" with 3%; "Someone else" with 1%)	12%
BSG (R)/GS Strategy Group (D)	May 6–13, 2024	730 (LV)	± 3.6%	49%	41%	–	10%
New York Times/Siena College	April 28 – May 9, 2024	1,023 (RV)	± 3.6%	46%	41%	–	13%
New York Times/Siena College	April 28 – May 9, 2024	1,023 (LV)	± 3.6%	46%	44%	–	10%
Fabrizio Ward (R)/Impact Research (D)	April 24–30, 2024	1,398 (LV)	± 3.0%	48%	44%	–	8%
Emerson College	April 25–29, 2024	1,000 (RV)	± 3.0%	46%	42%	–	12%
CBS News/YouGov	April 19–25, 2024	1,306 (LV)	± 3.1%	46%	39%	–	15%
Muhlenberg College	April 15–25, 2024	417 (RV)	± 6.0%	45%	41%	5%	9%
The Bullfinch Group	March 29 – April 3, 2024	600 (RV)	± 4.0%	45%	38%	9%	8%
National Public Affairs	March 2024	759 (LV)	± 3.6%	32%	28%	–	40%
Franklin & Marshall College	March 20–31, 2024	431 (RV)	± 5.7%	46%	39%	–	15%
The Bullfinch Group	March 22–26, 2024	800 (RV)	± 3.5%	47%	30%	8%	15%
Emerson College	March 10–13, 2024	1,000 (RV)	± 3.0%	52%	48%	–	–
Susquehanna Polling & Research (R)	February 27 – March 7, 2024	450 (LV)	± 4.6%	48%	42%	–	10%
Emerson College	February 14–16, 2024	1,000 (RV)	± 3.0%	49%	39%	–	13%
Chism Strategies	February 6–8, 2024	500 (RV)	± 5.0%	38%	37%	–	25%
Public Opinion Strategies (R) (Note: Poll sponsored by McCormick's campaign)	January 22–25, 2024	800 (LV)	± 3.5%	47%	40%	–	12%
Franklin & Marshall College	January 17–28, 2024	1,006 (RV)	± 3.6%	47%	35%	4%	14%
Susquehanna Polling & Research (R)	January 15–21, 2024	745 (LV)	± 3.7%	46%	42%	3%	9%
Quinnipiac University	January 4–8, 2024	1,680 (RV)	± 2.4%	53%	43%	1%	2%
The Bullfinch Group	December 8–12, 2023	800 (RV)	± 3.5%	42%	27%	13% (Note: "None of the above" with 8%; "Other" with 5%)	20%
Change Research (D) (Note: Poll sponsored by Future Majority, a partisan sponsor for the Democratic Party.)	December 3–7, 2023	2,532 (RV)	± 3.5%	44%	41%	0%	15%
Franklin & Marshall College	October 11–22, 2023	873 (RV)	± 4.1%	46%	39%	4%	12%
Emerson College	October 1–4, 2023	430 (RV)	± 4.7%	41%	33%	8%	18%
Quinnipiac University	September 28 – October 2, 2023	1,725 (RV)	± 2.4%	50%	44%	2% (Note: "Someone else" & "Wouldn't vote" with 1%)	4%
Susquehanna Polling & Research (R)	May 2–8, 2023	700 (LV)	± 3.7%	53%	41%	1%	5%
Cygnal (R)	April 12–13, 2023	600 (LV)	± 4.0%	46%	41%	0%	13%
Franklin & Marshall College	March 27 – April 7, 2023	643 (RV)	± 6.6%	42%	35%	–	23%

Hypothetical polling

Bob Casey Jr. vs. Doug Mastriano

Poll source	Date(s) administered	Sample size	Margin of error	Bob Casey Jr. (D)	Doug Mastriano (R)	Undecided
Franklin & Marshall College	March 27 – April 7, 2023	643 (RV)	± 3.7%	47%	31%	22%
Cygnal (R)	April 12–13, 2023	600 (LV)	± 4.0%	49%	39%	12%

=== Results ===
2024 United States Senate election in Pennsylvania
Party	Candidate	Votes	%	±%
Republican	Dave McCormick	3,399,295	48.78%	+6.18%
Democratic	Bob Casey Jr. (incumbent)	3,384,180	48.56%	−7.16%
Libertarian	John Thomas	89,653	1.29%	+0.27%
Green	Leila Hazou	66,388	0.95%	+0.33%
Constitution	Marty Selker	23,621	0.34%	N/A
Write-in		5,598	0.08%	+0.05%
Total votes		6,968,735	100.0%	
Republican gain from Democratic				

==== Results by county ====
County	Dave McCormick Republican		Bob Casey Jr. Democratic		Various candidates Other parties		Margin		Total votes cast
County	#	%	#	%	#	%	#	%	Total votes cast
Adams	38,505	63.88%	19,947	33.09%	1,824	3.03%	18,556	30.79%	60,276
Allegheny	272,861	38.11%	425,280	59.40%	17,781	2.48%	-152,419	-21.29%	715,922
Armstrong	26,653	72.14%	9,136	24.73%	1,155	3.13%	17,517	47.42%	36,944
Beaver	53,593	56.56%	38,529	40.66%	2,635	2.78%	15,064	15.90%	94,757
Bedford	22,855	81.50%	4,624	16.49%	564	2.01%	18,231	65.01%	28,043
Berks	108,058	53.06%	89,063	43.74%	6,521	3.20%	18,995	9.33%	203,642
Blair	44,741	69.13%	18,445	28.50%	1,537	2.37%	26,296	40.63%	64,723
Bradford	22,099	71.50%	8,007	25.90%	804	2.60%	14,092	45.59%	30,910
Bucks	194,203	48.57%	196,444	49.13%	9,186	2.30%	−2,241	-0.56%	399,833
Butler	77,328	63.93%	40,973	33.87%	2,666	2.20%	36,355	30.05%	120,967
Cambria	46,482	65.47%	22,887	32.24%	1,635	2.30%	23,595	33.23%	71,004
Cameron	1,558	70.37%	580	26.20%	76	3.43%	978	44.17%	2,214
Carbon	22,603	64.45%	11,570	32.99%	898	2.56%	11,033	31.46%	35,071
Centre	38,054	47.32%	40,382	50.22%	1,979	2.46%	-2,328	-2.89%	80,415
Chester	138,271	42.60%	178,765	55.07%	7,551	2.33%	-40,494	−12.65%	324,587
Clarion	14,179	72.06%	4,683	23.80%	815	4.14%	9,496	48.26%	19,677
Clearfield	29,063	72.27%	10,111	25.14%	1,038	2.58%	18,952	47.13%	40,212
Clinton	12,250	66.40%	5,722	31.02%	476	2.58%	6,528	35.38%	18,448
Columbia	20,617	63.63%	10,969	33.85%	814	2.51%	9,648	29.78%	32,400
Crawford	28,234	63.10%	13,370	31.30%	1,110	2.60%	14,864	31.80%	42,714
Cumberland	78,178	53.04%	64,713	43.90%	4,512	3.06%	13,465	9.14%	147,403
Dauphin	66,949	44.95%	77,022	51.71%	4,985	3.34%	−10,073	-6.76%	148,956
Delaware	121,482	37.21%	197,424	60.48%	7,551	2.31%	−75,942	-23.26%	326,457
Elk	11,939	69.75%	4,679	28.33%	499	2.92%	7,260	42.42%	17,117
Erie	65,603	47.94%	67,868	49.60%	3,371	2.46%	−2,265	-1.66%	136,842
Fayette	40,804	64.82%	20,752	32.97%	1,389	2.21%	20,052	31.86%	62,945
Forest	1,808	68.25%	741	27.97%	100	3.78%	1,067	40.28%	2,649
Franklin	57,217	68.84%	23,591	28.38%	2,313	2.78%	33,626	40.46%	83,121
Fulton	6,773	83.45%	1,197	14.75%	146	1.80%	5,576	68.70%	8,116
Greene	11,643	67.91%	5,075	29.60%	427	2.49%	6,568	38.31%	17,145
Huntingdon	16,910	74.43%	5,582	24.24%	986	4.28%	11,328	49.19%	23,028
Indiana	27,881	66.28%	13,181	31.33%	1,006	2.39%	14,700	34.94%	42,068
Jefferson	17,618	76.34%	4,834	20.95%	626	2.71%	12,784	55.39%	23,078
Juniata	9,252	76.82%	2,478	20.58%	313	2.60%	6,774	56.25%	12,043
Lackawanna	51,944	44.82%	61,653	53.20%	2,289	1.98%	−9,709	−8.38%	115,886
Lancaster	162,105	56.22%	118,580	41.12%	7,668	2.66%	43,525	15.10%	288,353
Lawrence	29,405	62.84%	16,176	34.57%	1,211	2.59%	13,229	28.27%	46,792
Lebanon	46,172	63.13%	24,745	33.83%	2,222	3.04%	21,427	29.30%	73,139
Lehigh	87,147	46.46%	94,875	50.58%	5,562	2.96%	−7,728	−4.12%	187,584
Luzerne	87,048	56.17%	64,495	41.61%	3,442	2.22%	22,553	14.55%	154,985
Lycoming	40,672	68.36%	17,354	29.17%	1,472	2.47%	23,318	39.19%	59,498
McKean	13,799	70.51%	5,231	26.73%	541	2.47%	8,568	43.78%	19,571
Mercer	36,468	62.78%	20,302	34.95%	1,318	2.27%	16,166	27.83%	58,088
Mifflin	16,413	74.79%	4,991	22.74%	542	2.47%	11,422	52.05%	21,946
Monroe	40,884	48.07%	41,712	49.04%	2,455	2.89%	−828	-0.97%	85,051
Montgomery	196,422	37.78%	311,859	59.98%	11,687	2.25%	−115,437	−22.20%	519,968
Montour	5,847	59.06%	3,813	38.52%	240	2.42%	2,034	20.54%	9,900
Northampton	85,787	49.13%	84,762	48.54%	4,066	2.33%	1,025	0.59%	174,615
Northumberland	28,706	66.31%	13,432	31.03%	1,156	2.66%	15,274	35.28%	43,294
Perry	18,355	71.48%	6,470	25.19%	855	3.33%	11,885	46.28%	25,680
Philadelphia	129,098	18.70%	541,567	78.45%	19,651	2.85%	−412,469	-59.75%	690,316
Pike	20,869	60.30%	6,470	37.30%	831	2.40%	7,960	23.00%	34,609
Potter	7,109	78.51%	1,695	18.72%	251	2.77%	5,414	59.79%	9,055
Schuylkill	48,553	66.66%	22,224	30.51%	2,063	2.83%	26,329	36.15%	72,840
Snyder	14,211	71.24%	5,309	26.62%	427	2.14%	8,902	44.63%	19,947
Somerset	30,667	75.14%	9,059	22.20%	1,090	2.66%	21,608	52.94%	40,816
Sullivan	2,612	70.31%	1,021	27.48%	82	2.21%	1,591	43.83%	3,715
Susquehanna	15,545	69.97%	6,129	27.59%	542	2.44%	6,671	42.38%	22,216
Tioga	15,778	73.62%	5,066	23.64%	588	2.74%	10,712	49.98%	21,432
Union	12,747	60.49%	7,872	37.36%	453	2.15%	4,875	23.13%	21,072
Venango	17,825	66.93%	7,902	29.67%	904	3.39%	9,923	37.26%	26,631
Warren	13,655	66.07%	6,415	31.04%	597	2.89%	7,240	35.03%	20,667
Washington	71,798	59.61%	45,926	38.13%	2,717	2.56%	25,872	21.48%	120,441
Wayne	19,331	65.90%	9,385	31.99%	619	2.11%	9,946	33.91%	29,335
Westmoreland	128,040	62.28%	75,926	36.38%	4,893	2.34%	52,036	24.90%	208,937
Wyoming	9,919	66.04%	4,750	31.63%	350	2.33%	5,169	35.41%	15,019
York	148,098	59.73%	91,779	37.02%	8,051	3.25%	56,319	22.71%	247,928
Totals	3,399,295	48.82%	3,384,180	48.60%	179,662	2.58%	15,115	0.22%	6,963,137

Counties that flipped from Democratic to Republican

- Beaver (largest municipality: Aliquippa)
- Berks (largest municipality: Reading)
- Northampton (largest municipality: Bethlehem)

==== By congressional district ====
McCormick won nine of 17 congressional districts, with the remaining eight going to Casey, including one that elected a Republican.

District	Casey Jr.	McCormick	Representative
1st	49.3%	48.4%	Brian Fitzpatrick
2nd	67.9%	29.3%	Brendan Boyle
3rd	86.7%	10.4%	Dwight Evans
4th	56.8%	40.8%	Madeleine Dean
5th	62.9%	34.8%	Mary Gay Scanlon
6th	54.0%	43.5%	Chrissy Houlahan
7th	47.8%	49.5%	Susan Wild (118th Congress)
7th	47.8%	49.5%	Ryan Mackenzie (119th Congress)
8th	46.6%	51.1%	Matt Cartwright (118th Congress)
8th	46.6%	51.1%	Rob Bresnahan (119th Congress)
9th	31.3%	66.0%	Dan Meuser
10th	46.3%	50.5%	Scott Perry
11th	38.6%	58.5%	Lloyd Smucker
12th	59.1%	38.3%	Summer Lee
13th	27.8%	69.6%	John Joyce
14th	34.3%	63.3%	Guy Reschenthaler
15th	31.2%	66.1%	Glenn Thompson
16th	38.9%	58.7%	Mike Kelly
17th	52.3%	45.4%	Chris Deluzio

== Analysis ==
In Pennsylvania, a statewide recount is triggered under state law if the margin falls within 0.5% of the total vote. Preliminary results for the election reached this threshold on November 13, 2024, with McCormick at 48.9% leading Casey's 48.6%, as outstanding ballots continued to be counted across the state. Secretary of the Commonwealth Al Schmidt officially ordered the recount later that evening, with Casey declining to concede. The deadline for the counties to begin their recounts is on November 20, the third Wednesday after the election according to state law, however, counties can start their recounts as early as November 18, with all counties required to submit their results to the Department of State by noon on November 26 as the results must be reported by the Secretary of the Commonwealth by noon on November 27. Additionally, the counties must use different machines for the recount than were used on Election Day.

On Monday, November 18, following a series of challenges and disputes, the Pennsylvania Supreme Court directed all of the state's county election officials not to count certain mail-in ballots which arrived on time yet lacked a correct handwritten date on the return envelope.

The last instance of a statewide recount being held was for the 2022 Republican primary for Pennsylvania's Class 3 Senate seat, of which McCormick was also a candidate. Conversely to his stance in the 2024 general election, he unsuccessfully sued to have undated mail-in ballots counted. After completion of the recount he would concede to Mehmet Oz, with the final results expanding Oz's margin by 49 votes.

McCormick benefitted from the presence of former President Donald Trump on the ballot, who carried the state over Vice President Harris by just over 120,000 votes (for a margin of roughly 1.7%) in the concurrent presidential election. Indeed, McCormick cleared 60% in most counties in the state’s less-populated interior and even 70% in many. Unlike in Ohio and Montana, however, McCormick had to seek support beyond the Trump base as he was running in a swing state. Casey and Trump both won Bucks, Erie, and Monroe Counties. McCormick campaigned with Nikki Haley in the suburbs of Pittsburgh and Philadelphia, aiming to appeal to voters uneasy about Trump by positioning himself as a more establishment candidate. Casey aired ads in late October to highlight his votes with the Trump administration, while McCormick tied Casey to Harris, highlighting his votes with the Biden administration.

However, both candidates received fewer votes than their respective parties’ presidential candidates in the concurrent 2024 presidential election. Senator McCormick received about 144,000 fewer votes than President Trump, while Senator Casey received almost 39,000 fewer votes than Vice President Harris. McCormick overperformed Trump's margins in the Philadelphia suburban counties of Chester, Delaware, and Montgomery.

== Notes ==
Partisan clients
