= Joseph Zord =

American politician

Joseph V. Zord, Jr.

Member of the Pennsylvania House of Representatives from the 41st district
- In office 1969–1980
- Preceded by: District created
- Succeeded by: Robert F. Frazier

Member of the Pennsylvania House of Representatives from the Allegheny County district
- In office 1965–1968

Personal details
- Born: May 2, 1910 Pittsburgh, Pennsylvania, U.S.
- Died: February 7, 1994 (aged 83) Pittsburgh, Pennsylvania, U.S.
- Party: Republican

Joseph V. Zord, Jr. (May 2, 1910 – February 7, 1994) was a Republican member of the Pennsylvania House of Representatives.
