= John T. Walsh (politician) =

American politician

Member of the Pennsylvania House of Representatives from the 37th district
- In office 1969–1974
- Preceded by: District created
- Succeeded by: Emil Mrkonic

Member of the Pennsylvania House of Representatives from the Allegheny County district
- In office 1953–1968

Personal details
- Born: December 21, 1898 Pittsburgh, Pennsylvania
- Died: 1983 (aged 84)
- Party: Democratic

John T. Walsh (December 21, 1898 – 1983) is a former Democratic member of the Pennsylvania House of Representatives.
