= Raymond Book =

American politician

Raymond T. Book

Member of the Pennsylvania House of Representatives from the 41st district
- In office 1983–1989
- Preceded by: Robert F. Frazier
- Succeeded by: Ralph Kaiser

Personal details
- Born: February 14, 1925 Pittsburgh, Pennsylvania, U.S.
- Died: May 6, 2018 (aged 93) Allegheny County, Pennsylvania, U.S.
- Party: Republican
- Spouse: Mary Ann
- Children: Larry (Kathy); Karen (Bill); Linda; Raymond II; Kevin (Myra); and Charlotte (Mario)
- Education: Robert Morris College
- Occupation: WWII Veteran: Invasion of Normandy; Battle of the Bulge; J&L Steel; Book Real Estate; Elected three (3) terms to the Pennsylvania House of Representatives 1983–1989; Chairman of Allegheny County Assessment Office, 1989–1984; Served as Board Member to the Pennsylvania Real Estate Commission; Man of the Year Award recipient from Brentwood VFW 1988
- Website: Lead Sponsor for Pennsylvania Organ Donor Bill

Raymond Thomas Book (February 14, 1925 – May 6, 2018) was an American politician who served as a Republican member of the Pennsylvania House of Representatives.
