= Noah Wenger =

American politician (1934–2024)

Noah W. Wenger

Member of the Pennsylvania House of Representatives from the 99th district
- In office January 4, 1977 – November 30, 1982
- Preceded by: Harry Gring
- Succeeded by: Terry Scheetz

Member of the Pennsylvania Senate from the 36th district
- In office January 4, 1983 – November 30, 2006
- Preceded by: Philip Price, Jr.
- Succeeded by: Mike Brubaker

Personal details
- Born: October 20, 1934 New Holland, Pennsylvania, U.S.
- Died: February 28, 2024 (aged 89) Stevens, Pennsylvania, U.S.
- Party: Republican
- Spouse: Barbara Wenger

Noah W. Wenger (October 20, 1934 – February 28, 2024) was an American politician, farmer and businessman. He was a Republican member of the Pennsylvania State Senate who represented the 36th District from 1982 to 2006. He represented the 99th district of the Pennsylvania House of Representative from 1977 to 1982.

Wenger died in Stevens, Pennsylvania on February 28, 2024, at the age of 89.
