= Leroy M. Zimmerman =

American politician

Member of the Pennsylvania House of Representatives from the 99th district
- In office January 3, 1995 – December 6, 2002
- Preceded by: Terry Scheetz
- Succeeded by: Gordon Denlinger

Personal details
- Born: December 27, 1932 East Earl Township, Pennsylvania, U.S.
- Died: December 6, 2002 (aged 69)
- Party: Republican
- Spouse: Bonita J.

Leroy M. Zimmerman (December 27, 1932 – December 6, 2002), was a Republican member of the Pennsylvania House of Representatives. He attended Terre Hill High School. He was first elected to represent the 99th legislative district in 1994, a position he held until his death in 2002. In 2005, a four-year-old bridge over the Conestoga River on U.S. Route 322 was renamed in honor of Zimmerman.
