= Thomas C. Creighton =

American politician (1945–2022)

Tom Creighton

Member of the Pennsylvania House of Representatives from the 37th district
- In office January 2, 2001 – 2013
- Preceded by: Katie True
- Succeeded by: Mindy Fee

Personal details
- Born: February 19, 1945 Altoona, Pennsylvania, U.S.
- Died: July 24, 2022 (aged 77) Manheim, Pennsylvania, U.S.
- Party: Republican
- Spouse: Sandra W. Creighton
- Education: Juniata College; Indiana University
- Website: www.repcreighton.com

Thomas C. Creighton (February 19, 1945 – July 24, 2022) was a Republican Party member of the Pennsylvania House of Representatives for the 37th District, serving from 2001 through 2013.

== Career ==
Creighton held a number of positions prior to his political career, including a plant engineer/manager for Kellogg Company a research engineer for the National Bureau of Standards and a research scientist for Armstrong World Industries. Creighton has also been an instructor at Indiana University of Pennsylvania and a science teacher in the Altoona Area School District. His prior elected offices include Judge of Elections and Township Supervisor in Rapho Township, Pennsylvania.

Creighton was elected in 2000 to replace Katie True, who retired from the House in order to run for Pennsylvania Auditor General. He was re-elected three times.

Creighton sat on the House Commerce, Judiciary, and State Government committees.

== Personal ==
Creighton was a resident of Rapho Township, Pennsylvania, in Lancaster County. He earned a B.S. degree in physics from Juniata College and a master's degree in physics and mathematics from Indiana University of Pennsylvania. He died on July 24, 2022, at the age of 77.
