= Mindy Fee =

American politician

Member of the Pennsylvania House of Representatives from the 37th district
- Incumbent
- Assumed office January 1, 2013
- Preceded by: Tom Creighton

Personal details
- Party: Republican
- Education: Millersville University
- Occupation: furniture wholesaler

Melinda "Mindy" Fee is a Republican member of the Pennsylvania House of Representatives. She has represented the 37th District, based in northern Lancaster County, since 2013.

Prior to taking office, Fee attended the Manheim Central School District and received a bachelor's degree in economics from Millersville University. She has spent much of her working career in sales management, most recently with TransAmerican Office Furniture. She is the widow of former Manheim mayor and local district magistrate Tom Fee, and has three children.

In the 2012 Republican primary for the 37th District, brought about by incumbent state representative Tom Creighton's decision to retire, Fee defeated Stephen Black and Barry McFarland, after first winning a straw poll of local Republican Party committee members. She went on to win the general election, and was re-elected in 2014.

== Committee assignments ==
- Agriculture & Rural Affairs
- Game & Fisheries
- Professional Licensure
- Tourism & Recreational Development, Subcommittee on Arts and Entertainment - Chair
- Transportation, Subcommittee on Transportation Safety - Chair
