= Phillip Price Jr. =

American politician (1934–2023)

Member of the Pennsylvania Senate from the 36th district
- In office January 2, 1979 – November 30, 1982
- Preceded by: Thomas McCormack
- Succeeded by: Noah Wenger

Personal details
- Born: October 28, 1934 Philadelphia, Pennsylvania, U.S.
- Died: February 1, 2023 (aged 88)

Phillip Price Jr. (October 28, 1934 – February 1, 2023) was an American politician who was a member of the Pennsylvania State Senate, serving from 1979 to 1982.

== Biography ==
A lifelong Philadelphia resident, Price graduated from Harvard University and the University of Pennsylvania Law School, and began his career as an attorney at his father's law firm, Dechert LLP.

Price was a descendent of American Civil War General George Gordon Meade, 12th U.S. President Zachary Taylor and Joseph Harrison, Jr. His grandfather was Eli Kirk Price II, who was responsible for purchasing the Albert Laessle Billy goat sculpture for Rittenhouse Square.

Price supported many Philadelphia-area nonprofits and served on the boards of many organizations, including the Fairmount Park Conservancy, the Association for Public Art, the Civil War Museum of Philadelphia, The Woodlands Cemetery, The Woodlands Trust For Historic Preservation, The Ludwick Foundation, and Saint James School.

Price died on February 1, 2023, at the age of 88.
