= Harry Gring =

American politician

Harry H. Gring

Member of the Pennsylvania House of Representatives from the 99th district
- In office 1969–1976
- Preceded by: District created
- Succeeded by: Noah W. Wenger

Member of the Pennsylvania House of Representatives from the Lancaster County district
- In office 1967–1968

Personal details
- Born: January 18, 1918 Reinholds, Pennsylvania
- Died: August 7, 1992 (aged 74) Denver, Pennsylvania
- Party: Republican

Harry H. Gring (January 18, 1918 – August 7, 1992) was a former Republican member of the Pennsylvania House of Representatives.
