= East Hempfield Township, Pennsylvania =

Township in Pennsylvania, US

Coordinates: 40°07′36″N 76°22′28″W

East Hempfield Township, Lancaster County, Pennsylvania
- Township
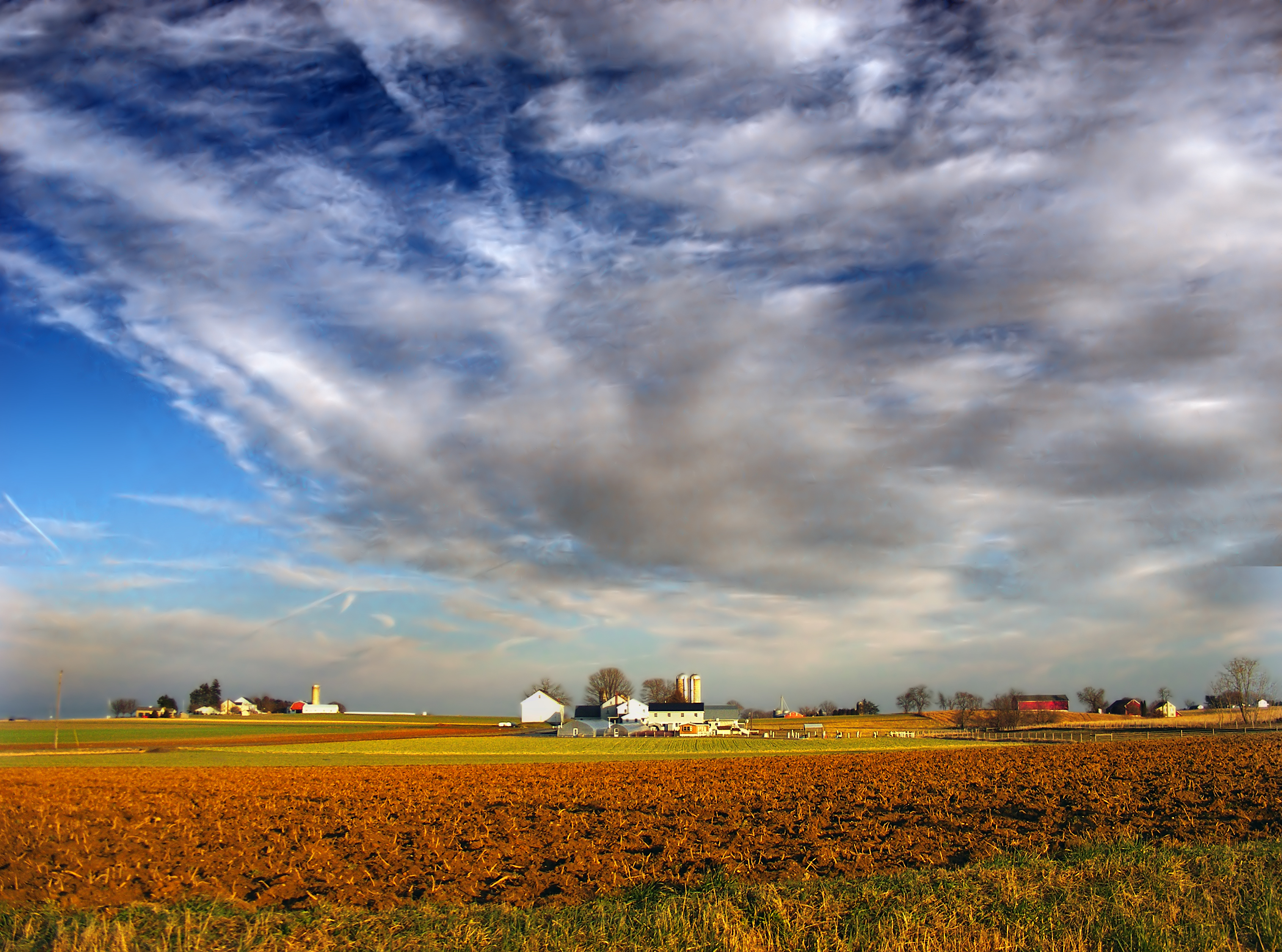
- A farm in East Hempfield Township

- Seal

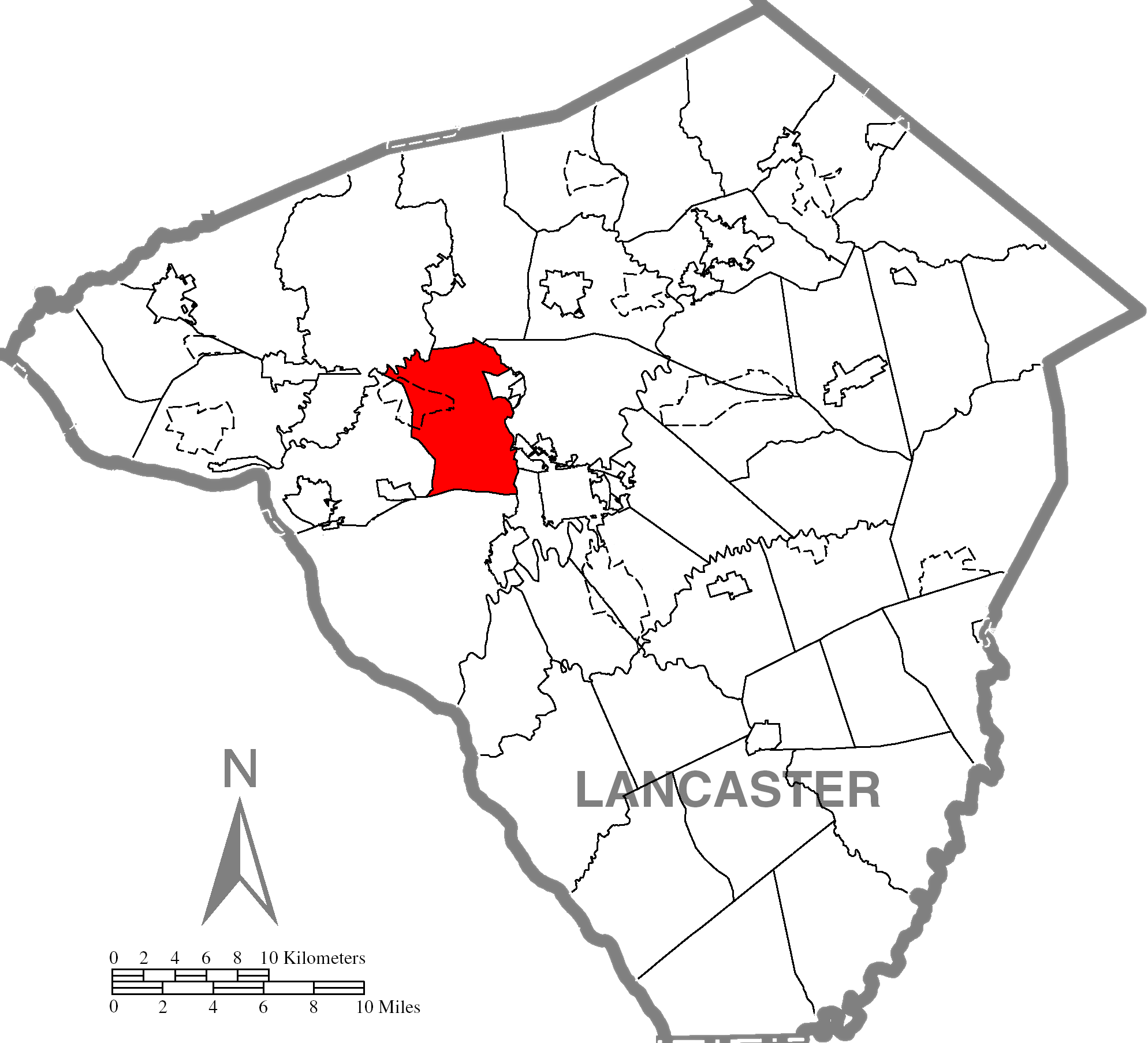
- Map of Lancaster County highlighting East Hempfield Township
- Country: United States
- State: Pennsylvania
- County: Lancaster
- Settled: 1717
- Incorporated: 1818

Area
  - Total: 21.16 sq mi (54.81 km^{2})
  - Land: 21.07 sq mi (54.57 km^{2})
  - Water: 0.093 sq mi (0.24 km^{2})

Population (2020)
  - Total: 26,350 ▲
  - Estimate (2021): 26,475
  - Density: 1,156.5/sq mi (446.53/km^{2})
- Time zone: UTC-5 (Eastern (EST))
  - Summer (DST): UTC-4 (EDT)
- Area code: 717
- FIPS code: 42-071-21232
- Website: www.easthempfield.org

East Hempfield Township is a township in west-central Lancaster County, Pennsylvania, United States. At the 2020 census the population was 26,350.

East Hempfield is one of the six immediate suburbs of the city of Lancaster, all sharing the same official designation as Lancaster, Pennsylvania by the United States Postal Service.

== History ==
The Landis Mill Covered Bridge, Shenk's Mill Covered Bridge, Christian Habeck Farm, and Samuel N. Mumma Tobacco Warehouse are listed on the National Register of Historic Places.

== Geography ==
According to the U.S. Census Bureau, the township has a total area of 21.1 square miles (55 km^{2}), all land. It includes the unincorporated communities of Mechanicsville, Landisville, Bamford, Centerville, Chestnut Ridge, Rohrerstown, Donerville, Chestnut View, and Wheatland, as well as part of Salunga.

== Demographics ==
Historical population
Census	Pop.	Note	%±
1850	2,266		—
1860	2,613		15.3%
1870	2,602		−0.4%
1880	3,176		22.1%
1890	3,154		−0.7%
1900	3,168		0.4%
1910	3,327		5.0%
1920	3,408		2.4%
1930	4,095		20.2%
1940	4,462		9.0%
1950	4,322		−3.1%
1960	8,417		94.7%
1970	11,739		39.5%
1980	15,152		29.1%
1990	18,597		22.7%
2000	21,399		15.1%
2010	23,522		9.9%
2020	26,350		12.0%
2021 (est.)	26,475		0.5%
U.S. Decennial Census

As of the census of 2000, there were 21,399 people, 8,552 households, and 6,054 families residing in the township. The population density was 1,011.6 inhabitants per square mile (390.6/km^{2}). There were 8,761 housing units at an average density of 414.2 units per square mile (159.9 units/km^{2}). The racial makeup of the township was 93.45% White, 1.51% Black or African American, 0.11% Native American, 2.56% Asian, 1.51% from other races, and 0.86% from two or more races. 2.78% of the population were Hispanic or Latino of any race.

There were 8,552 households, out of which 30.9% had children under the age of 18 living with them, 62.0% were married couples living together, 6.3% had a female householder with no husband present, and 29.2% were non-families. 24.1% of all households were made up of individuals, and 9.5% had someone living alone who was 65 years of age or older. The average household size was 2.47 and the average family size was 2.96.

In the township the population was spread out, with 23.9% under the age of 18, 6.7% from 18 to 24, 27.4% from 25 to 44, 26.7% from 45 to 64, and 15.4% who were 65 years of age or older. The median age was 41 years. For every 100 females, there were 96.2 males. For every 100 females age 18 and over, there were 93.6 males.

The median income for a household in the township was $54,431, and the median income for a family was $68,965. Males had a median income of $43,958 versus $29,496 for females. The per capita income for the township was $28,192. About 1.8% of families and 3.9% of the population were below the poverty line, including 4.1% of those under age 18 and 5.1% of those age 65 or over.

== Points of interest ==
- Amos Herr House & Park, donated by Amos Herr upon his death, contains an old farmhouse built in 1852, adjoining barns and the East Hempfield Township municipal building.

== Notable person ==
- Melissa Minnich Coleman, architect

== Manufacturing ==
- Kellogg's
- Y&S Candies
