= Brett Miller (politician) =

American politician

Member of the Pennsylvania House of Representatives from the 41st district
- Incumbent
- Assumed office January 6, 2015
- Preceded by: Ryan Aument

Personal details
- Born: July 22, 1961 (age 65)
- Party: Republican
- Spouse: Jennifer
- Education: Liberty University
- Occupation: Teacher

Brett Miller is a Republican member of the Pennsylvania House of Representatives.

== Background ==
He was born in the Poconos region and moved to Lancaster County to start his career as a guidance counselor. He spent more than 20 years at Warwick Middle School where he was also a coach for track and field. Miller earned degrees from Liberty University and certifications from Penn State and Millersville.

Miller served three terms as township supervisor in East Hempfield Township.

== 2014 election ==
Rep. Ryan Aument announced he would not seek reelection as he made a bid for the 36th district State Senate seat. Miller successfully sought the Republican nomination for the 41st House district and defeated Democratic challenger Alice Yoder in the Lancaster suburban and Republican-leaning district.

== Committee assignments ==
- Aging & Older Adult Services
- Consumer Affairs
- Local Government
- State Government, Subcommittee on Public Pensions, Benefits and Risk Management - Chair
