= Pennsylvania's 36th Senate district =

American legislative district

Pennsylvania's 36th State Senate district
Senator
James Andrew Malone; D–East Petersburg
- Population (2021): 269,182

Pennsylvania State Senate District 36 includes part of Lancaster County. The seat was vacant since the resignation of Republican Ryan Aument in December 2024. A special election for the seat took place on March 25, 2025, and was won by Democrat James Malone, who currently represents the district.

== District profile ==
The district includes the following areas:

- Akron
- Columbia
- Conoy Township
- Earl Township
- East Donegal Township
- East Hempfield Township
- East Petersburg
- Elizabeth Township
- Elizabethtown
- Ephrata
- Ephrata Township
- Leola
- Lititz
- Manheim
- Manheim Township
- Mount Joy Township
- Penn Township
- Rapho Township
- Warwick Township
- West Donegal Township
- West Earl Township
- West Hempfield Township

== Senators since 1955 ==
Representative	Party	Years	District home	Note	Counties
J. Irving Whalley	Republican	1955–1960		Resigned August 18, 1960.	Bedford, Fulton, Somerset
Stanley Stroup	Republican	1961–1966		Redistricted to 30th district following the 1967–68 session.	Bedford, Fulton, Somerset
Stanley Stroup	Republican	1967–1968		Redistricted to 30th district following the 1967–68 session.	Philadelphia (part)
Louis G. Hill	Democratic	1969–1978		Resigned January 8, 1978.	Philadelphia (part)
Thomas J. McCormack	Democratic	1978		Seated April 3, 1978.	Philadelphia (part)
Phillip Price Jr.	Republican	1979–1982			Philadelphia (part)
Noah Wenger	Republican	1983–1992	West Cocalico Township		Chester (part), Lancaster (part)
Noah Wenger	Republican	1993–2004	West Cocalico Township		Lancaster (part)
Noah Wenger	Republican	2005–2006	West Cocalico Township		Chester (part), Lancaster (part)
Mike Brubaker	Republican	2007–2014	Warwick Township		Chester (part), Lancaster (part)
Ryan Aument	Republican	2015–2024	West Hempfield Township	Resigned December 31, 2024.	Lancaster (part)
James Malone	Democratic	2025–present	East Petersburg	Won special election on March 25, 2025.	Lancaster
