= East Petersburg, Pennsylvania =

Borough in Pennsylvania, US

- Borough
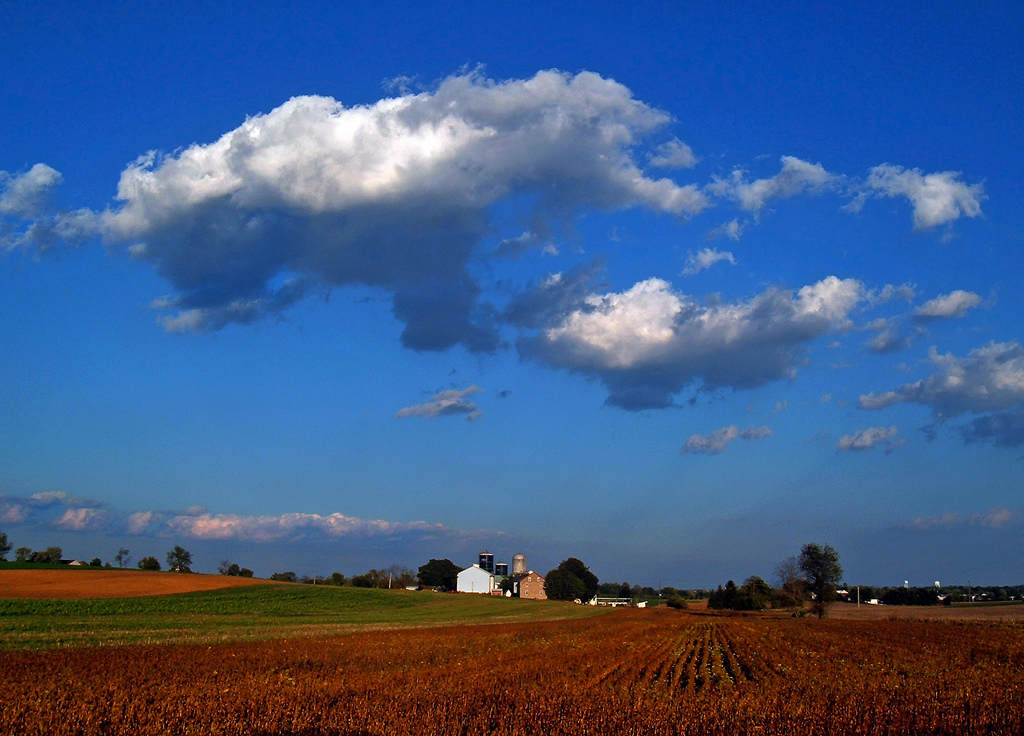
- A farm near East Petersburg

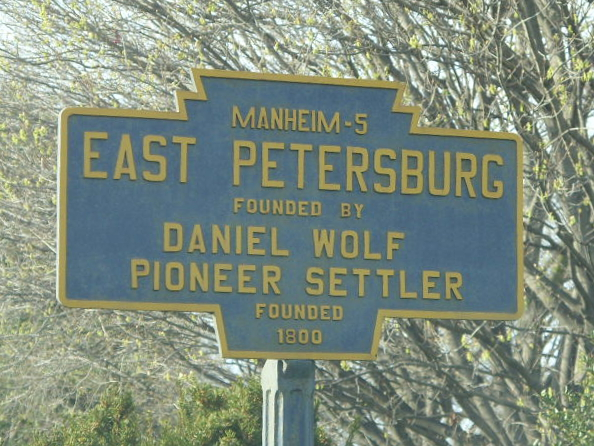
- Keystone Marker

- Location in Lancaster County, Pennsylvania

- Location in Pennsylvania Location in the United States
- Coordinates: 40°06′00″N 76°21′10″W
- Country: United States
- State: Pennsylvania
- County: Lancaster

Government
  - Mayor: Bill Trovato (D)

Area
  - Total: 1.21 sq mi (3.13 km^{2})
  - Land: 1.21 sq mi (3.13 km^{2})
  - Water: 0 sq mi (0.00 km^{2})
- Elevation: 374 ft (114 m)

Population (2020)
  - Total: 4,573
  - Density: 3,786.0/sq mi (1,461.79/km^{2})
- Time zone: UTC-5 (EST)
  - Summer (DST): UTC-4 (EDT)
- ZIP code: 17520
- Area code: 717
- FIPS code: 42-21688
- Website: www.eastpetersburgborough.org

East Petersburg is a borough in Lancaster County, Pennsylvania, United States. The population was 4,591 at the 2020 census.

== Geography ==
East Petersburg is located in north-central Lancaster County at 40°6′0″N 76°21′10″W (40.100079, -76.352649). Pennsylvania Route 72 is the borough's Main Street, leading northwest 5 miles (8 km) to Manheim and southeast the same distance to the center of Lancaster. Pennsylvania Route 722 (State Street) crosses Main Street in the center of town, and leads east 3 miles (5 km) to Neffsville and southwest 1.8 miles (2.9 km) to an interchange with the Pennsylvania Route 283 freeway.

According to the United States Census Bureau, the borough has a total area of 1.2 square miles (3.1 km^{2}), all land.

== Demographics ==
Historical population
| Census | Pop. | Note | %± |
|---|---|---|---|
| 1890 | 558 | | — |
| 1950 | 1,268 | | — |
| 1960 | 2,053 | | 61.9% |
| 1970 | 3,407 | | 66.0% |
| 1980 | 3,600 | | 5.7% |
| 1990 | 4,197 | | 16.6% |
| 2000 | 4,450 | | 6.0% |
| 2010 | 4,506 | | 1.3% |
| 2020 | 4,573 | | 1.5% |
| 2021 (est.) | 4,598 | ▲ | 0.5% |

=== 2020 census ===
As of the 2020 census, East Petersburg had a population of 4,573. The median age was 40.0 years. 23.1% of residents were under the age of 18 and 17.5% of residents were 65 years of age or older. For every 100 females there were 93.9 males, and for every 100 females age 18 and over there were 92.7 males age 18 and over.

100.0% of residents lived in urban areas, while 0.0% lived in rural areas.

There were 1,738 households in East Petersburg, of which 32.3% had children under the age of 18 living in them. Of all households, 57.6% were married-couple households, 14.1% were households with a male householder and no spouse or partner present, and 21.7% were households with a female householder and no spouse or partner present. About 19.5% of all households were made up of individuals and 8.3% had someone living alone who was 65 years of age or older.

There were 1,792 housing units, of which 3.0% were vacant. The homeowner vacancy rate was 0.6% and the rental vacancy rate was 5.9%.

Racial composition as of the 2020 census
| Race | Number | Percent |
|---|---|---|
| White | 3,777 | 82.6% |
| Black or African American | 207 | 4.5% |
| American Indian and Alaska Native | 7 | 0.2% |
| Asian | 61 | 1.3% |
| Native Hawaiian and Other Pacific Islander | 0 | 0.0% |
| Some other race | 205 | 4.5% |
| Two or more races | 316 | 6.9% |
| Hispanic or Latino (of any race) | 505 | 11.0% |

=== 2000 census ===
As of the 2000 census, there were 4,450 people, 1,708 households, and 1,327 families residing in the borough. The population density was 3,688.6 people per square mile (1,424.2 people/km^{2}). There were 1,766 housing units at an average density of 1,463.8 per square mile (565.2/km^{2}). The racial makeup of the borough was 95.03% White, 1.35% Black or African American, 0.16% Native American, 1.10% Asian, 0.07% Pacific Islander, 1.17% from other races, and 1.12% from two or more races. 2.85% of the population were Hispanic or Latino of any race.

There were 1,708 households, out of which 34.4% had children under the age of 18 living with them, 64.5% were married couples living together, 9.5% had a female householder with no husband present, and 22.3% were non-families. 18.5% of all households were made up of individuals, and 6.4% had someone living alone who was 65 years of age or older. The average household size was 2.60 and the average family size was 2.95.

In the borough the population was spread out, with 25.1% under the age of 18, 6.2% from 18 to 24, 29.9% from 25 to 44, 25.2% from 45 to 64, and 13.6% who were 65 years of age or older. The median age was 38 years. For every 100 females there were 95.6 males. For every 100 females age 18 and over, there were 89.2 males.

The median income for a household in the borough was $52,222, and the median income for a family was $53,910. Males had a median income of $38,700 versus $25,455 for females. The per capita income for the borough was $21,979. About 2.0% of families and 2.7% of the population were below the poverty line, including 4.9% of those under age 18 and 3.3% of those age 65 or over.

== Schools ==
Schools in East Petersburg are part of the Hempfield School District. Children are served by the following schools within the district:

=== Elementary ===
- East Petersburg Elementary

=== Middle school ===
- Centerville Middle School

=== High school ===
- Hempfield High School

== Government ==
East Petersburg is governed by a seven-person borough council and mayor. As of January 2018 the council president was Cappy Panus and the mayor was James Andrew Malone.

East Petersburg Borough Council members are elected to four-year staggered terms. The borough council elects from members a president of council and a vice-president. The borough council serves as the legislative body elected by citizens of the borough. It is responsible for establishing policies, enacting by ordinance or resolution laws and regulations to implement approved policies, providing for annual budgets and appropriations of funds for lawful expenditures, appointing members to boards, and commissions established by the borough council. The mayor is responsible for law enforcement and holds a non-voting membership in the council, but with tie-breaking and veto powers per the Pennsylvania Borough Code.

The borough council meets twice per month to conduct business - a formal meeting the first Tuesday and a business meeting the third Thursday.

== Community ==
East Petersburg Day is celebrated annually in September with a parade and community festivities in East Petersburg Community Park. East Petersburg Swimming Pool, which is operated by the Hempfield Area Recreation Commission, is home to the East Petersburg Swim Team. The Penn Legacy Soccer Club operates several playing fields within the borough. The East Petersburg Historical Society and East Petersburg Sportman Association are also located within the borough.

== Churches ==
There are six churches within the borough:

- East Petersburg Mennonite Church
- Zion Evangelical Lutheran Church
- Trinity United Church of Christ
- Grace Evangelical Congregational
- Real Life Church of God
- Open Door Mission Pentecostal

East Petersburg Churches is a community resource website from the pastors and churches in the borough.

== Notable people ==
- James Andrew Malone, former mayor and State Senator
- Christian Strenge, fraktur artist
