= Ryan Aument =

American politician

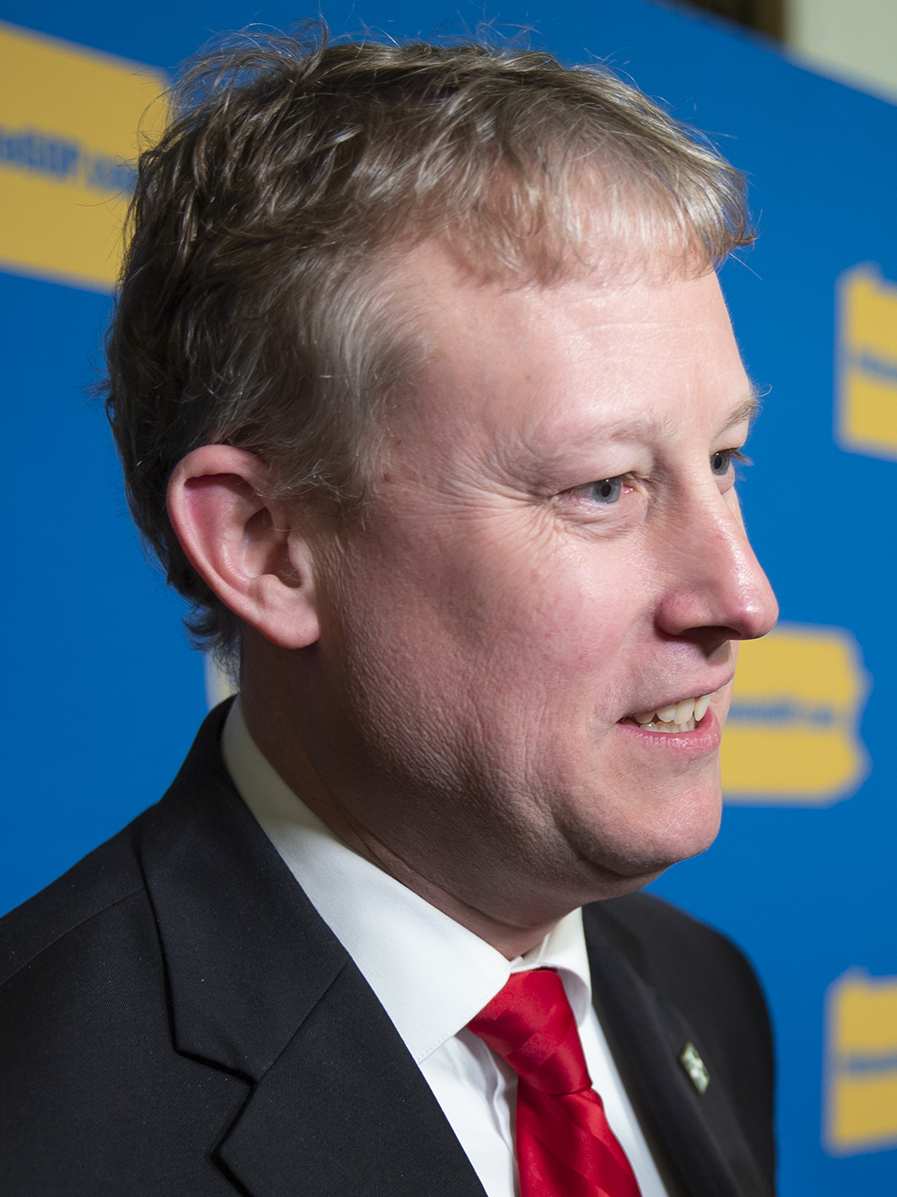
- Aument speaks with the media at the Pennsylvania State Capitol

Member of the Pennsylvania Senate from the 36th district
- In office January 6, 2015 – December 31, 2024
- Preceded by: Mike Brubaker
- Succeeded by: James Malone

Member of the Pennsylvania House of Representatives from the 41st district
- In office January 4, 2011 – November 30, 2014
- Preceded by: Katie True
- Succeeded by: Brett Miller

Personal details
- Born: December 16, 1976 (age 49)
- Party: Republican
- Spouse: Kate Aument
- Education: The Citadel
- Awards: Bronze Star
- Website: www.senatoraument.com

Military service
- Allegiance: United States
- Branch/service: United States Army
- Rank: Captain
- Battles/wars: Iraq War

Ryan P. Aument (born December 16, 1976) is an American politician and former Republican member of the Pennsylvania State Senate. He represented the 36th district from 2015 to 2024, when he resigned to become State Director for U.S. Senator Dave McCormick. Prior to his election to the State Senate in 2014, he served as a member of the Pennsylvania House of Representatives, for the 41st District, which includes portions of Lancaster County. Throughout his political career, Aument was involved in various legislative initiatives, including education reform, and has been a firm opponent of abortion and LGBT rights.

He also served on the bipartisan COVID-19 task force established by Governor Tom Wolf and played a role in coordinating vaccination efforts in his home county.

Aument has a military background, having served as a captain in the United States Army during Operation Iraqi Freedom, where he earned several military honors.

== Political career ==
Ryan entered public service as the Lancaster County Clerk of Court, the 56th individual to hold this position. In November 2010, Aument defeated Gerald E. Policoff in the general election to succeed Katie True. Aument sponsored teacher evaluation legislation in his first term. The bill was ultimately signed into law as Act No. 82 in the 2011–2012 legislative session. In November 2012, Aument defeated Marcy Dubroff and retained his house seat.

In the 2014 election, Aument ran for retiring Mike Brubaker's seat in the State Senate. He defeated Gordon Denlinger in the Republican primary, then defeated Democrat Gary J. Schrekengost in the general election.

On February 9, 2021, Aument was chosen by Governor Tom Wolf to be a part of the bipartisan COVID-19 taskforce. As a part of this task force, Aument oversaw the establishment of a mass-vaccination clinic in his home county of Lancaster at the Park City Center in conjunction with local hospitals and Lancaster county commissioner Joshua Parsons.

Aument is an opponent of abortion rights. He has voted for numerous restrictions on abortion services since the beginning of his time in the Pennsylvania House of Representatives in 2011 to under the end of his career in the Pennsylvania Senate.

Aument is an opponent of LGBT rights. In 2022, he co-sponsored and voted twice in favor of a bill banning transgender girls from participating on female sports teams. Also in 2022, he was the sponsor of the variant of a "Don't Say Gay" bill in the Pennsylvania Senate, which would forbid any discussion of sexual/romantic orientation or of gender identity in Pennsylvania elementary schools.

Aument opposes the use of ballot drop boxes in elections, saying in 2022, "it has become abundantly clear that drop boxes are the least secure way to vote in Pennsylvania."

On December 31, 2024, Aument resigned his Senate seat to become State Director to U.S. Senator Dave McCormick. The seat was filled by special election in March 2025, and was taken by Democrat James Andrew Malone in what was described as a major upset (since the district is reliably Republican).

=== Committee assignments ===
- Consumer Protection & Professional Licensure, Vice Chair
- Appropriations
- Communications & Technology
- Education
- Environmental Resources & Energy
- Judiciary
- Local Government
- Rules & Executive Nominations

== Military career ==
Ryan served as a captain in the United States Army during Operation Iraqi Freedom, briefly commanding an infantry company of 150 soldiers after his company commander was wounded in action. He also served on battalion staff as a Civil Affairs officer. During his military career, Aument earned several awards, including the Bronze Star Medal, Army Commendation Medal, Army Achievement Medal and Army Parachutist Badge. He graduated from The Citadel, the Military College of South Carolina, in 1999.
