= 2002 Pennsylvania Senate election =

- November 5, 2002

All even-numbered seats in the Pennsylvania State Senate 26 seats needed for a majority
	Majority party	Minority party
Leader	Robert Jubelirer	Bob Mellow
Party	Republican	Democratic
Leader's seat	30th district	22nd District
Last election	30	20
Seats before	29	21
Seats won	15	10
Seats after	29	21
Seat change	Steady	Steady
- Results; Democratic hold Republican hold No election

Elections for the Pennsylvania State Senate were held on November 5, 2002, with even-numbered districts being contested. State Senators are elected for four-year terms, with half of the Senate seats up for a vote every two years. The term of office for those elected in 2002 ran from January 3, 2003 until November 28, 2006. Necessary primary elections were held on May 21, 2002.

This was the first Pennsylvania State Senate election held after the constitutionally-mandated decennial reapportionment plan.

None of the seats of the three senators who did not run for re-election changed party hands. Robert C. Wonderling succeeded the retiring Republican senator, Edwin G. Holl. John C. Rafferty, Jr. succeeded Republican Senator James W. Gerlach, who successfully ran for Pennsylvania's 6th congressional district. Jim Ferlo, a veteran member of Pittsburgh's City Council, succeeded the retiring Democratic senator Leonard J. Bodack.

== Predictions ==
Source	Ranking	As of
The Cook; Political Report	Likely R	October 4, 2002

== Overview ==
Affiliation	Members
Republican Party	29
Democratic Party	21
Total	50

== General Elections ==
District	Party	Incumbent	Status	Party	Candidate	Votes	%
2	Democratic	Christine M. Tartaglione	re-elected	Democratic	Christine M. Tartaglione	39,785	79.4
2	Democratic	Christine M. Tartaglione	re-elected	Republican	Gary Adam Feldman	9,787	19.5
2	Democratic	Christine M. Tartaglione	re-elected	Green	Traci Confer	532	1.1
4	Democratic	Allyson Y. Schwartz	re-elected	Democratic	Allyson Y. Schwartz	77,396	82.3
4	Democratic	Allyson Y. Schwartz	re-elected	Republican	Ron Holt	15,231	17.7
6	Republican	Robert M. Tomlinson	re-elected	Republican	Robert M. Tomlinson	42,532	52.6
6	Republican	Robert M. Tomlinson	re-elected	Democratic	Peter H. Kostmayer	38,385	47.4
8	Democratic	Anthony H. Williams	re-elected	Democratic	Anthony H. Williams	46,583	78.9
8	Democratic	Anthony H. Williams	re-elected	Republican	John P. McKelligott	12,460	21.1
10	Republican	Joe Conti	re-elected	Republican	Joe Conti	49,407	61.5
10	Republican	Joe Conti	re-elected	Democratic	Ronald H. Elgart	30,901	38.5
12	Republican	Stewart J. Greenleaf	re-elected	Republican	Stewart J. Greenleaf	56,858	66.8
12	Republican	Stewart J. Greenleaf	re-elected	Democratic	Howard P. Rovner	28,206	33.2
14	Democratic	Raphael J. Musto	re-elected	Democratic	Raphael J. Musto	40,442	100.0
16	Republican	Charles W. Dent	re-elected	Republican	Charles W. Dent	40,320	65.1
16	Republican	Charles W. Dent	re-elected	Democratic	Richard J. Orloski	21,571	34.9
18	Democratic	Lisa Boscola	re-elected	Democratic	Lisa Boscola	39,312	61.7
18	Democratic	Lisa Boscola	re-elected	Republican	Nick Sabatine	24,353	38.3
20	Republican	Charles D. Lemmond, Jr.	re-elected	Republican	Charles D. Lemmond, Jr.	43,467	69.6
20	Republican	Charles D. Lemmond, Jr.	re-elected	Democratic	John Petrizzo	18,998	30.4
22	Democratic	Robert J. Mellow	re-elected	Democratic	Robert J. Mellow	50,274	69.1
22	Democratic	Robert J. Mellow	re-elected	Republican	Frank Scavo	22,451	30.9
24	Republican	Edwin G. Holl	retired	Republican	Robert C. Wonderling	39,464	55.1
24	Republican	Edwin G. Holl	retired	Democratic	Jim Maza	32,215	44.9
26	Republican	Edwin B. Erickson	re-elected	Republican	Edwin B. Erickson	52,908	63.3
26	Republican	Edwin B. Erickson	re-elected	Democratic	Sean Crumlish	30,643	36.7
28	Republican	Mike Waugh	re-elected	Republican	Mike Waugh	46,560	100
30	Republican	Robert C. Jubelirer	re-elected	Republican	Robert C. Jubelirer	47,715	73.1
30	Republican	Robert C. Jubelirer	re-elected	Democratic	Stacey R. Brumbaugh	17,578	26.9
32	Democratic	Richard A. Kasunic	re-elected	Democratic	Richard A. Kasunic	41,686	100.0
34	Republican	Jacob D. Corman III	re-elected	Republican	Jacob D. Corman III	57,472	92.6
34	Republican	Jacob D. Corman III	re-elected	Libertarian	Daniel W. Tuel	4,620	7.4
36	Republican	Noah W. Wenger	re-elected	Republican	Noah W. Wenger	52,158	94.6
36	Republican	Noah W. Wenger	re-elected	Constitution	Laurellynn T. Petolicchio	2,994	5.4
38	Democratic	Leonard J. Bodack	retired	Democratic	Jim Ferlo	38,886	64.9
38	Democratic	Leonard J. Bodack	retired	Constitution	Ted Tomson	21,000	35.1
40	Republican	Jane C. Orie	re-elected	Republican	Jane C. Orie	57,310	70.8
40	Republican	Jane C. Orie	re-elected	Democratic	Dan Demarco	23,642	29.1
42	Democratic	Jack Wagner	re-elected	Democratic	Jack Wagner	44,249	72.3
42	Democratic	Jack Wagner	re-elected	Republican	Thomas Stepnick	16,952	27.7
44	Republican	James W. Gerlach	ran for Congress	Republican	John C. Rafferty, Jr.	42,558	59.2
44	Republican	James W. Gerlach	ran for Congress	Democratic	Rick Jacobs	29,368	40.8
46	Democratic	J. Barry Stout	re-elected	Democratic	J. Barry Stout	58,973	100.0
48	Republican	David J. Brightbill	re-elected	Republican	David J. Brightbill	52,341	69.5
48	Republican	David J. Brightbill	re-elected	Democratic	Ed Arnold	22,952	30.5
50	Republican	Bob Robbins	re-elected	Republican	Bob Robbins	42,728	65.1
50	Republican	Bob Robbins	re-elected	Democratic	Kyle Klaric	22,894	34.9
