= 1994 Pennsylvania Senate election =

- November 8, 1994

25 out of 50 seats in the Pennsylvania State Senate 26 seats needed for a majority

	Majority party	Minority party
Leader	Robert Jubelirer	Bob Mellow
Party	Republican	Democratic
Leader since	March 15, 1994	January 3, 1989
Leader's seat	District 30	District 22
Last election	26	24
Seats after	29	21
Seat change	▲3	▼3
President pro tempore before election
Robert Jubelirer
Republican
Elected President pro tempore
Robert Jubelirer
Republican

The 1994 Pennsylvania Senate election was held on November 8, 1994, to determine which party would control the Pennsylvania State Senate for the following two years in the 1995-1996 Pennsylvania legislature. The 25 even-numbered seats out of 50 seats in the Pennsylvania State Senate were up for election. Prior to the election, 26 seats were held by Republicans and 24 seats were held by Democrats. The general election saw Republicans expanding their majority in the State Senate by 3 seats.

== Results ==
District	Incumbent	Party	Elected Senator	Party	Result
2nd	Bruce Marks	Rep	Christine Tartaglione	Dem	Democratic gain
4th	Allyson Schwartz	Dem	Allyson Schwartz	Dem	Democratic hold
6th	H. Craig Lewis	Dem	Tommy Tomlinson	Rep	Republican gain
8th	Hardy Williams	Dem	Hardy Williams	Dem	Democratic hold
10th	David Heckler	Rep	David Heckler	Rep	Republican hold
12th	Stewart Greenleaf	Rep	Stewart Greenleaf	Rep	Republican hold
14th	Ray Musto	Dem	Ray Musto	Dem	Democratic hold
16th	Roy Afflerbach	Dem	Roy Afflerbach	Dem	Democratic hold
18th	Jeanette Reibman	Dem	Joseph Uliana	Rep	Republican gain
20th	Charles Lemmond	Rep	Charles Lemmond	Rep	Republican hold
22nd	Bob Mellow	Dem	Bob Mellow	Dem	Democratic hold
24th	Edwin Holl	Rep	Edwin Holl	Rep	Republican hold
26th	F. Joseph Loeper	Rep	F. Joseph Loeper	Rep	Republican hold
28th	Michael Bortner	Dem	Dan Delp	Rep	Republican gain
30th	Robert Jubelirer	Rep	Robert Jubelirer	Rep	Republican hold
32nd	J. William Lincoln	Dem	Rich Kasunic	Dem	Democratic hold
34th	Doyle Corman	Rep	Doyle Corman	Rep	Republican hold
36th	Noah Wenger	Rep	Noah Wenger	Rep	Republican hold
38th	Leonard Bodack	Dem	Leonard Bodack	Dem	Democratic hold
40th	Melissa Hart	Rep	Melissa Hart	Rep	Republican hold
42nd	Jack Wagner	Dem	Jack Wagner	Dem	Democratic hold
44th	Frank Pecora	Dem	Jim Gerlach	Rep	Republican gain
46th	Barry Stout	Dem	Barry Stout	Dem	Democratic hold
48th	David J. Brightbill	Rep	David J. Brightbill	Rep	Republican hold
50th	Robert D. Robbins	Rep	Robert D. Robbins	Rep	Republican hold
