= 2006 Pennsylvania Senate election =

- November 7, 2006

All even-numbered seats in the Pennsylvania State Senate 26 seats needed for a majority
	Majority party	Minority party
Leader	Robert Jubelirer	Bob Mellow
Party	Republican	Democratic
Leader's seat	30th district	22nd District
Last election	30	20
Seats before	29	21
Seats won	15	10
Seats after	29	21
Seat change	Steady	Steady
- Results; Democratic hold Republican hold No election

The 2006 Elections for the Pennsylvania State Senate were held on November 7, 2006, with even-numbered districts being contested. Necessary primary elections were held on May 16, 2006. State Senators are elected for four-year terms, with half of the Senate seats up for a vote every two years. Members elected in 2006 were inaugurated on January 2, 2007.

The Senate elections saw no seats change parties, with the Republicans holding onto an eight-seat majority. Senate Republican floor leader, David J. Brightbill, was defeated for in the primary election by tire salesman Mike Folmer. President pro tempore Robert C. Jubelirer was defeated for re-election by fellow Republican and Blair County commissioner John Eichelberger. Three Republican senators, Joe Conti, Charles D. Lemmond Jr., Noah W. Wenger, retired and were succeeded by Chuck McIlhinney, Lisa Baker, and Michael W. Brubaker, respectively.

== Predictions ==
Source	Ranking	As of
Rothenberg	Likely R	November 4, 2006

== Overview ==
Affiliation	Members
Republican Party	29
Democratic Party	21
Total	50

== General election ==
District	Party	Incumbent	Status	Party	Candidate	Votes	%
2	Democratic	Christine M. Tartaglione	re-elected	Democratic	Christine M. Tartaglione	44,066	84.2
2	Democratic	Christine M. Tartaglione	re-elected	Republican	Christopher Morris	8,283	15.8
4	Democratic	Leanna M. Washington	re-elected	Democratic	Leanna M. Washington	77,396	84.2
4	Democratic	Leanna M. Washington	re-elected	Republican	Ron Holt	41,685	46.6
6	Republican	Robert M. Tomlinson	re-elected	Republican	Robert M. Tomlinson	47,772	53.4
6	Republican	Robert M. Tomlinson	re-elected	Democratic	Paul Lang	41,685	46.6
8	Democratic	Anthony H. Williams	re-elected	Democratic	Anthony H. Williams	58,053	100.0
10	Republican	Joe Conti	retired	Republican	Chuck McIlhinney	52,060	51.5
10	Republican	Joe Conti	retired	Democratic	Chris Serpico	48,951	48.5
12	Republican	Stewart J. Greenleaf	re-elected	Republican	Stewart J. Greenleaf	56,935	57.4
12	Republican	Stewart J. Greenleaf	re-elected	Democratic	Jeff Albert	42,257	42.6
14	Democratic	Raphael J. Musto	re-elected	Democratic	Raphael J. Musto	53,087	100.0
16	Republican	Pat Browne	re-elected	Republican	Pat Browne	38,764	54.2
16	Republican	Pat Browne	re-elected	Democratic	Richard J. Orloski	32788	45.8
18	Democratic	Lisa Boscola	re-elected	Democratic	Lisa Boscola	51,599	71.4
18	Democratic	Lisa Boscola	re-elected	Republican	Bonnie L. Dodge	20,714	28.6
20	Republican	Charles D. Lemmond Jr.	retired	Republican	Lisa Baker	46,943	59.4
20	Republican	Charles D. Lemmond Jr.	retired	Democratic	Robert G. McNamara	32,148	40.6
22	Democratic	Robert J. Mellow	re-elected	Democratic	Robert J. Mellow	71,141	100.0
24	Republican	Robert C. Wonderling	re-elected	Republican	Robert C. Wonderling	48,310	56.5
24	Republican	Robert C. Wonderling	re-elected	Democratic	Dave Wilsey	37,179	43.5
26	Republican	Edwin B. Erickson	re-elected	Republican	Edwin B. Erickson	50,986	52.2
26	Republican	Edwin B. Erickson	re-elected	Democratic	Michael T. Farrell	46641	47.8
28	Republican	Mike Waugh	re-elected	Republican	Mike Waugh	52,442	66.3
28	Republican	Mike Waugh	re-elected	Democratic	J. P. Kurish	24,050	30.4
28	Republican	Mike Waugh	re-elected	Green	Edward W.Gately Sr.	2,637	3.3
30	Republican	Robert C. Jubelirer	defeated for re-nomination	Republican	John H. Eichelberger Jr.	45,607	62.7
30	Republican	Robert C. Jubelirer	defeated for re-nomination	Democratic	Greg Morris	27,106	37.3
32	Democratic	Richard A. Kasunic	re-elected	Democratic	Richard A. Kasunic	45,425	68.1
32	Democratic	Richard A. Kasunic	re-elected	Republican	Ronald L. Gallo	21,302	31.9
34	Republican	Jacob D. Corman III	re-elected	Republican	Jacob D. Corman III	43,028	56.0
34	Republican	Jacob D. Corman III	re-elected	Democratic	John Eich	30,025	39.1
34	Republican	Jacob D. Corman III	re-elected	Libertarian	Thomas A. Martin	2,140	2.8
34	Republican	Jacob D. Corman III	re-elected	Independent	Robert J. Cash	1,590	2.1
36	Republican	Noah W. Wenger	retired	Republican	Michael W. Brubaker	51,145	65.5
36	Republican	Noah W. Wenger	retired	Democratic	Jason A. Leisey	26,896	34.5
38	Democratic	Jim Ferlo	re-elected	Democratic	Jim Ferlo	57,195	84.2
38	Democratic	Jim Ferlo	re-elected	Constitution	Joseph Murphy	10,718	15.8
40	Republican	Jane C. Orie	re-elected	Republican	Jane C. Orie	77,566	84.7
40	Republican	Jane C. Orie	re-elected	Constitution	Christopher M. Graham	14,029	15.3
42	Democratic	Wayne Fontana	re-elected	Democratic	Wayne Fontana	60,634	100.0
44	Republican	John C. Rafferty Jr.	re-elected	Republican	John C. Rafferty Jr.	49,798	56.2
44	Republican	John C. Rafferty Jr.	re-elected	Democratic	Dan Weand	38,768	43.8
46	Democratic	J. Barry Stout	re-elected	Democratic	J. Barry Stout	61,511	100.0
48	Republican	David J. Brightbill	defeated for re-nomination	Republican	Mike Folmer	54,425	63.4
48	Republican	David J. Brightbill	defeated for re-nomination	Democratic	John R. Liss	31,442	36.6
50	Republican	Bob Robbins	re-elected	Republican	Bob Robbins	41,302	53.5
50	Republican	Bob Robbins	re-elected	Democratic	Art Allen	35,854	46.5

== See also ==
- Pennsylvania State Senate
- Pennsylvania House of Representatives elections, 2006
