= 2018 Pennsylvania Senate election =

- November 6, 2018

All even-numbered seats in the Pennsylvania State Senate 26 seats needed for a majority
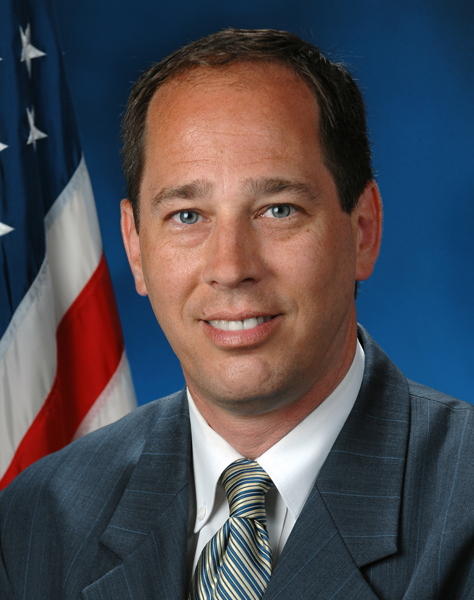

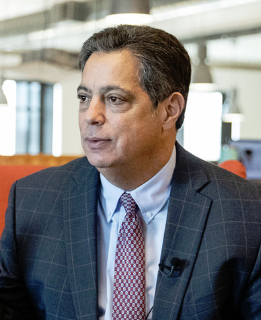
	Majority party	Minority party
Leader	Joe Scarnati	Jay Costa
Party	Republican	Democratic
Leader since	December 2006	January 4, 2011
Leader's seat	25th	43rd
Last election	34	16
Seats won	13	12
Seats after	29	21
Seat change	▼5	▲5
Popular vote	1,096,954	1,297,494
Percentage	45.51%	53.83%
- Results; Democratic hold Democratic gain Republican hold No election
President Pro Tempore before election
Joe Scarnati
Republican
Elected President Pro Tempore
Joe Scarnati
Republican

The 2018 elections for the Pennsylvania State Senate were held on November 6, 2018, with 25 of 50 districts being contested. Primary elections were held on May 15, 2018. The term of office for those elected in 2018 began when the Senate convened in January 2019. Pennsylvania state senators are elected for four-year terms, with half of the seats up for election every two years.

Republicans had controlled the chamber since the 1994 election (24 years).

== Overview ==
Republicans had controlled the chamber for 24 years (since the 1994 election). Democrats won five seats but failed to retake the majority despite winning the popular vote by over 200,000 votes. However, in five contests a Democrat ran unopposed with no Republicans appearing on the ballot. Republican senator Randy Vulakovich of the 38th district was the only incumbent to be defeated in the primary elections, losing to Jeremy Shaffer, who in turn lost to Democratic candidate Lindsey Williams in the general election. Two other Republican incumbents – Thomas J. McGarrigle and John Rafferty Jr. – were also defeated in the general election by their Democratic challengers (Timothy P. Kearney and Katie Muth, respectively). In the 10th district, Republican Chuck McIlhinney chose to retire, and his seat was won by Democrat Steve Santarsiero, while in the 12th district, Republican Stewart Greenleaf retired and was replaced by Democrat Maria Collett.

Affiliation	Candidates	Votes	Vote %	Seats won	Seats after
Republican	20	1,096,954	45.51%	13 (▼5)	29
Democratic	24	1,297,494	53.83%	12 (▲5)	21
Green	1	14,467	0.60%	0	0
Libertarian	1	1,251	0.05%	0	0
Total	46	2,410,166	100%	25	50

Popular vote for 25 Senate seats
Democratic	53.83%
Republican	45.51%
Other	0.65%

Percentage of 25 Senate seats won
Republican	52%
Democratic	48%

== Close races ==
Ten district races had winning margins of less than 15%:

District	Winner	Margin
District 6	Republican	0.06%
District 10	Democratic (flip)	5.06%
District 12	Democratic (flip)	5.38%
District 16	Republican	2.84%
District 24	Republican	5.82%
District 26	Democratic (flip)	8.58%
District 34	Republican	11.52%
District 38	Democratic (flip)	0.64%
District 40	Republican	12.59%
District 44	Democratic (flip)	3.94%

== Predictions ==
Source	Ranking	As of
Governing	Likely R	October 8, 2018

== Controversy ==
Democrat Lindsey Williams defeated Republican Jeremy Shaffer in the 38th District, a seat previously held by Republican Randy Vulakovich. After the election, Senate Republicans questioned whether Williams met the State-Constitutional requirement to be a "citizen and inhabitant" of Pennsylvania for four years prior to the election, as she claimed to have moved to Pennsylvania exactly four years prior to her election. After weeks of speculation and rumors of the GOP majority planning to refuse to seat her, Senate Majority Leader Joe Scarnati announced that he would recommend that she be seated. This announcement came after Williams provided proof that she had accepted a job in Pennsylvania on November 2, 2014. Ultimately, Williams was sworn in with the rest of the senators without any objection.

== Results ==
District	Party	Incumbent	Status	Party	Candidate	Votes	%
2	Democratic	Christine Tartaglione	Re-elected	Democratic	Christine Tartaglione	58,717	100.00
4	Democratic	Arthur L. Haywood III	Re-elected	Democratic	Arthur L. Haywood III	110,114	86.58
4	Democratic	Arthur L. Haywood III	Re-elected	Republican	Ronald F. Holt	17,068	13.42
6	Republican	Robert M. Tomlinson	Re-elected	Republican	Robert M. Tomlinson	54,382	50.03
6	Republican	Robert M. Tomlinson	Re-elected	Democratic	Tina Davis	54,308	49.97
8	Democratic	Anthony H. Williams	Re-elected	Democratic	Anthony H. Williams	86,092	100.00
10	Republican	Chuck McIlhinney	Retired	Democratic	Steve Santarsiero	67,438	52.53
10	Republican	Chuck McIlhinney	Retired	Republican	Marguerite Quinn	60,935	47.47
12	Republican	Stewart Greenleaf	Retired	Democratic	Maria Collett	62,069	52.69
12	Republican	Stewart Greenleaf	Retired	Republican	Stewart Greenleaf Jr.	55,742	47.31
14	Democratic	John Yudichak	Re-elected	Democratic	John Yudichak	51,521	100.00
16	Republican	Pat Browne	Re-elected	Republican	Pat Browne	48,897	51.42
16	Republican	Pat Browne	Re-elected	Democratic	Mark Pinsley	48,200	48.58
18	Democratic	Lisa Boscola	Re-elected	Democratic	Lisa Boscola	65,705	100.00
20	Republican	Lisa Baker	Re-elected	Republican	Lisa Baker	67,350	82.32
20	Republican	Lisa Baker	Re-elected	Green	John Sweeney	14,467	17.68
22	Democratic	John Blake	Re-elected	Democratic	John Blake	59,249	61.33
22	Democratic	John Blake	Re-elected	Republican	Frank Scavo III	37,367	38.67
24	Republican	Bob Mensch	Re-elected	Republican	Bob Mensch	54,586	52.41
24	Republican	Bob Mensch	Re-elected	Democratic	Linda Fields	49,558	47.59
26	Republican	Thomas J. McGarrigle	Defeated	Democratic	Timothy Kearney	65,660	54.29
26	Republican	Thomas J. McGarrigle	Defeated	Republican	Thomas J. McGarrigle	55,287	45.71
28	Republican	Scott Wagner	Ran for Governor	Republican	Kristin Phillips-Hill	62,380	62.70
28	Republican	Scott Wagner	Ran for Governor	Democratic	Judith McCormick-Higgins	37,105	37.30
30	Republican	John Eichelberger	Ran for U.S. House	Republican	Judy Ward	63,661	72.87
30	Republican	John Eichelberger	Ran for U.S. House	Democratic	Emily Garbuny Best	23,684	27.13
32	Republican	Patrick J. Stefano	Re-elected	Republican	Patrick J. Stefano	54,417	65.73
32	Republican	Patrick J. Stefano	Re-elected	Democratic	Pamela Gerard	28,371	34.27
34	Republican	Jake Corman	Re-elected	Republican	Jake Corman	49,259	55.76
34	Republican	Jake Corman	Re-elected	Democratic	Ezra Nanes	39,075	44.24
36	Republican	Ryan P. Aument	Re-elected	Republican	Ryan P. Aument	69,851	66.44
36	Republican	Ryan P. Aument	Re-elected	Democratic	William Troutman Jr.	35,280	33.56
38	Republican	Randy Vulakovich	Lost Primary	Democratic	Lindsey Williams	62,361	50.32
38	Republican	Randy Vulakovich	Lost Primary	Republican	Jeremy Shaffer	61,568	49.68
40	Republican	Mario Scavello	Re-elected	Republican	Mario Scavello	54,783	55.66
40	Republican	Mario Scavello	Re-elected	Democratic	Tarah Probst	42,396	43.07
40	Republican	Mario Scavello	Re-elected	Libertarian	Adam Reinhardt	1,251	1.27
42	Democratic	Wayne D. Fontana	Re-elected	Democratic	Wayne D. Fontana	86,288	100.00
44	Republican	John Rafferty, Jr.	Defeated	Democratic	Katie Muth	62,692	51.97
44	Republican	John Rafferty, Jr.	Defeated	Republican	John Rafferty, Jr.	57,943	48.03
46	Republican	Camera C. Bartolotta	Re-elected	Republican	Camera C. Bartolotta	55,527	58.80
46	Republican	Camera C. Bartolotta	Re-elected	Democratic	James R. Craig	38,908	41.20
48	Republican	Mike Folmer	Re-elected	Republican	Mike Folmer	60,357	62.94
48	Republican	Mike Folmer	Re-elected	Democratic	Lois Herr	35,545	37.06
50	Republican	Michele Brooks	Re-elected	Republican	Michele Brooks	55,648	65.64
50	Republican	Michele Brooks	Re-elected	Democratic	Sue Ann Mulvey	29,125	34.36

Source: Pennsylvania Department of State
