= 2010 Pennsylvania Senate election =

- November 2, 2010

All even-numbered seats in the Pennsylvania State Senate 26 seats needed for a majority
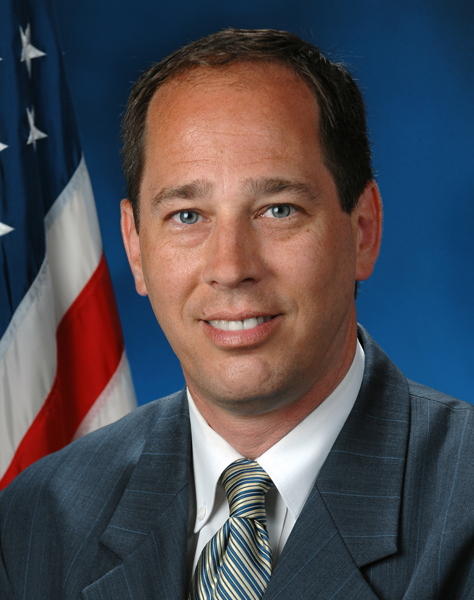

	Majority party	Minority party
Leader	Joe Scarnati	Bob Mellow
Party	Republican	Democratic
Leader's seat	25th district	22nd District
Last election	30	20
Seats won	15	10
Seats after	30	20
Seat change	Steady	Steady
- Results; Democratic hold Republican hold No election

The 2010 elections for the State Senate in the U.S. state of Pennsylvania were held on November 2, 2010, with the even-numbered districts contested. Necessary primary elections were held on May 18, 2010. The term of office for those elected in 2010 run from January 4, 2011 until November 30, 2014. State Senators are elected for four year terms, with half of the seats in the Senate up for election every two years.

== Overview ==
Affiliation	Members
Democratic	20
Republican	30
Total	50

== Predictions ==
Source	Ranking	As of
Governing	Safe R	November 1, 2010

== General election ==
District	Party	Incumbent	Status	Party	Candidate	Votes	%
2	Democratic	Christine Tartaglione	Re-elected	Democratic	Christine Tartaglione	37,417	81.8
2	Democratic	Christine Tartaglione	Re-elected	Republican	Gary Adam Feldman	8,310	18.2
4	Democratic	LeAnna Washington	Re-elected	Democratic	LeAnna Washington	83,110	100.0
6	Republican	Tommy Tomlinson	Re-elected	Republican	Tommy Tomlinson	48,419	58.4
6	Republican	Tommy Tomlinson	Re-elected	Democratic	Bryan Allen	34,536	41.6
8	Democratic	Anthony H. Williams	Re-elected	Democratic	Anthony H. Williams	62,195	86.0
8	Democratic	Anthony H. Williams	Re-elected	Republican	Rhashea Harmon	10,128	14.0
10	Republican	Chuck McIlhinney	Re-elected	Republican	Chuck McIlhinney	57,349	59.8
10	Republican	Chuck McIlhinney	Re-elected	Democratic	Cynthia M. Philo	38,509	40.2
12	Republican	Stewart Greenleaf	Re-elected	Republican	Stewart Greenleaf	61,802	64.0
12	Republican	Stewart Greenleaf	Re-elected	Democratic	Ruth S. Damsker	34,745	36.0
14	Democratic	Ray Musto	Retired	Democratic	John Yudichak	37,047	55.9
14	Democratic	Ray Musto	Retired	Republican	Stephen Urban	25,604	38.6
14	Democratic	Ray Musto	Retired	Libertarian	Betsy Summers	3,685	5.6
16	Republican	Pat Browne	Re-elected	Republican	Pat Browne	46,076	61.5
16	Republican	Pat Browne	Re-elected	Democratic	Richard J. Orloski	28,883	38.5
18	Democratic	Lisa Boscola	Re-elected	Democratic	Lisa Boscola	44,503'	60.9
18	Democratic	Lisa Boscola	Re-elected	Republican	Matt Connolly	28,503	39.1
20	Republican	Lisa Baker	Re-elected	Republican	Lisa Baker	62,391	100.0
22	Democratic	Bob Mellow	Retired	Democratic	John Blake	49,047	62.7
22	Democratic	Bob Mellow	Retired	Republican	Frank Scavo	29,128	37.3
24	Republican	Bob Mensch	Re-elected	Republican	Bob Mensch	51,911	60.3
24	Republican	Bob Mensch	Re-elected	Democratic	Bill Wallace	34,220	39.7
26	Republican	Edwin Erickson	Re-elected	Republican	Edwin Erickson	52,932	58.4
26	Republican	Edwin Erickson	Re-elected	Democratic	Michael T. Farrell	37,773	41.6
28	Republican	Mike Waugh	Re-elected	Republican	Mike Waugh	61,803	84.3
28	Republican	Mike Waugh	Re-elected	Libertarian	Edward W. Gately, Sr.	11,479	15.7
30	Republican	John Eichelberger	Re-elected	Republican	John Eichelberger	66,197	100.0
32	Democratic	Rich Kasunic	Re-elected	Democratic	Rich Kasunic	57,570	100.0
34	Republican	Jake Corman	Re-elected	Republican	Jake Corman	52,858	69.2
34	Republican	Jake Corman	Re-elected	Democratic	Jon Eich	23,481	30.8
36	Republican	Mike Brubaker	Re-elected	Republican	Mike Brubaker	65,153	100.0
38	Democratic	Jim Ferlo	Re-elected	Democratic	Jim Ferlo	53,595'	100.0
40	Republican	Jane Orie	Re-elected	Republican	Jane Orie	51,578	57.9
40	Republican	Jane Orie	Re-elected	Democratic	Dan DeMarco	41,959	42.2
42	Democratic	Wayne Fontana	Re-elected	Democratic	Wayne Fontana	50,994	100.0
44	Republican	John Rafferty, Jr.	Re-elected	Republican	John Rafferty, Jr.	55,418	62.1
44	Republican	John Rafferty, Jr.	Re-elected	Democratic	Matt Stehman	33,802	37.9
46	Democratic	Barry Stout	Retired	Democratic	Tim Solobay	39,530	53.3
46	Democratic	Barry Stout	Retired	Republican	Kris Vanderman	34,597	46.7
48	Republican	Mike Folmer	Re-elected	Republican	Mike Folmer	61,850	72.3
48	Republican	Mike Folmer	Re-elected	Democratic	Jo Ellen Litz	23,565	27.7
50	Republican	Robert D. Robbins	Re-elected	Republican	Robert D. Robbins	57,350	81.8
50	Republican	Robert D. Robbins	Re-elected	Independent	Roberta Biros	12,725	18.2
