= 2014 Pennsylvania Senate election =

- November 4, 2014

All even-numbered seats in the Pennsylvania State Senate 26 seats needed for a majority
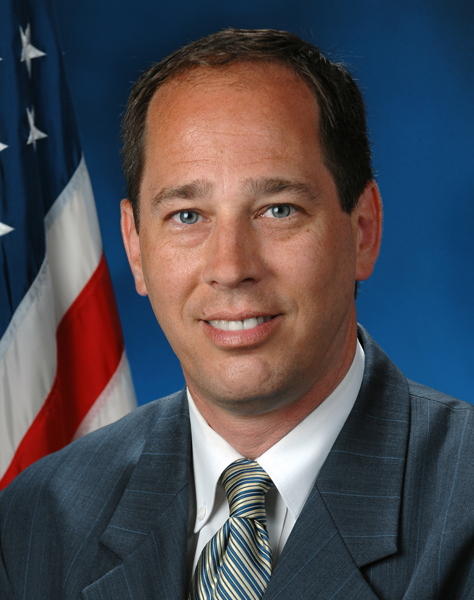

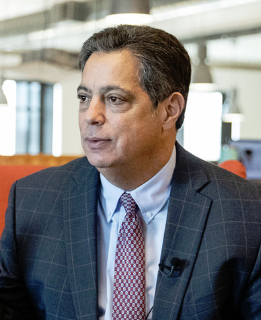
	Majority party	Minority party
Leader	Joe Scarnati	Jay Costa
Party	Republican	Democratic
Leader since	January 2, 2007	January 4, 2011
Leader's seat	25th	43rd
Last election	27	23
Seats won	18	7
Seats after	30	20
Seat change	▲3	▼3
Popular vote	883,122	735,709
Percentage	54.51%	45.41%
- Results; Democratic hold Republican hold Republican gain No election
President Pro Tempore before election
Joe Scarnati
Republican
President Pro Tempore
Joe Scarnati
Republican

The 2014 elections for the Pennsylvania State Senate were held on November 4, 2014, with all even-numbered districts being contested. Primary elections were held on May 20, 2014.

The term of office for those elected in 2014 began when the Senate convened in January 2015. Pennsylvania State Senators are elected to four-year terms, with 25 of the 50 seats contested every two years. Republicans have controlled the chamber since the 1994 election (20 years), but Democrats have competed to retake the majority. A net Democratic gain of two seats, combined with a win for their ticket of Tom Wolf and Michael J. Stack III in the 2014 gubernatorial election would have seen Stack become Lieutenant Governor of Pennsylvania and thus cast the tie-breaking vote to give Democrats the majority. Democrats hoped the unpopularity of Governor Tom Corbett would help in their efforts. Instead, the Republicans gained three seats from the Democrats to expand their majority.

Democratic senator LeAnna Washington of the 4th District was the only incumbent to be defeated in the primary elections. She lost to attorney Art Haywood, shortly after she was charged with diversion of services and conflict of interest for illegally using her legislative staff for campaign purposes. She received 13,708 votes (33.82%) to Haywood's 16,113 (39.75%). Brian Gralnick, the director of the Center for Social Responsibility at the Jewish Federation of Greater Philadelphia, took 10,711 votes (26.43%).

These were the first elections held under new maps drawn using data from the 2010 census. Maps intended for use in the 2012 elections were struck down by the Supreme Court of Pennsylvania due to splitting too many counties and municipalities unnecessarily. The court later allowed a new set of maps drawn by Republicans to pass despite accusations of partisan gerrymandering from Democrats, but they were not passed in time to be used for the 2012 elections.

== Results overview ==
Affiliation	Candidates	Votes	Vote %	Seats Won	Seats After
Republican	21	883,122	54.51%	18 (▲3)	30
Democratic	20	735,709	45.41%	7 (▼3)	20
Independent	1	1,355	0.08%	0	0
Total	42	1,620,186	100%	25	50

== Predictions ==
Source	Ranking	As of
Governing	Likely R	October 20, 2014

=== Polling ===
District 10

Poll source	Date(s) administered	Sample size	Margin of error	Chuck McIlhinney (R)	Steve Cickay (D)	Other	Undecided
Thirty-Ninth Street	July 22–25, 2014	400	± ?	56%	32%	—	12%

District 40

Poll source	Date(s) administered	Sample size	Margin of error	Mario Scavello (R)	Mark Aurand (D)	Other	Undecided
Harper Polling	September 21–22, 2014	754	± 3.57%	51%	34%	—	15%

== Special election ==
A special election was held on March 18, 2014, to fill the vacancy created by the resignation of Mike Waugh in January 2014.

District	Party	Incumbent	Status	Party	Candidate	Votes	%
28	Republican	Mike Waugh	Resigned	Write-In	Scott Wagner	10,654	47.51
28	Republican	Mike Waugh	Resigned	Republican	Ron Miller	5,951	26.54
28	Republican	Mike Waugh	Resigned	Democratic	Linda E. Small	5,744	25.61

== General election ==
District	Party	Incumbent	Status	Party	Candidate	Votes	%
2	Democratic	Christine Tartaglione	Re-elected	Democratic	Christine Tartaglione	35,405	78.91
2	Democratic	Christine Tartaglione	Re-elected	Republican	John J. Jenkins III	9,464	21.09
4	Democratic	LeAnna Washington	Lost primary	Democratic	Arthur L. Haywood III	78,001	81.37
4	Democratic	LeAnna Washington	Lost primary	Republican	Robin Matthew Gilchrist	16,498	17.21
4	Democratic	LeAnna Washington	Lost primary	Independent	Ines Reyes	1,355	1.41
6	Republican	Robert M. Tomlinson	Re-elected	Republican	Robert M. Tomlinson	45,361	61.84
6	Republican	Robert M. Tomlinson	Re-elected	Democratic	Kimberly Yeager-Rose	27,997	38.16
8	Democratic	Anthony H. Williams	Re-elected	Democratic	Anthony H. Williams	58,547	100.00
10	Republican	Chuck McIlhinney	Re-elected	Republican	Chuck McIlhinney	49,605	58.65
10	Republican	Chuck McIlhinney	Re-elected	Democratic	Stephen George Cickay, Jr.	34,967	41.35
12	Republican	Stewart Greenleaf	Re-elected	Republican	Stewart Greenleaf	50,319	63.34
12	Republican	Stewart Greenleaf	Re-elected	Democratic	Ruth S. Damsker	29,123	36.66
14	Democratic	John Yudichak	Re-elected	Democratic	John Yudichak	41,980	100.00
16	Republican	Pat Browne	Re-elected	Republican	Pat Browne	36,745	62.39
16	Republican	Pat Browne	Re-elected	Democratic	Walter Felton, Jr.	22,146	37.61
18	Democratic	Lisa Boscola	Re-elected	Democratic	Lisa Boscola	54,943	100.00
20	Republican	Lisa Baker	Re-elected	Republican	Lisa Baker	51,946	100.00
22	Democratic	John Blake	Re-elected	Democratic	John Blake	45,716	68.31
22	Democratic	John Blake	Re-elected	Republican	Arthur Joseph Albert	21,213	31.69
24	Republican	Bob Mensch	Re-elected	Republican	Bob Mensch	41,885	59.90
24	Republican	Bob Mensch	Re-elected	Democratic	Jack Hansen	28,041	40.10
26	Republican	Edwin Erickson	Retired	Republican	Thomas J. McGarrigle	45,910	52.12
26	Republican	Edwin Erickson	Retired	Democratic	John I. Kane	42,170	47.88
28	Republican	Scott Wagner	Re-elected	Republican	Scott Wagner	46,247	64.72
28	Republican	Scott Wagner	Re-elected	Democratic	Linda E. Small	25,205	35.28
30	Republican	John Eichelberger	Re-elected	Republican	John Eichelberger	52,042	100.00
32	Democratic	Rich Kasunic	Retired	Republican	Patrick J. Stefano	36,670	57.21
32	Democratic	Rich Kasunic	Retired	Democratic	Deberah L. Kula	27,428	42.79
34	Republican	Jake Corman	Re-elected	Republican	Jake Corman	46,391	100.00
36	Republican	Mike Brubaker	Retired	Republican	Ryan P. Aument	54,058	72.32
36	Republican	Mike Brubaker	Retired	Democratic	Gary J. Schrekengost	20,686	27.68
38	Democratic	Jim Ferlo	District moved	Republican	Randy Vulakovich	58,599	100.00
40	Republican	Randy Vulakovich	District moved	Republican	Mario Scavello	38,417	59.88
40	Republican	Randy Vulakovich	District moved	Democratic	Mark D. Aurand	25,739	40.12
42	Democratic	Wayne D. Fontana	Re-elected	Democratic	Wayne D. Fontana	53,080	100.00
44	Republican	John Rafferty, Jr.	Re-elected	Republican	John Rafferty, Jr.	48,655	61.39
44	Republican	John Rafferty, Jr.	Re-elected	Democratic	Kathi Cozzone	30,597	38.61
46	Democratic	Tim Solobay	Defeated	Republican	Camera C. Bartolotta	36,697	53.23
46	Democratic	Tim Solobay	Defeated	Democratic	Tim Solobay	32,237	46.77
48	Republican	Mike Folmer	Re-elected	Republican	Mike Folmer	54,900	100.00
50	Republican	Robert D. Robbins	Retired	Republican	Michele Brooks	41,500	65.66
50	Republican	Robert D. Robbins	Retired	Democratic	Michael T. Muha	21,701	34.34

Source: Pennsylvania Department of State
