= List of Pennsylvania state legislatures =

The Pennsylvania General Assembly, the legislature of the U.S. state of Pennsylvania, has convened many times since statehood became effective on December 12, 1787. In earlier colonial times (1682–1776) the legislature was known as the Pennsylvania Provincial Assembly.

== Legislatures ==
Name	Start date	End date	Last election
Pennsylvania Constitution of 1776
1776-1777 Pennsylvania legislature	1776		
1777-1778 Pennsylvania legislature	1777		
1778-1779 Pennsylvania legislature	1778		
1779-1780 Pennsylvania legislature	1779		
1780-1781 Pennsylvania legislature	1780		
1781-1782 Pennsylvania legislature	1781		
1782-1783 Pennsylvania legislature	1782		
1783-1784 Pennsylvania legislature	1783		
1784-1785 Pennsylvania legislature	1784		
1785-1786 Pennsylvania legislature	1785		
1786-1787 Pennsylvania legislature	October 25, 1786	September 28, 1787	
1787-1788 Pennsylvania legislature	October 22, 1787	October 4, 1788	October 1787
1788-1789 Pennsylvania legislature	1788		
1789-1790 Pennsylvania legislature	1789		
Pennsylvania Constitution of 1790
1790-1791 Pennsylvania legislature	December 7, 1790	September 30, 1791	October 1790
1791-1792 Pennsylvania legislature	December 6, 1791		
1792-1793 Pennsylvania legislature	1792		
1793-1794 Pennsylvania legislature	1793		
1794-1795 Pennsylvania legislature	1794		
1795-1796 Pennsylvania legislature	1795		
1796-1797 Pennsylvania legislature	1796		
1797-1798 Pennsylvania legislature	1797		
1798-1799 Pennsylvania legislature	1798		
1799-1800 Pennsylvania legislature	1799		
1800-1801 Pennsylvania legislature	1800		
1801-1802 Pennsylvania legislature	1801		
1802-1803 Pennsylvania legislature	1802		
1803-1804 Pennsylvania legislature	1803		
1804-1805 Pennsylvania legislature	1804		
1805-1806 Pennsylvania legislature	1805		
1806-1807 Pennsylvania legislature	1806		
1807-1808 Pennsylvania legislature	1807		
1808-1809 Pennsylvania legislature	1808		
1809-1810 Pennsylvania legislature	1809		
1810-1811 Pennsylvania legislature	1810		
1811-1812 Pennsylvania legislature	1811		
1812-1813 Pennsylvania legislature	1812		
1813-1814 Pennsylvania legislature	1813		
1814-1815 Pennsylvania legislature	1814		
1815-1816 Pennsylvania legislature	1815		
1816-1817 Pennsylvania legislature	1816		
1817-1818 Pennsylvania legislature	1817		
1818-1819 Pennsylvania legislature	1818		
1819-1820 Pennsylvania legislature	1819		
1820-1821 Pennsylvania legislature	1820		
1821-1822 Pennsylvania legislature	1821		
1822-1823 Pennsylvania legislature	1822		
1823-1824 Pennsylvania legislature	1823		
1824-1825 Pennsylvania legislature	1824		
1825-1826 Pennsylvania legislature	1825		
1826-1827 Pennsylvania legislature	1826		
1827-1828 Pennsylvania legislature	1827		
1828-1829 Pennsylvania legislature	1828		
1829-1830 Pennsylvania legislature	1829		
1830-1831 Pennsylvania legislature	1830		
1831-1832 Pennsylvania legislature	1831		
1832-1833 Pennsylvania legislature	1832		
1833-1834 Pennsylvania legislature	1833		
1834-1835 Pennsylvania legislature	1834		
Pennsylvania Constitution of 1838
1835-1836 Pennsylvania legislature	1835		
1836-1837 Pennsylvania legislature	1836		
1837-1838 Pennsylvania legislature	1837		
1838-1839 Pennsylvania legislature	1838		
1840 Pennsylvania legislature	1840		
1841 Pennsylvania legislature	1841		
1842 Pennsylvania legislature	1842		
1843 Pennsylvania legislature	1843		
1844 Pennsylvania legislature	1844		
1845 Pennsylvania legislature	1845		
1846 Pennsylvania legislature	1846		
1847 Pennsylvania legislature	1847		
1848 Pennsylvania legislature	1848		
1849 Pennsylvania legislature	1849		
1850 Pennsylvania legislature	1850		
1851 Pennsylvania legislature	1851		
1852 Pennsylvania legislature	1852		
1853 Pennsylvania legislature	1853		
1854 Pennsylvania legislature	1854		
1855 Pennsylvania legislature	1855		
1856 Pennsylvania legislature	1856		
1857 Pennsylvania legislature	1857		
1858 Pennsylvania legislature	1858		
1859 Pennsylvania legislature	1859		
1860 Pennsylvania legislature	1860		
1861 Pennsylvania legislature	1861		
1862 Pennsylvania legislature	1862		
1863 Pennsylvania legislature	1863		
1864 Pennsylvania legislature	1864		
1865 Pennsylvania legislature	1865		
1866 Pennsylvania legislature	1866		
1867 Pennsylvania legislature	1867		
1868 Pennsylvania legislature	1868		
1869 Pennsylvania legislature	1869		
1870 Pennsylvania legislature	1870		
1871 Pennsylvania legislature	1871		
1872 Pennsylvania legislature	1872		
1873 Pennsylvania legislature	1873		
1874 Pennsylvania legislature	1874		
1875 Pennsylvania legislature	1875		
1876 Pennsylvania legislature	1876		
1877 Pennsylvania legislature	1877		
1878 Pennsylvania legislature	1878		
1879-1880 Pennsylvania legislature	1879		
1881-1882 Pennsylvania legislature	1881		
Pennsylvania Constitution of 1874
1883-1884 Pennsylvania legislature	1883		
1885-1886 Pennsylvania legislature	1885		
1887-1888 Pennsylvania legislature	1887		
1889-1890 Pennsylvania legislature	1889		
1891-1892 Pennsylvania legislature	1891		
1893-1894 Pennsylvania legislature	1893		
1895-1896 Pennsylvania legislature	1895		
1897-1898 Pennsylvania legislature	1897		
1899-1900 Pennsylvania legislature	1899		
1901-1902 Pennsylvania legislature	1901		
1903-1904 Pennsylvania legislature	1903		
1905-1906 Pennsylvania legislature	1905		
1907-1908 Pennsylvania legislature	1907		
1909-1910 Pennsylvania legislature	1909		
1911-1912 Pennsylvania legislature	1911		
1913-1914 Pennsylvania legislature	1913		
1915-1916 Pennsylvania legislature	1915		
1917-1918 Pennsylvania legislature	1917		
1919-1920 Pennsylvania legislature	1919		
1921-1922 Pennsylvania legislature	1921		
1923-1924 Pennsylvania legislature	1923		
1925-1926 Pennsylvania legislature	1925		
1927-1928 Pennsylvania legislature	1927		
1929-1930 Pennsylvania legislature	1929		
1931-1932 Pennsylvania legislature	1931		
1933-1934 Pennsylvania legislature	1933		
1935-1936 Pennsylvania legislature	1935		
1937-1938 Pennsylvania legislature	1937		
1939-1940 Pennsylvania legislature	1939		
1941-1942 Pennsylvania legislature	1941		
1943-1944 Pennsylvania legislature	1942		
1945-1946 Pennsylvania legislature	1944		
1947-1948 Pennsylvania legislature	1947		
1949-1950 Pennsylvania legislature	1949		
1951-1952 Pennsylvania legislature	1951		
1953-1954 Pennsylvania legislature	1953		
1955-1956 Pennsylvania legislature	1955		
1957-1958 Pennsylvania legislature	1957		
1959-1960 Pennsylvania legislature	1959		
1961-1962 Pennsylvania legislature	1961		
1963-1964 Pennsylvania legislature	1963		
1965-1966 Pennsylvania legislature	1965		
1967-1968 Pennsylvania legislature	1967		
Pennsylvania Constitution of 1968
1969-1970 Pennsylvania legislature	1969		
1971-1972 Pennsylvania legislature	1971		
1973-1974 Pennsylvania legislature	1973		
1975-1976 Pennsylvania legislature	1975		
1977-1978 Pennsylvania legislature	1977		
1979-1980 Pennsylvania legislature	1979		
1981-1982 Pennsylvania legislature	1981		
1983-1984 Pennsylvania legislature	1983		
1985-1986 Pennsylvania legislature	1985		
1987-1988 Pennsylvania legislature	1987		
1989-1990 Pennsylvania legislature	1989		
1991-1992 Pennsylvania legislature	1991		
1993-1994 Pennsylvania legislature	1993		
1995-1996 Pennsylvania legislature	1995		
1997-1998 Pennsylvania legislature	1997		
1999-2000 Pennsylvania legislature	1999		
2001-2002 Pennsylvania legislature	2001		November 7, 2000: House, Senate
2003-2004 Pennsylvania legislature	2003		November 2002: House, Senate
2005-2006 Pennsylvania legislature	2005		November 2004: House, Senate
2007-2008 Pennsylvania legislature	2007		November 2006: House, Senate
2009-2010 Pennsylvania legislature	2009		November 4, 2008: House, Senate
2011-2012 Pennsylvania legislature	2011		November 2010: House, Senate
2013-2014 Pennsylvania legislature	2013		November 2012: House, Senate
2015-2016 Pennsylvania legislature	2015		November 2014: House, Senate
2017-2018 Pennsylvania legislature	2017		November 2016: House, Senate
2019-2020 Pennsylvania legislature	2019		November 2018: House, Senate
2021-2022 Pennsylvania legislature	2021		November 2020: House, Senate
2023-2024 Pennsylvania legislature	2023		November 2022: House, Senate
2025-2026 Pennsylvania legislature	2025		November 5, 2024: House, Senate

== See also ==
- 2005 Pennsylvania General Assembly pay raise controversy
- 2006 Pennsylvania General Assembly bonus controversy
- List of speakers of the Pennsylvania House of Representatives
- List of presidents pro tempore of the Pennsylvania Senate
- List of governors of Pennsylvania
- Capitol of Pennsylvania
- Historical outline of Pennsylvania
- Lists of United States state legislative sessions
