= John Stauffer =

John Stauffer may refer to:

- John Stauffer (politician) (1925–2019), American politician
- John Stauffer (professor), American academic
- John Stauffer Sr., co-founder of Stauffer Chemical
