= Loeper =

Loeper is a surname of German origin. Notable people with the surname include:

- F. Joseph Loeper (born 1944), American politician
- Friedrich-Wilhelm von Loeper (1888–1983), German general
- Wilhelm Loeper (footballer) (born 1998), Swedish footballer
- Wilhelm Friedrich Loeper (1883–1935), German politician
