= Tim Kearney =

Tim Kearney may refer to:

- Tim Kearney (American football), American football player
- Tim Kearney (politician), American politician from Pennsylvania
