= Clyde Dengler =

American politician

Clyde R. Dengler

Member of the Pennsylvania Senate from the 26th district
- In office January 7, 1969 – November 30, 1974
- Preceded by: Lyle G. Hall
- Succeeded by: John James Sweeney

Personal details
- Born: May 10, 1899 Fleetwood, Pennsylvania
- Died: August 15, 1992 (aged 93)

Clyde Russell Dengler (May 10, 1899 – August 15, 1992) served in the Pennsylvania State Senate, serving from 1969 to 1974.
