= John James Sweeney =

American politician (1927–2026)

Member of the Pennsylvania Senate from the 26th district
- In office January 7, 1975 – November 30, 1978
- Preceded by: Clyde Dengler
- Succeeded by: Joseph Loeper

Personal details
- Born: June 1, 1927 Philadelphia, Pennsylvania, U.S.
- Died: October 2, 2026 (aged 99)

John James Sweeney (June 1, 1927 – October 2, 2026) was an American politician. He was a member of the Pennsylvania State Senate, serving from 1975 to 1978.

Sweeney was born in Philadelphia, Pennsylvania on June 1, 1927. He died on October 2, 2026, at the age of 99.
