= Mike Folmer =

American politician (born 1956)

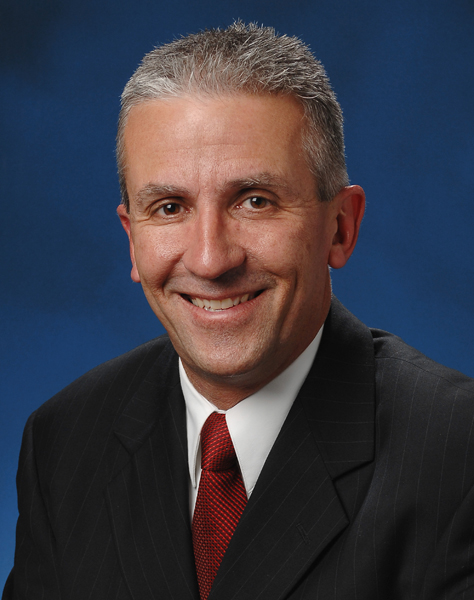
- undated photo, before March 2010

Member of the Pennsylvania Senate from the 48th district
- In office January 2, 2007 – September 18, 2019
- Preceded by: David Brightbill
- Succeeded by: Dave Arnold

Personal details
- Born: January 2, 1956 (age 70) Lebanon, Pennsylvania, U.S.
- Party: Republican
- Other political affiliations: Democratic (until sometime between 1988 and 2005)
- Spouse: Sheila Folmer
- Criminal information
- Status: Probation
- Convictions: Child pornography possession and criminal communication
- Penalty: 1–2 years in prison, 8 years probation, 15 years on state sex offender registry

Details
- Date apprehended: 2020
- Imprisoned at: Released on probation in 2021

Michael Folmer (born January 2, 1956) is an American politician and confessed sex offender. He represented the 48th district in the Pennsylvania State Senate, which includes all of Lebanon County and portions of Dauphin and York Counties, from 2007 to 2019. He is a member of the Republican Party.

In September 2019 he was arrested on child pornography charges and resigned his State Senate seat. In July 2020, Folmer was sentenced to one to two years in county jail.

== Personal life ==
Folmer was born and raised in Lebanon, Pennsylvania. After graduating from Lebanon Senior High School in 1974, he attended Grace College (in Indiana) where he majored in History and received his Bachelor of Arts degree in 1978. He returned to the Lebanon Valley where he worked in financial consulting and sales management. In the 1990s and early 2000s, Folmer worked in the produce industry, including his related family-owned business.

== Early political career ==
In 1986, Folmer was elected to Lebanon City Council as a Democrat and served a single two-year term.

Folmer became a Republican sometime after his tenure on the city council. In 2005, Folmer and other local concerned citizens organized the Constitutional Organization Of Lebanon (COOL).

== Pennsylvania senate ==
=== 2006 Election ===
In 2006, Folmer, who was known through his campaign as "Citizen Mike", was one of several challengers whose campaigns were sparked by the state's 2005 legislative pay raise. Folmer's district was represented by 25-year incumbent Chip Brightbill, the Senate majority leader. Brightbill, along with Senate President pro tempore Robert Jubelirer took much of the criticism for the pay raise and were among the primary targets of activists seeking to vote out legislators who supported it.

His campaign's largest contributor was Bob Guzzardi, however most of his funding came from small donations of individuals within his district.

On election day, Folmer overcame Brightbill's 20–1 fundraising advantage of $1 million to $50,000 and won with over 63% of the vote. Folmer went on to defeat Democrat John Liss in the general election with over 63% of the vote.

=== 2010 election ===
In the 2010 election, Folmer was challenged by Democrat Jo Ellen Litz, one of Lebanon County's three County Commissioners. He was re-elected with over 72% of the vote.

In 2013, Folmer became the majority chair for the Pennsylvania Senate committee on education.

=== 2014 election ===
Folmer was unopposed and won the 2014 primary and general elections with 2,359 and 12,919 votes, respectively.

In 2015, Folmer became the majority chair of the Pennsylvania Senate's State Government committee. He co-sponsored Senate Bill 3, to legalize medical marijuana in the state, which was signed into law in April 2016.

=== 2018 election ===
Folmer was unopposed in the 2018 primary election, with 4,121 votes, and defeated Democrat Lois K. Herr in November's general election.

== Arrest, resignation, and aftermath ==
On September 17, 2019, Folmer was arrested and charged with possession of child pornography, and criminal use of a communication facility. Police traced a sexually explicit image of an underage girl to Folmer's computer; Folmer had uploaded it to his Tumblr blog in December 2017. Two more such images were found on his cell phone. He was released on $25,000 bail.

Amid bipartisan calls for him to step down, Folmer resigned from office the day after his arrest. A week later, Lieutenant Governor John Fetterman scheduled a special election for January 14, 2020, to determine Folmer's successor, which was won by Republican Lebanon County District Attorney Dave Arnold.

Folmer waived his preliminary hearing in October 2019. In late February 2020, he pleaded guilty to three counts of possessing child pornography and one count of criminal use of a communications facility; a sentencing hearing was scheduled for late May. In July 2020, Folmer was sentenced to one to two years in county jail plus eight years on probation. He was placed initially at Lebanon County prison.

Parole was approved in June 2021 and Folmer was released from prison in July 2021 to serve his probation and remain registered as a sex offender for 15 years.

Pennsylvania State Senate
Preceded by David Brightbill	Member of the Pennsylvania Senate for the 48th District; 2007–2019	Succeeded by Dave Arnold
