= Wayne D. Fontana =

American politician (born 1950)

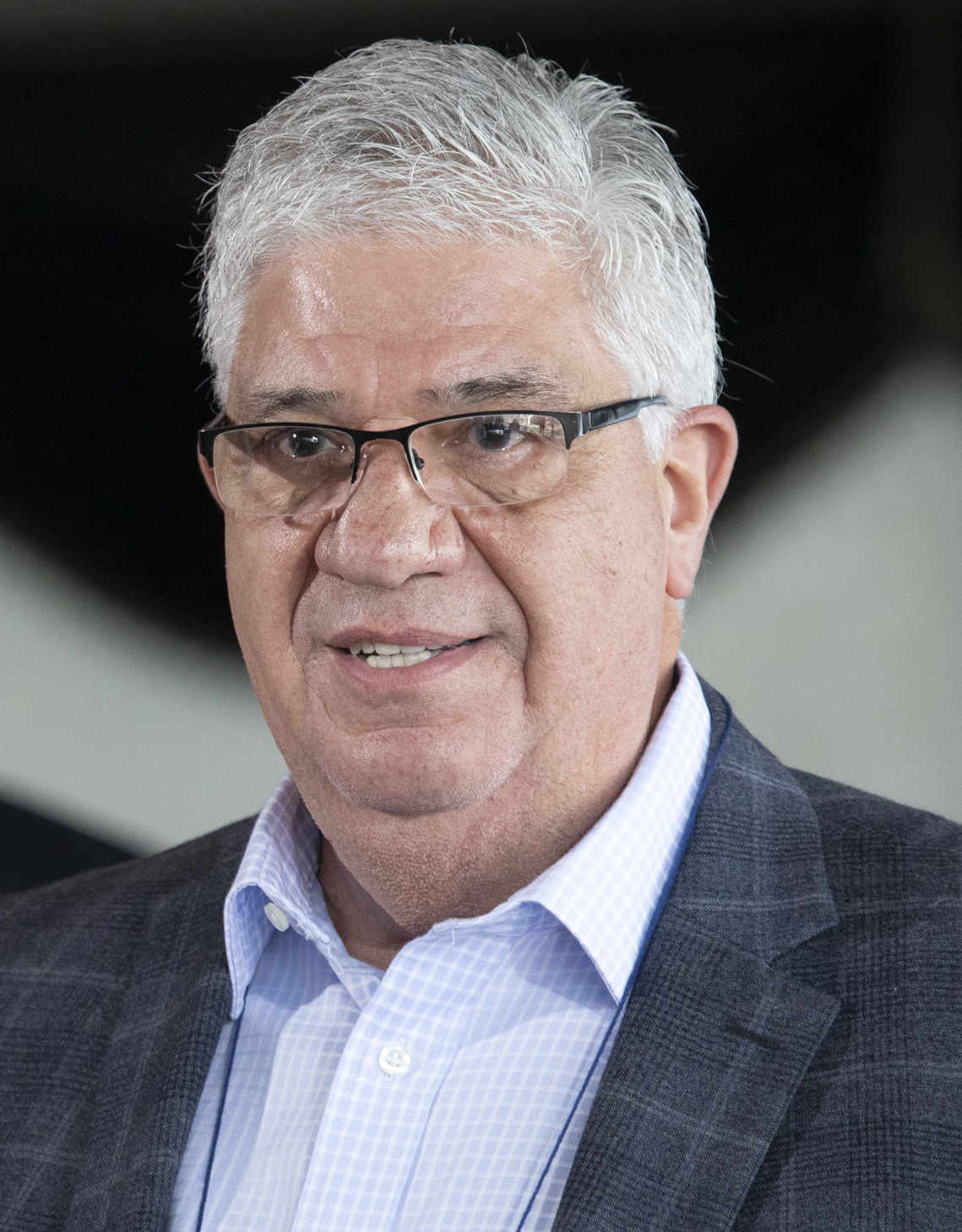

Member of the Pennsylvania Senate from the 42nd district
- Incumbent
- Assumed office June 14, 2005
- Preceded by: Jack Wagner

Member of the Allegheny County Council from the 12th District
- In office January 3, 2000 – March 15, 2005
- Preceded by: Position established
- Succeeded by: Rich Nerone

Personal details
- Born: March 12, 1950 (age 76) Pittsburgh, Pennsylvania
- Party: Democratic
- Spouse: Francine
- Education: Community College of Allegheny County
- Profession: Real estate agent

Wayne D. Fontana (born March 12, 1950) is an American politician who serves as a Democratic member of the Pennsylvania State Senate, representing the 42nd District since 2005.

== Background ==
Fontana was born and raised in the Beechview section of Pittsburgh, and graduated from the Community College of Allegheny County in 1971 with an Associate’s Degree in Business. A former truck driver and member of Teamsters Locals 249 and 211, he went into real estate and worked for Howard Hanna Real Estate Services as a sales manager and associate broker. He is married to Francine Fontana and has three children.

== Political career ==
Fontana entered politics as a Democratic committee member in Pittsburgh's 19th Ward, and later rose to vice chair of the Allegheny County Democratic Committee. In 1999, Fontana was elected as an original member of Allegheny County Council (representing District 12) after it was formed under the new home-rule charter. He served as the council's vice president from January 2004 to March 2005.

In January 2005, Senator Jack Wagner resigned from the 42nd District of the Pennsylvania State Senate after having been elected Pennsylvania Auditor General. Fontana won the May 17, 2005 special election for the remainder of Wagner's term, winning 55% of the vote and defeating his closest opponent, Democrat-turned-Republican state Representative Michael Diven. Fontana was re-elected in 2006, 2010, 2014, 2018, and 2022.

=== Committees and leadership ===
For the 2025-2026 Session Fontana sits on the following committees in the State Senate:

- Law & Justice (Minority Chair)
- Community, Economic & Recreational Development
- Finance
- Urban Affairs & Housing

Fontana joined the Senate Democratic leadership as caucus administrator in 2011. He was elected caucus chairman in 2014.
