= Jake Corman =

American politician (born 1964)

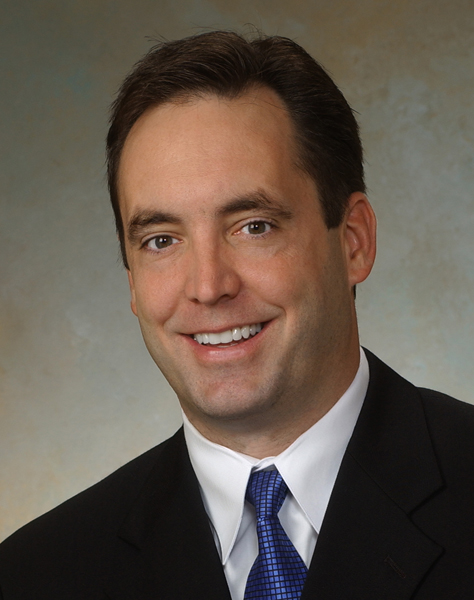

President pro tempore of the Pennsylvania Senate
- In office November 12, 2020 – November 30, 2022
- Preceded by: Joe Scarnati
- Succeeded by: Kim Ward

Majority Leader of the Pennsylvania Senate
- In office January 6, 2015 – November 12, 2020
- Preceded by: Dominic Pileggi
- Succeeded by: Kim Ward

Member of the Pennsylvania Senate from the 34th district
- In office January 7, 1999 – November 30, 2022
- Preceded by: Doyle Corman
- Succeeded by: Greg Rothman

Personal details
- Born: Jacob Doyle Corman III; September 9, 1964 (age 61) Bellefonte, Pennsylvania, U.S.
- Party: Republican
- Spouse: Kelli Lopsonzski
- Children: 3
- Education: Pennsylvania College of Technology; Pennsylvania State University (BA)
- Website: Official website

Jacob Doyle Corman III (born September 9, 1964) is an American politician who served as the president pro tempore of the Pennsylvania Senate from 2020 to 2022.

He was a member of the Pennsylvania Senate 1999 to 2022, holding the same seat his father, Doyle Corman, previously held. A member of the Republican Party, he was majority leader from 2015 to 2020, and president pro tempore from 2020 to 2022. Corman represented the 34th Senate District, which includes all of Centre, Mifflin and Juniata Counties and portions of Huntingdon County, and includes State College.

In the lead-up to the 2020 elections, Corman and other Republicans in the state legislature refused to implement changes that would allow Pennsylvania officials to process mail-in ballots before election day. As a result, counting of ballots in Philadelphia took several days, leaving it unclear for days who had won the 2020 presidential election. After Joe Biden won the 2020 election and Donald Trump refused to concede while making false claims of fraud, Corman called for an audit of the election in Pennsylvania and called on Pennsylvania Secretary of State Kathy Boockvar to resign. He supported Republican efforts to obtain a wide range of data and personal information on voters to pursue claims of fraud.

In November 2021, Corman announced he would be seeking the 2022 Republican nomination for Governor of Pennsylvania. He withdrew from the race on April 12, 2022, but then re-entered the same day. He dropped out again on May 12, endorsing Lou Barletta.

From May 17, 2022 to May 23, 2022, Corman served as acting lieutenant governor of Pennsylvania while Lieutenant Governor John Fetterman recovered from the implantation of a pacemaker.

== Personal ==
Corman was State Director for Central Pennsylvania for United States senator Rick Santorum from 1994 through 1998. He was Field Service Director for the Pennsylvania Builders Association from 1993 through 1994.

== Career ==
In 1998, Corman's father, Doyle Corman, a Pennsylvania state senator for 21 years, announced his retirement from the Senate. Corman announced that he would run for his father's seat. During the three-way GOP primary, Corman was attacked by the other candidates for a 1995 drunk driving conviction, as well as his admission to experimenting with marijuana in the 1980s.

In 2002, Corman was re-elected with over 92% of the vote, facing only minimal opposition from a Libertarian Party candidate. In 2006, Corman defeated Democrat Jon Eich, Robert J. Cash, and Libertarian Thomas Martin with 56% of the vote. After the leadership shakeup following the 2006 elections, Corman bid for the position of Senate Majority Leader, but was edged out by Dominic Pileggi and was ultimately elected as the Majority Policy Chairman, succeeding Joe Scarnati. After the 2008 election, Corman became Chairman of the Senate Appropriations Committee.

The Pennsylvania Report named him to the 2009 "The Pennsylvania Report 100" list of influential figures in Pennsylvania politics and called him one of the state's "rising stars."

In 2010, Corman again defeated Democrat Jon Eich for re-election garnering 69.4% of the vote. In 2014 and 2016, Corman was unopposed for re-election. In 2018, he again won re-election after defeating Democrat Ezra Nanes by more than 10,500 votes. After the 2014 election, Corman became Senate Majority Leader.

=== 2020 elections ===
Prior to the 2020 election, Corman and other Republicans in the state legislature refused to implement changes that would allow Pennsylvania officials to process mail-in ballots before election day. As a result, counting of ballots in Philadelphia took several days, leaving it unclear for days who had won the 2020 United States presidential election in Pennsylvania. On the night of the election, Corman called for the resignation of Pennsylvania Secretary of State Kathy Boockvar for allowing county boards to give voters an opportunity to "cure" their ballots if they were rejected.

In January 2021, Corman and other Republicans in the Pennsylvania Senate refused to seat incumbent Jim Brewster who won a close reelection against his opponent who refused to concede the race. Even though Brewster's election victory had been certified by state officials. The Republican majority then had Lieutenant Governor John Fetterman removed from presiding over the Senate and installed Corman in Fetterman's place.

Even though there were no indications of fraud in the 2020 election, Corman called for a "full forensic investigation" into the 2020 election. Corman supported Republican efforts to obtain a wide range of data and personal information on voters to pursue baseless claims of fraud.

=== Gubernatorial run ===
In November 2021, Corman announced he would be running in the Republican primary race for Pennsylvania governor. He campaigned as the "conservative who stood up to" Democratic governor Tom Wolf, citing his legal efforts to overturn Wolf's mask mandate in schools during the COVID-19 pandemic, successful opposition to Wolf's proposed taxes, and his support for a partisan investigation into 2020 presidential election. On April 12, 2022, Corman filed a petition in state court to remove his name from the primary ballot, he however reversed that decision later that day saying that former president Donald Trump encouraged him to stay in the race. Still, Corman remained low in the polls. He announced on May 12 that he would be dropping out of the race again and endorsed former congressman Lou Barletta for governor. Corman's name still appeared on the ballot though and received 26,000 votes .

=== Acting lieutenant governor ===
On May 17, 2022, Governor Wolf announced that Corman would temporarily assume the duties of acting lieutenant governor while Lieutenant Governor John Fetterman had a pacemaker implanted and recovered. Corman served in this capacity until May 23, 2022.

== Political positions ==
In 2017, Corman sponsored Senate Bill 1, a pension reform legislation that was enacted.

Corman, as well as former Pennsylvania Treasurer Rob McCord, sued the NCAA, seeking to reverse sanctions that the athletic association imposed against Penn State after the Penn State child sex abuse scandal. In a settlement, the NCAA lifted the sanctions against the university. The lawsuit initially aimed to require Penn State's $60 million fine to be spent on child abuse prevention in Pennsylvania, rather than across the U.S., but the suit later morphed to challenge the legality of the sanctions themselves. Corman accused the NCAA of unfairly singling out Penn State and said that the sanctions were "extremely damaging to my community"; the NCAA responded that Corman was seeking to politicize the NCAA's safety efforts.

While Corman voted for Pennsylvania's medical cannabis program, he is against both the decriminalization and legalization of cannabis in Pennsylvania. He believes cannabis is a gateway drug. He stated that: "I will do everything in my power to prevent legalization of recreational marijuana."

In 2018, Corman was the prime sponsor of an anti-hazing bill (Senate Bill 1090), which was signed into law later that year as Timothy J. Piazza Anti-Hazing Law (Act 80). The law, which passed the Pennsylvania Senate unanimously, strengthened anti-hazing laws.

As part of the 2018–19 budget process, Corman identified school safety funding as a priority.

In June 2019, Corman made national headlines for aggressively yelling over Democratic state senator Katie Muth, as she read into record a letter from formerly homeless resident John Boyd, who encouraged representatives to not take away monthly General Assistance funds from him and other vulnerable citizens.

== Electoral history ==
1998 Pennsylvania Senate Republican primary election, District 34
Party	Candidate	Votes	%
Republican	Jake Corman	8,295	44.12
Republican	Connie Lucas	6,814	36.24
Republican	Vicki Bumbarger Wedler	3,694	19.65
Total votes		18,803	100.00

1998 Pennsylvania Senate election, District 34
Party	Candidate	Votes	%
Republican	Jake Corman	30,129	52.08
Democratic	Scott Conklin	27,724	47.92
Total votes		57,853	100.00

2002 Pennsylvania Senate election, District 34
Party	Candidate	Votes	%
Republican	Jake Corman	57,472	92.56
Libertarian	Daniel W. Tuel	4,620	7.44
Total votes		62,092	100.00

2006 Pennsylvania Senate Republican primary election, District 34
Party	Candidate	Votes	%
Republican	Jake Corman	13,011	63.70
Republican	Penny W. Staver	7,414	36.30
Total votes		20,425	100.00

2006 Pennsylvania Senate election, District 34
Party	Candidate	Votes	%
Republican	Jake Corman	43,028	56.04
Democratic	Jon Eich	30,025	39.10
Libertarian	Thomas A. Martin	2,140	2.78
Independent	Robert J. Cash	1,590	2.07
Total votes		76,783	100.00

2010 Pennsylvania Senate election, District 34
Party	Candidate	Votes	%
Republican	Jake Corman	53,822	69.43
Democratic	Jon Eich	23,697	30.57
Total votes		77,519	100.00

2014 Pennsylvania Senate election, District 34
Party	Candidate	Votes	%
Republican	Jake Corman	Unopposed	
Total votes		46,391	100.00

2018 Pennsylvania Senate election, District 34
Party	Candidate	Votes	%
Republican	Jake Corman	46,259	52.37
Democratic	Ezra J. Nanes	39,075	44.24
Total votes		88,334	100.00

== Sources ==
- Trostle, Sharon, ed. (2007). The Pennsylvania Manual (PDF). Vol. 118. Harrisburg, Pennsylvania: Pennsylvania Department of General Services. ISBN 978-0-8182-0318-3. Archived from the original on August 5, 2014.

Pennsylvania State Senate
Preceded by Doyle Corman	Member of the Pennsylvania Senate from the 34th district 1999–2022	Incumbent
Preceded by Dominic Pileggi	Majority Leader of the Pennsylvania Senate; 2015–2020	Succeeded by Kim Ward
Preceded by Joe Scarnati	President pro tempore of the Pennsylvania Senate; 2020–2022	Succeeded by Kim Ward
