= Clarence Manbeck =

American politician

Clarence F. Manbeck

Member of the Pennsylvania Senate from the 48th district
- In office January 7, 1969 – November 30, 1982
- Preceded by: Richard Frame
- Succeeded by: David Brightbill
- Constituency: Parts of Lebanon, Berks, and Lancaster Counties

Member of the Pennsylvania House of Representatives from the Lebanon County district
- In office 1961–1966

Personal details
- Born: September 21, 1908
- Died: May 14, 1991 (aged 82)
- Party: Republican
- Occupation: Farmer, Politician

Clarence F. Manbeck (September 21, 1908 – May 14, 1991) was a Republican member of the Pennsylvania State Senate, serving from 1969 to 1982. He also served in the Pennsylvania House of Representatives.

Manbeck founded Farmers Pride in 1939, selling chickens in Ohio and Pennsylvania. He sold the business in the 1980s. A bridge in Bethel Township, Lebanon County is named the Senator Clarence F. Manbeck Bridge.
