= Thomas J. McGarrigle =

American politician

Member of the Pennsylvania Senate from the 26th district
- In office January 2, 2015 – November 30, 2018
- Preceded by: Edwin Erickson
- Succeeded by: Tim Kearney

Personal details
- Born: April 28, 1959 (age 67)
- Party: Republican
- Education: Delaware County Technical Schools, Springfield High School

Thomas J. "Tom" McGarrigle (born April 28, 1959) is a Pennsylvania politician. A Republican, he was the Pennsylvania State Senator for the 26th district until 2018. Prior to being elected to the State Senate in the 2014 election, McGarrigle served as chairman of the Delaware County Council. McGarrigle lost his 2018 reelection bid to Democrat Tim Kearney, then mayor of Swarthmore, Pennsylvania. In 2019 he was chosen to lead the Delaware County Republican Party.
