= Swarthmore, Pennsylvania =

Borough in Pennsylvania, US

- Borough
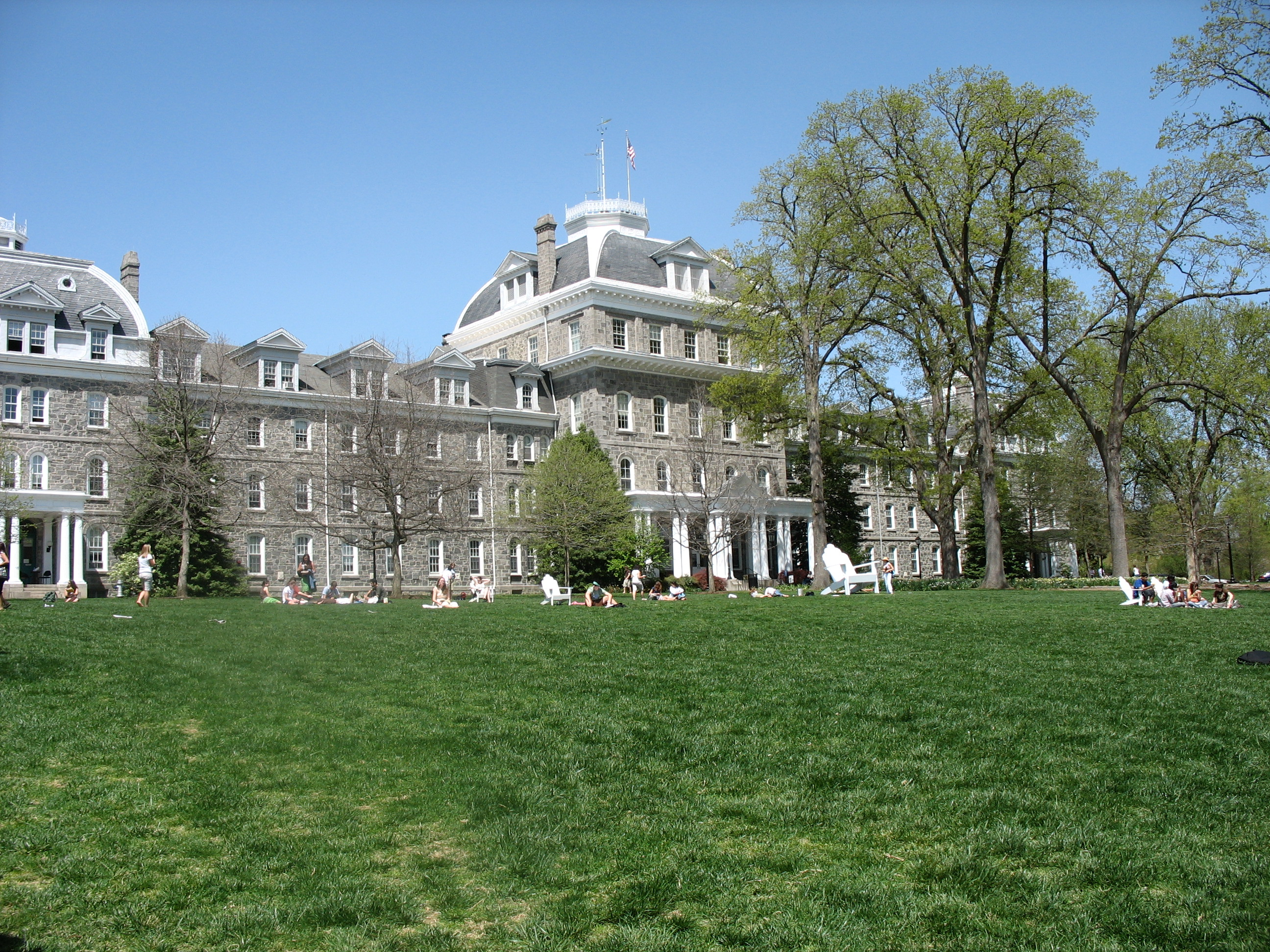
- Parrish Hall at Swarthmore College

- Location of Swarthmore in Delaware County (top) and of Delaware County in Pennsylvania (bottom)
- Coordinates: 39°54′06″N 75°20′49″W
- Country: United States
- State: Pennsylvania
- County: Delaware

Government
  - Mayor: Conlen Booth

Area
  - Total: 1.40 sq mi (3.63 km^{2})
  - Land: 1.40 sq mi (3.63 km^{2})
  - Water: 0 sq mi (0.00 km^{2})
- Elevation: 125 ft (38 m)

Population (2010)
  - Total: 6,194
  - Estimate (2019): 6,346
  - Density: 4,533.2/sq mi (1,750.28/km^{2})
- Time zone: UTC-5 (EST)
  - Summer (DST): UTC-4 (EDT)
- ZIP code: 19081
- Area codes: 610 and 484
- FIPS code: 42-045-75648
- FIPS code: 42-75648
- GNIS feature ID: 1189142
- Website: www.swarthmorepa.org

Swarthmore (/ˈswɔːrθmɔːr/ SWORTH-mor, locally /ˈswɑːθmɔːr/ SWAHTH-mor) is a borough in Delaware County, Pennsylvania, United States. Swarthmore was originally named Westdale in honor of painter Benjamin West, who was one of the early residents of the town. The name was changed to Swarthmore after the establishment of Swarthmore College. As of the 2020 census, Swarthmore had a population of 6,543.

== History ==
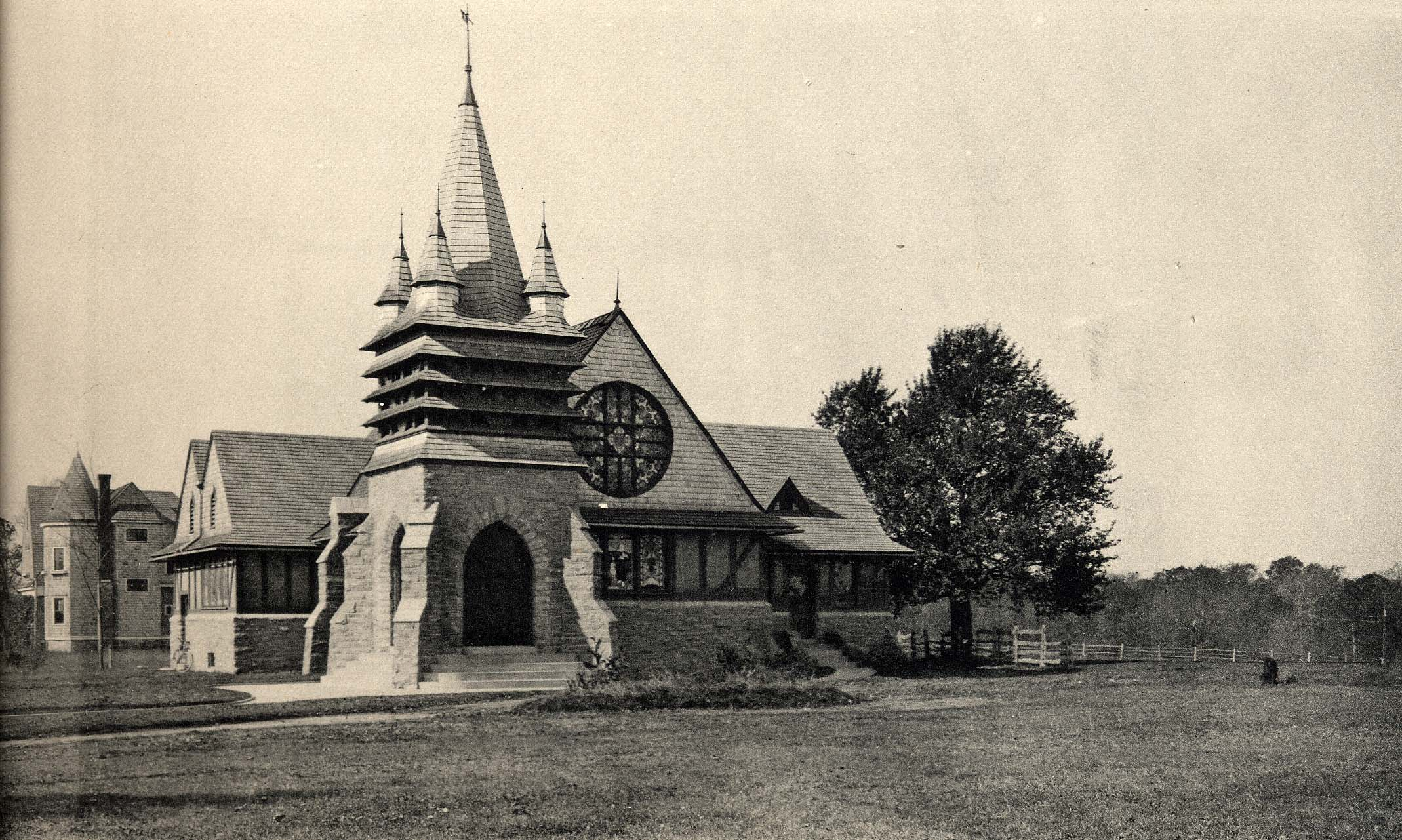
Presbyterian Church, designed by William Lightfoot Price, about 1897

Originally, the area belonged to the Lenape people. It was settled in the late 1600s by Quakers after William Penn granted them the land. By the early 1800s, it was still mainly farmland, and was known as Westdale in honor of local artist Benjamin West. It was part of Springfield Township, but the area began to become a distinct town after Swarthmore College was founded in 1864. The advent of passenger rail service from Philadelphia in the 1880s greatly enhanced the desirability of the borough as a commuter suburb, and the borough was incorporated in 1893.

About one third of the borough's land area consists of the Swarthmore College campus. Many of the streets in the southern half of town are named for eastern colleges, and much of the borough's housing stock dates from the Victorian period through the 1920s. The Ogden House and Benjamin West Birthplace are listed on the National Register of Historic Places.

== Geography ==
Swarthmore is located in east-central Delaware County at 39°54′6″N 75°20′49″W (39.901788, −75.347083). It is bordered to the north, east, and southwest by Springfield Township, to the southeast by Ridley Township, and to the west by Nether Providence Township. Crum Creek, a southward-flowing tributary of the Delaware River, forms the western boundary of the borough.

According to the U.S. Census Bureau, Swarthmore borough has a total area of 1.40 square miles (3.63 km^{2}), all land. It has a humid subtropical climate (Cfa) and average monthly temperatures range from 33.1 °F in January to 78.0 °F in July. The local hardiness zone is 7a.

== Government ==
Swarthmore is represented in the Pennsylvania General Assembly as the PA 165th Legislative District and the PA 26th Senate District. The former position is held by Rep. Jennifer O'Mara and the latter by former Swarthmore mayor Sen. Tim Kearney, both Democrats.

== Demographics ==
Historical population
Census	Pop.	Note	%±
1900	903		—
1910	1,899		110.3%
1920	2,350		23.7%
1930	3,405		44.9%
1940	4,061		19.3%
1950	4,825		18.8%
1960	5,753		19.2%
1970	6,156		7.0%
1980	5,950		−3.3%
1990	6,157		3.5%
2000	6,170		0.2%
2010	6,194		0.4%
2020	6,543		5.6%

As of the 2010 census, there were 6,194 people, 1,963 households, and 1,327 families residing in the borough. The population density was 4,460.4 inhabitants per square mile (1,722.2/km^{2}). There were 2,081 housing units at an average density of 1,492.1 units per square mile (576.1 units/km^{2}). The racial makeup of the borough was 82.5% White, 7.7% Asian, 5.0% African American, 0.3% Native American, 0.1% Pacific Islander, .7% from other races, and 3.8% from two or more races. Hispanic or Latino of any race were 4.9% of the population.

There were 1,963 households, out of which 34.1% had children under the age of 18 living with them, 57.3% were married couples living together, 7.8% had a female householder with no husband present, 2.4% had a male householder with no wife present, and 32.4% were non-families. 27.6% of all households were made up of individuals, and 12.5% had someone living alone who was 65 years of age or older. The average household size was 2.48 and the average family size was 3.06.

In the borough, the population was spread out, with 20.7% under the age of 18, 15.8% from 20 to 24, 15.3% from 25 to 44, 25.4% from 45 to 64, and 12.4% who were 65 years of age or older. The median age was 30.8 years. For every 100 females, there were 89.7 males. For every 100 females age 18 and over, there were 86.9 males.

As of 2015, median income for a household in the borough was $101,686, and the median income for a family was $144,570. Males had a median income of $71,750 versus $51,117 for females. The per capita income for the borough was $40,482. About 0.0% of families and 2.3% of the population were below the poverty line.

== Education ==
Swarthmore lies within the Wallingford-Swarthmore School District. In 1971, the district was formed via a merger with the Nether Providence School District and Swarthmore-Rutledge School District. Public school students attend Swarthmore-Rutledge School, at 100 College Avenue in Swarthmore, for grades K-5. Public school students attend Strath Haven Middle School for grades 6–8 and Strath Haven High School for grades 9–12. Both of these schools are located in Wallingford.

The borough's only private school is the George Crothers Memorial School, housed in the old Rutgers Avenue School. Notre Dame de Lourdes Catholic School is located adjacent to the borough in Ridley Township.

The borough is home to Swarthmore College, a private liberal arts college founded in 1864.

== Transportation ==
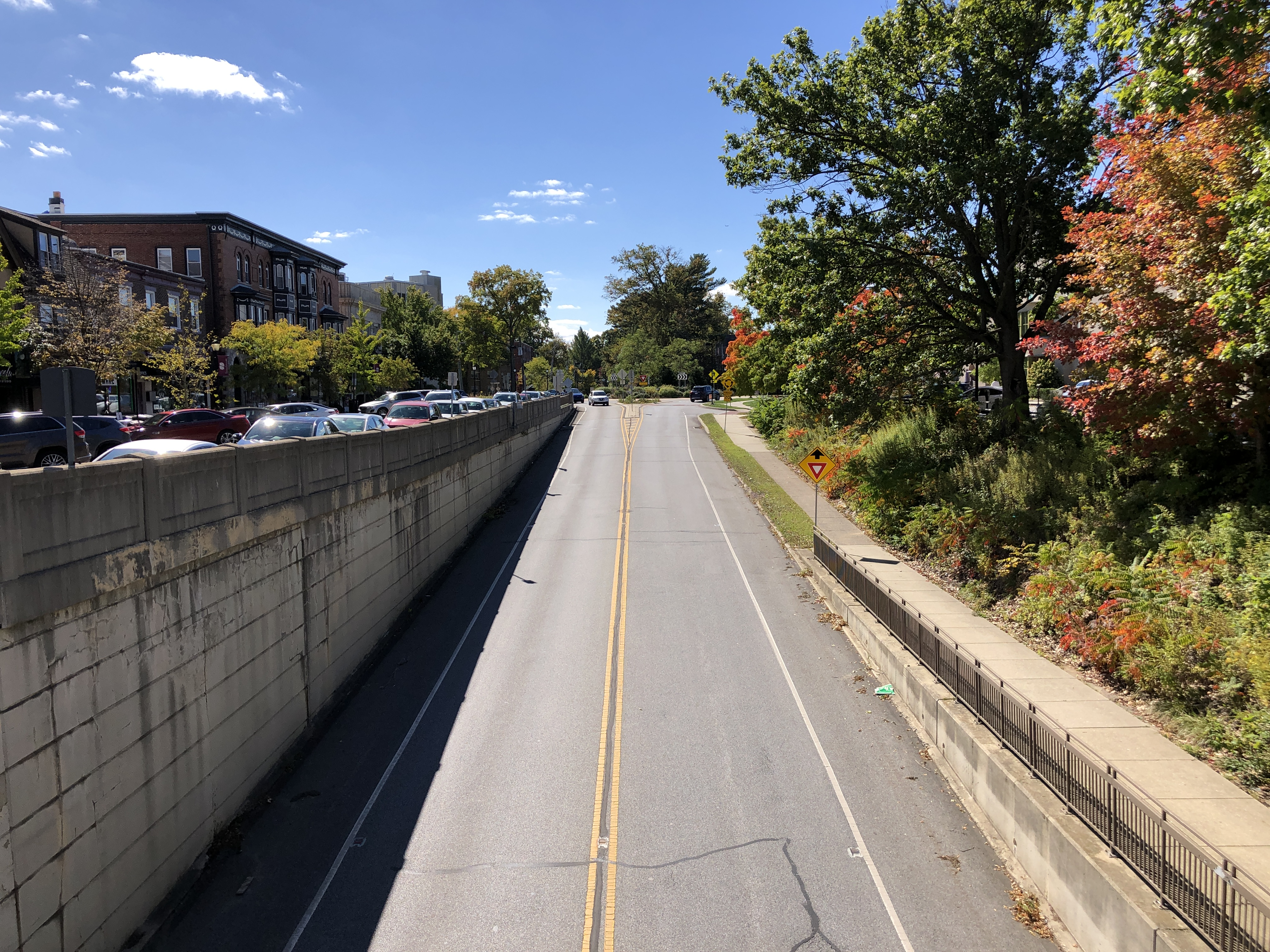
PA 320 southbound in Swarthmore

As of 2016 there were 18.88 miles (30.38 km) of public roads in Swarthmore, of which 3.02 miles (4.86 km) were maintained by the Pennsylvania Department of Transportation (PennDOT) and 15.86 miles (25.52 km) were maintained by the borough.

Pennsylvania Route 320 is the only numbered highway serving Swarthmore. It follows a north–south alignment through the center of the borough via Chester Road, Swarthmore Avenue and Cedar Lane.

Swarthmore Station, a SEPTA Regional Rail train station on the Media/Wawa Line, sits between the college and the town's center. SEPTA Route 109 bus connecting Chester with Upper Darby stops along Pennsylvania Route 320.

== Cultural institutions ==
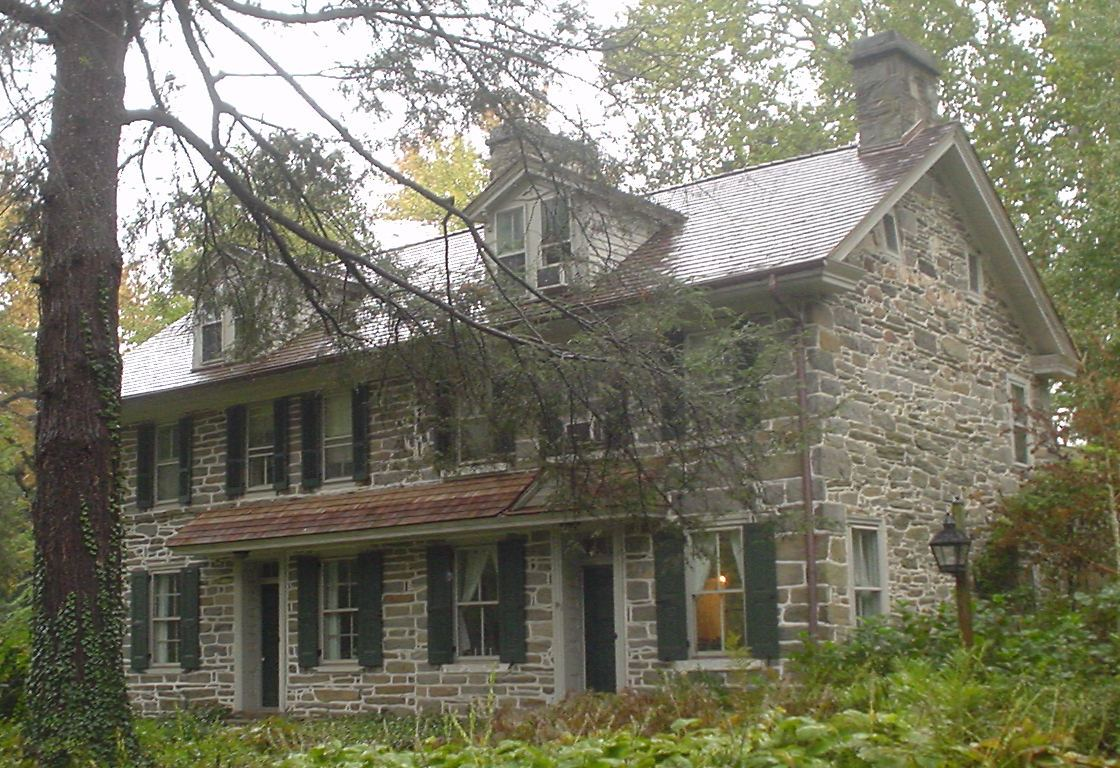
The Ogden House

Scott Arboretum is located on the campus of Swarthmore College.

The Swarthmore Public Library is at 121 Park Avenue in the center of the borough.

The Park Avenue Community Center is adjacent to Swarthmore Borough Hall and hosts a range of cultural activities, theater and music.

== Notable people ==
- Edmund Bacon (architect) (1910–2005), Noted Urban Planner for the City of Philadelphia, Father of Kevin Bacon
- Dave Garroway (1913–1982), television personality
- Valerie Hollister (born 1939), artist and painter
- John Honnold (1915–2011), law professor, University of Pennsylvania Law School
- Edmund Jones, Swarthmore Mayor from 1966–1971 and Pennsylvania State Representative 1971–1974
- Tim Kearney, Swarthmore Mayor from 2014–2018 and Pennsylvania State Senator from 2019–current
- Walter Ferris Price (1857–1951), architect
- Mary Gay Scanlon (born 1959), United States Representative
- Rogers Stevens (born 1970), guitarist of band Blind Melon
- Benjamin West (1738–1820), British-American painter
- Alice Putnam Willetts (1926–2020), an American field hockey and lacrosse player and coach
- John Caspar Wister (1887–1982), horticulturalist
