= John Stauffer (politician) =

American politician (1925–2019)

Member of the Pennsylvania Senate from the 19th district
- In office November 17, 1970 – November 30, 1988
- Preceded by: John Ware
- Succeeded by: Earl Baker

Republican Leader of the Pennsylvania Senate
- In office January 1, 1985 – November 30, 1988
- Preceded by: Robert Jubelirer
- Succeeded by: Joseph Loeper

Republican Whip of the Pennsylvania Senate

Member of the Pennsylvania House of Representatives
- In office January 4, 1977 – November 30, 1982
- Preceded by: Newell Wood
- Succeeded by: Joseph Loeper

Member of the Pennsylvania House of Representatives for the 157th district
- In office January 7, 1969 – November 17, 1970
- Preceded by: District Created
- Succeeded by: Richard Schultze

Member of the Pennsylvania House of Representatives for the Chester County district
- In office January 5, 1965 – November 30, 1968

Personal details
- Born: May 28, 1925 Phoenixville, Pennsylvania, U.S.
- Died: October 26, 2019 (aged 94) Lancaster, Pennsylvania, U.S.
- Party: Republican
- Occupation: Businessman

John Stauffer (May 28, 1925 – October 26, 2019) was an American businessman and politician from Pennsylvania who served as a Republican member of the Pennsylvania Senate for the 19th district from 1969 to 1988.

== Early life ==
Stauffer was born in Phoenixville, Pennsylvania and graduated from Phoenixville Area High School. He owned the Stauffer's Mens Store in Phoenixville.

== Political career ==
He served on the Phoenixville Borough Council and was president of the borough council. He served as a member of the Pennsylvania House of Representatives for the Chester County district from 1965 to 1966 and the 157th district from 1967 to 1970. Stauffer served as a member of the Pennsylvania State Senate for the 19th district from 1970 to 1988, including as Republican Whip from 1977 to 1982 and as Republican Leader from 1985 to 1988.

== Death and interment ==
Stauffer moved to Homestead Village in Lancaster, Pennsylvania in 1994 and died there in 2019. He is interred at the Green Tree Church of the Brethren Cemetery in Oaks, Pennsylvania.
