= Robert Jubelirer =

Pennsylvania politician (born 1937)

Robert C. Jubelirer

29th Lieutenant Governor of Pennsylvania
- In office October 5, 2001 – January 21, 2003
- Governor: Mark Schweiker
- Preceded by: Mark Schweiker
- Succeeded by: Catherine Baker Knoll

President pro tempore of the Pennsylvania Senate
- In office January 1, 1985 – November 18, 1992
- Preceded by: Henry Hager
- Succeeded by: Bob Mellow
- In office March 15, 1994 – November 30, 2006
- Preceded by: Bob Mellow
- Succeeded by: Joe Scarnati

Republican Leader of the Pennsylvania Senate
- In office January 6, 1981 – November 30, 1984
- Preceded by: Henry Hager
- Succeeded by: John Stauffer
- In office November 18, 1992 – March 15, 1994
- Preceded by: Joseph Loeper
- Succeeded by: Joseph Loeper

Member of the Pennsylvania State Senate from the 30th district
- In office January 7, 1975 – November 30, 2006
- Preceded by: Stanley Stroup
- Succeeded by: John Eichelberger

Personal details
- Born: February 9, 1937 (age 89) Altoona, Pennsylvania, U.S.
- Party: Republican
- Spouse: Renee Cohn Jubelirer
- Children: 3 (one deceased)
- Education: Pennsylvania State University (B.A.); Dickinson School of Law (LL.D.)
- Occupation: Attorney, lobbyist

Robert C. Jubelirer (born February 9, 1937, Altoona, Pennsylvania) is a Republican political leader in Pennsylvania. He served as a member of the Pennsylvania State Senate from 1975 to 2006. He served as President pro tempore of the Pennsylvania State Senate for all but two years from 1984 to 2006, and served as the 29th lieutenant governor of Pennsylvania between 2001 and 2003.

Jubelirer was defeated for re-nomination in the 2006 Republican party primary election and left office on November 30, 2006.

== Early life ==
The son of a prominent county judge, Jubelirer attended Pennsylvania State University and the Dickinson School of Law. He was admitted to the bar in Blair County, Pennsylvania and practiced law for several years before entering politics.

He was elected to the Pennsylvania State Senate in 1974 to represent the Altoona area. He was elected Majority Leader in 1981. Jubelirer served as President Pro Tempore of the Senate from 1985 to 1992. After serving briefly as Minority Leader from 1992 to 1994, he again became President Pro Tempore.

In a 2002 PoliticsPA Feature story designating politicians with yearbook superlatives, he was named the "Hardest Working."

== Lieutenant governor ==
When Pennsylvania Governor Tom Ridge resigned on October 5, 2001 to become President Bush's Homeland Security Advisor, Lt. Governor Mark Schweiker ascended to the governorship.

By provision of the Pennsylvania Constitution of 1968, Jubelirer as President Pro Tempore was automatically elevated to Lt. Governor and sworn in the same day. Jubelirer's elevation to the office was not without controversy, as he retained his position in the Pennsylvania State Senate. Critics and political foes argued that this violated the separation of powers principle and threatened the checks and balances guaranteed in the state constitution.

A lawsuit was filed by State Rep. John Lawless, Joseph Wiedemer and Leechburg Area School Board member Charles A. Pascal, Jr. to block Jubelirer's simultaneous service in the Senate and the executive branch, but the Pennsylvania State Supreme Court rejected the argument and issued a per curiam decision allowing Jubelirer to hold both offices simultaneously. Jubelirer continued in both offices until January 21, 2003 when Schweiker's term expired. He declined to accept the Lt. Governor's salary during his term.

== 2006 primary election defeat ==
In May 2006, Jubelirer was defeated in the Republican primary by Blair County Commissioner John Eichelberger. He, along with Chip Brightbill, the Senate majority leader, were the first top-ranking Pennsylvania legislative leaders to lose a primary election since 1964. The defeat was attributed primarily to his role in drafting a legislative pay raise bill in July 2005.

Jubelirer initially defended the raise. However, after internal polling showed his support falling, he opened discussion of a repeal of the unvouchered expense provision. However, newspapers reported that he tried to block efforts to repeal the entire raise. In the wake of the controversy, the Senator issued a statement in which he called the pay raise a "mistake" ... I apologized for it in my district. I now think it was the wrong thing to do. Hindsight is 20-20. I'm not shifting the blame to anybody. I accept the responsibility." He pledged to return the money he had received from the unvouchered expense account.

During the campaign, Jubelirer's more conservative challengers attacked him on abortion. Despite statements during the 2006 campaign that he was anti-abortion, Jubelirer's opposition to the Pennsylvania Abortion Control Act and a "pro-choice" rating by both the National Abortion Rights Action League and Planned Parenthood were used by opponents to counter his arguments. He told the Jewish Telegraphic Agency that he was "a pro-choice Republican" and that he did not support the Republican platform on abortion. Jubelirer's initial annual pension was $90,934.

Pennsylvania Senate, District 30: May 2006 Primary Election
Party	Candidate	Votes	%	±%
Republican	John Eichelberger	15,445	43.9	
Republican	Robert Jubelirer	12,662	36.0	
Republican	Arnold McClure	7,097	20.2	

== 2013 Pennsylvania State University Board of Trustees election ==
Jubelirer attempted a comeback of sorts, seeking a seat on the Pennsylvania State University Board of Trustees. Despite an endorsement from former Gov. Tom Ridge, Jubelirer finished a distant sixth place, failing to earn one of the three seats. He was elected to The Pennsylvania State University Board of Trustees in 2014.

== See also ==
- 2005 Pennsylvania General Assembly pay raise controversy
- Drew Crompton
- List of Pennsylvania state legislatures

Political offices
Preceded by Mark Schweiker	Lieutenant Governor of Pennsylvania; 2001–2003	Succeeded by Catherine Baker Knoll
Preceded by Henry Hager	President pro tempore of the Pennsylvania Senate; 1985–1992	Succeeded by Bob Mellow
Preceded by Bob Mellow	President pro tempore of the Pennsylvania Senate; 1994–2006	Succeeded by Joe Scarnati
Party political offices
Preceded by Henry Hager	Republican Leader of the Pennsylvania Senate; 1981–1984	Succeeded by John Stauffer
Preceded by Joseph Loeper	Republican Leader of the Pennsylvania Senate; 1992–1994	Succeeded by Joseph Loeper
Pennsylvania State Senate
Preceded by Stanley Stroup	Member of the Pennsylvania State Senate from the 30th district 1975–2006	Succeeded by John Eichelberger
