= F. Joseph Loeper =

American politician

Member of the Pennsylvania Senate from the 26th district
- In office January 2, 1979 – December 31, 2000
- Preceded by: John James Sweeney
- Succeeded by: Edwin Erickson

Republican Leader of the Pennsylvania Senate
- In office January 3, 1989 – November 18, 1992
- Preceded by: John Stauffer
- Succeeded by: Robert Jubelirer
- In office March 15, 1994 – December 31, 2000
- Preceded by: Robert Jubelirer
- Succeeded by: David Brightbill

Republican Whip of the Pennsylvania Senate
- In office January 4, 1983 – November 30, 1988
- Preceded by: John Stauffer
- Succeeded by: David Brightbill

Personal details
- Born: December 23, 1944 (age 81)
- Party: Republican
- Education: West Chester University
- Occupation: Lobbyist, former State Senator

F. Joseph "Joe" Loeper (born December 23, 1944) is an American politician who represented the 26th senatorial district from 1979 through 2000 in the Pennsylvania State Senate. He resigned his seat in 2000 after pleading guilty to falsifying tax documents.

== Early life ==
Loeper was born in Upper Darby, Pennsylvania, to F. Joseph and Isabel (Martin) Loeper. He attended West Chester University, where he was a member of the Alpha Phi Omega fraternity and received a Bachelor of Science degree in education in 1966. He was a teacher in the Lansdowne-Aldan school district (1966–1967) and the Upper Darby School District (1967–1968). He received a Master of Science degree from Temple University in 1970. In 1972, he became treasurer of the Upper Darby School Board.

== Political career ==
Loeper served as Republican Leader from 1989 through 2000, and as Senate Majority Leader from 1989 through 1992 and again from 1994 through 2000.

== Guilty plea ==
In 2000 he pleaded guilty in federal court of falsifying tax-related documents to conceal more than $330,000 in income he received from a private consulting firm while serving in the Senate. He resigned his senate seat on December 31, 2000, and was later released from federal prison at Fort Dix, New Jersey, after serving six months.

== Lobbying career ==
He is currently working as a lobbyist through his lobbying firm Loeper and Associates representing the Pennsylvania Turnpike, Drexel University, and others.

Party political offices
Preceded by John Stauffer	Republican Whip of the Pennsylvania Senate; 1983–1988	Succeeded by David Brightbill
Preceded by John Stauffer	Republican Leader of the Pennsylvania Senate; 1989–1992	Succeeded by Robert Jubelirer
Preceded by Robert Jubelirer	Republican Leader of the Pennsylvania Senate; 1994–2000	Succeeded by David Brightbill
Pennsylvania State Senate
Preceded by John James Sweeney	Member of the Pennsylvania Senate for the 26th District; 1979–2000	Succeeded by Edwin Erickson
