= Tim Kearney (politician) =

American politician and architect

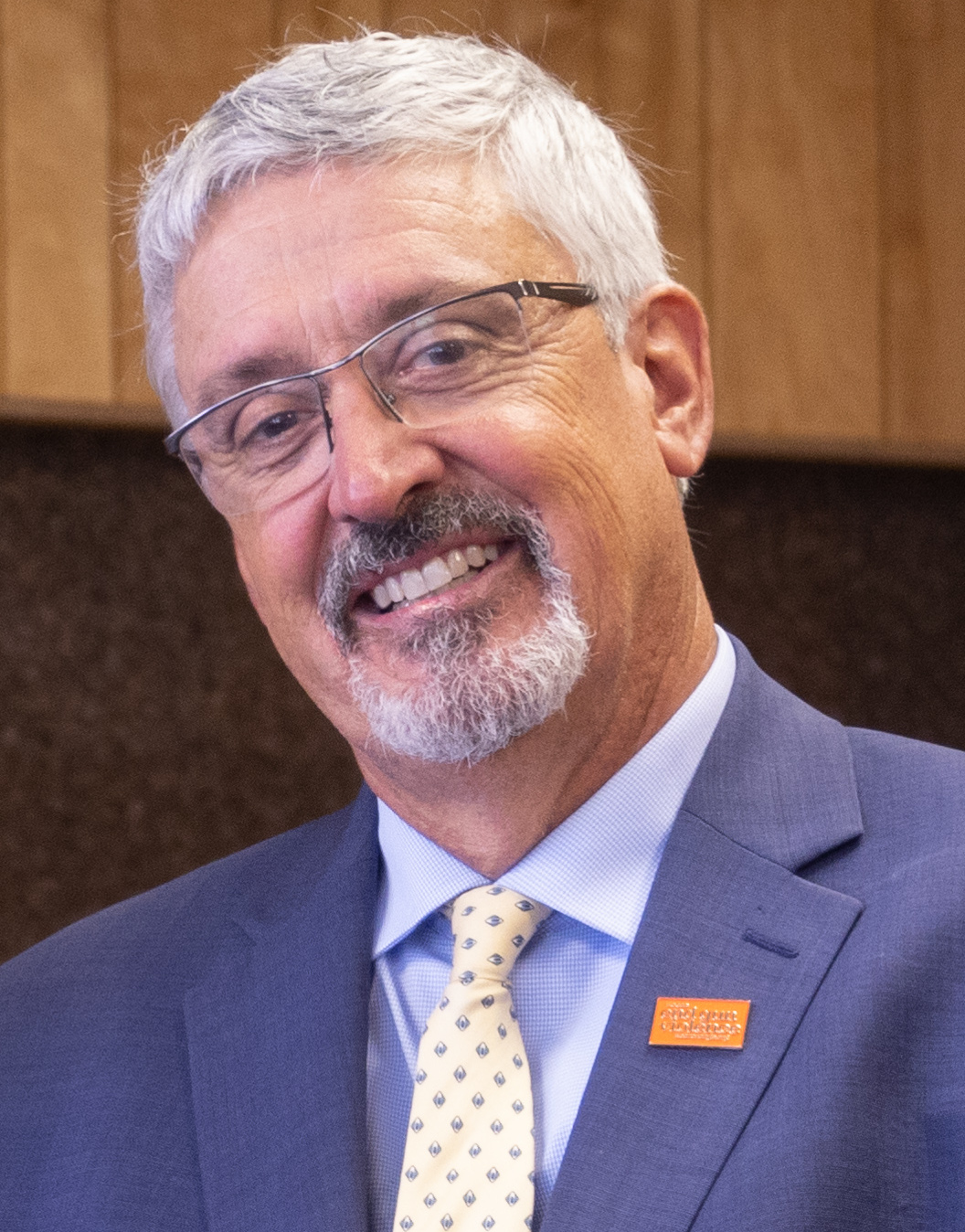

Member of the Pennsylvania Senate from the 26th district
- Incumbent
- Assumed office January 1, 2019
- Preceded by: Tom McGarrigle

Mayor of Swarthmore
- In office 2014 – January 1, 2019
- Preceded by: Richard Lowe
- Succeeded by: Marty Spiegel

Personal details
- Born: November 22, 1960 (age 65)
- Party: Democratic
- Education: Catholic University of America; University of Pennsylvania
- Occupation: Architect, professor
- Website: Official website

Timothy P. Kearney (born November 22, 1960) is an American politician and architect. He is a Democratic member of the Pennsylvania State Senate, representing the 26th District since 2019.

== Education and career ==
Kearney received a B.S. from the Catholic University of America and a M.Arch. from the University of Pennsylvania. He is an adjunct professor at Drexel University. He is also a partner in an architectural firm, along with his wife.

== Political career ==
Kearney served seven years on the planning commission for Swarthmore, Pennsylvania before being elected to two terms as mayor. In total, he served the borough for 12 years, focusing on environmental and social issues, including working towards making the borough more pedestrian-friendly.

In 2018, he defeated Republican Tom McGarrigle in an upset to become state senator and the first Democrat to represent the 26th district since 1978.

For the 2025-2026 Session Kearney serves on the following committees in the State Senate:

- Institutional Sustainability & Innovation (Minority Chair)
- Appropriations
- Education
- Local Government
- Transportation
