= Charles Lemmond =

American politician

Charles D. Lemmond, Jr.

Member of the Pennsylvania Senate from the 20th district
- In office November 20, 1985 – November 30, 2006
- Preceded by: Frank O’Connell
- Succeeded by: Lisa Baker

Personal details
- Born: January 17, 1929 Hazleton, Pennsylvania, US
- Died: May 30, 2012 (aged 83) Wilkes-Barre, Pennsylvania, US
- Party: Republican

Charles D. Lemmond Jr. (January 17, 1929 – May 30, 2012) was an American politician from Pennsylvania who served as a Republican member of the Pennsylvania State Senate for the 20th District from 1985 to 2006.

== Early life and education ==
Lemmond was born in Hazleton, Pennsylvania, to Charles D. and Ruth Zierdt Lemmond. He grew up and attended school in Forty Fort, Pennsylvania. He served in the U.S. Army and was stationed in Italy. He received an A.B. from Harvard University in 1952 and a LL.B. from the University of Pennsylvania Law School.

== Career ==
Lemmond worked as an assistant District Attorney in Luzerne County and in 1979 he was appointed by Governor Dick Thornburgh to fill a vacancy on the Luzerene County Court of Common Pleas. He served until 1981 when he lost the election to the judicial seat.

He served as a member of the Pennsylvania Senate for the 20th district from 1985 to 2006. He was a member of the Pennsylvania Higher Education Assistance Agency and the Joint Legislative Budget and Finance Committee.

He served on the Impeachment Trial Committee weighing the charges against Pennsylvania Supreme Court Justice Rolf Larsen. He sponsored legislation to implement hearing screenings for newborns.

== Death and legacy ==
Lemmond died on May 30, 2012, at a hospice in Wilkes-Barre, Pennsylvania.
