= Pennsylvania's 26th Senate district =

American legislative district

Pennsylvania's 26th State Senate district
Senator
Tim Kearney; D–Swarthmore
- Population (2021): 255,232

Pennsylvania State Senate District 26 includes part of Delaware County. It is currently represented by Democrat Tim Kearney.

== District profile ==
The district includes the following areas:

- Aldan
- Clifton Heights
- East Lansdowne
- Glenolden
- Lansdowne
- Marple Township
- Media
- Millbourne
- Morton
- Newtown Township
- Prospect Park
- Ridley Park
- Ridley Township
- Rutledge
- Springfield Township
- Swarthmore
- Upper Darby Township
- Upper Providence Township

== Senators ==
Representative	Party	Years	District home	Note	Counties
George B. Stevenson	Republican	1939–1962		Former Lock Haven mayor (1935–37) in Clinton County.	Cameron, Clarion, Clinton, Elk, Forest
Lyle G. Hall	Democratic	1963–1968			Cameron, Clarion, Clinton, Elk, Forest
Lyle G. Hall	Democratic	1965–1966			Clarion, Elk, Forest
Lyle G. Hall	Democratic	1967–1968			Delaware (part)
Clyde R. Dengler	Republican	1969–1974			Delaware (part)
John James Sweeney	Democratic	1975–1978			Delaware (part)
F. Joseph Loeper, Jr.	Republican	1979–2000		Resigned December 31, 2000.	Delaware (part)
Edwin B. Erickson	Republican	2001–2014		Elected March 20, 2001 to fill vacancy.	Delaware (part)
Edwin B. Erickson	Republican	2005–2014		Elected March 20, 2001 to fill vacancy.	Delaware (part), Chester (part)
Thomas J. McGarrigle	Republican	2015–2019			Delaware (part), Chester (part)
Tim Kearney	Democratic	2019–present		Incumbent	Delaware (part), Chester (part)

== Recent election results ==
PA Senate election, 2022
Party	Candidate	Votes	%
Democratic	Tim Kearney (incumbent)	65,675	59.9
Republican	Frank Agovino	44,045	40.1
Total votes		109,720	100.0
Democratic hold			

PA Senate election, 2018
Party	Candidate	Votes	%
Democratic	Tim Kearney	65,660	54.3
Republican	Thomas J. McGarrigle (incumbent)	55,287	45.7
Total votes		120,947	100.0
Democratic gain from Republican			

PA Senate election, 2014
Party	Candidate	Votes	%
Republican	Thomas J. McGarrigle	45,910	52.1
Democratic	John I. Kane	42,170	47.9
Total votes		88,080	100.0
Republican hold			

PA Senate election, 2010
Party	Candidate	Votes	%
Republican	Edwin Erickson (incumbent)	54,408	58.6
Democratic	Michael Farrell	38,413	41.4
Total votes		92,821	100.0
Republican hold			
