= Pennsylvania's 44th Senate district =

American legislative district

Pennsylvania's 44th State Senate district
Senator
Katie Muth; D–East Vincent Township
- Population (2021): 264,849

Pennsylvania State Senate District 44 includes parts of Berks County, Chester County, and Montgomery County. It is currently represented by Democrat Katie Muth.

== District profile ==
The district includes the following areas:

Berks County:

- Union Township
- Birdsboro

Chester County:

- Atglen
- Caln Township
- Charlestown Township
- East Brandywine Township
- East Coventry Township
- East Nantmeal Township
- East Pikeland Township
- East Vincent Township
- East Whiteland Township
- Elverson
- Honey Brook
- Honey Brook Township
- North Coventry Township
- Parkesburg
- Phoenixville
- Sadsbury Township
- Schuylkill Township
- South Coventry Township
- Spring City
- Upper Uwchlan Township
- Uwchlan Township
- Wallace Township
- Warwick Township
- West Brandywine Township
- West Caln Township
- West Nantmeal Township
- West Pikeland Township
- West Sadsbury Township
- West Vincent Township

Montgomery County:

- Lower Providence Township
- Royersford
- Upper Providence Township

== Senators since 1939 ==
Representative	Party	Years	District home	Note	Counties
John M. Walker	Republican	1939–1954			Allegheny (part)
Theodore H. Schmidt	Democratic	1955–1958			Allegheny (part)
Hospeh D. Ripp	Democratic	1959–1962			Allegheny (part)
Jack E. McGregor	Republican	1963–1970			Allegheny (part)
Thomas M. Nolan	Democratic	1971–1972			Allegheny (part)
Thomas M. Nolan	Democratic	1973–1978			Westmoreland (part)
Frank A. Pecora	Republican	1979–1982			Westmoreland (part)
Frank A. Pecora	Republican	1983–1992			Allegheny (part), Westmoreland (part)
Frank A. Pecora	Democratic	1992–1994		Switched party in 1992	Berks (part), Chester (part), Lehigh (part), Montgomery (part)
James W. Gerlach	Republican	1995–2002			Berks (part), Chester (part), Lehigh (part), Montgomery (part)
John C. Rafferty, Jr.	Republican	2003–2019			Berks (part), Chester (part), Montgomery (part)
Katie Muth	Democratic	2019–present			Berks (part), Chester (part), Montgomery (part)

== Recent election results ==
PA Senate election, 2022
Party	Candidate	Votes	%
Democratic	Katie Muth (incumbent)	70,626	55.7
Republican	Jessica Florio	56,279	44.3
Total votes		126,905	100.0
Democratic hold			

PA Senate election, 2018
Party	Candidate	Votes	%
Democratic	Katie Muth	62,692	52.0
Republican	John Rafferty Jr. (incumbent)	57,943	48.0
Total votes		120,635	100.0
Democratic gain from Republican			

PA Senate election, 2014
Party	Candidate	Votes	%
Republican	John Rafferty Jr. (incumbent)	48,655	61.4
Democratic	Kathi Cozzone	30,597	38.6
Total votes		79,252	100.0
Republican hold			

PA Senate election, 2010
Party	Candidate	Votes	%
Republican	John Rafferty Jr. (incumbent)	55,418	62.1
Democratic	Matt Stehman	33,802	37.9
Total votes		89,220	100.0
Republican hold			
