= Pennsylvania's 34th Senate district =

American legislative district

Pennsylvania's 34th State Senate district
Senator
Greg Rothman; R–Silver Spring Township
- Population (2021): 266,501

Pennsylvania State Senate District 34 includes parts of Cumberland County and Dauphin County and all of Perry County. It is currently represented by Republican Greg Rothman.

== District profile ==
The district includes the following areas:

Cumberland County

- Camp Hill
- Carlisle
- Cooke Township
- Dickinson Township
- East Pennsboro Township
- Hampden Township
- Hopewell Township
- Lower Frankford Township
- Lower Mifflin Township
- Middlesex Township
- Monroe Township
- Mount Holly Springs
- Newburg
- Newville
- North Middleton Township
- North Newton Township
- Penn Township
- Shippensburg (Cumberland County portion)
- Shippensburg Township
- Silver Spring Township
- South Middleton Township
- South Newton Township
- Southampton Township
- Upper Frankford Township
- Upper Mifflin Township
- West Pennsboro Township
- Wormleysburg

Dauphin County

- Berrysburg
- Elizabethville
- Gratz
- Halifax
- Halifax Township
- Jackson Township
- Jefferson Township
- Lykens
- Lykens Township
- Mifflin Township
- Millersburg
- Pillow
- Reed Township
- Rush Township
- Upper Paxton Township
- Washington Township
- Wayne Township
- Wiconisco Township
- Williams Township
- Williamstown

All of Perry County

== Senators ==
Representative	Party	Years	District home	Note	Counties
Daniel A. Bailey	Republican	1969 – 1970		Died June 4, 1970.	Cameron, Centre, Clearfield, Clinton
Joseph S. Ammerman	Democratic	1971–1972		Resigned January 4, 1977.	Cameron, Centre, Clearfield, Clinton
Joseph S. Ammerman	Democratic	1973–1977		Resigned January 4, 1977.	Cameron, Centre, Clearfield, Cambria (part), Mifflin (part)
Doyle Corman	Republican	1977–1978		Seated June 7, 1977.	Cameron, Centre, Clearfield, Cambria (part), Mifflin (part)
Doyle Corman	Republican	1983–1992		Seated June 7, 1977.	Cameron, Centre, Clinton, Mifflin, Clearfield (part), Mifflin (part)
Doyle Corman	Republican	1993–1998		Seated June 7, 1977.	Centre, Clinton, Juniata, Mifflin, Perry (part)
Jake Corman	Republican	1999–2002		Retired to run for governor	Centre, Clinton, Juniata, Mifflin, Perry (part)
Jake Corman	Republican	2003–2012		Retired to run for governor	Juniata, Perry, Centre (part), Mifflin (part), Union (part)
Jake Corman	Republican	2013–2023		Retired to run for governor	Centre, Juniata, Mifflin, Huntingdon (part)
Greg Rothman	Republican	2023–present			Cumberland (part), Dauphin (part), Perry

== Recent election results ==
PA Senate election, 2022: Pennsylvania Senate, District 34
Party	Candidate	Votes	%
Republican	Greg Rothman	74,238	63.54
Democratic	Jim Massey	42,598	36.46
Total votes		116,836	100.00
Republican hold			

PA Senate election, 2018: Pennsylvania Senate, District 34
Party	Candidate	Votes	%
Republican	Jake Corman (incumbent)	49,259	55.76
Democratic	Ezra Nanes	39,075	44.24
Total votes		88,334	100.00
Republican hold			

PA Senate election, 2014: Pennsylvania Senate, District 34
Party	Candidate	Votes	%
Republican	Jake Corman (incumbent)	Unopposed	
Total votes		46,391	100.00
Republican hold			

PA Senate election, 2010: Pennsylvania Senate, District 34
Party	Candidate	Votes	%
Republican	Jake Corman (incumbent)	53,822	69.43
Democratic	Jon Eich	23,697	30.57
Total votes		77,519	100.00
Republican hold			
