= Edwin Erickson =

American politician (1938–2019)

Edwin "Ted" Erickson
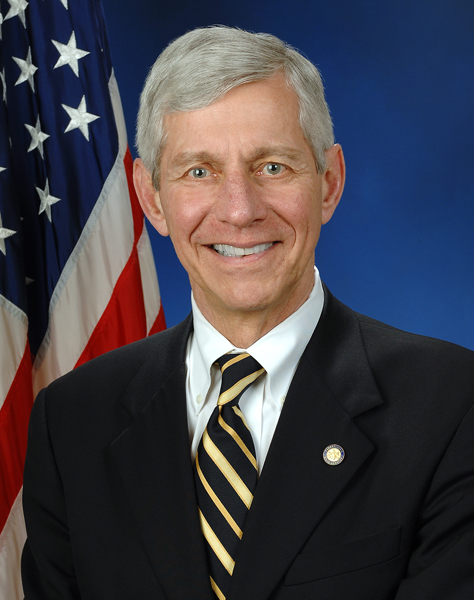

Member of the Pennsylvania Senate from the 26th district
- In office April 23, 2001 – January 2, 2015
- Preceded by: F. Joseph Loeper
- Succeeded by: Thomas J. McGarrigle

Personal details
- Born: May 18, 1938 Philadelphia, Pennsylvania, U.S.
- Died: January 8, 2019 (aged 80)
- Party: Republican
- Education: Albright College, Bryn Mawr College

Edwin B. Erickson III (May 18, 1938 – January 8, 2019) was an American politician. He served multiple terms on the Council of Delaware County, Pennsylvania, including two years as its chairman. He was later elected to the Pennsylvania Senate, representing the 26th District from 2001 to 2015. The district included most of Delaware County and parts of Chester County. From 1989 to 1992, Erickson served as a regional administrator of the U.S. Environmental Protection Agency for Region III, which encompassed several states in the Mid-Atlantic region.

== Biography ==
Erickson was born in Philadelphia on May 18, 1938. He earned a B.S. in biology and chemistry from Albright College in 1960, and taught general biology, anatomy and physiology, cell physiology and zoology at Drexel University and East Stroudsburg State College from 1962 to 1969. In 1969, he earned a Ph.D. in biochemistry and microbiology from Bryn Mawr College. From 1969 to 1973, he was tenured assistant professor of Biology at Hamilton College, where he taught microbiology, biochemistry and general biology. He was member of the Army Science Board, in which capacity he served as an advisor to the United States Army on scientific and technological matters.

Erickson served as director of Public Health and later the chief administrative officer (1976–82) of Upper Darby Township. He was elected to the Delaware County Council in 1982, and served as council chairman from 1987 to 1989. While serving on the council, he was known for being active in guiding the policy behind the Delaware County Regional Water Quality Control Authority, which served most of Delaware County.

== Pennsylvania Senate ==
On March 20, 2001, Erickson won a special election with 60% of the vote to the Pennsylvania Senate to fill the unexpired term of F. Joseph Loeper, who resigned after pleading guilty to falsifying tax documents. Erickson was seated on April 23, 2001. He represented the 26th District from 2001 to 2015, which included most of Delaware County and parts of Chester County. He was a member of the following caucuses: Arthritis Caucus, Autism Caucus, Biotechnology/Life Science Caucus, Delaware River Basin Caucus, Delaware River Port Caucus, Firefighter and Emergency Services Caucus, and Pro-Life Caucus. In addition, Senator Erickson served on the Local Government Commission, Pennsylvania Energy Development Authority, and Pennsylvania Higher Education Assistance Agency Board of Directors. He also served as the Majority Policy Chair from 2010 to 2014. Erickson was a key part of the enactment of the Taxpayer Relief Act of 2006, and also led efforts to pass the Alternative Energy Portfolio Standards Act. In 2013, Erickson announced that he would not run for reelection again. He spent his last term in office sponsoring, among other bills, a plan to create and expand community-based healthcare clinics within Pennsylvania. Erickson's last term in the Senate ended in January 2015.

== Later life ==
From 1989 to 1992, Erickson served as a regional administrator of the U.S. Environmental Protection Agency for Region III (Pennsylvania, Delaware, Maryland, Virginia, West Virginia and the District of Columbia). He was executive director of Delaware County from 1992 to 2001. Erickson died on January 8, 2019, at the age of 80. Delaware County flags were lowered to half-mast in his honor.

Pennsylvania State Senate
| Preceded by F. Joseph Loeper | Member of the Pennsylvania Senate for the 26th District; 2001–2015 | Succeeded by Thomas J. McGarrigle |
