= David J. Brightbill =

American politician (1942–2025)

David Brightbill

Member of the Pennsylvania Senate from the 48th district
- In office January 6, 1981 – November 30, 2006
- Preceded by: Clarence Manbeck
- Succeeded by: Mike Folmer

Republican Leader of the Pennsylvania Senate
- In office January 2, 2001 – November 30, 2006
- Preceded by: Joseph Loeper
- Succeeded by: Dominic Pileggi

Republican Whip of the Pennsylvania Senate
- In office January 7, 1997 – November 30, 2000
- Preceded by: Michael Fisher
- Succeeded by: Jeff Piccola
- In office January 2, 1989 – November 30, 1990
- Preceded by: Joseph Loeper
- Succeeded by: Michael Fisher

Personal details
- Born: November 3, 1942 Lebanon, Pennsylvania, U.S.
- Died: November 6, 2025 (aged 83)
- Party: Republican
- Spouse: Donna Brightbill
- Children: 3
- Education: Pennsylvania State University (BS); Duquesne University School of Law (JD)
- Occupation: Politician, attorney

David J. "Chip" Brightbill (November 3, 1942 – November 6, 2025) was an American attorney and politician who was the Majority Leader of the Pennsylvania State Senate. He was a member of the Republican Party.

== Early life and education ==
Born in Lebanon, Pennsylvania, on November 3, 1942, David J. Brightbill was a son of Jonathan and Verda (McGill) Brightbill. He attended the Pennsylvania Military College for two years before graduating from Pennsylvania State University in 1964. He then went on to obtain a Juris Doctor degree at Duquesne University School of Law in 1970.

== Legal and public service career ==
Brightbill served as the Lebanon County District Attorney from 1977 to 1981. Elected to the Pennsylvania Senate in 1982, he was then elected Majority Whip in 1989 and 1997 by the Republican caucus and became the Majority Leader in 2001 after Senator Joseph Loeper resigned in December 2000.

He served the 48th district, including all of Lebanon County, portions of Berks, Dauphin, and Lancaster Counties, and the Chester County borough of Elverson.

Brightbill was named runner up for the 2003 Politician of the Year by the political website PoliticsPA, who noted his growing influence in the 2003 budget negotiations.

He was defeated in the May 2006 Republican primary election by tire salesman Mike Folmer, receiving 36.8% of the vote. Brightbill's defeat was largely attributed to anger generated over a legislative pay raise vote in July 2005.

At the end of his term, Brightbill joined the Reading law firm of Stevens & Lee in their government affairs practice. Prior to joining Stevens & Lee, Brightbill had been a partner of Siegrist, Koller, Brightbill & Long for 30 years.

On May 19, 2007, he received an honorary doctorate degree from Elizabethtown College.

== Death ==
Brightbill died after a long illness on November 6, 2025, at the age of 83.

== See also ==
- 2005 Pennsylvania General Assembly pay raise controversy
- Pennsylvania State Senate

Party political offices
Preceded by Joseph Loeper	Republican Whip of the Pennsylvania Senate; 1989–1990	Succeeded by Michael Fisher
Preceded by Michael Fisher	Republican Whip of the Pennsylvania Senate; 1997–2000	Succeeded by Jeff Piccola
Preceded by Joseph Loeper	Republican Leader of the Pennsylvania Senate; 2001–2006	Succeeded by Dominic Pileggi
Pennsylvania State Senate
Preceded by Clarence Manbeck	Member of the Pennsylvania Senate for the 48th District; 1981–2006	Succeeded by Mike Folmer
