= Lisa Baker (Pennsylvania politician) =

American politician from Pennsylvania

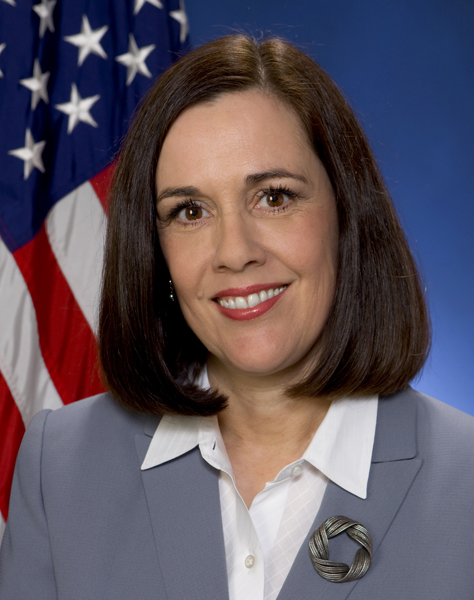

Member of the Pennsylvania Senate from the 20th district
- Incumbent
- Assumed office January 2, 2007
- Preceded by: Charles Lemmond

Personal details
- Born: Elisabeth Jones
- Party: Republican
- Spouse: Gary Baker (m. 1985)
- Children: 1
- Education: Shippensburg University of Pennsylvania (BA)
- Alma mater: Dallas High School

Elisabeth Baker (née Jones) is an American politician from Pennsylvania currently serving as a Republican member of the Pennsylvania State Senate from the 20th District since 2007. She chairs the Pennsylvania Senate Judiciary Committee.

== Education ==
Baker graduated from Dallas High School and received a bachelor's degree in Government Administration from Shippensburg University in 1983.

== Political career ==
Baker was first elected in 2006 beating Democrat Robert G. McNamara to represent the 20th Pennsylvania State Senate District and fill the seat of the retiring Charles Lemmond. She won reelection in 2010 and 2014 unopposed and was reelected again in 2018 beating Green Party challenger John Sweeney with 82% of the vote. Baker won re-election in 2022.

Baker currently serves on six committees, and is chair of the Judiciary Committee and vice-chair of the Labor and Industry Committee. Prior to her election as a State Senator, Baker worked on the staff of her predecessor, State Senator Charles Lemmond, and on the staff of Governors Tom Ridge and Mark Schweiker.

During her first term in office, Baker introduced legislation in response to the kids for cash scandal. Including proposals to aid the victims of the scandal and strengthening the juvenile justice system against such corruption.

Baker voted in favor of Act 76, which would have abolished school property taxes in Pennsylvania, and also opposes a severance tax on natural gas drillers. Baker voted against legalizing medical cannabis in Pennsylvania. Baker is also against legalizing adult-use cannabis in the state.

In 2019, Baker voiced concerns about due process and a proposed red flag law.

In 2022, she sponsored a bill (SB 1200) that would ban ballot drop boxes in Pennsylvania, as well another bill (SB 982) to ban private money from funding election operations. SB 982 was later enacted as 2022 Act 88.

=== Committee assignments ===
For the 2025-2026 Session Baker serves on the following committees in the State Senate:

- Judiciary (Chair)
- Banking & Insurance (Vice Chair)
- Communications & Technology
- Labor & Industry
- Veterans Affairs & Emergency Preparedness

In late 2022, Baker was made the Majority Caucus Administrator for the 2023-2024 legislative session.

- Judiciary, Chair
- Aging & Youth, Vice Chair
- Banking & Insurance
- Labor & Industry

== Personal life ==
Baker's parents are Edward W. Jones, II and Martha C. Jones, both of whom are deceased. Baker's ancestors, the Buckman family, arrived in Pennsylvania onboard the ship "The Welcome" in the year 1682 alongside William Penn. She married her husband Gary Baker on April 20, 1985. They currently live in Lehman Township with their son Carson. She is a member of the Gino J. Merli Veterans Center Advisory Board and a trustee of the independent day school Wyoming Seminary.
