= Pennsylvania's 48th Senate district =

American legislative district

Pennsylvania's 48th State Senate district
Senator
Chris Gebhard; R–North Cornwall Township
- Population (2021): 269,151

Pennsylvania State Senate District 48 includes parts of Berks County and Lancaster County and all of Lebanon County. It is currently represented by Republican Chris Gebhard.

== District profile ==
The district includes the following areas:

Berks County:

- Albany Township
- Bern Township
- Bernville
- Bethel Township
- Centerport
- Centre Township
- Greenwich Township
- Hamburg
- Heidelberg Township
- Jefferson Township
- Leesport
- Lenhartsville
- Lower Heidelberg Township
- Maidencreek Township
- Marion Township
- North Heidelberg Township
- Ontelaunee Township
- Penn Township
- Robesonia
- Shoemakersville
- South Heidelberg Township
- Tilden Township
- Tulpehocken Township
- Upper Bern Township
- Upper Tulpehocken Township
- Wernersville
- Windsor Township
- Womelsdorf

Lancaster County:

- Adamstown (Lancaster County portion)
- Brecknock Township
- Clay Township
- Denver
- East Cocalico Township
- West Cocalico Township

All of Lebanon County

== Senators ==
Representative	Party	Years	District home	Note	Counties
Richard Frame	Republican	1963–1964		Elected.	Warren, Venango
Richard Frame	Republican	1965–1966		Re-elected.	Venango
Richard Frame	Republican	1967–1968		Re-elected. Redistricted to the 25th district.	Lebanon, Berks (part), Lancaster (part)
Clarence Manbeck	Republican	1969–1972		Elected.	Lebanon, Berks (part), Lancaster (part)
Clarence Manbeck	Republican	1973–1976		Re-elected.	Lebanon (part), Berks (part), Lancaster (part)
Clarence Manbeck	Republican	1977–1980		Re-elected.	Lebanon (part), Berks (part), Lancaster (part)
Clarence Manbeck	Republican	1981–1982		Re-elected. Unknown departure reason.	Lebanon (part), Berks (part), Lancaster (part)
David J. Brightbill	Republican	1983–1986		Elected.	Lebanon, Berks (part), Lehigh (part)
David J. Brightbill	Republican	1987–1990		Re-elected.	Lebanon, Berks (part), Lehigh (part)
David J. Brightbill	Republican	1991–1994		Re-elected.	Lebanon, Berks (part), Lehigh (part)
David J. Brightbill	Republican	1995–1998		Re-elected.	Lebanon, Berks (part), Lehigh (part)
David J. Brightbill	Republican	1999–2002		Re-elected.	Lebanon, Berks (part), Lehigh (part)
David J. Brightbill	Republican	2003–2006		Re-elected. Lost primary election to Folmer.	Lebanon, Dauphin (part), Lancaster (part)
Mike Folmer	Republican	2007–2010	Lebanon	Elected.	Lebanon, Dauphin (part), Lancaster (part)
Mike Folmer	Republican	2011–2014	Lebanon	Re-elected.	Lebanon, Dauphin (part), Lancaster (part)
Mike Folmer	Republican	2015–2018	Lebanon	Re-elected.	Lebanon, Dauphin (part), York (part)
Mike Folmer	Republican	2019	Lebanon	Re-elected. Resigned on September 18, 2019, following his arrest on charges relating to his alleged possession of child pornography.	Lebanon, Dauphin (part), York (part)
Vacant		2019–2020		Special election held January 14, 2020, to determine Folmer's successor.	Lebanon, Dauphin (part), York (part)
Dave Arnold	Republican	2020–2021	Lebanon	Elected to complete Folmer's term. Died in office.	Lebanon, Dauphin (part), York (part)
Vacant		2021		Special election held May 18, 2021, to determine Arnold's successor.	Lebanon, Dauphin (part), York (part)
Chris Gebhard	Republican	2021–2022	North Cornwall Township	Elected to complete Arnold's term.	Lebanon, Dauphin (part), York (part)
Chris Gebhard	Republican	2023–present	North Cornwall Township	Re-elected.	Lebanon, Berks (part), Lancaster (part)
