= John Rafferty Jr. =

American politician (born 1953)

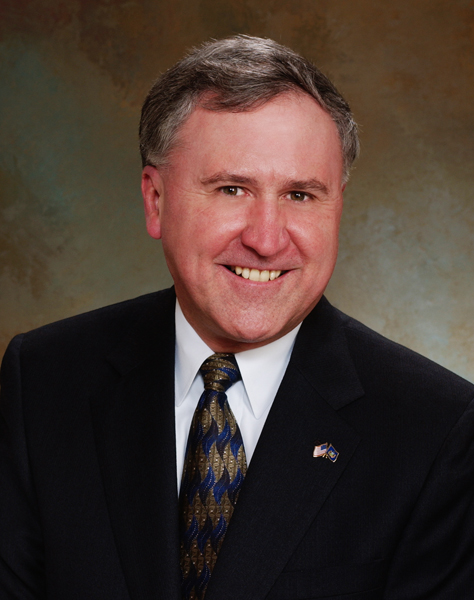

Member of the Pennsylvania State Senate from the 44th district
- In office January 7, 2003 – January 1, 2019
- Preceded by: Jim Gerlach
- Succeeded by: Katie Muth

Personal details
- Born: February 7, 1953 (age 73) Montgomery County, Pennsylvania, U.S.
- Party: Republican
- Education: University of Pittsburgh at Johnstown (BA); Beaver College (MA); Temple University (JD)
- Profession: Attorney
- Website: Official website

John Rafferty Jr. (born February 7, 1953) is an American politician and former Republican member of the Pennsylvania State Senate who had represented the 44th District from 2003 to 2019. He was the Republican nominee for Attorney General of Pennsylvania in 2016 but was defeated by Democrat Josh Shapiro. In 2018, he was defeated for re-election by Democrat Katie Muth.

== Career ==
Rafferty Jr. represented Pennsylvania's 44th senatorial district which includes parts of Berks, Chester and Montgomery Counties. He was re-elected for a fourth term in the Senate in November 2014.

Rafferty served as the Chairman of the Senate Transportation Committee. He also served as vice chairman of the Judiciary Committee and member of the Appropriations, Consumer Protection and Professional Licensure and Law and Justice Committees. Rafferty also previously served on the Pennsylvania Commission on Crime and Delinquency and in 2013 was appointed by the President Pro Tempore of the Senate to serve on the Pennsylvania Commission on Sentencing.

Prior to running for the Pennsylvania Senate, Rafferty served as an attorney in private practice focusing on education, real estate, zoning, business and estate law. As Deputy Attorney General for the Commonwealth from 1988 to 1991, he was assigned to the Criminal Law Division where his primary duty was investigating and prosecuting Medicaid fraud.

Rafferty was a member of the Methacton School Board from 1980 to 1984. He also represented Methacton in the operation of the Vo-Tech School as a member of the North Montco Vo-Tech Joint School Authority from 1981 to 1984. After serving on the Methacton School Board he was elected to serve as a member of the Lower Providence Township Board of Supervisors.

== Education ==
Rafferty attended the University of Pittsburgh at Bradford and completed his bachelor's degree at Pitt-Johnstown. He received a master's degree from Beaver College and his Juris Doctor from Temple University Beasley School of Law.

Pennsylvania State Senate
| Preceded by Jim Gerlach | Member of the Pennsylvania State Senate from the 44th district 2003–2019 | Succeeded by Katie Muth |
Party political offices
| Preceded by David Freed | Republican nominee for Attorney General of Pennsylvania; 2016 | Succeeded by Heather Heidelbaugh |
