= Pennsylvania's 42nd Senate district =

American legislative district

Pennsylvania's 42nd State Senate district
Senator
Wayne D. Fontana; D–Pittsburgh
- Population (2021): 250,536

Pennsylvania State Senate District 42 includes part of Allegheny County. It is currently represented by Democrat Wayne D. Fontana.

== District profile ==
The district includes the following areas:

Allegheny County:

- Avalon
- Bellevue
- Ben Avon
- Carnegie
- Crafton
- Dormont
- Emsworth
- Green Tree
- Ingram
- Kennedy Township
- McKees Rocks
- Millvale
- Mt. Lebanon Township
- Neville Township
- Pittsburgh [PART, Wards 01, 02, 03, 06, 09, 19, 20, 21, 22, 23, 24, 25, 26, 27, 28 and 32]
- Reserve Township
- Scott Township
- Stowe Township

== Senators ==
Representative	Party	Years	District home	Note	Counties
Thomas F. Lamb	Democratic	1969–1974		Died May 7, 2015	Allegheny (part)
Eugene F. Scanlon	Democratic	1975–1994		Died March 10, 1994	Allegheny (part)
Jack Wagner	Democratic	1994–2005		Seated May 24, 1994.	Allegheny (part)
Wayne D. Fontana	Democratic	2005–present		Elected May 17, 2005 to fill vacancy.	Allegheny (part)
