= Christine Tartaglione =

American politician (born 1960)

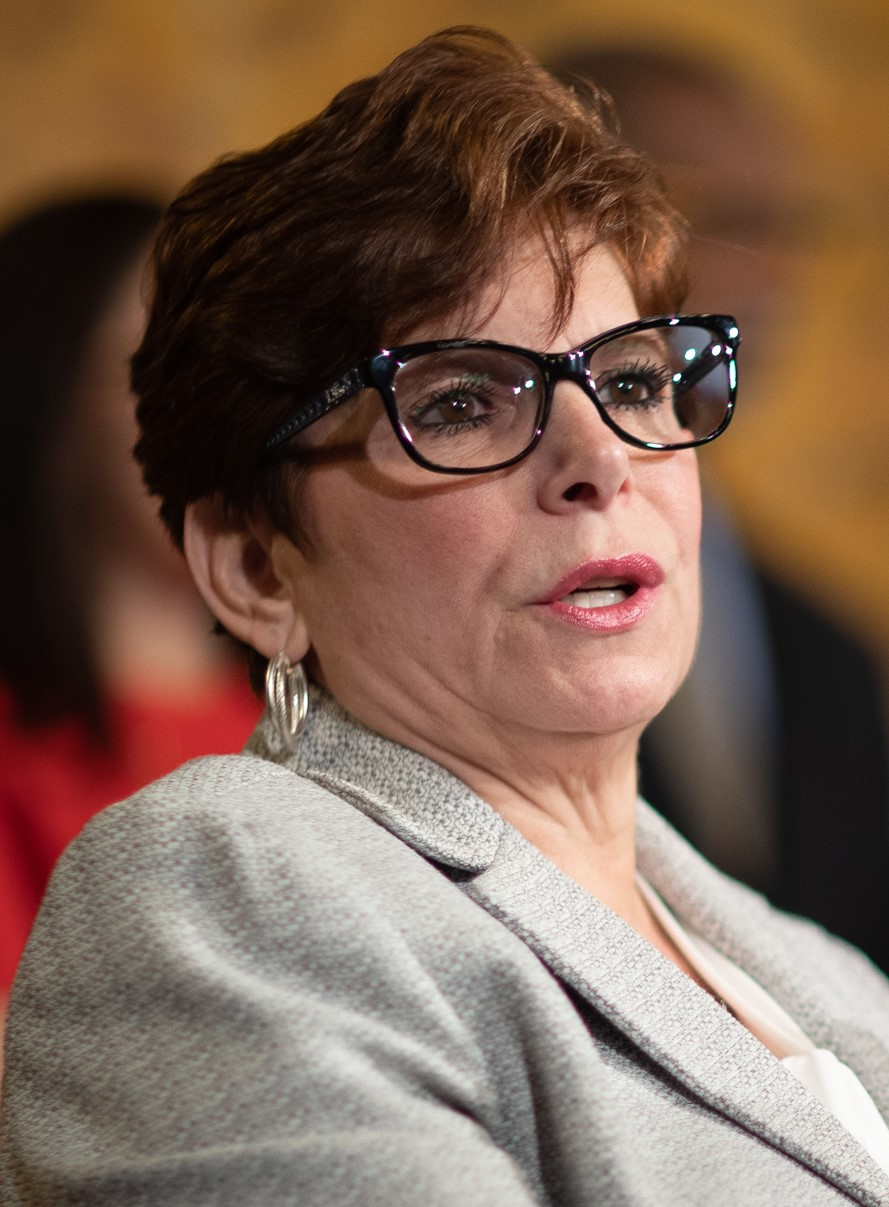

Member of the Pennsylvania Senate from the 2nd district
- Incumbent
- Assumed office January 3, 1995
- Preceded by: Bruce Marks

Chair of the Pennsylvania Democratic Party^{[a]}
- In office June 21, 1998 – June 22, 2002
- Preceded by: Mark Singel
- Succeeded by: Allen Kukovich

Personal details
- Born: September 21, 1960 (age 66) Philadelphia, Pennsylvania, U.S.
- Party: Democratic
- Parent: Margaret Tartaglione (mother)
- Education: Peirce College
- Website: Official website
- a. Acting Chairwoman from January 2, 1998 – June 21, 1998

Christine M. "Tina" Tartaglione (born September 21, 1960) is an American politician from Pennsylvania currently serving as a Democratic member of the Pennsylvania State Senate, representing the 2nd District since 1995. The district is located in lower Northeast Philadelphia.

== Early life and career ==
Christine Tartaglione was born in Philadelphia, Pennsylvania, to Eugene M. and Margaret (née Warenecki) Tartaglione. Her mother was a longtime political figure in Philadelphia, serving as a Democratic ward leader and city commissioner (1976–2011). She received her early education at the parochial school of St. Martin of Tours Church and later graduated from St. Basil Academy in 1978.

Tartaglione studied at Peirce College, from where she graduated maxima cum laude in 1980. She served as an assistant to Joan L. Krajewski, a member of the Philadelphia City Council, from 1986 to 1989. She then worked as a senior executive assistant to State Treasurer Catherine Baker Knoll from 1989 until 1992, when she became a business representative for the United Food and Commercial Workers, Local 1776.

== Political career ==
In 1992, Tartaglione unsuccessfully ran against Republican incumbent John Perzel for the Pennsylvania House of Representatives in the 172nd District. During the campaign, Perzel characterized her as a puppet for her mother while Tartaglione accused him of being out of touch with his constituents. Despite a Democratic registration advantage of about 2,000, she was defeated by more than 3,000 votes.

On March 1, 1994, Tartaglione announced her candidacy for the Pennsylvania State Senate in the 2nd District. During the campaign, she ran on a platform of increased gun control, better day care, racial and ethnic harmony, more jobs, and affordable housing. She defeated Harvey Rice, a lawyer supported by Mayor Ed Rendell and party chairman Bob Brady, in the Democratic primary. In the general election, she narrowly defeated Republican incumbent Bruce Marks by 393 votes. With her victory, she became the fifth woman elected to the State Senate in Pennsylvania.

Tartaglione has subsequently been re-elected to six more terms, never receiving less than 76% of the vote. She has served as Democratic chair of the Aging and Youth Committee, and is currently chair of the Senate's Philadelphia and Southeastern Pennsylvania delegations, as well as Democratic chair of the Labor and Industry Committee. She sponsored successful legislation that raised Pennsylvania's minimum wage, and was a leading advocate for the creation of the Office for People with Disabilities in the governor's office. She served as a delegate to the 2000 Democratic National Convention.

For the 2025-2026 Session, Tartaglione serves as the Minority Whip and sits on the following committees in the State Senate:

- Intergovernmental Operations (Minority Chair)
- Consumer Protection & Professional Licensure
- Labor & Industry
- Law & Justice
- Rules & Executive Nominations

=== Boating accident and recovery ===
During the Labor Day weekend of 2003, Tartaglione was severely injured when she fell on the deck of a small powerboat while off the Jersey Shore. A larger boat had whipped up a large wake which caused her boat to rock and resulted in her injuring her spinal cord and needing to use a wheelchair. After a number of surgeries and intense physical therapy, Tartaglione was able to walk for the first time in seven years to her seat in the Senate chambers at an October 2010 ceremony before her colleagues and well-wishers.
