= 2026 Pennsylvania Senate election =

- November 3, 2026

25 of 50 seats in the Pennsylvania State Senate 26 seats needed for a majority
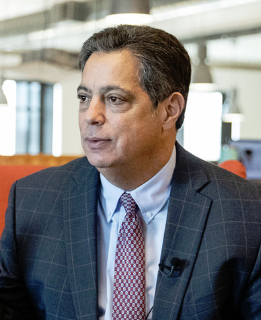

	Majority party	Minority party
Leader	Jay Costa	Joe Pittman
Party	Democratic	Republican
Leader since	January 4, 2011	November 30, 2022
Leader's seat	43rd–Forest Hills	41st–Indiana
Last election	10 seats, 45.59%	15 seats, 54.29%
Seats before	23	27
Seats won	16	9
Seats after	26	24
Seat change	▲3	▼3
Seats up	13	12
- Results by party Democratic gain Democratic hold Republican gain Republican hold No election
President Pro Tempore before election
Kim Ward
Republican
President Pro Tempore
TBD

Map of the incumbents by district. All senators ran for re-election and advanced to the general election.

The 2026 Pennsylvania Senate election was held on November 3, 2026. Voters elected half of the members of the Pennsylvania State Senate to serve a four-year term.

Democrats gained a net of three seats from the Republicans, narrowly giving them control of the State Senate, and a trifecta in Pennsylvania for the first time since 1993.

== Background ==
Republicans have controlled the Pennsylvania Senate since 1994, although Democrats have not won a majority of seats in the chamber since 1978. The state has been under divided government for much of this time, with Democrats often controlling the governorship and occasionally the House of Representatives. Since Democrats won control of the House in 2022, the Senate has become Republicans' primary force of opposition to Democratic policies. This has blocked Democratic governor Josh Shapiro from enacting many of the more liberal parts of his agenda. Shapiro and Democrats plan to invest heavily in winning control of the Senate to attempt to establish a government trifecta, both to have an easier time passing his agenda and potentially redistricting for the 2028 house elections. Republicans maintained their 28–22 majority in the 2024 election.

=== District 36 special election ===
Republican Senator Ryan Aument resigned in late 2024, leading to a special election in March 2025. Democrat James Malone won the election in an upset, despite the district having voted for Republican Donald Trump by 15 percentage points in the 2024 presidential election.

2025 District 36 special election
Party	Candidate	Votes	%
Democratic	James Andrew Malone	27,034	49.99
Republican	Josh Parsons	26,508	49.02
Libertarian	Zachary Moore	483	0.89
Write-in		52	0.10
Total votes		54,077	100.00
Democratic gain from Republican			

== Predictions ==
=== Statewide ===
Source	Ranking	As of
Sabato's Crystal Ball	Tossup	October 16, 2026
State Navigate	Lean D (flip)	August 27, 2026

=== Competitive districts ===
District	Incumbent	Last result	State Navigate (Note: Ratings simplified from percentages: <60% = "Tilt"; 60–75% = "Lean"; 75–95% = "Likely"; >95% = "Safe") Oct. 12, 2026
6th	Frank Farry	52.7% R	Lean D (flip)
16th	Jarrett Coleman	53.5% R	Lean D (flip)
24th	Tracy Pennycuick	51.5% R	Likely D (flip)
36th	James Malone	50.0% D	Tilt R (flip)
40th	Rosemary Brown	54.5% R	Tilt D (flip)
46th	Camera Bartolotta	100.0% R	Likely R
Overall			Dem – 26; Rep – 24

== Primary elections ==
=== Democratic primary ===
2026 Pennsylvania Senate elections Democratic Primary
District	Candidates	Votes	Percent
2	Christine Tartaglione	Unopposed	
4	Art Haywood	45,378	85.26%
4	Michael Cogbill	7,843	14.74%
6	Eileen Albillar	Unopposed	
8	Anthony H. Williams	27,182	84.42%
8	David S. Goldsmith Jr	5,018	15.58%
10	Steve Santarsiero	Unopposed	
12	Maria Collett	Unopposed	
14	Nick Miller	Unopposed	
16	Mark Pinsley	14,395	56.08%
16	Bradley Douglas Merkl-Gump	11,275	43.92%
18	Lisa Boscola	Unopposed	
20	Jackie Baker	Unopposed	
22	Marty Flynn	17,871	68.86%
22	Jeffrey Lake	8,083	31.14%
24	Christopher Thomas	Unopposed	
26	Tim Kearney	Unopposed	
28	Thomas Johnson	Unopposed	
30	Sean Steeg	Unopposed	
32	No candidate filed		
34	Nathan Wood	9,845	56.11%
34	Rich Forsman	7,701	43.89%
36	James Malone	Unopposed	
38	Lindsey Williams	Unopposed	
40	Brian Wrightson	Unopposed	
42	Wayne D. Fontana	23,919	71.94%
42	Paul Steenkiste	9,208	27.69%
44	Katie Muth	Unopposed	
46	Evan James Snyder (Note: Withdrew after primary election.)	Unopposed	
48	No candidate filed		
50	No candidate filed		

=== Republican primary ===
2026 Pennsylvania Senate elections Republican Primary
District	Candidates	Votes	Percent
2	No candidate filed		
4	Todd Johnson	Unopposed	
6	Frank Farry	Unopposed	
8	No candidate filed		
10	Gregory J. Bankos Jr.	Unopposed	
12	Robert F. Costello III	Unopposed	
14	Omy Juriel Maldonado	Unopposed	
16	Jarrett Coleman	Unopposed	
18	Scott Janney	Unopposed	
20	Lisa Baker	15,064	54.54%
20	Tyler Meyers	12,558	45.46%
22	Sharon Soltis	Unopposed	
24	Tracy Pennycuick	Unopposed	
26	Alfeia Devaughn-Goodwin	Unopposed	
28	Kristin Phillips-Hill	Unopposed	
30	Judy Ward	Unopposed	
32	Patrick Stefano	15,190	73.94%
32	Harry Young Cochran	5,354	26.06%
34	Greg Rothman	Unopposed	
36	Tom Jones	19,055	80.43%
36	Jere Swarr	4,636	19.57%
38	Thomas West	Unopposed	
40	Rosemary Brown	Unopposed	
42	No candidate filed		
44	Melissa C. Dicranian	Unopposed	
46	Camera Bartolotta	11,386	53.43%
46	Albert Michael Buchtan	9,925	46.57%
48	Chris Gebhard	18,178	67.38%
48	Clovis Crane	8,800	32.62%
50	Michele Brooks	Unopposed	

== General election ==
=== District breakdown ===
District	Party	Incumbent	Status	Party	Candidate	Votes	%
2	Democratic	Christine Tartaglione	Reelected	Democratic	Christine Tartaglione	38,998	100.0%
4	Democratic	Art Haywood	Reelected	Democratic	Art Haywood	103,620	88.2%
4	Democratic	Art Haywood	Reelected	Republican	Todd Johnson	13,827	11.8%
6	Republican	Frank Farry	Defeated	Democratic	Eileen Albillar	61,771	51.1%
6	Republican	Frank Farry	Defeated	Republican	Frank Farry	59,146	48.9%
8	Democratic	Anthony H. Williams	Reelected	Democratic	Anthony H. Williams	74,460	100.0%
10	Democratic	Steve Santarsiero	Reelected	Democratic	Steve Santarsiero	82,221	64.2%
10	Democratic	Steve Santarsiero	Reelected	Republican	Gregory J. Bankos Jr.	45,832	35.8%
12	Democratic	Maria Collett	Reelected	Democratic	Maria Collett	81,902	66.2%
12	Democratic	Maria Collett	Reelected	Republican	Robert F. Costello III	41,721	33.8%
14	Democratic	Nick Miller	Reelected	Democratic	Nick Miller	54,741	62.5%
14	Democratic	Nick Miller	Reelected	Republican	Omy Juriel Maldonado	32,833	37.5%
16	Republican	Jarrett Coleman	Defeated	Democratic	Mark Pinsley	63,536	51.3%
16	Republican	Jarrett Coleman	Defeated	Republican	Jarrett Coleman	60,315	48.7%
18	Democratic	Lisa Boscola	Reelected	Democratic	Lisa Boscola	67,988	65.0%
18	Democratic	Lisa Boscola	Reelected	Republican	Scott Janney	36,607	35.0%
20	Republican	Lisa Baker	Reelected	Republican	Lisa Baker	65,910	61.4%
20	Republican	Lisa Baker	Reelected	Democratic	Jackie Baker	41,518	38.6%
22	Democratic	Marty Flynn	Reelected	Democratic	Marty Flynn	58,460	65.6%
22	Democratic	Marty Flynn	Reelected	Republican	Sharon Soltis	30,610	34.4%
24	Republican	Tracy Pennycuick	Defeated	Democratic	Christopher Thomas	63,073	54.3%
24	Republican	Tracy Pennycuick	Defeated	Republican	Tracy Pennycuick	50,875	43.8%
24	Republican	Tracy Pennycuick	Defeated	Green	Michael Schonewolf Jr	2,134	1.8%
26	Democratic	Tim Kearney	Reelected	Democratic	Tim Kearney	70,646	68.5%
26	Democratic	Tim Kearney	Reelected	Republican	Gail Scott (Note: Republican nominee Alfe Goodwin withdrew and was replaced on the ballot by Scott.)	32,424	31.5%
28	Republican	Kristin Phillips-Hill	Reelected	Republican	Kristin Phillips-Hill	65,546	61.4%
28	Republican	Kristin Phillips-Hill	Reelected	Democratic	Thomas Johnson	41,136	38.6%
30	Republican	Judy Ward	Reelected	Republican	Judy Ward	63,357	72.3%
30	Republican	Judy Ward	Reelected	Democratic	Sean Steeg	24,263	27.7%
32	Republican	Patrick J. Stefano	Reelected	Republican	Patrick J. Stefano	60,512	70.8%
34	Republican	Greg Rothman	Reelected	Republican	Greg Rothman	65,030	56.9%
34	Republican	Greg Rothman	Reelected	Democratic	Nathan Wood	49,351	43.1%
36	Democratic	James Malone	Defeated	Republican	Tom Jones	65,325	54.5%
36	Democratic	James Malone	Defeated	Democratic	James Malone	54,579	45.5%
38	Democratic	Lindsey Williams	Reelected	Democratic	Lindsey Williams	73,941	63.7%
38	Democratic	Lindsey Williams	Reelected	Republican	Thomas West	42,100	36.3%
40	Republican	Rosemary Brown	Defeated	Democratic	Brian Wrightson	50,549	51.5%
40	Republican	Rosemary Brown	Defeated	Republican	Rosemary Brown	47,540	48.5%
42	Democratic	Wayne D. Fontana	Reelected	Democratic	Wayne D. Fontana	83,109	100.0%
44	Democratic	Katie Muth	Reelected	Democratic	Katie Muth	77,790	64.3%
44	Democratic	Katie Muth	Reelected	Republican	Melissa C. Dicranian	43,141	35.7%
46	Republican	Camera C. Bartolotta	Reelected	Republican	Camera C. Bartolotta	50,400	56.0%
46	Republican	Camera C. Bartolotta	Reelected	Independent	Jodie Borello	39,621	44.0%
48	Republican	Chris Gebhard	Reelected	Republican	Chris Gebhard	61,192	62.0%
50	Republican	Michele Brooks	Reelected	Republican	Michele Brooks	59,708	64.2%
