= 2022 Pennsylvania Senate election =

- November 8, 2022

All even-numbered seats in the Pennsylvania State Senate 26 seats needed for a majority
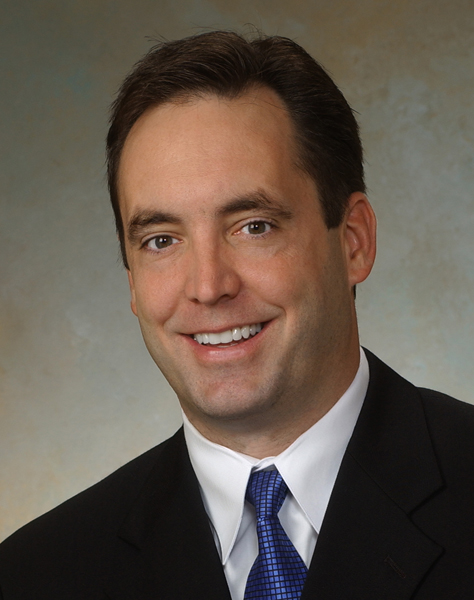

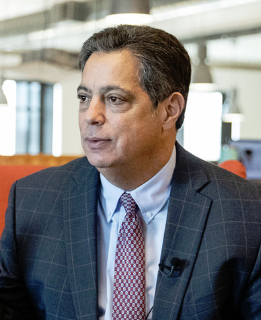
	Majority party	Minority party
Leader	Jake Corman (retired)	Jay Costa
Party	Republican	Democratic
Leader since	January 5, 2021	January 4, 2011
Leader's seat	34th	43rd
Last election	28 (Note: 29 seats were in the Republican caucus due to John Yudichak caucusing with the Republicans)	21
Seats won	13	12
Seats after	28	22
Seat change	Steady	▲1
Popular vote	1,190,410	1,140,567
Percentage	51.03%	48.89%
	Third party
Party	Independent
Last election	1
Seats won	0
Seats after	0
Seat change	▼1
- Democratic gain Democratic hold Republican hold No election Republican: 50–60% 60–70% 70–80% >90% Democratic: 50–60% 80–90% >90%
President Pro Tempore before election
Kim Ward
Republican
President Pro Tempore
Kim Ward
Republican

The 2022 elections for the Pennsylvania State Senate were held on November 8, with 25 of 50 districts being contested. The term of office for those elected in 2022 would begin when the Senate convenes in January 2023. Pennsylvania State Senators are elected for four-year terms, with half of the seats up for election every two years. The election coincided with the 2022 United States Senate election in Pennsylvania, United States House of Representatives elections, and the election of the entirety of the Pennsylvania House of Representatives.

Republicans had controlled the chamber since the 1994 election (28 years).

== Special elections ==
=== 5th senatorial district ===
In the 2021 elections, Democratic state senator John Sabatina was elected as a judge on the Court of Common Pleas in Philadelphia and resigned his seat on December 31. On January 10, Democrats selected ward leader Shawn Dillon as their nominee. Republicans selected Sam Oropeza. Shawn Dillon withdrew from the race after facing a legal challenge due to missing candidate filing paperwork, he was replaced on the ballot by his younger brother and School District of Philadelphia grant compliance monitor Jimmy Dillon. A special election was held on May 17; Dillon won with nearly 57% of the vote.

2022 Pennsylvania Senate, District 5 special election
Party	Candidate	Votes	%
Democratic	Jimmy Dillon	17,339	56.69
Republican	Sam Oropeza	13,246	43.31
Total votes		30,585	100.00
Democratic hold			

== Results summary ==
=== Redistricting ===
Due to redistricting after the 2020 United States census, senators were drawn into new districts.

=== Retiring incumbents ===
==== Democrats ====
No Democratic incumbents retired in this cycle.

==== Independents ====
1. District 14: John Yudichak retired.

==== Republicans ====
1. District 6: Tommy Tomlinson retired.
2. District 24: Bob Mensch retired.
3. District 34: Jake Corman retired to run for governor of Pennsylvania.
4. District 40: Mario Scavello retired.

=== Incumbents defeated in primary ===
==== Republicans ====
1. District 16: Pat Browne lost renomination to Jarrett Coleman.

== Primary elections ==
=== Democratic primary ===
2022 Pennsylvania Senate elections Democratic primary
District	Candidates	Votes	Percent
2	Christine Tartaglione	Unopposed	
4	Art Haywood	Unopposed	
6	Ann Mitchell	Unopposed	
8	Anthony H. Williams	19,201	60.06
8	Paul Prescod	12,767	39.94
10	Steve Santarsiero	Unopposed	
12	Maria Collett	Unopposed	
14	Nick Miller	8,844	42.37
14	Tara Zrinski	8,796	42.14
14	Yamelisa Taveras	3,234	15.49
16	Mark Pinsley	Unopposed	
18	Lisa Boscola	Unopposed	
20	Jaclyn Baker	Unopposed	
22	Marty Flynn	Unopposed	
24	Jill Dennin	17,442	73.86
24	Emanuel Wilkerson	6,173	26.14
26	Tim Kearney	Unopposed	
28	Judith McCormick Higgins	Unopposed	
30	Carol Taylor	Unopposed	
32	No candidate filed for party.		
34	James Massey Jr.	Unopposed	
36	No candidate filed for party.		
38	Lindsey Williams	Unopposed	
40	Jennifer Shukaitis	Unopposed	
42	Wayne D. Fontana	Unopposed	
44	Katie Muth	Unopposed	
46	No candidate filed for party.		
48	Calvin Clements	Unopposed	
50	Rianna Czech	Unopposed	

=== Republican primary ===
2022 Pennsylvania Senate elections Republican primary
District	Candidates	Votes	Percent
2	No candidate filed for party.		
4	No candidate filed for party.		
6	Frank Farry	Unopposed	
8	No candidate filed for party.		
10	Matthew McCullough	Unopposed	
12	Robert Davies	Unopposed	
14	Dean Browning	8,843	49.11
14	Cynthia Miller	5,395	29.96
14	Omy Maldonado	3,767	20.92
16	Jarrett Coleman	17,049	50.04
16	Pat Browne	17,025	49.96
18	John Merrhottein Jr.	Unopposed	
20	Elizabeth Baker	Unopposed	
22	No candidate filed for party.		
24	Tracy Pennycuick	21,007	70.41
24	David Moyer	8,827	29.59
26	Frank Agovino	Unopposed	
28	Kristin Phillips-Hill	Unopposed	
30	Judy Ward	Unopposed	
32	Patrick J. Stefano	Unopposed	
34	Greg Rothman	27,666	68.14
34	Michael Gossert	12,933	31.86
36	Ryan Aument	24,583	60.06
36	Michael Miller	16,345	39.94
38	Lori Mizgorski	15,845	67.82
38	Jacob Roberts	7,518	32.18
40	Rosemary Brown	Unopposed	
42	No candidate filed for party.		
44	Jessica Florio	Unopposed	
46	Camera Bartolotta	Unopposed	
48	Chris Gebhard	Unopposed	
50	Michele Brooks	Unopposed	

== General election ==
=== Predictions ===
Source	Ranking	As of
Sabato's Crystal Ball	Likely R	May 19, 2022

=== Overview ===
Statewide outlook
Affiliation	Candidates	Votes	%	Seats before	Seats up	Seats won	Seats after
Republican	22	1,190,410	51.03	28	13	13	28
Democratic	22	1,140,567	48.89	21	11	12 (▲1)	22
Libertarian	1	1,946	0.08	0	0	0	0
Independent	0	-	-	1	1	0 (▼1)	0
Total	45	2,332,923	100.00	50	25	25	50

=== Close races ===
Six district races had winning margins of less than 15%:

District	Winner	Margin
District 6	Republican	8%
District 14	Democratic (flip)	6.9%
District 16	Republican	8.3%
District 24	Republican	4%
District 38	Democratic	11%
District 40	Republican	11.4%
District 44	Democratic	11.2%

=== District breakdown ===
District	Party	Incumbent	Status	Party	Candidate	Votes	%
2	Democratic	Christine Tartaglione	Re-elected	Democratic	Christine Tartaglione	36,444	100.0
4	Democratic	Arthur L. Haywood III	Re-elected	Democratic	Arthur L. Haywood III	95,536	84.3
4	Democratic	Arthur L. Haywood III	Re-elected	Republican	Todd Johnson	17,749	15.7
6	Republican	Robert M. Tomlinson	Retired	Republican	Frank Farry	67,234	52.7
6	Republican	Robert M. Tomlinson	Retired	Democratic	Ann Marie Mitchell	57,012	44.7
6	Republican	Robert M. Tomlinson	Retired	Libertarian	Brandon Bentrim	1,946	1.5
8	Democratic	Anthony H. Williams	Re-elected	Democratic	Anthony H. Williams	63,437	85.8
8	Democratic	Anthony H. Williams	Re-elected	Republican	John Hayes	10,542	14.2
10	Democratic	Steve Santarsiero	Re-elected	Democratic	Steve Santarsiero	77,125	57.8
10	Democratic	Steve Santarsiero	Re-elected	Republican	Matthew McCullough	54,684	41.0
12	Democratic	Maria Collett	Re-elected	Democratic	Maria Collett	77,482	59.2
12	Democratic	Maria Collett	Re-elected	Republican	Rob Davies	52,022	39.8
14	Independent	John Yudichak	Retired	Democratic	Nick Miller	46,444	52.8
14	Independent	John Yudichak	Retired	Republican	Dean Browning	40,360	45.9
16	Republican	Pat Browne	Defeated in primary	Republican	Jarrett Coleman	68,238	53.5
16	Republican	Pat Browne	Defeated in primary	Democratic	Mark Pinsley	57,703	45.2
18	Democratic	Lisa Boscola	Re-elected	Democratic	Lisa Boscola	61,429	58.2
18	Democratic	Lisa Boscola	Re-elected	Republican	John Merhottein	42,828	40.6
20	Republican	Lisa Baker	Re-elected	Republican	Lisa Baker	75,599	67.0
20	Republican	Lisa Baker	Re-elected	Democratic	Jackie Baker	36,114	32.0
22	Democratic	Marty Flynn	Re-elected	Democratic	Marty Flynn	53,999	59.8
24	Republican	Bob Mensch	Retired	Republican	Tracy Pennycuick	62,883	51.5
24	Republican	Bob Mensch	Retired	Democratic	Jill Dennin	58,017	47.5
26	Democratic	Tim Kearney	Re-elected	Democratic	Tim Kearney	66,404	59.4
26	Democratic	Tim Kearney	Re-elected	Republican	Frank Agovino	44,195	39.6
28	Republican	Kristin Phillips-Hill	Re-elected	Republican	Kristin Phillips-Hill	74,665	65.6
28	Republican	Kristin Phillips-Hill	Re-elected	Democratic	Judith McCormick Higgins	36,338	31.9
30	Republican	Judy Ward	Re-elected	Republican	Judy Ward	76,844	75.4
30	Republican	Judy Ward	Re-elected	Democratic	Carol Taylor	24,043	23.6
32	Republican	Patrick J. Stefano	Re-elected	Republican	Patrick J. Stefano	76,496	74.5
34	Republican	Jake Corman	Retired to run for Governor	Republican	Greg Rothman	74,233	62.9
34	Republican	Jake Corman	Retired to run for Governor	Democratic	Jim Massey	42,595	36.1
36	Republican	Ryan P. Aument	Re-elected	Republican	Ryan P. Aument	91,710	100.0
38	Democratic	Lindsey Williams	Re-elected	Democratic	Lindsey Williams	69,839	55.0
38	Democratic	Lindsey Williams	Re-elected	Republican	Lori Mizgorski	55,808	44.0
40	Republican	Mario Scavello	Retired	Republican	Rosemary Brown	53,795	54.5
40	Republican	Mario Scavello	Retired	Democratic	Jennifer Shukaitis	43,557	44.1
42	Democratic	Wayne D. Fontana	Re-elected	Democratic	Wayne D. Fontana	85,905	100.0
44	Democratic	Katie Muth	Re-elected	Democratic	Katie Muth	70,782	55.0
44	Democratic	Katie Muth	Re-elected	Republican	Jessica Florio	56,341	43.8
46	Republican	Camera C. Bartolotta	Re-elected	Republican	Camera C. Bartolotta	78,289	100.0
48	Republican	Chris Gebhard	Re-elected	Republican	Chris Gebhard	74,120	67.7
48	Republican	Chris Gebhard	Re-elected	Democratic	Calvin Clements	34,263	31.3
50	Republican	Michele Brooks	Re-elected	Republican	Michele Brooks	75,823	70.7
50	Republican	Michele Brooks	Re-elected	Democratic	Rianna Czech	30,340	28.3

== See also ==
- 2022 Pennsylvania elections
- Elections in Pennsylvania
- List of Pennsylvania state legislatures
