= 2024 Pennsylvania Auditor General election =

- November 5, 2024
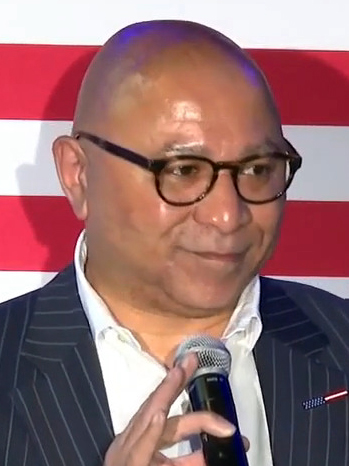

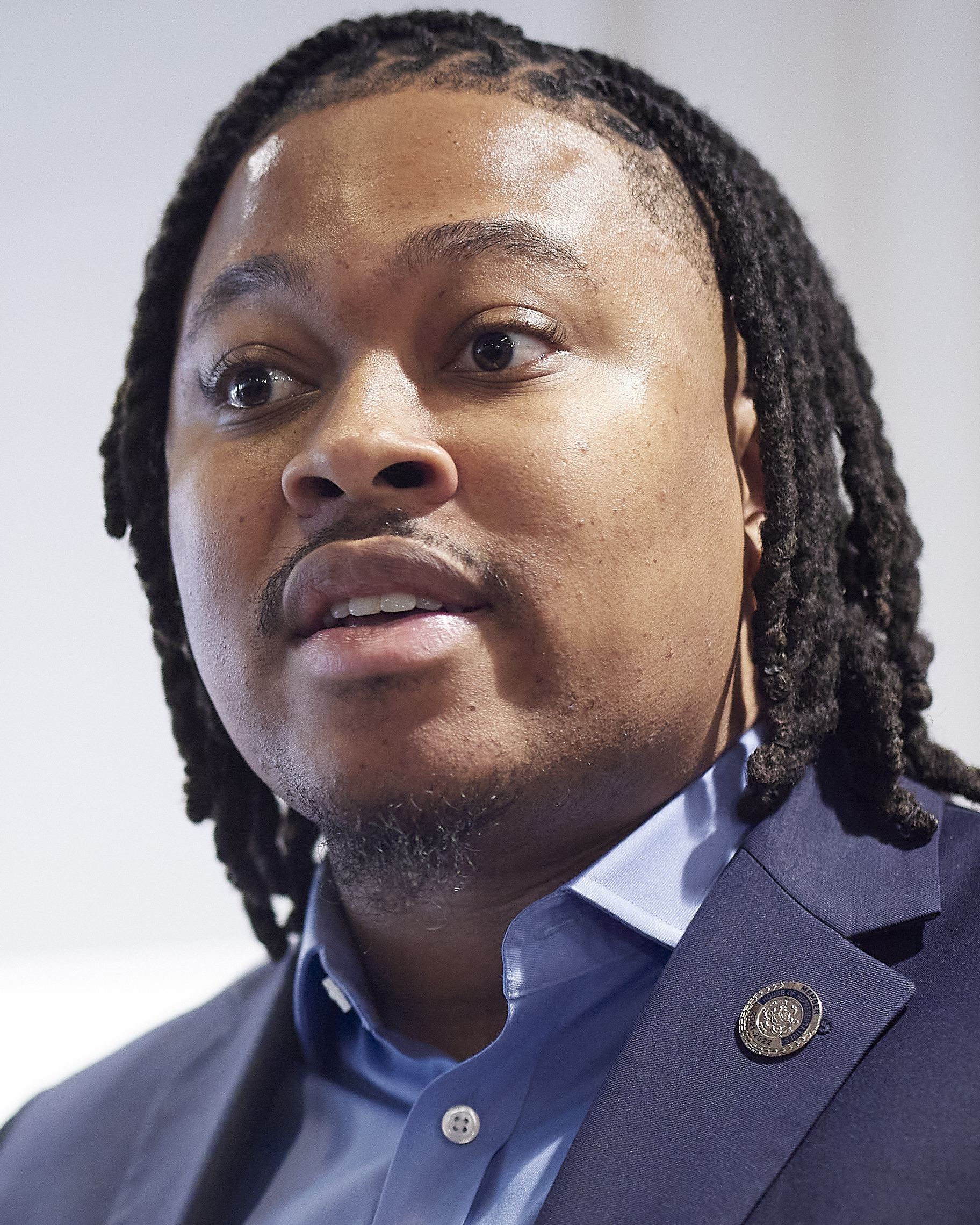
Nominee	Timothy DeFoor	Malcolm Kenyatta
Party	Republican	Democratic
Popular vote	3,489,652	3,135,412
Percentage	51.13%	45.94%
- DeFoor: 40–50% 50–60% 60–70% 70–80% 80–90% Kenyatta: 40–50% 50–60% 60–70% 70–80% 80–90%
Auditor General before election
Timothy DeFoor
Republican
Elected Auditor General
Timothy DeFoor
Republican

The 2024 Pennsylvania Auditor General election was held on November 5, 2024, to elect the Pennsylvania auditor general. Incumbent one-term Republican auditor general Timothy DeFoor won reelection defeating Malcolm Kenyatta.

DeFoor's re-election victory was attributed to his strong performance in conservative-rural areas and overperforming Donald Trump's margins in the Philadelphia suburbs. He became the first Republican Auditor General to win re-election since 1992. DeFoor carried Centre and Dauphin counties, both of which Kamala Harris won in the concurrent presidential election.

== Republican primary ==
=== Candidates ===
==== Nominee ====
- Timothy DeFoor, incumbent auditor general (2021–present)

=== Endorsements ===
Timothy DeFoor

Political parties

- Pennsylvania Republican Party

=== Results ===
Republican primary results
Party	Candidate	Votes	%
Republican	Timothy DeFoor (incumbent)	844,742	100.0%
Total votes		844,742	100.0%

== Democratic primary ==
=== Candidates ===
==== Nominee ====
- Malcolm Kenyatta, state representative for the 181st district (2019–present) and candidate for U.S. Senate in 2022

==== Eliminated in primary ====
- Mark Pinsley, Lehigh County controller and nominee for Pennsylvania's 16th Senate district in 2018 and 2022

==== Withdrawn ====
- Mark Rozzi, state representative for the 126th district (2013–present) and former Speaker of the Pennsylvania House of Representatives (January–February 2023) (endorsed Kenyatta)

=== Endorsements ===
Malcolm Kenyatta

U.S. Representatives

- Matt Cartwright, PA-8 (2013–2025)
- Madeleine Dean, PA-4 (2019–present)
- Dwight Evans, PA-8 (2016–present)
- Summer Lee, PA-12 (2023–present)
- Susan Wild, PA-7 (2018–2025)

State legislators

- Jay Costa, Minority Leader of the Pennsylvania State Senate (2011–present) from the 43rd district (1996–present)
- Joanna McClinton, Speaker of the Pennsylvania House of Representatives (2023–present) from the 191st district (2015–present)
- Mark Rozzi, state representative for the 126th district (2013–present) and former Speaker of the Pennsylvania House of Representatives (January–February 2023)

Local officials

- Ed Gainey, Mayor of Pittsburgh (2022–present)
- Paige Cognetti, Mayor of Scranton (2020–present)

Political parties

- Pennsylvania Democratic Party
- Working Families Party

Labor Unions

- AFSCME Council 13
- American Federation of Teachers
- Philadelphia Federation of Teachers
- United Food and Commercial Workers Local 1776

Organizations

- Human Rights Campaign
- LGBTQ Victory Fund

=== Results ===
Democratic primary results by county Kenyatta—80-90% Kenyatta—70-80% Kenyatta—60-70% Kenyatta—50-60% Tie—50% Pinsley—50-60% Pinsley—60-70% Pinsley—70-80%

Democratic primary results
Party	Candidate	Votes	%
Democratic	Malcolm Kenyatta	655,687	64.54%
Democratic	Mark Pinsley	360,182	35.46%
Total votes		1,015,869	100.0%

== Third parties ==
=== American Solidarity Party ===
==== Nominee ====
- Eric K. Anton

=== Constitution Party ===
==== Nominee ====
- Alan Goodrich

=== Libertarian Party ===
==== Nominee ====
- Reece Smith

== General election ==
=== Polling ===
Poll source	Date(s) administered	Sample size (Note: Key: A – all adults RV – registered voters LV – likely voters V – unclear)	Margin of error	Timothy DeFoor (R)	Malcolm Kenyatta (D)	Other	Undecided
ActiVote	October 4–25, 2024	400 (LV)	± 4.9%	52%	48%	–	–
ActiVote	September 6 – October 7, 2024	400 (LV)	± 4.9%	52%	48%	–	–
ActiVote	July 26 – August 23, 2024	400 (LV)	± 4.9%	48%	52%	–	–
GQR Research (D) (Note: Poll conducted for Kenyatta's campaign)	July 26–30, 2024	500 (LV)	± 4.4%	43%	47%	5% (Note: Libertarian candidate with 5%)	5%
Commonwealth Foundation	June 14–19, 2024	800 (RV)	± 3.5%	41%	43%	5%	11%

=== Results ===
2024 Pennsylvania Auditor General election
Party	Candidate	Votes	%	±%
Republican	Timothy DeFoor (incumbent)	3,489,652	51.13%	+1.69%
Democratic	Malcolm Kenyatta	3,135,412	45.94%	−0.41%
Libertarian	Reece Smith	123,628	1.81%	1.46%
Constitution	Alan (Bob) Goodrich	55,981	0.82%	N/A
American Solidarity	Eric K. Anton	20,989	0.31%	N/A
Total votes		6,825,662	100.00%	

==== By county ====
County	Timothy DeFoor Republican		Malcolm Kenyatta Democratic		Various candidates Other parties	
County	#	%	#	%	#	%
Adams	39,751	66.98%	17,482	29.46%	2,113	3.56%
Allegheny	278,483	40.00%	396,467	56.95%	21,192	3.05%
Armstrong	26,896	74.27%	8,133	22.46%	1,185	3.27%
Beaver	54,653	58.40%	35,573	38.01%	3,359	3.59%
Bedford	22,616	82.87%	3,934	14.42%	741	2.72%
Berks	109,141	55.01%	82,264	41.47%	6,986	3.52%
Blair	45,499	71.35%	16,289	25.55%	1,977	3.10%
Bradford	22,425	73.87%	6,826	22.49%	1,106	3.65%
Bucks	202,101	51.54%	179,888	45.87%	10,160	2.59%
Butler	78,879	66.54%	35,751	30.16%	3,915	3.30%
Cambria	47,005	67.50%	20,443	29.35%	2,194	3.15%
Cameron	1,615	73.95%	474	21.70%	95	4.34%
Carbon	22,287	65.74%	10,469	30.88%	1,144	3.38%
Centre	39,318	49.86%	37,309	47.32%	2,224	2.82%
Chester	147,269	45.91%	165,494	51.59%	7,997	2.49%
Clarion	14,218	74.99%	4,072	21.48%	671	3.54%
Clearfield	29,428	74.41%	8,855	22.39%	1,264	3.20%
Clinton	12,616	69.51%	4,978	27.43%	557	3.07%
Columbia	20,676	65.00%	9,914	31.17%	1,217	3.82%
Crawford	28,903	68.79%	11,569	27.53%	1,547	3.69%
Cumberland	83,375	57.26%	57,725	39.64%	4,518	3.11%
Dauphin	72,190	49.40%	69,196	47.35%	4,742	3.25%
Delaware	129,103	40.16%	185,035	57.56%	7,343	2.29%
Elk	12,083	71.58%	4,260	25.24%	538	3.19%
Erie	67,487	50.60%	60,903	45.66%	4,993	3.85%
Fayette	40,038	66.10%	18,853	31.12%	1,683	2.78%
Forest	1,850	71.21%	642	24.71%	106	4.08%
Franklin	58,453	71.24%	20,730	25.26%	2,871	3.50%
Fulton	6,806	85.26%	977	12.24%	198	2.51%
Greene	11,571	69.11%	4,627	27.63%	546	3.28%
Huntingdon	17,233	75.75%	4,805	21.12%	713	3.13%
Indiana	28,140	67.90%	11,910	28.74%	1,392	3.36%
Jefferson	17,769	78.51%	4,185	18.49%	680	3.01%
Juniata	9,453	79.92%	1,977	16.71%	398	3.37%
Lackawanna	51,380	46.00%	56,390	50.48%	3,930	3.51%
Lancaster	169,035	59.41%	107,063	37.63%	8,406	2.96%
Lawrence	29,724	64.69%	15,667	31.92%	1,559	3.40%
Lebanon	47,936	66.55%	21,593	29.98%	2,498	3.47%
Lehigh	88,658	48.17%	88,990	48.35%	6,417	3.49%
Luzerne	86,483	57.35%	59,329	39.35%	4,974	3.30%
Lycoming	41,379	70.37%	15,466	26.30%	1,954	3.32%
McKean	14,102	73.18%	4,506	23.38%	663	3.44%
Mercer	36,800	64.53%	18,343	32.16%	1,889	3.31%
Mifflin	16,753	77.48%	4,215	19.49%	653	3.01%
Monroe	40,743	48.97%	39,604	47.60%	2,849	3.43%
Montgomery	207,216	40.46%	292,109	57.04%	12,790	2.50%
Montour	6,037	62.23%	3,325	34.27%	339	3.50%
Northampton	87,025	50.90%	79,925	46.75%	4,013	2.35%
Northumberland	29,397	69.15%	11,555	27.18%	1,558	3.67%
Perry	19,090	75.57%	5,309	21.02%	861	3.40%
Philadelphia	129,936	19.28%	531,616	78.88%	12,389	1.84%
Pike	20,791	61.11%	12,150	35.71%	1,081	3.18%
Potter	7,173	80.57%	1,468	16.49%	262	2.95%
Schuylkill	49,457	69.04%	19,239	26.86%	2,940	4.10%
Snyder	14,520	74.01%	4,506	22.97%	592	3.02%
Somerset	31,087	77.22%	7,849	19.50%	1,322	3.29%
Sullivan	2,625	72.90%	843	23.41%	133	3.70%
Susquehanna	15,611	71.26%	5,410	24.69%	887	4.05%
Tioga	15,886	75.07%	4,375	20.67%	901	4.26%
Union	13,096	63.06%	7,124	34.30%	547	2.64%
Venango	18,319	69.61%	6,885	26.16%	1,114	4.24%
Warren	13,949	68.67%	5,500	27.07%	835	4.25%
Washington	72,929	61.63%	41,971	35.47%	3,425	2.89%
Wayne	19,560	68.34%	8,101	28.30%	962	3.37%
Westmoreland	129,421	63.38%	68,759	33.67%	6,022	2.95%
Wyoming	10,130	68.61%	4,119	27.90%	515	3.49%
York	154,074	63.12%	81,099	33.22%	8,921	3.65%
Totals	3,489,652	51.13%	3,135,412	45.94%	200,598	2.94%

Counties that flipped from Democratic to Republican

- Monroe (largest city: East Stroudsburg)

==== By congressional district ====
DeFoor won ten of 17 congressional districts.

District	DeFoor	Kenyatta	Representative
1st	51%	46%	Brian Fitzpatrick
2nd	30%	68%	Brendan Boyle
3rd	11%	88%	Dwight Evans
4th	43%	54%	Madeleine Dean
5th	37%	60%	Mary Gay Scanlon
6th	46%	51%	Chrissy Houlahan
7th	51%	46%	Susan Wild (118th Congress)
7th	51%	46%	Ryan Mackenzie (119th Congress)
8th	52%	44%	Matt Cartwright (118th Congress)
8th	52%	44%	Rob Bresnahan (119th Congress)
9th	68%	28%	Dan Meuser
10th	55%	42%	Scott Perry
11th	62%	35%	Lloyd Smucker
12th	40%	57%	Summer Lee
13th	72%	25%	John Joyce
14th	65%	32%	Guy Reschenthaler
15th	69%	28%	Glenn Thompson
16th	61%	35%	Mike Kelly
17th	48%	49%	Chris Deluzio

== See also ==
- 2024 Pennsylvania elections

== Notes ==
Partisan clients
