= Pennsylvania General Assembly =

Legislative branch of the state government of Pennsylvania

- Coat of arms

Type
- Type: Bicameral
- Houses: Senate; House of Representatives
- Term limits: None

History
- Founded: May 5, 1682
- Preceded by: Pennsylvania Provincial Assembly
- New session started: January 7, 2025

Leadership
- Senate President: Austin Davis (D) since January 17, 2023
- Senate President pro tempore: Kim Ward (R) since January 3, 2023
- House Speaker: Joanna McClinton (D) since February 28, 2023

Structure
- Seats: 253 voting members: 50 senators; 203 representatives
- Senate political groups: Majority: Republican (27); Minority: Democratic (23)
- House political groups: Majority: Democratic (103); Minority: Republican (100)
- Length of term: Senate: 4 years House: 2 years
- Salary: $102,844/year + per diem

Elections
- Senate voting system: First-past-the-post
- House voting system: First-past-the-post
- Last Senate election: November 3, 2026
- Last House election: November 3, 2026
- Next Senate election: 2028
- Next House election: 2028
- Redistricting: Politician commission

Motto
- Virtue, Liberty and Independence

Meeting place
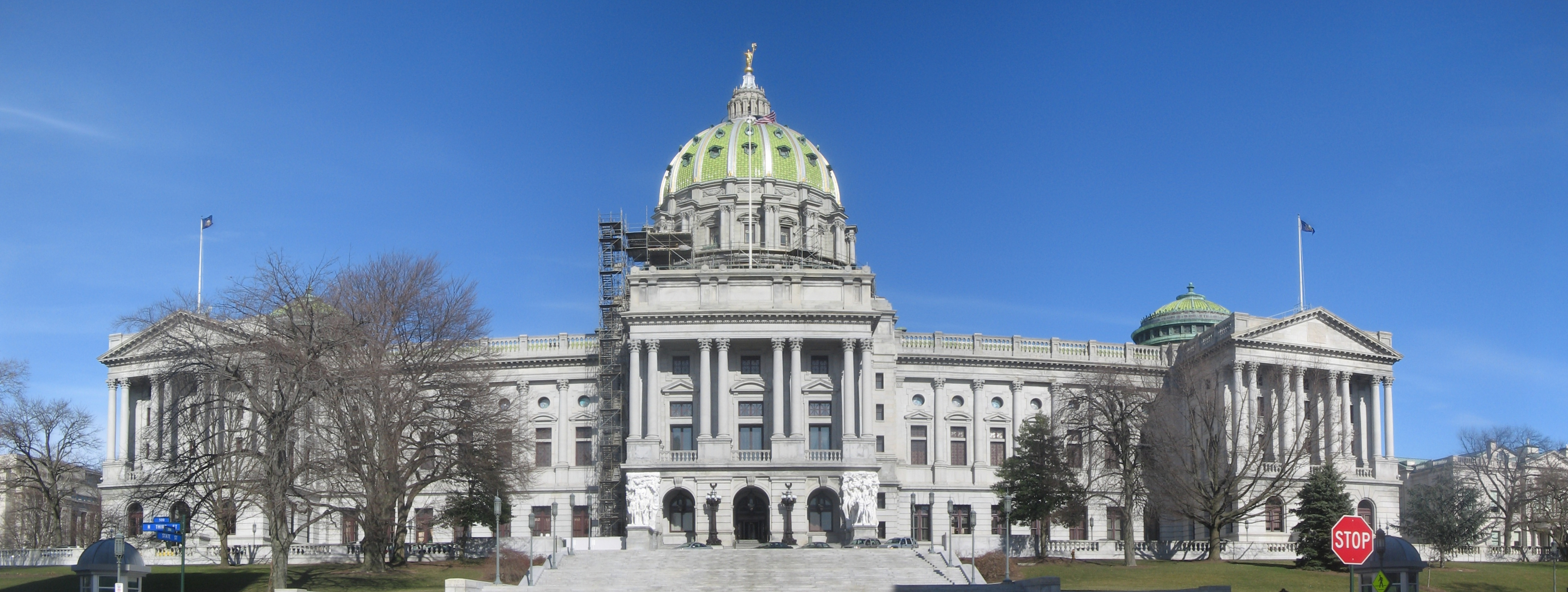
- Pennsylvania State Capitol; Harrisburg

Website
- Official website

Constitution
- Constitution of Pennsylvania

The Pennsylvania General Assembly is the state legislature of the Commonwealth of Pennsylvania. It is a bicameral body consisting of an upper house, the Pennsylvania State Senate, with 50 members, and a lower house, the Pennsylvania House of Representatives, with 203 members. The legislature convenes in the State Capitol building in Harrisburg.

During colonial times, the legislature was known as the Pennsylvania Provincial Assembly and was unicameral. Since the Constitution of 1776, the legislature has been known as the General Assembly. The General Assembly became a bicameral legislature in 1791.

== History ==
The Pennsylvania General Assembly has a lengthy history as one of the most openly corrupt state legislatures in the United States, going back over two centuries to the era of the Thirteen Colonies. In 1794, while visiting western Pennsylvania, Alexander Hamilton wrote to Rufus King: "The political putrefaction of Pennsylvania is greater than I had any idea of".

During the 19th century, the culture of corruption in the General Assembly got so bad that from 1866 to 1873, about 8,700 of 9,300 acts passed in that timeframe were local or special acts. The frustration of the people of the commonwealth with its legislature finally boiled over in 1871 and resulted in a 1873 constitutional convention and an 1874 constitutional amendment. One of the amendment's reforms was to prohibit the General Assembly from writing statutes covering more than one subject.

The amendment (today found at Section 3 of Article III of the Pennsylvania Constitution) was so poorly written that it prevented the General Assembly from undertaking a comprehensive codification of the commonwealth's statutes until another amendment was pushed through in 1967 to provide the necessary exception. This is why Pennsylvania remains the only state that has not yet completed a comprehensive codification of its general statutory law. Since 1970, Pennsylvania has been undertaking its first official codification process, resulting in the Pennsylvania Consolidated Statutes. With over 300 years of uncodified statutes to go through, the codification process is still not complete after over five decades of work.

== Legislative sessions ==
The General Assembly is a continuing body within the term for which its members are elected. It convenes at 12 o'clock noon on the first Tuesday of January each year and then meets regularly throughout the year. Both houses adjourn on November 30 in even-numbered years, when the terms of all members of the House and half the members of the Senate expire. Neither body can adjourn for more than three days without the consent of the other.

The governor may call a special session in order to press for legislation on important issues. As of 2017, only 35 special sessions have been called in the history of Pennsylvania.

The General Assembly meets in the Pennsylvania State Capitol in Harrisburg, which was completed in 1906. Under the Pennsylvania Constitution, the General Assembly must meet in the city of Harrisburg and can move only if given the consent of both houses.

== Membership ==
The General Assembly has 253 members, consisting of a Senate with 50 senators and a House of Representatives with 203 representatives, making it the second-largest state legislature in the nation, behind New Hampshire, and the largest full-time legislature.

Senators must be at least 25 years old, and representatives at least 21 years old. They must be United States citizens and residents of the state for a minimum of four years, and reside in their districts for at least one year. Individuals who have been convicted of felonies, including embezzlement, bribery, and perjury, are ineligible for election; the Constitution also adds the category of "other infamous crimes," which can be broadly interpreted by state courts. No one who has been previously expelled from the General Assembly may be elected.

Senators are elected for a term of four years, and representatives for two years. In Pennsylvania, general elections are held on the Tuesday after the first Monday in November in even-numbered years. A vacant seat must be filled by a special election, the date of which is set by the presiding officer of the respective house.

Legislative districts are drawn every ten years, following the United States census. They are drawn by a five-member commission, of which four members are the majority and minority leaders of each house (or their delegates). The fifth member, who chairs the commission, is appointed by the other four and may not be an elected or appointed official. If the leadership cannot decide on a fifth member, the Supreme Court of Pennsylvania may appoint him or her.

While in office, legislators may not hold civil office. Even if a member resigns, the Constitution states that the legislator may not be appointed to civil office for the duration of the term to which the legislator was elected.

== Leadership ==
=== Pennsylvania State Senate ===
President of the Senate: Austin Davis (D)
President pro tempore of the Senate: Kim Ward (R)

Majority Party (R)	Leadership Position	Minority Party (D)
Joe Pittman	Floor Leader	Jay Costa
Wayne Langerholc	Whip	Christine Tartaglione
Kristin Phillips-Hill	Caucus Chairperson	Maria Collett
Camera Bartolotta	Caucus Secretary	Steve Santarsiero
Scott Martin	Appropriations Committee Chairperson	Vincent Hughes
Lisa Baker	Caucus Administrator	Judy Schwank
Dave Argall	Policy Committee Chairperson	Nick Miller

=== Pennsylvania House of Representatives ===
Speaker of the House: Joanna McClinton (D)

Majority Party (D)	Leadership Position	Minority Party (R)
Matthew Bradford	Floor Leader	Jesse Topper
Michael Schlossberg	Whip	Tim O'Neal
Robert Matzie	Caucus Chairperson	Martina White
Tina Davis	Caucus Secretary	Clint Owlett
Jordan A. Harris	Appropriations Committee Chairperson	James Struzzi
Leanne Krueger	Caucus Administrator	Sheryl M. Delozier
Ryan Bizzarro	Policy Committee Chairperson	David H. Rowe

== See also ==
- 2006 Pennsylvania General Assembly bonus controversy
- 2005 Pennsylvania General Assembly pay raise controversy
- List of Pennsylvania state legislatures
