= Eileen Hartnett Albillar =

American politician

Member-elect of the Pennsylvania State Senate from the 6th district
- Assuming office January 2027
- Succeeding: Frank Farry

Personal details
- Party: Democratic

Eileen Hartnett Albillar is an American politician. A member of the Democratic Party, she is the member-elect for the 6th district of the Pennsylvania State Senate. She was previously the Bucks County Clerk of Courts.
