= Benjamin Champneys =

American politician

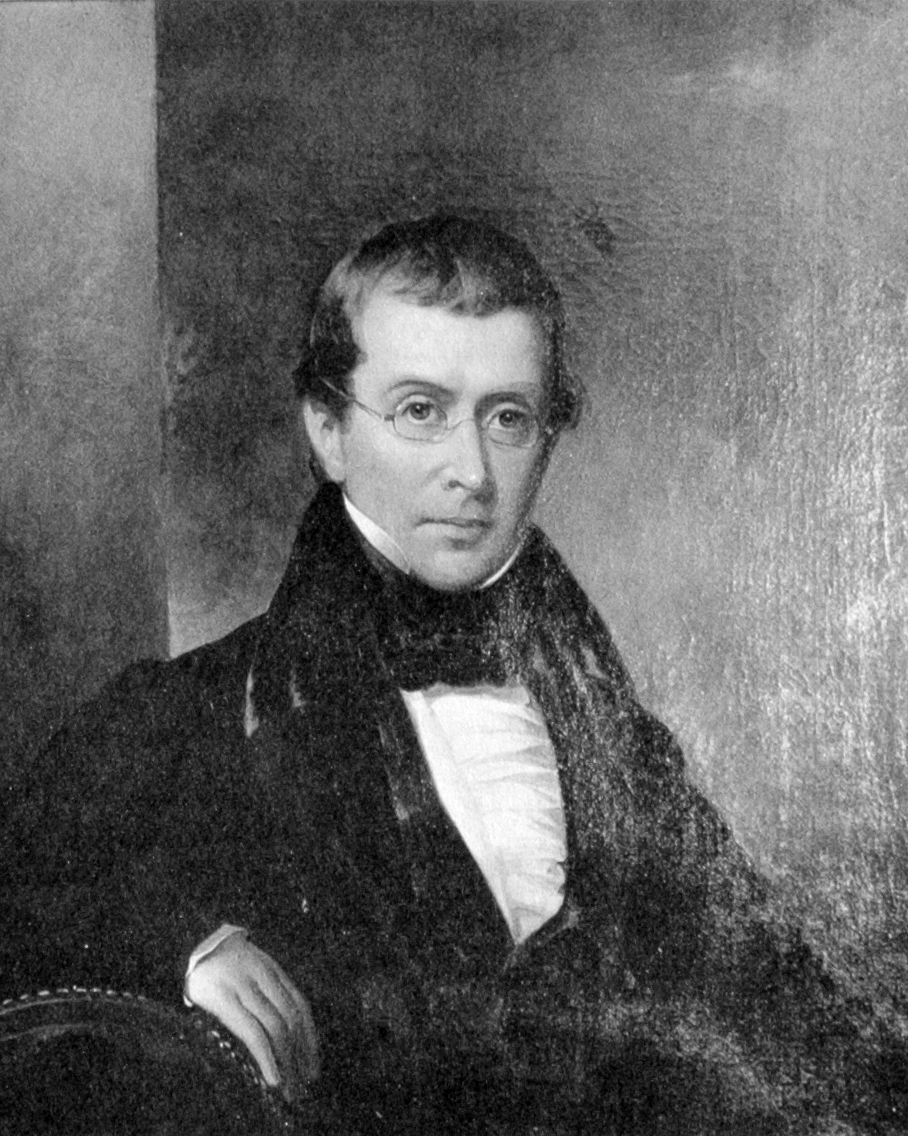
- Portrait by Jacob Eichholtz, c. 1830

Pennsylvania State Senator
- In office 1843 – 46, 1863 – 66

Pennsylvania State Representative
- In office 1825 – 26, 1828 – 29, 1863

Attorney General of Pennsylvania
- In office December 18, 1846 – July 31, 1848
- Governor: Francis R. Shunk
- Preceded by: John M. Read
- Succeeded by: James Cooper

Personal details
- Born: January , 1800 Bridgeton, New Jersey, U.S.
- Died: August 9, 1871 (aged 71) Lancaster, Pennsylvania, U.S.
- Spouse: Elizabeth Bachman
- Education: Princeton College
- Occupation: Judge, lawyer, legislator

Benjamin Champneys (January 1800 – August 9, 1871) was an American lawyer, politician and judge, who served as a Democratic member of the Pennsylvania House of Representatives, the Pennsylvania Senate and as Pennsylvania State Attorney General.

== Early life and education ==
Champneys was born in Bridgeton, New Jersey to Dr. Benjamin Champneys, a surgeon who served in the Navy, and Sarah Potter. His ancestors moved from England to the Province of New Jersey along with John Fenwick, the grantee of the province. The family lived in Bridgeton, New Jersey while Champneys attended Princeton College for two years, but moved upon the death of his father in 1814. He studied law in Trenton under Chief Justice Charles Ewing. He moved to Lancaster, Pennsylvania and completed his legal studies under Judge George Bryan Porter, the future Territorial Governor of Michigan. He was admitted to the Lancaster County bar in 1818.

== Career ==
Champneys worked as Deputy District Attorney for Mayor's Court from 1824 to 1830. He was elected as a Democratic member of the Pennsylvania House of Representatives in 1825 and 1828. He was appointed Deputy Attorney General for Lancaster County by Governor David R. Porter and served from 1830 to 1833. He served as President Judge of the Second Judicial District in 1839. He was elected to the Pennsylvania Senate for the 6th district and served from 1843 to 1845. He was appointed state Attorney General by Governor Francis R. Shunk and served from 1846 to 1848.

With the onset of the Civil War, he switched parties. In 1863, he served again in the Pennsylvania House of Representatives for Lancaster County. He served again in the Pennsylvania Senate for the 16th district from 1864 to 1865 and for the 17th district from 1865 to 1866.

He died in Lancaster, Pennsylvania.

== Personal life ==
Champneys married Elizabeth Bachman in 1821. A daughter, Elizabeth, would marry a same-named great-grandson of William Augustus Atlee.

Legal offices
Preceded by John M. Read	Attorney General of Pennsylvania; 1846–1848	Succeeded by James Cooper
Pennsylvania House of Representatives
Preceded by	Member of the Pennsylvania House of Representatives for Lancaster County; 1825-1826	Succeeded by
Preceded by	Member of the Pennsylvania House of Representatives for Lancaster County; 1828-1829	Succeeded by
Preceded by	Member of the Pennsylvania House of Representatives for Lancaster County; 1863	Succeeded by
Pennsylvania State Senate
Preceded by William Hiester	Member of the Pennsylvania Senate, 6th district 1843-1846	Succeeded by Josiah Rich
Preceded by John Andrew Hiestand	Member of the Pennsylvania Senate, 16th district 1863-1866	Succeeded by John M. Dunlap
