= John Strohm =

John Strohm may refer to:

- John Strohm (congressman) (1793–1884), American politician
- John Strohm (musician) (born 1967), American guitarist, singer, and lawyer
