= Elmer Warner =

American politician

Member of the Pennsylvania State Senate from the 14th district
- In office 1915–1919
- Preceded by: Miles C. Rowland
- Succeeded by: Wallace J. Barnes

Personal details
- Born: Elmer Ellsworth Warner; May 1, 1861 Tannersville, Pennsylvania
- Died: February 17, 1943 (aged 81) Weatherly, Pennsylvania
- Party: Republican
- Spouses: Harriet Learn (m. 1887; died 1890); Martha Kresge (m. 1892; died 1905); Gertrude Stull (m. 1906; died 1926)

Elmer Ellsworth Warner (May 1, 1861 – February 17, 1943) was a politician from Pennsylvania.
