= John Hiestand =

John Hiestand may refer to:

- John A. Hiestand (1824–1890), American politician from Pennsylvania
- John Hiestand (actor) (1907–1987), American actor and announcer
