= Dave Arnold (politician) =

American politician (1971–2021)

Member of the Pennsylvania Senate from the 48th district
- In office January 14, 2020 – January 17, 2021
- Preceded by: Mike Folmer
- Succeeded by: Chris Gebhard
- Constituency: Lebanon County and parts of Dauphin and York counties

District Attorney of Lebanon County
- In office December 2005 – January 2020
- Preceded by: Deirdre Eshleman
- Succeeded by: Pier Hess Graf

Personal details
- Born: December 7, 1971 Lebanon County, Pennsylvania, U.S.
- Died: January 17, 2021 (aged 49) Lebanon County, Pennsylvania, U.S.
- Party: Republican
- Spouse: Alicia Arnold
- Children: 1
- Education: Kutztown University of Pennsylvania; Widener University School of Law

David J. Arnold Jr. (December 7, 1971 – January 17, 2021) was a Pennsylvania state senator who represented the 48th district, which includes all of Lebanon County and portions of Dauphin and York counties. He was a member of the Republican Party and previously served as the district attorney of Lebanon County. Arnold was a senator from January 2020 until his death in January 2021.

== Early life and education ==
Arnold was a lifelong resident of Lebanon County, Pennsylvania and graduated from Cedar Crest High School in 1989. He later earned a criminal justice degree from Kutztown University of Pennsylvania. Soon after graduating from Widener University School of Law in 1996 with a JD degree, Arnold passed the bar exam.

== Career ==
After being an assistant district attorney in Lebanon County, Pennsylvania for four years, Arnold worked as a part-time public defender from January 2002 to September 2005, and in private practice before being elected in November 2005 as the district attorney of Lebanon County. His campaign spent more than three times that of his opponent, incumbent Deirdre Eshleman, whom he had easily beaten in the Republican primary though had enough write-in votes to appear on the Democratic ballot. Arnold narrowly won the November general election and was sworn in on December 30, 2005.

In 2006, Arnold joined then state attorney general Tom Corbett in a news conference to make known the formation of an elder abuse unit to crack down on scams and caregiver physical abuse against older citizens in the state. Arnold said his office had worked with state and federal authorities in a recent elder abuse case.

In 2007, Arnold's office and the Lebanon School District partnered to provide families with a child-security program, including software for creating a CD record of children's parent-chosen medical and other personal information for ready access in case of a crisis. The DA's office paid the program cost for each participant.

In 2011, Lebanon County commissioners approved Arnold's request for continuance of an alternate DUI sentencing program, wherein nonviolent offenders underwent a two-year treatment rather than going to jail.

Arnold was president of the Pennsylvania District Attorney's Association from 2016 to 2017.

=== Pennsylvania Senate ===
After Mike Folmer resigned as state senator from Pennsylvania's 48th district in September 2019, a special election to fill the position was scheduled for January 14, 2020. Arnold announced in early October 2019 that he was seeking the associated Republican nomination. Running against at least seven other Republicans, Arnold was chosen by a state Republican committee to be the party's nominee. He won the special election against Democratic nominee Michael Schroeder with nearly two-thirds of the vote. Arnold was sworn in to office on January 29, 2020.

The state senator salary is less than half of what Arnold had been making as a district attorney, and he planned to make up the difference with a side job in a private law practice, which other lawyer-legislators are reported to do. Arnold said his taking the job was not for monetary purposes, and that he would not sign up for the state's traditional pension plan, for which other new state employees are not eligible.

Arnold was one of 75 members of Pennsylvania's congressional delegation to sign a letter to the state's U.S. congress members on December 4, 2020, regarding an election review for the 2020 presidential election. The letter identifies election-related legal protections its signers believe were undermined, and asks that Congress "reject electoral votes that are not 'regularly given' or 'lawfully certified'", as they are enabled to do by federal law. Arnold signed another letter to the state's attorney general the same day that requested a review of state policies and procedures during the 2020 presidential election, and sought related reviews and recommendations.

== Illness and death ==
In late October 2019, Arnold was diagnosed with a malignant brain tumor and underwent successful surgery two days later at the Penn State Milton S. Hershey Medical Center to have it removed. According to a post on his campaign's Facebook page, additional treatment would be needed, and he would be off work and the campaign trail for a brief period after doctors had given him an excellent prognosis for full recovery. He died at his home on January 17, 2021, at age 49.

Political offices
Pennsylvania State Senate
Preceded by Mike Folmer	Member of the Pennsylvania Senate from the 48th district 2020–2021	Succeeded by Chris Gebhard
