= Thomas Kalman =

American politician

Thomas J. Kalman

Member of the Pennsylvania Senate from the 32nd district
- In office 1957–1970
- Preceded by: Eustace H. Bane
- Succeeded by: William E. Duffield

Personal details
- Born: December 21, 1917 Perryopolis, Pennsylvania, United States
- Died: June 9, 2012 (aged 94) Greensburg, Pennsylvania, United States

Thomas J. Kalman (December 21, 1917 – June 9, 2012) was a member of the Pennsylvania State Senate, serving from 1957 to 1970.
