= William J. Lane =

American politician

Member of the Pennsylvania Senate from the 46th district
- In office 1946–1970
- Preceded by: Wallace S. Gourley
- Succeeded by: Austin J. Murphy
- Constituency: Parts of Washington and Greene Counties

Personal details
- Born: February 7, 1905 Brownsville, Pennsylvania
- Died: July 1976 (aged 71) Brownsville, Pennsylvania
- Party: Democratic

William J. Lane (February 7, 1905 – July 1976) was a Democratic member of the Pennsylvania State Senate.

He was first elected to represent the 46th senatorial district in the Pennsylvania Senate in a special election on May 21, 1946. He held that position until 1970.
