= William E. Duffield =

American politician

Member of the Pennsylvania Senate from the 32nd district
- In office 1971–1978
- Preceded by: Thomas J. Kalman
- Succeeded by: J. William Lincoln

Personal details
- Born: January 7, 1922 Cherry Tree, Pennsylvania
- Died: January 14, 2001 (aged 79) Uniontown, Pennsylvania
- Children: Nancy Duffield Vernon
- Education: West Virginia University (BA); Harvard Law School (JD)

William Ewing Duffield (January 7, 1922 – January 14, 2001) was a member of the Pennsylvania State Senate, serving from 1971 to 1978.

Duffield placed two ghost employees on the payroll and mailed them paychecks. He was sentenced to six months in prison for 11 counts of mail fraud in 1981.
