= Christopher Thomas (Pennsylvania politician) =

American politician

Member-elect of the Pennsylvania State Senate from the 24th district
- Assuming office January 2027
- Succeeding: Tracy Pennycuick

Personal details
- Party: Democratic

Christopher Thomas is an American politician. A member of the Democratic Party, he is the member-elect for the 24th district of the Pennsylvania State Senate.
