= John Strohm (politician) =

American politician (1793–1884)

John Strohm (October 16, 1793 – September 12, 1884) was an American politician from Pennsylvania who served as a Whig member of the U.S. House of Representatives for Pennsylvania's 8th congressional district from 1845 to 1849.

== Early life ==
John Strohm was born in the part of Little Britain Township which formed the current Fulton Township to David and Ann Herr Strohm. He was home-schooled by his mother and encouraged to read newspapers and books.

When he was twelve, his family moved to Strasbugh Township where his parents had been raised. For the next four years, he worked on the family farm and attended school for only three to four months during the winter until he reached age 16. After completing school, he continued working on the farm until 1815, except for a three-month period in 1813 where he taught school.

In the fall of 1815, at age 22, he again taught school. This time it was in West Lampeter Township from 1815 to 1821, after which he resumed farming. He moved to Providence Township in 1833 and lived there for forty-nine years.

== Political career ==
In 1830, without his knowledge, friends attempted to nominate him for the state legislature. They were successful in the following year and he was elected, and twice re-elected, serving three consecutive one year terms. He was elected as an anti-mason.

In 1834, he was nominated and elected to the Pennsylvania Senate for the 6th district and served two four-year terms.

In 1845, he was elected to the United States Congress and served two two-year terms.

=== Political Office Chronology ===
- member of the Pennsylvania House of Representatives (1832 - 1834)
- member (Anti-Masonic) of the Pennsylvania State Senate from the 7th District (1835 - 1836)
  - chair of the Claims Committee (1836 - 1838)
- member (Anti-Masonic) of the Pennsylvania State Senate from the 6th District (1837 - 1842)
  - chair of the Claims Committee (1839)
  - chair of the Road, Bridges, and Inland Waterways Committee (1839)
  - chair of the Pensions and Gratuities Committee (1840 - 1841)
  - chair of the Improvement Committee (1841)
- speaker of the Pennsylvania State Senate in 1842.
- member (Whig) of the 29th United States Congress from the 8th District (1845 - 1846)
- member (Whig) of the 30th United States Congress from the 8th District (1847 - 1848)
- delegate to the 1848 Whig National Convention
- delegate to the 1852 Whig National Convention
- Justice of the Peace in Providence Township (1859 - 1880)
- delegate to the 1869 Pennsylvania Republican State Convention

=== Pennsylvania Senate Highlights ===
During his first term, Senator Strohm backed the chartering of the Second Bank of the United States as a state institution after its rechartering in the Bank War by the US Congress failed. The effort failed.

He supported Thaddeus Stevens's 1836 personal and property tax repeal and opposed the 1836 public school act.

In his second term, after the Buckshot War, he broke from his party as one of two dissenting votes that enabled Democrat Ebeneezer Kingsbury's passage of the 1840 tax-bill, which raised taxes at a time that the State was nearly insolvent. He also strongly advocated new revenue programs in support of the fledgling education system.

Strohm promoted freshman William Bigler's 1842 revenue-appropriations-bank bill. After Bigler spoke about his bill, Senator John Strohm prophetically said to Bigler: "Young man, that speech will make you Governor of Pennsylvania, if you behave yourself well hereafter." Bigler was elected governor in 1851.

=== Congressional Service ===
During his second term, he lived with Abraham Lincoln in a Washington, DC boarding house. Strohm was a pro-abolition Whig legislator. He retired from Congress in 1849.

== Post-Congressional Period ==
Strohm returned to Pennsylvania worked as a Surveyor and served as Justice of the Peace in Providence from 1859 through 1880.

Strohm was a member of the board of directors of the Strasburg Bank during its founding. He was also a member of the board of the Farmers' Mutual Insurance Company, being its secretary for thirty-six years and president for two years. He was president of the Big Spring and Beaver Valley Turnpike, and treasurer of the Providence Township School Board for six years.

In 1882, Strohm moved to Lancaster, Pennsylvania. He died there in 1884 at age 90 and was interred in the Mellinger Mennonite Cemetery in Lancaster.

== Personal life ==
Strohm was married in 1817 to Susannah Herr Barr, who died in 1832. After 23 years as a widower, he married Anne Witmer in 1857 after his time in Washington, DC.

Pennsylvania State Senate
Preceded by John Robinson	Member of the Pennsylvania Senate, 7th district 1835-1836	Succeeded by John Harper
Preceded by Paul Geiger	Member of the Pennsylvania Senate, 6th district 1837-1842	Succeeded by James A. Caldwell
U.S. House of Representatives
Preceded by Jeremiah Brown	Member of the U.S. House of Representatives from Pennsylvania's 8th congressional district 1845–1849	Succeeded by Thaddeus Stevens
