= Mark Pinsley =

Member-elect of the Pennsylvania State Senate from the 16th district
- Assuming office January 2027
- Succeeding: Jarrett Coleman

Personal details
- Party: Democratic

Mark Pinsley is an American politician and a member of the Democratic Party. In the 2026 Pennsylvania Senate election, he ran in the 16th district, and ultimately defeated Republican Jarrett Coleman, becoming the senator-elect for Pennsylvania's 16th Senate District.
