= Pat Browne =

American politician (born 1963)

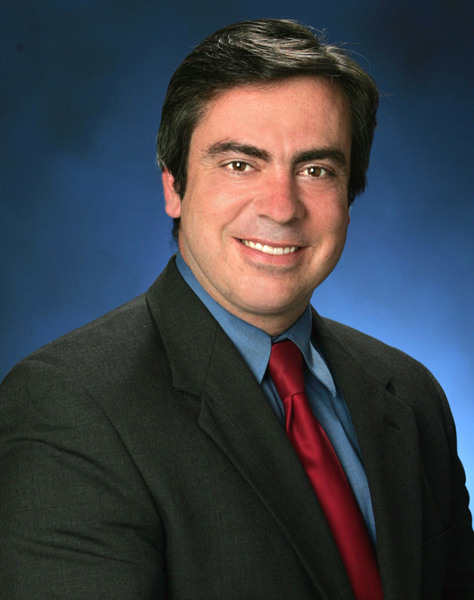

Secretary of Revenue of Pennsylvania
- Incumbent
- Assumed office June 29, 2023
- Governor: Josh Shapiro
- Preceded by: C. Daniel Hassell

Member of the Pennsylvania Senate from the 16th district
- In office May 3, 2005 – November 30, 2022
- Preceded by: Charlie Dent
- Succeeded by: Jarrett Coleman

Member of the Pennsylvania House of Representatives from the 131st district
- In office January 3, 1995 – May 3, 2005
- Preceded by: Karen Ritter
- Succeeded by: Karen Beyer

Personal details
- Born: December 8, 1963 (age 62) Allentown, Pennsylvania, U.S.
- Party: Republican
- Spouse: Heather Browne
- Education: University of Notre Dame; Temple University Law School
- Profession: Legislator – CPA – Attorney
- Website: http://www.senatorbrowne.com/

Patrick M. Browne (born December 8, 1963) is an American accountant, lawyer, and politician. A Republican, he served as a member of the Pennsylvania House of Representatives (1995–2005) and Pennsylvania Senate (2005–2022). On January 12, 2023, Democratic governor-elect Josh Shapiro nominated Browne to serve as secretary of revenue.

== Biography ==
Browne is a graduate of the University of Notre Dame and Temple University Law School. He is a graduate of Allentown Central Catholic High School.

Prior to his election to the State Senate, Browne worked as Certified Public Accountant and attorney. He also was a tax manager for Coopers and Lybrand from 1990 to 1994 and a tax supervisor for Price Waterhouse from 1986 to 1990.

Browne was a member of the Pennsylvania House of Representatives from 1994 to 2005. In 2005, he won a special election to fill the Senate seat vacated by Charlie Dent who resigned to take a seat in the United States House of Representatives.

Browne became Senate Appropriations Committee chairman in November 2014. He was also a member of the Communications & Technology, Education, Finance and Transportation Committees.

Browne has been arrested three times for DUI offenses, most recently in 2015 following a motorcycle accident resulting in a punctured lung. Browne's longtime campaign committee treasurer, Michael P. Ellwood, was arrested in September, 2019 on 179 criminal counts involving the embezzlement of $578K in campaign funds over 11 years.

Browne has been accused of corruption with regard to legislation he wrote in 2009 to give tax breaks to companies in a newly designated Neighborhood Improvement Zone in Allentown. His wife Heather was hired as a lobbyist with Harrisburg-based Pugliese Associates in 2010 and then quickly hired by multiple companies that benefited substantially from the NIZ provisions. Several beneficiaries of the NIZ have also made significant campaign contributions to Pat Browne, according to state records. Browne also pushed in 2013 to designate a City Revitalization and Improvement Zone in Bethlehem with similar tax breaks, and the same year Heather Browne was hired as a lobbyist by the biggest potential beneficiary of that fiscal arrangement.

In 2019 Browne announced that he had succeeded in diverting hundreds of millions of dollars of PennDOT funding to a project that will add another interchange on a rural stretch of Route 78, though he admitted that area residents oppose it. His stated purpose in advocating for the interchange was to allow businesses to build warehouses on cheap farmland in one of the few areas of the Lehigh Valley where until then they had not proliferated.

Browne narrowly lost renomination in the 2022 Republican primary to Parkland School Board member Jarrett Coleman, who defeated Browne by only 24 votes.

On January 12, 2023, Democratic governor-elect Josh Shapiro nominated Browne to serve as secretary of revenue. Brown took office on June 29, after the Pennsylvania State Senate failed to act within the constitutionally prescribed 25-legislative-day period.

== Family ==
Pat Browne is the older brother of the acclaimed fashion designer Thom Browne who designed past First Lady Michelle Obama's 2013 Inauguration day ensemble.
