= John A. Hiestand =

American politician (1824–1890)

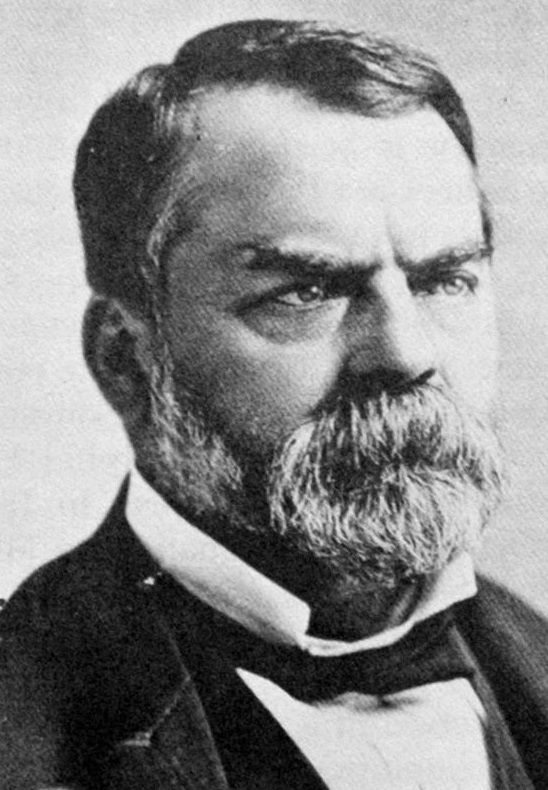
- Circa 1860. Pennsylvania State Senate (Harrisburg, PA).

Member of the U.S. House of Representatives from Pennsylvania's 9th district
- In office March 4, 1885 – March 3, 1889
- Preceded by: Abraham Herr Smith
- Succeeded by: David B. Brunner

Member of the Pennsylvania Senate for the 16th district
- In office 1861

Member of the Pennsylvania House of Representatives
- In office 1852-1853; 1856

Personal details
- Born: October 2, 1824 East Donegal Township, Pennsylvania, US
- Died: December 13, 1890 (aged 66) Lancaster, Pennsylvania, US
- Party: Republican
- Education: Pennsylvania College

John Andrew Hiestand (October 2, 1824 – December 13, 1890) was an American politician from Pennsylvania who served as a Republican member of the U.S. House of Representatives from Pennsylvania.

== Biography ==
John A. Hiestand was born in East Donegal Township, Pennsylvania. He attended the common schools, an academy in Marietta, Pennsylvania, and Pennsylvania College at Gettysburg, Pennsylvania. He studied law, was admitted to the bar in 1849 and commenced practice in Lancaster, Pennsylvania.

Hiestand was elected as a Whig to the Pennsylvania State House of Representatives in 1852, 1853, and 1856. He purchased an interest in the Lancaster Examiner in 1858 and relinquished the practice of law. He served in the Pennsylvania State Senate for the 16th district in 1861. He was an unsuccessful candidate in 1868 to Congress to fill the unexpired term of Thaddeus Stevens. He was appointed by President Ulysses Grant in 1871 naval officer at the port of Philadelphia. He was reappointed in 1875 and served until 1879.

Hiestand was elected as a Republican to the Forty-ninth and Fiftieth Congresses. He was an unsuccessful candidate for reelection in 1888. He died in Lancaster in 1890 and was interred in Marietta Cemetery, Marietta, Pennsylvania.

== Sources ==
- United States Congress. "John A. Hiestand (id: H000569)". Biographical Directory of the United States Congress.
- John Andrew Hiestand at The Political Graveyard

Pennsylvania House of Representatives
Preceded by	Member of the Pennsylvania House of Representatives; 1852-1853, 1856	Succeeded by
Pennsylvania State Senate
Preceded by William Hamilton	Member of the Pennsylvania Senate, 16th district 1861	Succeeded by Benjamin Champneys
U.S. House of Representatives
Preceded by A. Herr Smith	Member of the U.S. House of Representatives from Pennsylvania's 9th congressional district 1885–1889	Succeeded by David B. Brunner
