= Pennsylvania's 16th Senate district =

American legislative district

Pennsylvania's 16th State Senate district
Senator
Jarrett Coleman; R–Upper Macungie Township
- Population (2021): 265,055

Pennsylvania State Senate District 16 includes parts of Bucks County and Lehigh County. It is currently represented by Republican Jarrett Coleman.

== District profile ==
The district includes the following areas:

Bucks County

- Bedminster Township
- Bridgeton Township
- Dublin
- Durham Township
- East Rockhill Township
- Haycock Township
- Hilltown Township
- Milford Township
- Nockamixon Township
- Perkasie
- Quakertown
- Richland Township
- Richlandtown
- Riegelsville
- Sellersville
- Silverdale
- Springfield Township
- Telford (Bucks County portion)
- Tinicum Township
- Trumbauersville
- West Rockhill Township

Lehigh County

- Alburtis
- Allentown (PART, Wards 13 and 18)
- Coopersburg
- Heidelberg Township
- Lower Macungie Township
- Lower Milford Township
- Lowhill Township
- Lynn Township
- Macungie
- North Whitehall Township
- Slatington
- South Whitehall Township (PART, Districts 03, 06 and 08)
- Upper Macungie Township
- Upper Milford Township
- Upper Saucon Township
- Washington Township
- Weisenberg Township

== Senators ==
Representative	Party	Years	District home	Note
John Reed	Democratic-Republican Party	1815 – 1820		
Henry Allshouse	Democratic-Republican Party	1819 – 1826		
Alexander Mahon	Democratic-Republican Party	1821 – 1828		
Jesse Miller	Democratic	1827 – 1832		U.S. Representative for Pennsylvania's 13th district from 1833 to 1836
Charles B. Penrose	Whig	1833 – 1837		Was a Democratic-Republican from 1833 to 1835, and a Whig from 1835 to 1841 and a Republican in 1857. Served in the 14th district from 1837 to 1841. Served in the 1st district in 1857. Was Speaker of the Senate from 1838 to 1839 and again in 1841.
Samuel Leas Carpenter	Democratic	1837 – 1839		Served in the 18th district from 1835 to 1837
John C. Plumer	Jackson Democrat Party	1839 – 1842		
John Hill	Democratic	1843 – 1844		Pennsylvania State Senator for the 21st district from 1845 to 1846
William B. Anderson	Democratic	1845		
Robert Chambers Sterrett	Democratic	1847 – 1850		
Charles Rollin Buckalew	Democratic	1851 – 1854		Pennsylvania State Senator for the 13th district from 1857 to 1858. First term as Pennsylvania State Senator for the 16th district with his second term from 1859 to 1860. Minister Resident for Ecuador from 1858 to 1861. U.S. Senator for Pennsylvania from 1863 to 1869. U.S. Representative for Pennsylvania's 11th district from 1887 to 1889 and the 17th district from 1889 to 1891.
Bartram A. Schaffer	Republican	1857 – 1859		
George P. Steele	Democratic	1857 – 1859		
Robert A. Baldwin	Republican	1859		
William Hamilton	Republican	1861		
John Andrew Hiestand	Republican	1861		Pennsylvania State Representative from 1852 to 1853 and 1856. U.S. Representative for Pennsylvania's 9th district from 1885 to 1889.
Benjamin Champneys	Democratic	1863 – 1864		Pennsylvania State Representative from 1825 to 1826, 1828 to 1829 and 1863. Pennsylvania Attorney General from 1846 to 1848. Pennsylvania State Senator for the 6th district from 1843 to 1844 and the 17th district from 1865 to 1866
John M. Dunlap	Republican	1863 – 1864		Pennsylvania State Senator for the 17th district from 1865 to 1866
David Fleming	Republican	1865 – 1866		Pennsylvania State Senator for the 15th district from 1863 to 1864
G. Dawson Coleman	Republican	1867		
David Mumma	Republican	1867		
Charles Rollins Buckalew	Democratic	1869 – 1870		Pennsylvania State Senator for the 13th district from 1857 to 1858. Second term as Pennsylvania State Senator for the 16th district having previously served from 1851 to 1854
Butler B. Strang	Republican	1871 – 1874		Pennsylvania State Senator for the 25th district from 1875 to 1876
Evan Holben	Democratic	1877 – 1882		
Milton C. Henninger	Democratic	1883 – 1894		
Harry Gibson Stiles	Democratic	1895 – 1902		
Arthur Granville Dewalt	Democratic	1903 – 1910		U.S. Representative for Pennsylvania's 13th district from 1915 to 1921
James A. Miller	Democratic	1911 – 1914		
Horace Walker Schantz	Republican	1915 – 1930		
Henry L. Snyder	Democratic	1931 – 1934		
George A. Rupp	Democratic	1935 – 1938		
Oscar Jacob Tallman	Republican	1939 – 1950		
Tilghman A. Freed	Republican	1951 – 1954		Pennsylvania State Representative during the 1939, 1943, and 1945 terms.
John T. Van Sant	Republican	1955 – 1970	Allentown	Pennsylvania State Representative for the Lehigh County district from 1951 to 1954
Henry C. Messinger	Democratic	1971 – 1982	Allentown	World War II veteran and professor at Cornell University, President of the Pennsylvania State Education Association (1962–1964).
Guy Kratzer	Republican	1983 – 1986	Allentown	Evangelical pastor and Allentown City Councilman.
Roy Afflerbach	Democratic	1987 – 1998	Allentown	Pennsylvania State Representative for the 131st district from 1983 to 1986. 35th mayor of Allentown, Pennsylvania from 2002 to 2006
Charles W. Dent	Republican	1997 – 2005	Allentown	Pennsylvania State Representative for the 132nd district from 1991 to 1998. U.S. Representative for Pennsylvania's 15th congressional district from 2005 to 2018
Pat Browne	Republican	2005 – 2023	Allentown	Pennsylvania State Representative for the 131st district from 1995 to 2005
Jarrett Coleman	Republican	2023 – present	Upper Macungie	Commercial pilot elected to school board in 2021 due to opposition to COVID-19 lock-downs.
Mark Pinsley (elect)	Democratic	Taking Office		

== Recent election results ==
PA Senate election, 2022
Party	Candidate	Votes	%
Republican	Jarrett Coleman	68,344	54.2
Democratic	Mark Pinsley	57,844	45.8
Total votes		126,188	100.0
Republican hold			

Republican primary, 2022
Party	Candidate	Votes	%
Republican	Jarrett Coleman	17,049	50.04%
Republican	Pat Browne (incumbent)	17,025	49.96%
Total votes		34,074	100.0%

PA Senate election, 2018
Party	Candidate	Votes	%
Republican	Pat Browne (incumbent)	48,897	51.4
Democratic	Mark Pinsley	46,200	48.6
Total votes		95,097	100.0
Republican hold			

PA Senate election, 2014
Party	Candidate	Votes	%
Republican	Pat Browne (incumbent)	36,745	62.4
Democratic	Walter Felton	22,146	37.6
Total votes		58,891	100.0
Republican hold			

PA Senate election, 2010
Party	Candidate	Votes	%
Republican	Pat Browne (incumbent)	46,402	61.5
Democratic	Richard Orloski	29,028	38.5
Total votes		75,430	100.0
Republican hold			
