= Art Haywood =

American politician (born c.1958)

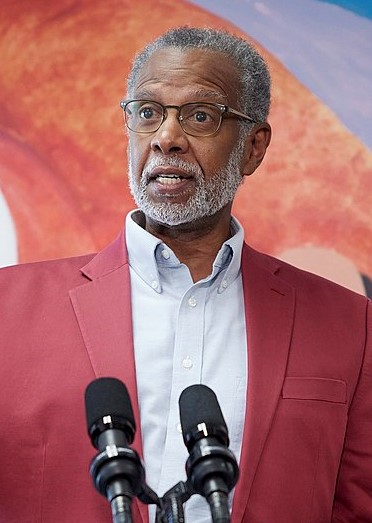

Member of the Pennsylvania Senate from the 4th district
- Incumbent
- Assumed office January 6, 2015
- Preceded by: LeAnna Washington

Personal details
- Born: c. 1958 (age 67–68)
- Party: Democratic
- Spouse: Julie Billingslea (m. 1989)
- Children: 3
- Education: Morehouse College (BA); London School of Economics (MS); University of Michigan (JD)
- Website: Official website

Arthur L. Haywood III (born c. 1958) is an American lawyer and politician currently serving as a member of the Pennsylvania State Senate from the 4th district since 2015 as a member of the Democratic Party.

== Early life and education ==
Haywood grew up in Toledo, Ohio, the son of Arthur and Virginia Haywood. His mother, Virginia, was a public school teacher and education activist.

Haywood graduated from Rogers High School in 1975. He graduated magna cum laude with a Bachelor of Arts degree from Morehouse College in 1979. A Marshall scholar, Haywood earned a Master of Science degree from London School of Economics. Haywood earned his Juris Doctor from the University of Michigan Law School in 1985.

Haywood moved to Philadelphia, Pennsylvania in 1985 to pursue his law career.

== Political career ==
In 2009, Haywood, inspired by the election of Barack Obama as President of the United States, ran for a seat on the Board of Commissioners of Cheltenham Township, Pennsylvania. He would serve for five years on the board, serving as president of the board for two years.

In 2014, Haywood defeated incumbent Pennsylvania State Senator LeAnna Washington, who was indicted for misuse of office, as a Democratic primary challenger. He then won in the general election to represent the 4th district. Haywood was re-elected in 2018 and 2022.

For the 2025–26 Session Haywood serves on the following committees in the State Senate:

- Health & Human Services (Minority Chair)
- Appropriations
- Finance
- Institutional Sustainability & Innovation
- Judiciary

== Political positions ==
=== Policing ===
Following the police killings of Eric Garner and Michael Brown Jr., in 2015, Haywood introduced legislation that would have mandated the Pennsylvania Attorney General to investigate all police-related killings. He reintroduced a modified version of the bill in 2022 that would have required district attorneys to investigate police killings without the involvement of the police department. If the district attorney decided not to prosecute the officer, the case would then be referred to the Attorney General.

=== Gun control ===
After failing to get in contact with Philadelphia Mayor Jim Kenney, Haywood staged a sit-in outside the mayor's office to advocate for a solution to Philadelphia's gun violence problem.

In 2022, Haywood campaigned for re-election on a platform that included restricting the sale and purchase of military grade weapons and accessories.

Following the federal passage of the Bipartisan Safer Communities Act, Haywood advocated for the passage of a red flag law in Pennsylvania.

=== January 6 ===
In 2022, Haywood sponsored a memorandum that called for the observance of the January 6 Capitol attack in Pennsylvania schools.

After several politicians participated in the Capitol attack, including State Senator Doug Mastriano, Haywood introduced a resolution that would empower the Pennsylvania Secretary of State in using Section 3 of the Fourteenth Amendment of the U.S. Constitution to disqualify such participants from ever holding elected office again.

In 2024, Haywood called for an ethics investigation into Mastriano's involvement in attempts to overturn the 2020 United States presidential election and January 6; the State Senate's Ethics Committee declined to investigate Haywood's complaint against Mastriano.

Haywood condemned President Donald Trump's blanket pardon for convicted January 6 participants as a “tremendous travesty.”

== Personal life ==
Haywood married his wife, Julie Billingslea, in 1989. They have three adult children. Julie is currently a member of the school board of the Cheltenham School District.

== Electoral history ==
2009 Cheltenham Township Board of Commissioners Democratic primary election, Ward 2
Party	Candidate	Votes	%
Democratic	Art Haywood	395	55.71
Democratic	Paul R. Greenwald	313	44.15
Write-in		1	0.14
Total votes		709	100.00

2009 Cheltenham Township Board of Commissioners election, Ward 2
Party	Candidate	Votes	%
Democratic	Art Haywood	946	77.57
Republican	Denise Marshall	259	22.09
Write-in		3	0.25
Total votes		1,218	100.00

2013 Cheltenham Township Board of Commissioners election, Ward 2
Party	Candidate	Votes	%
Democratic	Art Haywood (incumbent)	973	99.69
Write-in		3	0.31
Total votes		976	100.00

2014 Pennsylvania Senate Democratic primary election, District 4
Party	Candidate	Votes	%
Democratic	Art Haywood	16,113	39.75
Democratic	LeAnna Washington (incumbent)	13,708	33.82
Democratic	Brian D. Gralnick	10,711	26.43
Total votes		40,532	100.00

2014 Pennsylvania Senate election, District 4
Party	Candidate	Votes	%
Democratic	Art Haywood	78,001	81.37
Republican	Robin Matthew Gilchrist	16,498	17.21
Independent	Ines Reyes	1,355	1.41
Total votes		95,854	100.00

2018 Pennsylvania Senate election, District 4
Party	Candidate	Votes	%
Democratic	Art Haywood (incumbent)	110,147	86.58
Republican	Ronald F. Holt	17,068	13.42
Total votes		127,215	100.00

2022 Pennsylvania Senate election, District 4
Party	Candidate	Votes	%
Democratic	Art Haywood (incumbent)	85,705	83.93
Republican	Todd Johnson	16,305	15.97
Write-in		104	0.10
Total votes		102,114	100.00
