= Katie Muth =

Pennsylvanian Democratic party politician (1983 -)

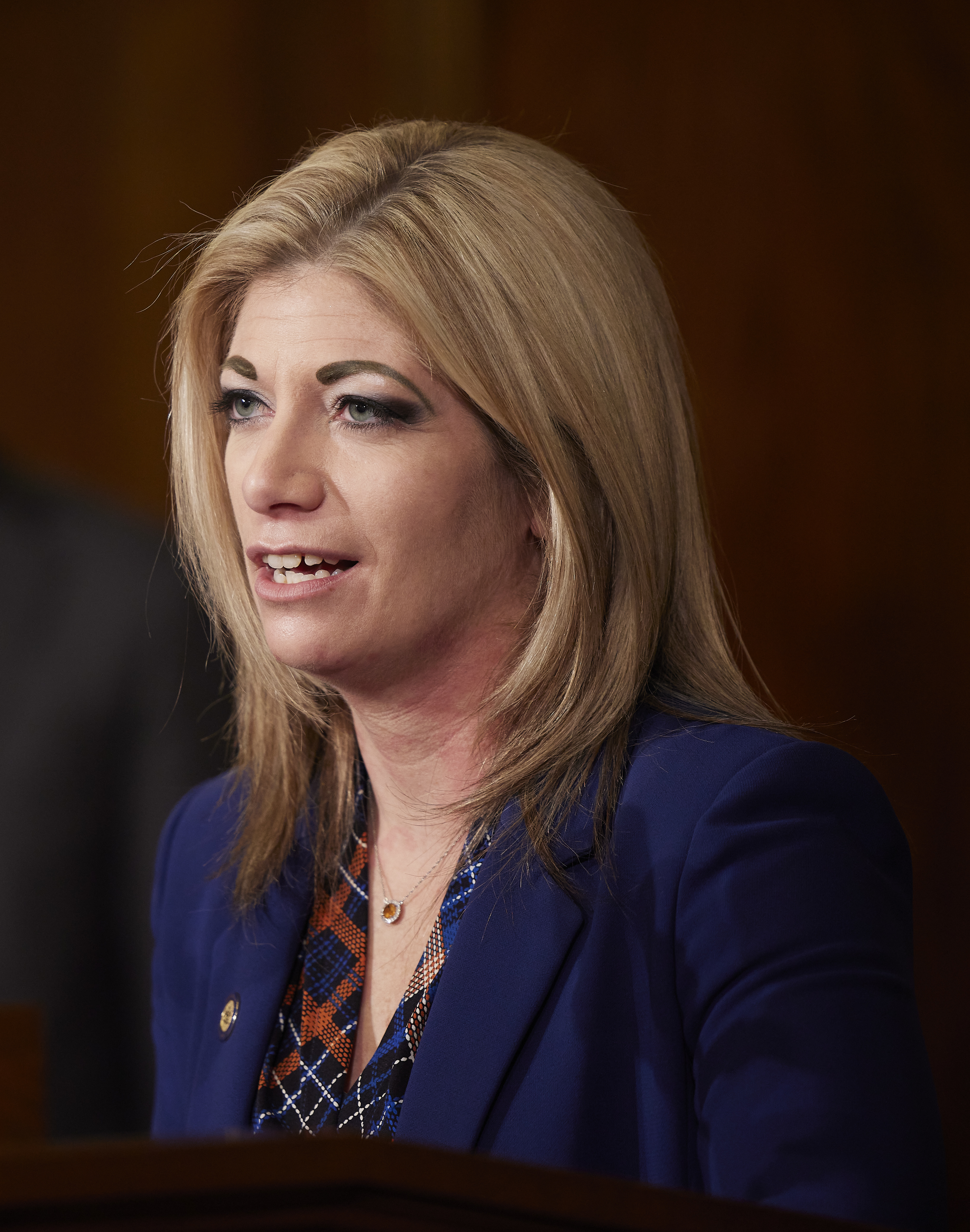

Member of the Pennsylvania Senate from the 44th district
- Incumbent
- Assumed office January 1, 2019
- Preceded by: John Rafferty Jr.

Personal details
- Born: September 20, 1983 (age 43) Monroeville, Pennsylvania, U.S.
- Party: Democratic
- Spouse: Trevor Muth
- Education: Pennsylvania State University (BS); A.T. Still University (MS)
- Website: Official website

Katie J. Muth (born September 20, 1983) is an American politician serving as a Democratic member of the Pennsylvania State Senate, representing the 44th District. Her district includes portions of northeastern Chester and southwestern Montgomery and southeastern Berks Counties.

== Political career ==
=== Elections ===
==== 2018 election ====
Muth was unopposed in the Democratic primary. In the general election, she defeated incumbent Republican John Rafferty - who had represented the 44th District since 2003 - by a margin of 62,692 to 57,943 (52% to 48%). Her victory was part of the "blue wave" that increased Democratic and female representation in the Pennsylvania General Assembly and Congressional delegation.

==== 2022 election ====
In the 2022 election Muth was unopposed in the Democratic primary. In the general election, she defeated Republican Jessica Florio. Muth won by a margin of 70,790 to 56,343.

During the 2021-2022 and 2023-2024 Legislative Sessions, Muth was elected by her colleagues in the Senate Democratic Caucus to the position of policy chair.

=== Committee assignments ===
Muth sits on the following committees in the Senate:

- Finance
- Rules and Executive Nominations
- Environmental Resources and Energy
- State Government
- Veterans Affairs and Emergency Preparedness –- Minority Chair

=== Political positions ===
Muth supports initiatives such as rebate programs to decrease property taxes, along with ending increasing property taxes. She supports increasing taxes for corporations, with an emphasis on the fossil fuel industry. She supports state-sponsored healthcare for all.

==== 2019 budget debate ====
During a budget debate in June 2019, Senator Muth took the floor and read a letter from a disabled constituent who relies on the PA General Assistance Program. Throughout her reading, Republican Majority Leader Jake Corman of Bellefonte loudly raised a point of order which was not recognized by the president (Democratic Lieutenant Governor John Fetterman). The Republican-controlled Senate voted against renewing the program 26–24.

==== 2020 presidential endorsement ====
On November 8, 2019 Muth tweeted her official endorsement of Senator Elizabeth Warren in her bid for President.

==== Support of cannabis decriminalization ====
Muth was a co-sponsor of Senate Bill 107 in 2021, which sought to decriminalize possession of cannabis. In 2023, when the same bill was introduced as Senate Bill 1028, Muth did not initially support it but eventually signed on as the 17th sponsor. On January 25, 2024, Muth responded to criticism on X alleging she withdrew support due to pressure from cannabis corporations seeking to profit, stating she was collecting feedback from "stakeholders."

==== Legislative work on data centers ====
State Senator Katie Muth has emerged as a leading critic of hyperscale data center expansion in Pennsylvania, citing concerns over energy demand, ratepayer impacts, environmental strain, and local land-use control. Her legislative efforts have focused on both a temporary pause on development and long-term utility cost protections for residents and small businesses.

==== Proposed moratorium on data center development (SB 1359) ====
In 2025–2026, Muth announced plans to introduce legislation establishing a statewide moratorium on new hyperscale data center development in Pennsylvania. The proposal calls for a three-year pause on permitting and construction to allow state and local governments time to evaluate regulatory frameworks, zoning standards, and infrastructure impacts associated with large-scale data center projects.

According to public memos circulated to legislative colleagues, Muth framed the moratorium as a “measured, responsible and necessary step” to address rapid development trends and to ensure that future siting decisions are informed by updated environmental and public health standards. She argued that municipalities needed additional time to assess water usage, electricity demand, and emergency preparedness considerations tied to data center operations.

The proposal has been characterized as part of a broader national policy debate over how to regulate rapidly expanding AI and cloud computing infrastructure.

==== Ratepayer Protection Act (Senate Bill 1114) ====
Muth is the primary sponsor of Senate Bill 1114 (2025–2026 Regular Session), also known as the Pennsylvania Ratepayer Protection Act. The legislation seeks to prevent residential and small business utility customers from subsidizing electricity infrastructure costs associated with large load users, including hyperscale data centers.

The bill would establish a separate “large load customer” classification under Pennsylvania utility law and require such customers to pay the full incremental costs of transmission and distribution upgrades needed to serve their demand. It also authorizes the Pennsylvania Public Utility Commission to oversee cost allocation, require long-term service agreements, and collect operational data from high-demand facilities.

Supporters of the legislation describe it as a consumer protection measure intended to ensure that grid expansion costs are borne by the entities driving increased demand rather than distributed across all ratepayers. The bill was referred to the Senate Consumer Protection and Professional Licensure Committee on December 15, 2025, and remained under consideration as of late 2025.

=== PSERS ===
Muth made headlines when she sued Pennsylvania’s largest public pension system amid a federal investigation into aspects of the agency’s undertakings, saying agency officials have refused to share documents with her, even though she is a board member. Muth’s lawsuit said board members are being asked to vote on approximately $1 billion in investments at Thursday’s meeting, “yet attempts to obtain information, data and documents that in her view could better inform” those decisions were rejected. The Associated Press has previously reported that subpoenas from federal investigators center on the pension system's purchases of parcels of land in downtown Harrisburg and its calculations about the fund's investment performance that help determine the balance of payments into the system by taxpayers and school employees.

== 44th Senatorial District ==
Pennsylvania State Senate District 44 includes parts of Berks County, Chester County, and Montgomery County.

Berks County:

- Union Township
- Birdsboro

Chester County:

- Atglen
- Caln Township
- Charlestown Township
- East Brandywine Township
- East Coventry Township
- East Nantmeal Township
- East Pikeland Township
- East Vincent Township
- East Whiteland Township
- Elverson
- Honey Brook
- Honey Brook Township
- North Coventry Township
- Parkesburg
- Phoenixville
- Sadsbury Township
- Schuylkill Township
- South Coventry Township
- Spring City
- Upper Uwchlan Township
- Uwchlan Township
- Wallace Township
- Warwick Township
- West Brandywine Township
- West Caln Township
- West Nantmeal Township
- West Pikeland Township
- West Sadsbury Township
- West Vincent Township

Montgomery County:

- Lower Providence Township
- Royersford
- Upper Providence Township

== Education ==
Muth received a B.S. degree in Athletic Training from the Pennsylvania State University in 2011 and graduated from A.T. Still University of Health Sciences in Mesa, Arizona with a M.S. in Athletic Training in 2013.

Pennsylvania State Senate
Preceded by John Rafferty Jr.	Member of the Pennsylvania Senate from the 44th district 2019–present	Incumbent
