= Pennsylvania's 46th Senate district =

American legislative district

Pennsylvania's 46th State Senate district
Senator
Camera Bartolotta; R–Carroll Township, Washington County
- Population (2021): 250,466

Pennsylvania State Senate District 46 includes part of Beaver County and all of Greene County and Washington County. It is currently represented by Republican Camera Bartolotta.

== District profile ==
The district includes the following areas:

Beaver County:

- Frankfort Springs
- Hanover Township
- Independence Township

All of Greene County

All of Washington County

== Senators ==
Representative	Party	Years	District home	Note	Counties
William J. Lane	Democratic	1946–1964		Elected May 21, 1946	Greene, Washington
William J. Lane	Democratic	1965–1966		Elected May 21, 1946	Washington
William J. Lane	Democratic	1967–1970		Elected May 21, 1946	Greene, Washington (part)
Austin Murphy	Democratic	1971–1972		Resigned January 4, 1977	Greene, Washington (part)
Austin Murphy	Democratic	1973–1977		Resigned January 4, 1977	Greene, Fayette (part), Washington (part)
J. Barry Stout	Democratic	1977–1982		Seated June 7, 1977	Greene, Fayette (part), Washington (part)
J. Barry Stout	Democratic	1983–1992		Seated June 7, 1977	Greene, Beaver (part), Washington (part)
J. Barry Stout	Democratic	1993–2002		Seated June 7, 1977	Greene, Beaver (part), Washington (part), Westmoreland (part)
J. Barry Stout	Democratic	2003–2010		Seated June 7, 1977	Greene, Allegheny (part), Beaver (part), Washington (part)
Timothy J. Solobay	Democratic	2011–2014		Defeated for re-election	Greene, Allegheny (part), Beaver (part), Washington (part)
Timothy J. Solobay	Democratic	2013–2014		Defeated for re-election	Greene, Beaver (part), Washington (part)
Camera Bartolotta	Republican	2015–present		Incumbent	Greene, Beaver (part), Washington (part)

== Recent election results ==
PA Senate election, 2022
Party	Candidate	Votes	%
Republican	Camera Bartolotta (incumbent)	78,262	100
Total votes		78,262	100.0
Republican hold			

PA Senate election, 2018
Party	Candidate	Votes	%
Republican	Camera Bartolotta (incumbent)	55,527	58.8
Democratic	James Craig	38,908	41.2
Total votes		94,435	100.0
Republican hold			

PA Senate election, 2014
Party	Candidate	Votes	%
Republican	Camera Bartolotta	36,697	53.2
Democratic	Tim Solobay (incumbent)	32,237	46.8
Total votes		68,934	100.0
Republican gain from Democratic			

PA Senate election, 2010
Party	Candidate	Votes	%
Democratic	Tim Solobay	39,530	53.3
Republican	Kris Vanderman	34,597	46.7
Total votes		74,127	100.0
Democratic hold			
