= Chris Gebhard =

American politician

Member of the Pennsylvania Senate from the 48th district
- Incumbent
- Assumed office June 9, 2021
- Preceded by: Dave Arnold
- Constituency: Lebanon County and parts of Dauphin and York counties

Personal details
- Born: 1974 or 1975 (age 51–52)
- Party: Republican
- Spouse: Sarah
- Children: 2
- Education: Vanderbilt University (B.A.)
- Profession: Business owner

Christopher M. Gebhard (born 1974 or 1975) is a Pennsylvania state senator who represents the 48th district, which includes all of Lebanon County and portions of Berks and Lancaster counties. He is a member of the Republican Party and the owner of an insurance and risk management firm.

== Early life and career ==
Gebhard was born in 1974/1975 to parents Peter and Lauralee Gebhard. He attended Cedar Crest High School in Lebanon before graduating from The Hill School in Pottstown in 1992. Gebhard earned a Bachelor of Arts degree in psychology from Vanderbilt University in Nashville, after which he returned to Lebanon and began working for his father's insurance agency just after it had merged with a larger company in 1996. Later that year, Gebhard took a job with Cincinnati Insurance Company in Ohio, returning to Hoaster Gebhard in early 2000 but as a "regular employee" per his father. By 2014, Gebhard became the CEO and president of Hoaster Gebhard & Co., an insurance and risk management firm in Lebanon.

== Pennsylvania Senate ==
After Dave Arnold died in January 2021 while serving as state senator from Pennsylvania's 48th district, a special election to fill the position was scheduled for May 18, 2021. Gebhard was chosen by the Lebanon County Republican Committee as the Republican candidate, from a list of eight potential names. Running against three other candidates, he won the special election to complete Arnold's term with 62 percent of the vote. Gebhard was sworn in to office on June 9, 2021. In 2022, he ran for re-election against Calvin Clements, who was his closest opponent in 2022, and won with 67% of the vote.

For the 2025–2026 session, Gebhard serves on the following committees in the State Senate:

- Banking & Insurance (Chair)
- Community, Economic & Recreational Development (Vice-Chair)
- Aging & Youth
- Communications & Technology
- Consumer Protection & Professional Licensure
- Institutional Sustainability & Innovation
- Rules & Executive Nominations

== Personal life ==
Gebhard lives in North Cornwall Township with his wife Sarah and two sons.

He has played golf since he was a teenager, and won most of the major local golf tournaments, including several better ball pairs tournaments.

Political offices
Pennsylvania State Senate
Preceded by Dave Arnold	Member of the Pennsylvania Senate from the 48th district 2021–present	Incumbent
