= Pennsylvania's 14th Senate district =

American legislative district

Pennsylvania's 14th State Senate district
Senator
Nick Miller; D–Allentown
- Population (2021): 267,292

Pennsylvania State Senate District 14 includes parts of Lehigh County and Northampton County. It is currently represented by Democrat Nick Miller. Prior to the current reapportionment plan it was a Luzerne County seat that was moved to the Lehigh Valley to reflect long-term population shifts.

== District profile ==
The district includes the following areas:

Lehigh County

- Allentown (Part, Wards 01, 02, 03, 04, 05, 06, 07, 08, 09, 10, 11, 12, 14, 15, 16, 17 and 19)
- Catasauqua
- Coplay
- Emmaus
- Fountain Hill
- Hanover Township
- Salisbury Township
- South Whitehall Township [PART, Districts 01, 02, 04, 05 and 07]
- Whitehall Township

Northampton County

- Allen Township
- Bath
- Bushkill Township
- Chapman
- East Allen Township
- Hanover Township
- Lehigh Township
- Moore Township
- North Catasauqua
- Northampton
- Walnutport

== Senators ==
Representative	Party	Years	Note
John Tod	Democratic-Republican	1815 – 1818	Pennsylvania State Representative from 1810 to 1813. Speaker of the Senate from 1815 to 1816. U.S. Representative for Pennsylvania's 8th congressional district from 1821 to 1823 and Pennsylvania's 13th congressional district from 1823 to 1824
William Piper	Democratic-Republican	1817 – 1820	Pennsylvania State Senator for the 22nd district from 1821 to 1832. U.S. Representative for Pennsylvania's 7th congressional district from 1811 to 1813 and Pennsylvania's 8th congressional district from 1813 to 1817
David Mann	Democratic-Republican	1821 – 1822	Pennsylvania State Senator for the 22nd district from 1823 to 1824
William Andrew McIlvane	Democratic-Republican	1823 – 1826	
Zephaniah Herbert	Democratic	1823 – 1828	
Henry Logan	Democratic	1827 – 1830	Pennsylvania State Representative from 1818 to 1819. U.S. Representative for Pennsylvania's 11th congressional district from 1835 to 1839
Ezra Blythe	Democratic	1829 – 1832	
Henry Smyser	Democratic	1831 – 1834	
David Middlecoff	Democratic	1833 – 1836	
James McConkey	Anti-Masonic	1835 – 1836	Pennsylvania State Senator for the 2nd district from 1837 to 1838
Jacob Cassat	Whig	1837 – 1838	
David Fullerton	Anti-Masonic	1839 – 1840	U.S. Representative for Pennsylvania's 5th district from 1819 to 1820. Pennsylvania State Senator for the 15th district from 1827 to 1838
Thomas C. Miller	Democratic	1837 – 1840	
William R. Gorgas	Democratic	1841 – 1844	
James Xavier McLanahan	Democratic	1841 – 1842	Pennsylvania State Senator for the 18th district from 1843 to 1844. U.S. Representative for Pennsylvania's 16th congressional district from 1849 to 1853. Chair of the House Judiciary Committee from 1851 to 1853
Jesse C. Horton	Democratic	1845 – 1846	Pennsylvania State Senator for the 12th district from 1843 to 1844
Benjamin Jordan	Whig	1845 – 1848	
Robert Montgomery Frick	Whig	1849 – 1850	
James W. Quiggle	Buchanan Democrat	1853 – 1856	
Francis Jordan	Whig	1855 – 1856	
Andrew Gregg Jr.	Republican	1855 – 1862	
Henry Fetter	Democratic	1859 – 1860	Pennsylvania State Senator for the 13th district from 1857 to 1858
Erasmus Darwin Crawford	Democratic	1859 – 1862	
George Hough Bucher	Democratic	1863 – 1864	Pennsylvania State Senator for the 18th district from 1865 to 1866
John Walls	Democratic	1865 – 1868	
John B. Beck	Democratic	1867 – 1870	
Lafayette Fitch	Republican	1871 – 1874	
Peter J. Roebuck	Republican	1875 – 1888	
Christian Shuman Kauffman	Republican	1879 – 1882	
John M. Stehman	Republican	1883 – 1890	
John S. Hoover	Democratic	1889 – 1890	
Winfield S. Smith	Republican	1891 – 1894	
Christian Charles Kauffman	Republican	1895 – 1896	
Jeremiah Albert Stober	Republican	1899 – 1906	
George Franklin Rowland	Democratic	1907 – 1908	
Miles C. Rowland	Democratic	1909 – 1910	
Elmer Warner	Republican	1915 – 1918	
Wallace James Barnes	Republican	1919 – 1922	
Jacob Eyster	Democratic-Republican	1921 – 1924	
Harvey D. Huffman	Democratic	1923 – 1938	
William D. Pethick	Republican	1931 – 1934	
Montgomery F. Crowe	Republican	1939 – 1954	
William Z. Scott	Republican	1955 – 1965	
Martin L. Murray	Democratic	1969 – 1980	Pennsylvania State Representative for Luzerne County from 1945 to 1948. Pennsylvania State Senator for the 21st district from 1957 to 1964. President pro tempore of the Pennsylvania Senate from 1971 to 1980.
Raphael J. Musto	Democratic	1983 – 2010	Pennsylvania State Representative for the 118th district from 1971 to 1980. U.S. Representative for Pennsylvania's 11th district from 1980 to 1981
John Yudichak	Democratic	2011 – 2019	Pennsylvania State Representative for the 119th district from 1999 to 2010. Changed party affiliation from Democrat to Independent and caucuses with the Republicans.
John Yudichak	Independent	2019 – 2023	Pennsylvania State Representative for the 119th district from 1999 to 2010. Changed party affiliation from Democrat to Independent and caucuses with the Republicans.
Nick Miller	Democratic	2023 – present	

== Recent election results ==
PA Senate election, 2022
Party	Candidate	Votes	%
Democratic	Nick Miller	46,443	53.5
Republican	Dean Browning	40,360	46.5
Total votes		86,803	100.0
Democratic gain from Independent			

PA Senate election, 2018
Party	Candidate	Votes	%
Democratic	John Yudichak (incumbent)	51,521	100.0
Total votes		51,521	100.0
Democratic hold			

PA Senate election, 2014
Party	Candidate	Votes	%
Democratic	John Yudichak (incumbent)	41,980	100.0
Total votes		41,980	100.0
Democratic hold			

PA Senate election, 2010
Party	Candidate	Votes	%
Democratic	John Yudichak	37,466	55.6
Republican	Stephen Urban	26,212	38.9
Libertarian	Betsy Summers	3,748	5.5
Total votes		67,426	100.0
Democratic hold			
