= Patrick J. Stefano =

American politician

Member of the Pennsylvania Senate from the 32nd district
- Incumbent
- Assumed office January 6, 2015
- Preceded by: Rich Kasunic

Personal details
- Born: 1966 (age 59–60)
- Party: Republican

Patrick J. Stefano (born in 1966) is a Pennsylvania politician. A Republican, he is currently a Pennsylvania State Senator for the 32nd district. Prior to being elected to the State Senate in the 2014 election, Stefano was a business owner and served as vice president of the Fayette County Chamber of Commerce.

For the 2025-2026 Session, Stefano serves on the following committees in the State Senate:

- Consumer Protection & Professional Licensure (Chair)
- State Government (Vice Chair)
- Aging & Youth
- Community, Economic & Recreational Development
- Health & Human Services
- Rules & Executive Nominations
- Transportation
