= Pennsylvania's 6th Senate district =

American legislative district

Pennsylvania's 6th State Senate district
Senator
Frank Farry; R–Langhorne
- Population (2021): 269,699

Pennsylvania State Senate District 6 includes parts of Bucks County. It is currently represented by Republican Frank Farry.

== District profile ==
The district includes the following areas:

- Bensalem Township
- Hulmeville
- Ivyland
- Langhorne
- Langhorne Manor
- Lower Southampton Township
- Middletown Township
- Northampton Township
- Penndel
- Upper Southampton Township
- Warminster Township
- Warrington Township
- Warwick Township
- Wrightstown Township

== Senators ==
Representative	Party	Years	District home	Note
John Forster	Federalist	1813 – 1817		
John Sawyer	Democratic-Republican	1819 – 1821		
Conrad Feger	Federalist	1821 – 1823		
James Burd Hubley	Federalist	1823 – 1825		
William Audenreid	Democratic-Republican	1825 – 1827		
George Schall Jr.	Democratic	1825 – 1827		
John Kerlin	Federalist	1825 – 1829		
Daniel A. Bertolet	Republican	1829 – 1831		
Jacob Krebs	Democratic	1829 – 1835		Pennsylvania State Representative from 1812 to 1813. U.S. Representative for Pennsylvania's 7th congressional district from 1826 to 1827.
Paul Geiger	Democratic	1831 – 1835		
John Strohm	Anti-Masonic	1837 – 1842		U.S. Representative for Pennsylvania from 1845 to 1849
James A. Caldwell	Democratic	1837 – 1839		
Thomas Evans Cochran	Democratic	1839 – 1841		
William Hiester	Anti-Masonic	1841 – 1843		U.S. Representative for Pennsylvania's 4th congressional district from 1831 to 1837
Henry Chapman	Democratic	1843 – 1845		U.S. Representative for Pennsylvania's 7th congressional district from 1857 to 1859
Benjamin Champneys	Democratic	1843 – 1845		Pennsylvania State Representative from 1825 to 1826, 1828 to 1829 and 1863. Pennsylvania Attorney General from 1846 to 1848. Pennsylvania Senator for the 16th district from 1863 to 1866 and the 17th district from 1865 to 1866
Josiah Rich	Whig	1847 – 1848		
Benjamin Malone	Whig	1849 – 1851		
Howard K. Sager	Democratic	1853 – 1854		
Jonathan Ely	Democratic	1855 – 1857		
Benjamin Nunemacher	Democratic	1859 – 1860		
Oliver P. James	Democratic	1865 – 1866		
Richard J. Linderman	Democratic	1867 – 1869		
Jesse W. Knight	Democratic	1871 – 1872		Pennsylvania State Senator for the 7th district from 1873 to 1874
Aaron K. Dunkle	Republican	1875 – 1877		
Wiliam Elliott	Republican	1879 – 1881		
A. Wilson Norris	Republican	1881 – 1882		
Robert Adams Jr.	Republican	1883 – 1885		United States Minister to Brazil from 1889 to 1890. U.S. Representative for Pennsylvania's 2nd congressional district from 1893 to 1906.
Boies Penrose	Republican	1887 – 1889		U.S. Senator for Pennsylvania from 1897 to 1921. Political boss of the Pennsylvania Republican political machine.
Israel Wilson Durham	Republican	1897 – 1898		Pennsylvania State Senator for the 2nd district from 1899 to 1900. Political boss of Philadelphia's 7th ward. President and principal owner of the Philadelphia Phillies in 1909.
John Morin Scott	Republican	1899 – 1906		Pennsylvania State Senator for the 2nd district from 1907 to 1910
Francis Salisbury McElhenny	Republican	1907 – 1913		
Owen Blair Jenkins	Republican	1915 – 1917		
George Woodward	Republican	1919 – 1947		
John W. Lord Jr.	Republican	1947 – 1951		Philadelphia City Councilman from 1952 to 1954. Judge of the United States District Court for the Eastern District of Pennsylvania from 1954 to 1971. Chief Judge of the United States District Court for the Eastern District of Pennsylvania from 1969 to 1971. Senior Judge of the United States District Court for the Eastern District of Pennsylvania from 1971 to 1972.
Martin Silvert	Democratic	1951 – 1963		
William John McLaughlin III	Republican	1965 – 1966		
John F. Byrne Jr.	Democratic	1967 – 1970		
Robert A. Rovner	Republican	1971 – 1974		
H. Craig Lewis	Democratic	1975 – 1994		
Tommy Tomlinson	Republican	1995 – 2023		
Frank Farry	Republican	2023 – present		

== Recent election results ==
PA Senate election, 2022
Party	Candidate	Votes	%
Republican	Frank Farry	67,406	53.2
Democratic	Ann Marie Mitchell	57,264	45.2
Libertarian	Brandon Bentrim	1,961	1.6
Total votes		126,631	100.0
Republican hold			

PA Senate election, 2018
Party	Candidate	Votes	%
Republican	Tommy Tomlinson (incumbent)	54,382	50.03
Democratic	Tina Davis	54,308	49.97
Total votes		108,690	100.0
Republican hold			

PA Senate election, 2014
Party	Candidate	Votes	%
Republican	Tommy Tomlinson (incumbent)	45,361	61.8
Democratic	Kimberly Yeager-Rose	27,997	38.2
Total votes		73,358	100.0
Republican hold			

PA Senate election, 2010
Party	Candidate	Votes	%
Republican	Tommy Tomlinson (incumbent)	49,958	58.2
Democratic	Bryan Allen	35,879	41.8
Total votes		85,837	100.0
Republican hold			
