= Frank Farry =

American politician

Member of the Pennsylvania Senate from the 6th district
- Incumbent
- Assumed office January 3, 2023
- Preceded by: Tommy Tomlinson
- Succeeded by: Eileen Hartnett Albillar (elect)

Member of the Pennsylvania House of Representatives from the 142nd district
- In office January 6, 2009 – November 30, 2022
- Preceded by: Christopher J. King
- Succeeded by: Joe Hogan

Personal details
- Born: December 31, 1972 (age 53)
- Party: Republican
- Spouse: Kristen
- Children: 2
- Education: University of Pennsylvania (BS); Rutgers University (MS, JD)

Frank Farry (born December 31, 1972) is an American politician. A Republican, he is a member of the Pennsylvania State Senate representing the 6th district since 2023. He previously served in the Pennsylvania House of Representatives representing the 142nd legislative district from 2009–22.

== Career ==
Before his election to the Pennsylvania House of Representatives, Farry served as assistant township manager for Middletown Township for eight years. He is also a practicing attorney with the firm of Jackson, Cook, Caracappa, and Bloom in Fairless Hills, Pennsylvania. He is the chief at Langhorne-Middletown Fire Co.

During his time in the House of Representatives, he served on the Consumer Affairs and Human Services committees.

Farry has served as a State Senator for the 6th district since 2023.

For the 2025-2026 Session Farry serves on the following committees in the State Senate:

- Institutional Sustainability & Innovation (Chair)
- Consumer Protection & Professional Licensure (Vice Chair)
- Communications & Technology
- Community, Economic & Recreational Development
- Health & Human Services
- Law & Justice
- Urban Affairs & Housing

== Personal life ==
Farry graduated from Neshaminy High School. He earned a bachelor of science degree in Economics from the University of Pennsylvania, a master of science in Public Policy from Rutgers University, and his juris doctor from Rutgers University School of Law.

Political offices
Pennsylvania State Senate
Preceded by Tommy Tomlinson	Member of the Pennsylvania Senate from the 6th district 2023-Present	Incumbent
Pennsylvania House of Representatives
Preceded by Christopher J. King	Member of the Pennsylvania House of Representatives from the 142nd district 2009-2022	Succeeded by Joe Hogan
