= Pennsylvania's 32nd Senate district =

American legislative district

Pennsylvania's 32nd State Senate district
Senator
Patrick J. Stefano; R–Bullskin Township
- Population (2021): 252,099

Pennsylvania State Senate District 32 includes part of Westmoreland County and all of Bedford County, Fayette County, and Somerset County. It is currently represented by Republican Patrick J. Stefano.

== District profile ==
The district includes the following areas:

All of Bedford County

All of Fayette County

All of Somerset County

Westmoreland County

- Scottdale

== Senators ==
Representative	Party	Years	District home	Note	Counties
Thomas J. Kalman	Democratic	1957–1964			Fayette
Thomas J. Kalman	Democratic	1965–1966			Fayette, Greene
Thomas J. Kalman	Democratic	1967–1970			Fayette, Westmoreland (part)
William E. Duffield	Democratic	1971–1978			Fayette, Westmoreland (part)
William E. Duffield	Democratic	1973–1978			Fayette (part), Westmoreland (part)
J. William Lincoln	Democratic	1979–1982			Fayette (part), Westmoreland (part)
J. William Lincoln	Democratic	1983–1992			Fayette, Somerset (part)
J. William Lincoln	Democratic	1993–1994			Fayette, Somerset (part), Washington (part), Westmoreland (part)
Richard A. Kasunic	Democratic	1995–2014			Fayette, Somerset, Washington, Westmoreland (part)
Patrick J. Stefano	Republican	2015–present		Incumbent	Fayette, Somerset, Westmoreland (part)
