= Camera Bartolotta =

American politician

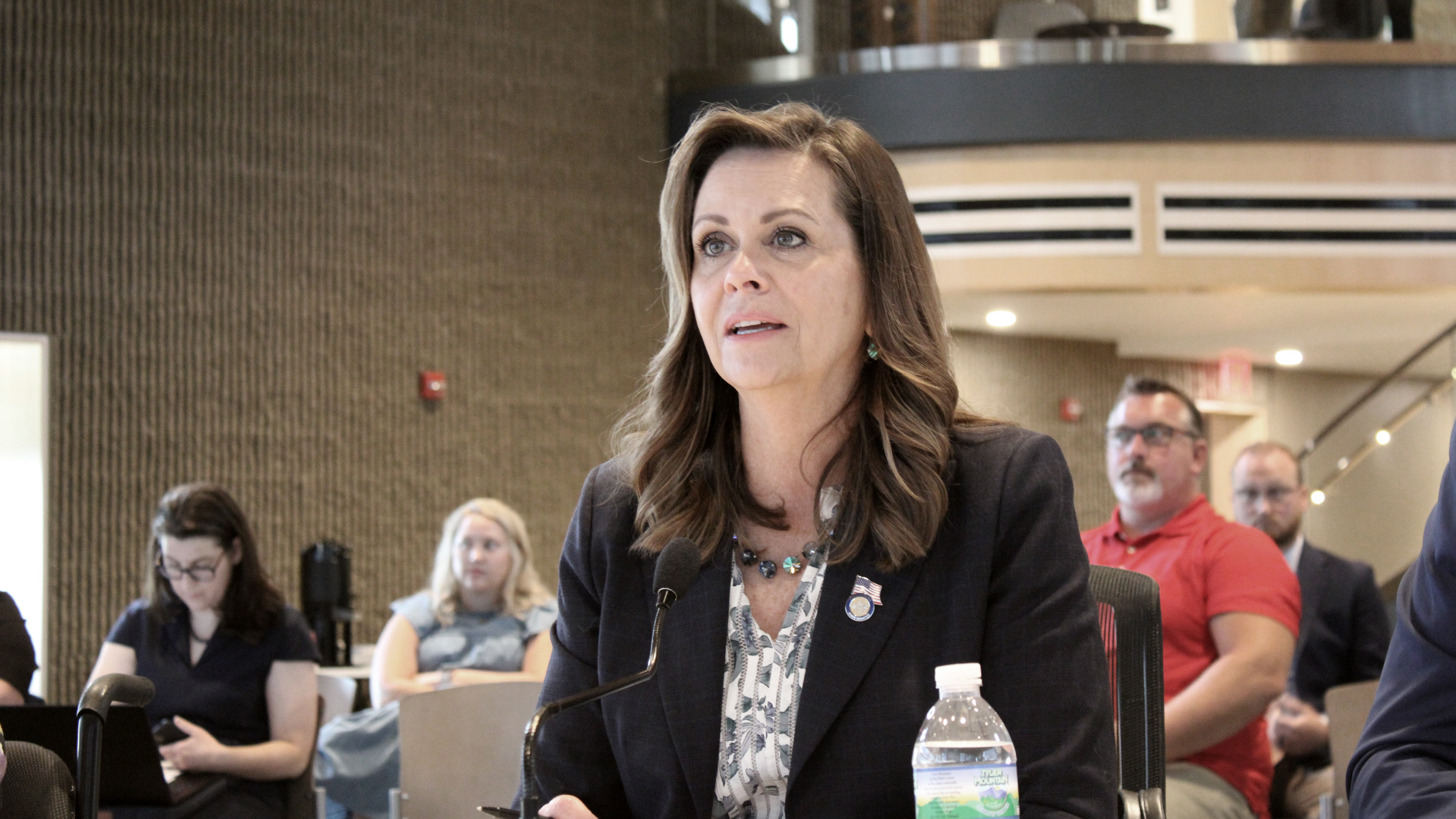

Member of the Pennsylvania Senate from the 46th district
- Incumbent
- Assumed office January 6, 2015
- Preceded by: Tim Solobay

Personal details
- Born: December 4, 1963 (age 62)
- Party: Republican
- Spouse: Bill DeWeese
- Education: Corvallis High School (California); Saint Mary's College of California (BS)

Camera Chatham Bartolotta is an American politician. A Republican, she is currently the Pennsylvania state Senator for the 46th district.

== Education ==
Bartolotta attended Corvallis High School, an all-girls Catholic school in Los Angeles. She earned a Bachelor of Science degree at Saint Mary's College of California.

== Career ==
She serves on the Pennsylvania Council on the Arts, Pittsburgh Film Office board of trustees, the Pittsburgh Ballet board of trustees, the University of Pittsburgh Institute of Politics board of fellows, and the Pennsylvania Prison Society board.

Camera Bartolotta represents the 46th Senatorial District which includes residents of Beaver, Greene and Washington counties. She was elected to her first term in 2014, defeating Democratic incumbent Tim Solobay. In doing so, she became the first Republican to represent the 46th district in 38 years, and the first ever woman.

In the Senate, Bartolotta serves as Chair of the Labor & Industry Committee, as well as serving as a member of the Local Government Committee, Rules & Executive Nominations Committee, Transportation Committee, and Veterans Affairs & Emergency Preparedness Committee. She is also a co-chair of the Senate Gas and Oil Caucus, co-founded the bipartisan Criminal Justice Reform Caucus, and founded the Film Industry Caucus, a bicameral group working to support research and analysis of the role that Pennsylvania's film industry plays in economic development, job creation and revenue enhancement.

=== Committee Assignments ===
As of July 2025, Bartolotta serves as the Majority Caucus Chair.

For the 2025-2026 Session Bartolotta serves on the following committees in the State Senate:

- Labor & Industry (Vice Chair)
- Community, Economic & Recreational Development
- Environmental Resources & Energy
- Judiciary
- Rules & Executive Nominations
- Transportation
