= Nick Miller (politician) =

American politician

Member of the Pennsylvania Senate from the 14th district
- Incumbent
- Assumed office January 3, 2023
- Preceded by: John Yudichak

Personal details
- Party: Democratic
- Education: Pennsylvania State University (BS); University of Pennsylvania (MPA, ML)
- Alma mater: Allentown Central Catholic HS
- Website: Campaign website

Nicholas P. Miller (b. circa 1995) is an American politician and businessman. He is a Democratic member of the Pennsylvania State Senate, representing the 14th District since 2023.

== Early life and education ==
A native of Allentown, Pennsylvania, Miller is the son of Lehigh County Court of Common Pleas Judge Michele Varricchio. He graduated from Allentown Central Catholic High School in 2013 and subsequently attended Pennsylvania State University, where he earned a bachelor's degree in finance in 2017. He also holds two degrees from the University of Pennsylvania, an MPA from Fels Institute of Government and a Master of Studies in Law from the University of Pennsylvania Law School.

== Career ==
Miller worked as a project management consultant for IBM before becoming a part-time realtor in Allentown. He was elected to the Allentown School Board in November 2019 and served as the board's vice president from 2020 to 2021.

=== Pennsylvania State Senate ===
During the 2021 redistricting process, Pennsylvania's 14th Senate District was relocated from Northeastern Pennsylvania to the Lehigh Valley. Miller narrowly won the 2022 Democratic primary for the open seat, defeating his closest competitor by only 48 votes. He went on to win the general election, defeating Republican Dean Browning. At the age of 28, Miller was the youngest person elected to the State Senate in 135 years. In 2024, Miller was elected as Senate Democrats' policy committee chairman.
