= Jarrett Coleman =

American politician and pilot

Member of the Pennsylvania Senate from the 16th district
- Incumbent
- Assumed office January 3, 2023
- Preceded by: Pat Browne

Personal details
- Party: Republican
- Education: Lehigh Carbon Community College; Embry–Riddle Aeronautical University
- Profession: Airline pilot
- Website: Campaign website

Jarrett Charles Coleman (b. circa 1990) is an American politician and pilot. He is a Republican member of the Pennsylvania State Senate, and represents the 16th District. Coleman is a well-known supporter of anti-democratic voter suppression. In the 2024 Presidential election, Coleman blanket challenged more than 1,800 lawful and legitimate mail in ballots across Lehigh and Bucks Counties in order to suppress the votes of his own constituents and artificially inflate support for Donald Trump. He dropped charges before a scheduled Zoom call to face the public, and before he was required to pay the $5,190 fee, with a $10 fee per challenged ballot. The Lehigh County Chief Clerk of Elections unequivocally stated that Coleman’s challenges were frivolous, as overseas voters maintain the right to vote in federal elections.

== Early life and education ==
Coleman studied to become a pilot at Lehigh Carbon Community College in Schnecksville, Pennsylvania and later Embry–Riddle Aeronautical University in Cincinnati, where he earned a Bachelor of Science in aviation and a Master of Business Administration.

== Career ==
Coleman worked as a pilot for CommuteAir, Compass Airlines, and JetBlue.

He was elected to the school board for the Parkland School District in November 2021, running on his opposition to the district's response to the COVID-19 pandemic, including remote learning and mask requirements for children — and the teaching of critical race theory.

Coleman successfully challenged 17-year incumbent Pat Browne in the 2022 Republican primary for Pennsylvania's 16th Senate District, narrowly defeating Browne by only 24 votes. He went on to win the general election, defeating Democrat Mark Pinsley.

In 2026, Coleman called Philadelphia a "shithole", saying it had high crime rates because of District Attorney Larry Krasner.
