= Jay Costa =

American politician (born 1957)

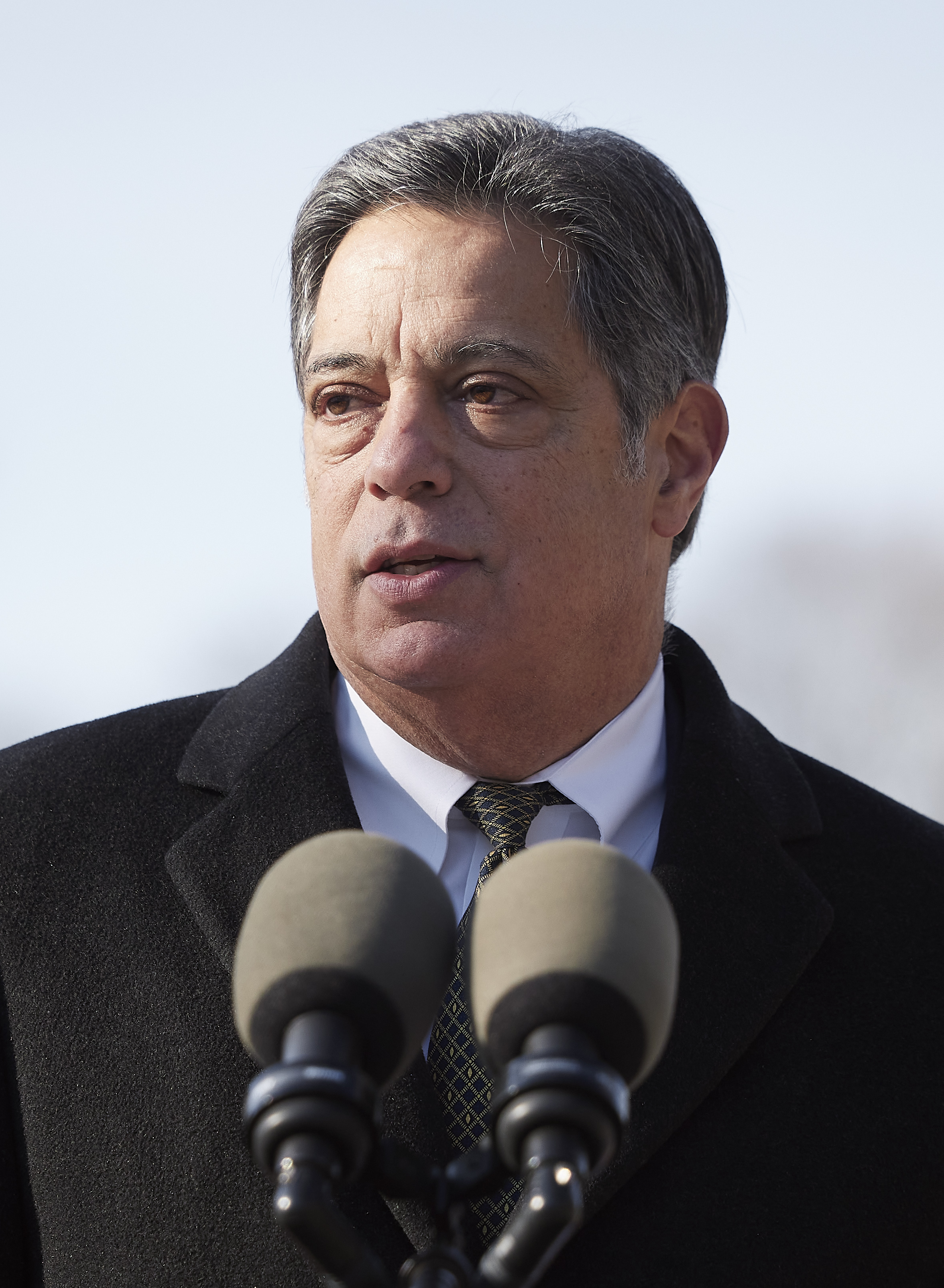
- Costa in 2022

Minority Leader of the Pennsylvania Senate
- Incumbent
- Assumed office January 4, 2011
- Preceded by: Bob Mellow

Member of the Pennsylvania Senate from the 43rd district
- Incumbent
- Assumed office May 13, 1996
- Preceded by: Michael Dawida

Register of Wills of Allegheny County
- In office January 6, 1992 – May 13, 1996
- Preceded by: Rita Wilson Kane
- Succeeded by: Marty Madigan (Acting)^{[a]}

Personal details
- Born: November 17, 1957 (age 68) Pittsburgh, Pennsylvania, U.S.
- Party: Democratic
- Spouse: Roxanne Ross
- Relatives: Paul Costa (brother); Dom Costa (cousin)
- Education: Community College of Allegheny County (AS); Indiana University of Pennsylvania (BA); Duquesne University (JD)
- a.Madigan served as Acting Register of Wills until David Wecht was elected as Costa's permanent successor in 1997.

Jay Costa (born November 17, 1957) is an American politician, currently serving as a member of the Pennsylvania State Senate who has represented the 43rd District since 1996. On November 17, 2010, Senate Democrats elected Costa as their new floor leader, succeeding the retiring Bob Mellow.

== Early life and education ==
Costa grew up in the East Liberty and Squirrel Hill neighborhoods of Pittsburgh. He is the son of former Allegheny County Treasurer Jay Costa, Sr.

Costa attended the Community College of Allegheny County, earning an A.S. degree in Criminology in 1977. He earned a Bachelor of Arts degree from the Indiana University of Pennsylvania where he studied Criminal Justice with the ultimate goal of becoming a police officer, and then earned a Juris Doctor from the Duquesne University School of Law.

Costa's younger brother Paul Costa and cousin Dom Costa are both former members of the Pennsylvania House of Representatives.

== Career ==
Jay Costa began his career after graduating with a bachelor's degree as a Deputy Sheriff of Allegheny County.

In 2013, Costa’s chief of staff, Tony Lepore, testified under oath that Lepore functioned as a “middle man” in a corruption scheme involving awarding lucrative state contracts. As of February 2021, Lepore is still working for Costa.

He is supportive of abortion rights and received a 100% rating from Planned Parenthood in 2013 and 2014.

In May 2019, it was reported that Costa and State Attorney General Josh Shapiro had directed paid communications staffers to edit their Wikipedia pages with positive material.

December 18, 2020, it was let known Jay Costa's law firm received $7,309,100 in PPP (Covid Related Paycheck Protection Program) loans ranking it 7th in all of Pittsburgh.

Early in his career, Costa sponsored a plan to leverage rebates to lower drug costs for seniors.

On February 21, 2021, it was reported that Jay Costa's son, Anthony, and Republican Senate Majority Leader Kim Ward's son, Mike, both work for lobbying firm Cameron Companies which "lobbies on behalf of some of the state’s largest corporations" including 3M.

In a March 12, 2021, ruling, RE: "Gittins v. Gateway Clipper," the defendant represented by Dickie, McCamey & Chilcote of which Jay Costa is a Principal was fined $67,614 for failing to turn over discovery information.

Costa has served on the board of trustees of the University of Pittsburgh and is treasurer of the Community College of Allegheny County board.

== Senate Career ==
For the 2025-2026 Session Costa serves as the Minority Floor Leader and serves on the following committees in the State Senate:

- Rules & Executive Nominations (Minority Chair)
- Appropriations (Ex-Officio)
- Intergovernmental Operations

Pennsylvania State Senate
Preceded by Bob Mellow	Minority Leader of the Pennsylvania Senate; 2011–present	Incumbent
