= Pennsylvania State Senate =

Upper house of the Pennsylvania General Assembly

Coordinates: 40°15′52.9″N 76°53′1.9″W

- Pennsylvania General Assembly

Type
- Type: Upper house
- Term limits: None

History
- Founded: 1790
- New session started: January 7, 2025

Leadership
- President: Austin Davis (D) since January 17, 2023
- President pro tempore: Kim Ward (R) since November 30, 2022
- Majority Leader: Joe Pittman (R) since November 30, 2022
- Minority Leader: Jay Costa (D) since January 4, 2011

Structure
- Seats: 50
- Political groups: Majority: Republican (27); Minority: Democratic (23)
- Length of term: 4 years
- Authority: Article II, Pennsylvania Constitution
- Salary: $102,844/year + per diem

Elections
- Last election: November 5, 2024 (odd-numbered districts)
- Next election: November 3, 2026 (even-numbered districts)
- Redistricting: Bipartisan commission

Meeting place
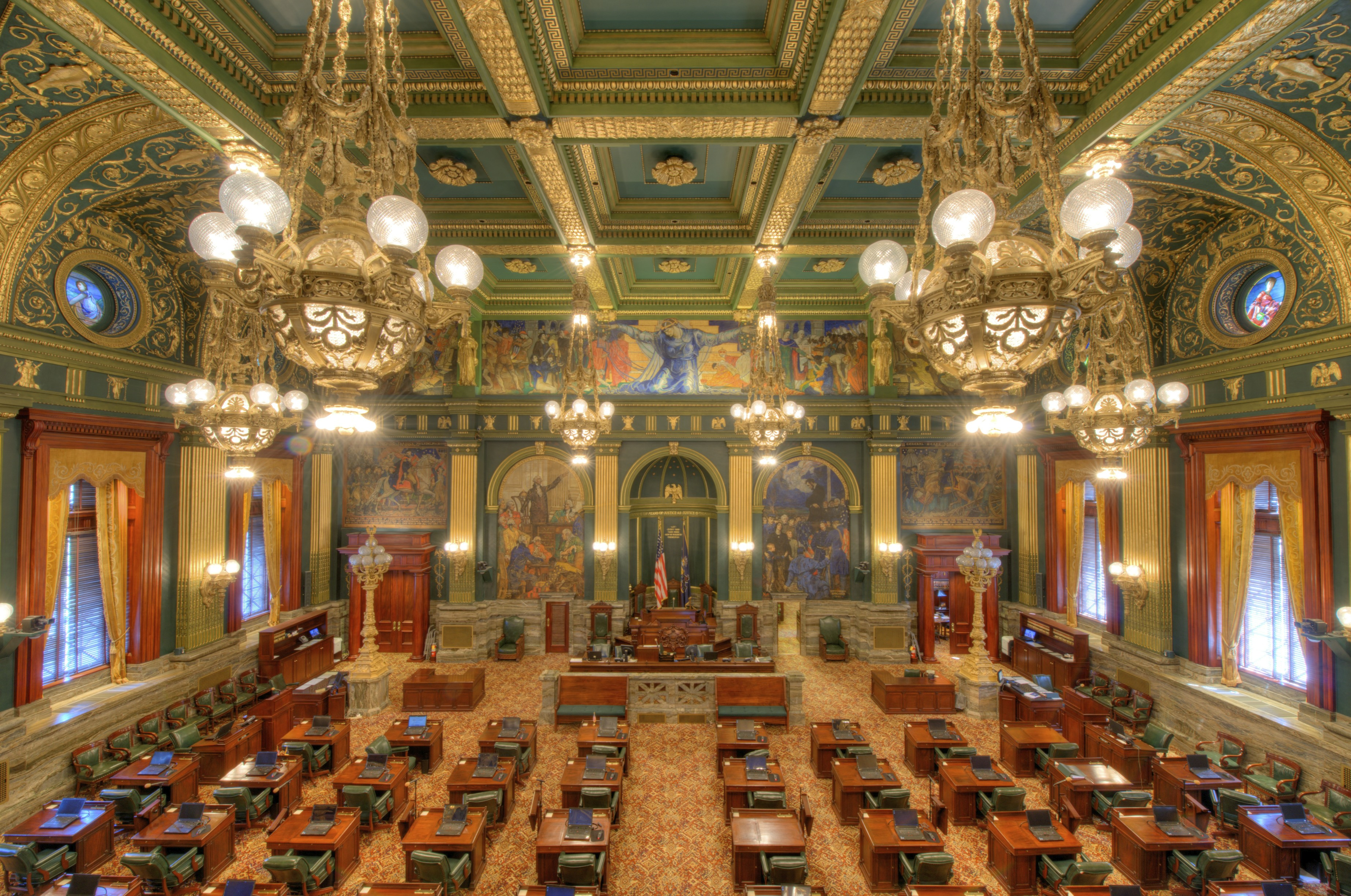
- State Senate Chamber; Pennsylvania State Capitol; Harrisburg, Pennsylvania

Website
- Official website

The Pennsylvania State Senate is the upper house of the bicameral Pennsylvania General Assembly, the state legislature of Pennsylvania. Senators are elected for four-year terms, staggered such that half of the seats are contested every two years. Even- and odd-numbered district seats are contested in separate election years. The State Senate meets in the State Capitol building in Harrisburg and has been meeting since 1791.

The president of the Senate is the lieutenant governor, who has no vote except to break a tie. The president pro tempore becomes the lieutenant governor in the event of the sitting lieutenant governor's removal, resignation, or death. In this case the president pro tempore and lieutenant governor would be the same person.

== Qualifications ==
Senators must be at least 25 years of age. They must be United States citizens, Pennsylvania residents for at least four years, and residents of their district for one year prior to their election. They must also reside in their district during their term.

== Composition ==
=== Historical sessions ===
Affiliation	Party (shading indicates majority caucus)			Total	
Affiliation	Republican	Ind	Democratic	Total	Vacant
1995–1996 session	29	0	21	50	0
1997–1998 session	30	0	20	50	0
1999–2000 session	30	0	20	50	0
2001–2002 session	30	0	20	50	0
2003–2004 session	29	0	21	50	0
2005–2006 session	30	0	20	50	0
2007–2008 session	29	0	21	50	0
2009–2010 session	30	0	20	50	0
2011–2012 session	30	0	20	50	0
2013–2014 session	27	0	23	50	0
2015–2016 session	30	0	20	50	0
2016–2017 session	31	0	19	50	0
2017–2018 session	34	0	16	50	0
2018–2019 session	28	0	22	50	0
2019–2020 session	29	1	21	50	0
2021–2022 session	28	1	21	50	0
2023–2024 session	28	0	22	50	0

=== Current session ===
As of May 5, 2025:

↓
23	27
Democratic	Republican

Affiliation	Party (shading indicates majority caucus)			Total	
Affiliation	Republican	Ind	Democratic	Total	Vacant
End of previous legislature	28	0	22	50	0
January 7, 2025	27	0	22	49	1
May 5, 2025	27	0	23	50	0
Latest voting share	54%	46%			

=== Leadership ===
==== Officers ====
Position	Name
President	Austin Davis
President pro tempore	Kim Ward
Secretary & Parliamentarian	Michael Gerdes
Chief Clerk	Jessica P. Rodic

==== Caucus leadership ====
Majority party (R)	Leadership position	Minority party (D)
Joe Pittman	Floor Leader	Jay Costa
Wayne Langerholc	Whip	Christine Tartaglione
Kristin Phillips-Hill	Caucus Chairperson	Maria Collett
Camera Bartolotta	Caucus Secretary	Steve Santarsiero
Scott Martin	Appropriations Committee Chairperson	Vincent Hughes
Lisa Baker	Caucus Administrator	Judy Schwank
Dave Argall	Policy Committee Chairperson	Nick Miller

== Membership ==
The State Senate comprises 50 senators who are elected by district. In 2012, a State Senate district had an average population of 254,047 residents.

=== List of current senators ===
As of May 5, 2025:

District	Name	Party	Residence	Counties	Start	Next election
1	Nikil Saval	Democratic	Philadelphia	Philadelphia	2020	2028
2	Christine Tartaglione	Democratic	Philadelphia	Philadelphia	1994	2026
3	Sharif Street	Democratic	Philadelphia	Philadelphia	2016	2028
4	Art Haywood	Democratic	Philadelphia	Montgomery, Philadelphia	2014	2026
5	Joe Picozzi	Republican	Philadelphia	Philadelphia	2024	2028
6	Frank Farry	Republican	Langhorne Borough	Bucks	2022	2026
7	Vincent Hughes	Democratic	Philadelphia	Montgomery, Philadelphia	1994	2028
8	Anthony Williams	Democratic	Philadelphia	Delaware, Philadelphia	1998	2026
9	John Kane	Democratic	Birmingham	Chester, Delaware	2020	2028
10	Steve Santarsiero	Democratic	Lower Makefield Township	Bucks	2018	2026
11	Judy Schwank	Democratic	Fleetwood	Berks	2011	2028
12	Maria Collett	Democratic	Lower Gwynedd Township	Montgomery	2018	2026
13	Scott Martin	Republican	West Lampeter Township	Berks, Lancaster	2016	2028
14	Nick Miller	Democratic	Allentown	Lehigh, Northampton	2022	2026
15	Patty Kim	Democratic	Harrisburg	Dauphin	2024	2028
16	Jarrett Coleman	Republican	Upper Macungie Township	Bucks, Lehigh	2022	2026
17	Amanda Cappelletti	Democratic	East Norriton Township	Delaware, Montgomery	2020	2028
18	Lisa Boscola	Democratic	Bethlehem Township	Lehigh, Northampton	1998	2026
19	Carolyn Comitta	Democratic	West Chester	Chester	2020	2028
20	Lisa Baker	Republican	Lehman Township	Luzerne, Pike, Susquehanna, Wayne, Wyoming	2006	2026
21	Scott Hutchinson	Republican	Oil City	Butler, Clarion, Forest, Venango, Warren	2012	2028
22	Marty Flynn	Democratic	Scranton	Lackawanna, Luzerne	2021 (Note: Elected in a special election.)	2026
23	Eugene Yaw	Republican	Loyalsock Township	Bradford, Lycoming, Sullivan, Tioga, Union	2008	2028
24	Tracy Pennycuick	Republican	Harleysville	Berks, Montgomery	2022	2026
25	Cris Dush	Republican	Pine Creek Township	Cameron, Centre, Clinton, Elk, Jefferson, McKean, Potter	2020	2028
26	Tim Kearney	Democratic	Swarthmore	Delaware	2018	2026
27	Lynda Culver	Republican	Sunbury	Columbia, Luzerne, Montour, Northumberland, Snyder	2023	2028
28	Kristin Phillips-Hill	Republican	York Township	York	2018	2026
29	Dave Argall	Republican	Rush Township	Carbon, Luzerne, Schuylkill	2009	2028
30	Judy Ward	Republican	Hollidaysburg	Blair, Fulton, Huntingdon, Juniata, Mifflin	2018	2026
31	Dawn Keefer	Republican	Dillsburg	Cumberland, York	2024	2028
32	Patrick Stefano	Republican	Bullskin Township	Bedford, Fayette, Somerset, Westmoreland	2014	2026
33	Doug Mastriano	Republican	Greene Township	Adams, Franklin	2019	2028
34	Greg Rothman	Republican	Silver Spring Township	Cumberland, Dauphin, Perry	2022	2026
35	Wayne Langerholc	Republican	Johnstown	Cambria County, Centre, Clearfield	2016	2028
36	James Malone	Democratic	East Petersburg	Lancaster	2025	2026
37	Devlin Robinson	Republican	Bridgeville	Allegheny	2020	2028
38	Lindsey Williams	Democratic	West View	Allegheny	2018	2026
39	Kim Ward	Republican	Hempfield Township	Westmoreland	2008	2028
40	Rosemary Brown	Republican	East Stroudsburg	Lackawanna, Monroe, Wayne	2022	2026
41	Joe Pittman	Republican	Indiana	Armstrong, Indiana, Jefferson, Westmoreland	2019	2028
42	Wayne Fontana	Democratic	Pittsburgh	Allegheny	2005	2026
43	Jay Costa	Democratic	Forest Hills	Allegheny	1996	2028
44	Katie Muth	Democratic	East Vincent Township	Berks, Chester, Montgomery	2018	2026
45	Nick Pisciottano	Democratic	West Mifflin	Allegheny	2024	2028
46	Camera Bartolotta	Republican	Monongahela	Beaver, Greene, Washington	2014	2026
47	Elder Vogel	Republican	New Sewickley Township	Beaver, Butler, Lawrence	2008	2028
48	Chris Gebhard	Republican	North Cornwall Township	Berks, Lancaster, Lebanon	2021	2026
49	Dan Laughlin	Republican	Millcreek Township	Erie	2016	2028
50	Michele Brooks	Republican	Jamestown	Crawford, Lawrence, Mercer	2014	2026

== Committees ==
Current committees, majority chairs, minority chairs, and vice chairs include:

Committee name	Majority chair (R)	Minority chair (D)	Vice chair (R)
Aging & Youth	Wayne Langerholc	Maria Collett	Judy Ward
Agriculture & Rural Affairs	Elder Vogel	Judy Schwank	Michele Brooks
Appropriations	Scott Martin	Vincent Hughes	Elder Vogel
Banking & Insurance	Chris Gebhard	Sharif Street	Lisa Baker
Communications & Technology	Tracy Pennycuick	Nick Miller	Kristin Phillips-Hill
Community, Economic & Recreational Development	Rosemary Brown	Anthony H. Williams	Chris Gebhard
Consumer Protection & Professional Licensure	Patrick J. Stefano	Lisa Boscola	Frank Farry
Education	Lynda Schlegel Culver	Lindsey Williams	Doug Mastriano
Environmental Resources & Energy	Gene Yaw	Carolyn Comitta	Scott Hutchinson
Finance	Scott Hutchinson	Nick Pisciottano	Jarrett Coleman
Game & Fisheries	Greg Rothman	Lisa Boscola	Dan Laughlin
Health & Human Services	Michele Brooks	Art Haywood	Lynda Schlegel Culver
Institutional Sustainability & Innovation	Frank Farry	Tim Kearney	Dave Argall
Intergovernmental Operations	Jarrett Coleman	Christine Tartaglione	Cris Dush
Judiciary	Lisa Baker	Amanda Cappelletti	Gene Yaw
Labor & Industry	Devlin Robinson	John I. Kane	Camera Bartolotta
Law & Justice	Dan Laughlin	Wayne D. Fontana	Joe Picozzi
Local Government	Dawn Keefer	Patty Kim	Rosemary Brown
Rules & Executive Nominations	Joe Pittman	Jay Costa	Wayne Langerholc
State Government	Cris Dush	Steve Santarsiero	Patrick J. Stefano
Transportation	Judy Ward	Marty Flynn	Devlin Robinson
Urban Affairs & Housing	Joe Picozzi	Nikil Saval	Dawn Keefer
Veterans Affairs & Emergency Preparednesss	Doug Mastriano	Katie Muth	Tracy Pennycuick

== See also ==
- Pennsylvania House of Representatives
- List of Pennsylvania state legislatures

== Sources ==
- Trostle, Sharon, ed. (2009). The Pennsylvania Manual. Vol. 119. Harrisburg: Pennsylvania Department of General Services. ISBN 978-0-8182-0334-3.
