= Tanger Outlets Pittsburgh =

Coordinates: 40°12′59.5″N 80°12′43.4″W

- Location: Washington, Pennsylvania, U.S.
- Opened: August 29, 2008
- Developer: Tanger Outlets
- Manager: Tanger Outlets
- Public transit: Freedom Transit bus: County Line, Metro Commuter Saturday
- Website: http://www.tangeroutlet.com/pittsburgh/

Tanger Outlets Pittsburgh, also called Tanger Outlets Washington is an open-air outlet mall in South Strabane Township in Washington County, Pennsylvania owned by Tanger Factory Outlet Centers. It is within the Greater Pittsburgh metropolitan area. It is located on Race Track Road off Interstate 79 in Pennsylvania in a 122 acres (49 ha) development called Victory Center. It was supported by the Redevelopment Authority of the County of Washington.

The development process for what would become the outlets began in 2000. The site was chosen for its access from Interstate 79, proximity to The Meadows Racetrack and Casino, and for having sufficient distance from Grove City Premium Outlets. It is approximately 70 miles (110 km) south of its largest rival, the Grove City Premium Outlets.

The facility was built with the support of tax-increment financing procedure. The financing deal with Trinity Area School District and the Washington County, Pennsylvania was controversial. Prior to approval, an anonymous opposition group spent $100,000 in a single week on direct mail, road signs, telephone solicitations, a Web site, and newspaper advertisements. The tax-increment financing included a Bass Pro Shops.
