= Pennsylvania House of Representatives, District 48 =

American legislative district

Pennsylvania's 48th State House of Representatives district
Representative
Tim O'Neal; R–South Strabane Township
- Population (2022): 65,851

The 48th Pennsylvania House of Representatives District is located in southwest Pennsylvania and has been represented by Tim O'Neal since 2018.

== District profile ==
The 48th District is located in Washington County and includes the following areas:

- Amwell Township
- Carroll Township (part)
  - District 03
  - District 04
  - District 05
- Donora
- East Finley Township
- East Washington
- Fallowfield Township
- Green Hills
- Morris Township
- North Franklin Township
- North Strabane Township (part)
  - District 01
  - District 02
  - District 03
  - District 04
  - District 05
- Nottingham Township
- Somerset Township
- South Franklin Township
- South Strabane Township
- Washington
- West Finley Township

== Representatives ==
Representative	Party	Years	District home	Note
Prior to 1969, seats were apportioned by county.
Austin J. Murphy	Democrat	1969 – 1970		Elected to the Pennsylvania State Senate
Barry Stout	Democrat	1971 – 1976	Bentleyville	Elected to the Pennsylvania State Senate
David Sweet	Democrat	1977 – 1988		
Anthony L. Colaizzo	Democrat	1989 – 1998		
Timothy J. Solobay	Democrat	1999 – 2010		Elected to the Pennsylvania State Senate
Brandon P. Neuman	Democrat	2011 – 2017		Elected Washington County Common Pleas Court judge
Tim O'Neal	Republican	2018 – present		

== Recent election results ==
PA House election, 2024: Pennsylvania House, District 48
Party	Candidate	Votes	%
Republican	Tim O'Neal (incumbent)	Unopposed	
Total votes		24,213	100.00
Republican hold			

PA House election, 2022: Pennsylvania House, District 48
Party	Candidate	Votes	%
Republican	Tim O'Neal (incumbent)	Unopposed	
Total votes		20,085	100.00
Republican hold			

PA House election, 2020: Pennsylvania House, District 48
Party	Candidate	Votes	%
Republican	Tim O'Neal (incumbent)	20,571	58.41
Democratic	Harlan Shober, Jr.	14,646	41.59
Total votes		35,217	100.00
Republican hold			

PA House election, 2018: Pennsylvania House, District 48
Party	Candidate	Votes	%
Republican	Tim O'Neal (incumbent)	13,597	55.71
Democratic	Clark Mitchell, Jr.	10,808	44.29
Total votes		24,405	100.00
Republican hold			

PA House special election, 2018: Pennsylvania House, District 48
Party	Candidate	Votes	%
Republican	Tim O'Neal	5,615	54.57
Democratic	Clark Mitchell, Jr.	4,512	43.85
Libertarian	Demosthenes Agoris	162	1.57
Total votes		10,289	100.00
Republican gain from Democratic			

PA House election, 2016: Pennsylvania House, District 48
Party	Candidate	Votes	%
Democratic	Brandon Neuman (incumbent)	Unopposed	
Total votes		21,335	100.00
Democratic hold			
