= Washington Crown Center =

Franklin Crossroads Park
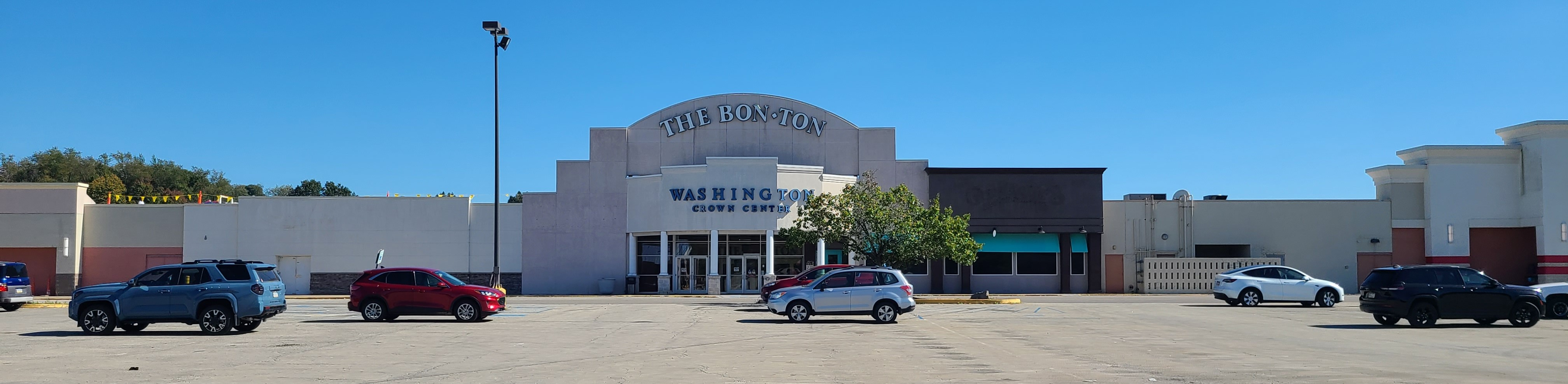
- The mall's former northern entrance in October 2025
- Location: Washington, Pennsylvania, U.S.
- Coordinates: 40°9′34″N 80°16′34″W
- Address: 1500 West Chestnut Street
- Opened: 1969
- Closed: 2026 (indoor)
- Previous names: Franklin Mall (1969–1999), Washington Crown Center (1999–2026)
- Developer: Crown American
- Num. of stores: 30+
- Num. of anchor tenants: 4 (October 2023), 3 vacant
- Floor area: 676,136 square feet (63,000 m^{2})
- Floors: 1
- Public transit: Freedom Transit bus: Local B, Local Saturday
- Website: shopwashingtoncrown.com

Franklin Crossroads Park, formerly Franklin Mall and Washington Crown Center, is a 676,000-square-foot regional mixed-use shopping mall and industrial center in North Franklin Township, Washington County, Pennsylvania. The mall's anchor stores are MAC.BID, Ollie's Bargain Outlet and Rural King. There are two vacant anchors that were once The Bon-Ton and Hollywood Theaters. A third former anchor, Sears, has been filled by a Chrysler-Dodge-Jeep-Ram dealer, and a Mitsubishi dealer.

== History ==
The mall opened in 1969 as Franklin Mall, with Troutman's, Sears, and Grant City (which was replaced by Hills in 1976) as its anchors. An Acme supermarket was also located in the mall, which closed in 1977. Troutman's closed in 1984 and was sold to Pomeroy's, which in turn converted to The Bon-Ton in 1987. A 1985 expansion to the mall added Hess's and a new Hills, while converting the original Hills location to a food court and additional retail space.

In 1999, the mall was renamed Washington Crown Center and underwent a renovation. Among the changes were the addition of a movie theater on the site of the former Hess's, the conversion of the Hills space for use by Ames, and the addition of Kaufmann's as a fourth anchor. The Ames store closed in 2002 and was replaced by Gander Mountain in 2003, while Kaufmann's was converted to Macy's in 2006. In 2013, Marshalls replaced the vacant Old Navy space, as Old Navy had moved up to Tanger Outlets Pittsburgh. In 2014, Ross Dress for Less took 25,000 square feet of former specialty retail shop space. The trend of replacing small shops with big box stores continued through 2014 with the addition of Jo-Ann Fabrics, Ulta, and Books-A-Million. In January 2015, PREIT announced that it was planning on selling Washington Crown Center along with four other malls.

In August 2016, PREIT sold the mall to Kohan Retail Investment Group for $20 million. It was reported that occupancy had dropped to 87.4% before the sale. Macy's and Gander Mountain closed in 2017. Gander Mountain would be replaced by Rural King in March 2018. The Bon-Ton closed all locations by August 2018. On August 31, 2019, it was announced that Sears would be closing this location as a part of a plan to close 92 stores nationwide. The store closed on December 15, 2019. This was the last remaining Sears store in western Pennsylvania (not counting Sears Hometown and Outlet Stores).

On October 3, 2020, Hollywood Theaters announced it would be closing all of its locations permanently due to the COVID-19 pandemic. Ross Dress for Less closed on January 19, 2021. This left Rural King and Marshalls as the only anchor stores. Ulta Beauty moved to a nearby shopping center in April 2021. Mac Discount, an online auctioneer reselling returned merchandise from mainstream retailers, has been operating from a portion of the former Macy's location as of December 2021.

A new car dealership, Crown Chrysler, Dodge, Jeep, & Ram Trucks, would take the majority of the former Sears lot in June 2023. Ollie's Bargain Outlet would open inside the former Ross Dress for Less on October 18, 2023. Later, in 2025, a Mitsubishi dealership claimed the remaining Sears space.

As of June 2025, an industrial company was in talks to purchase the mall. In September 2025, PREP Funds, based in Cleveland, and Los Angeles-based Industrial Realty Group acquired the mall in North Franklin Township, Washington County, according to an announcement. It will be renamed Franklin Crossroads Park and undergo a $40 million transformation into a mixed-use site with a retail center on the eastern side of the property and a business park on the west.

As of September 2025, there are plans for demolition of the movie theater and Bon-Ton department store. The car dealerships, Rural King, Ollie's, and Mac Discount will continue in their current locations, but the Marshalls at this location has since closed and reopened at a new location.

In March 2026, Washington Crown Center announced that the building would close to mall walkers on March 30 while redevelopment work continued. Access to part of the mall's common area remained available, and several businesses continued to operate. As part of the redevelopment, portions of the former mall were demolished and the property was redeveloped as Franklin Crossroads Park. In August 2026, Industrial Realty Group and PREP Funds described the property as a former indoor mall.
