= Tanger (disambiguation) =

Tanger is the French spelling of Tangier, sometimes called Tangiers, a city in Morocco.

Tanger may also refer to:

== Geography ==
- Tanger (river), a tributary to the Elbe in Germany
- Tanger-Med, a Moroccan cargo port

== People ==
- Helen Tanger (born 1978), Dutch Olympic rower
- Stanley Tanger (1923–2010), U.S. businessman and philanthropist
- Kris Letang (born 1987), Canadian ice hockey player, popularly nicknamed "Tanger"

== Sports ==
- Atletico Tanger, a Moroccan football club
- IR Tanger, a Moroccan football club

== Other uses ==
- Louise Arnold Tanger Arboretum, an arboretum in Lancaster, Pennsylvania, U.S.
- Steven Tanger Center for the Performing Arts in Greensboro, North Carolina, U.S.
- Tanger Factory Outlet Centers, a U.S. real estate company
  - Tanger Outlets The Walk, an open-air mall in Atlantic City, New Jersey, U.S.
- Tanger Family Bicentennial Garden, a public garden in Greensboro, North Carolina, U.S.
