= Franklin Mall (disambiguation) =

Franklin Mall is a shopping mall in Philadelphia, Pennsylvania.

Franklin Mall may also refer to:

- Washington Crown Center, formerly Franklin Mall, a shopping mall in North Franklin Township, Washington County, Pennsylvania
- Franklin P. Mall (1862–1917), American anatomist and pathologist
- Franklin Park Mall, a shopping mall in Toledo, Ohio
