= Washington City Transit =

Pennsylvania bus company

Freedom Transit (formerly Washington City Transit)
- Parent: Washington County Transportation Authority
- Headquarters: 50 East Chestnut Street in Washington, Pennsylvania
- Service area: Washington County, Pennsylvania
- Service type: Bus
- Routes: 4
- Fuel type: Diesel
- Operator: First Transit
- Website: www.freedom-transit.org

Freedom Transit (formerly 'Washington City Transit') is the designation for the public transit agency that provides bus services in the urbanized portion of central and northern Washington County, Pennsylvania.

== Description ==
Local bus routes operated by this system are designed to serve Washington, Pennsylvania, an edge city and a key location of both business parks and shopping amenities. The "Metro" bus route provides access from the Washington County suburbs to Downtown Pittsburgh. The Metro bus route makes stops in Washington, Houston and Canonsburg, serving central and northern Washington County, traveling ten times per weekday in each direction to Downtown Pittsburgh. The Metro service also stops at designated park and ride locations. More limited bus service is offered on Saturdays, with service to the South Hills "T" Transit Center.

In July 2015, Washington City Transit merged into the Washington County Transportation Authority. The combined agency now operates bus service using the name Freedom Transit.

== Routes ==
- Local B Route: Trinity Point-Strabane Square-Downtown Washington-Washington Crown Center Mall: Washington, South Strabane Township
- Local A Route Hospital-Jefferson Ave-Downtown Washington-Washington Park: Washington, North Franklin Township
- County Line: McDonald Borough, Muse, Canonsburg, Houston Borough, The Meadows Racetrack and Casino, Tanger Outlets, Arden (Fairgrounds, PA Trolley Museum), Downtown Washington
- Pittsburgh Metro Commuter: Washington, South Strabane, Meadowlands, Houston Borough, Canonsburg, Southpointe (Cecil Township) to Downtown Pittsburgh

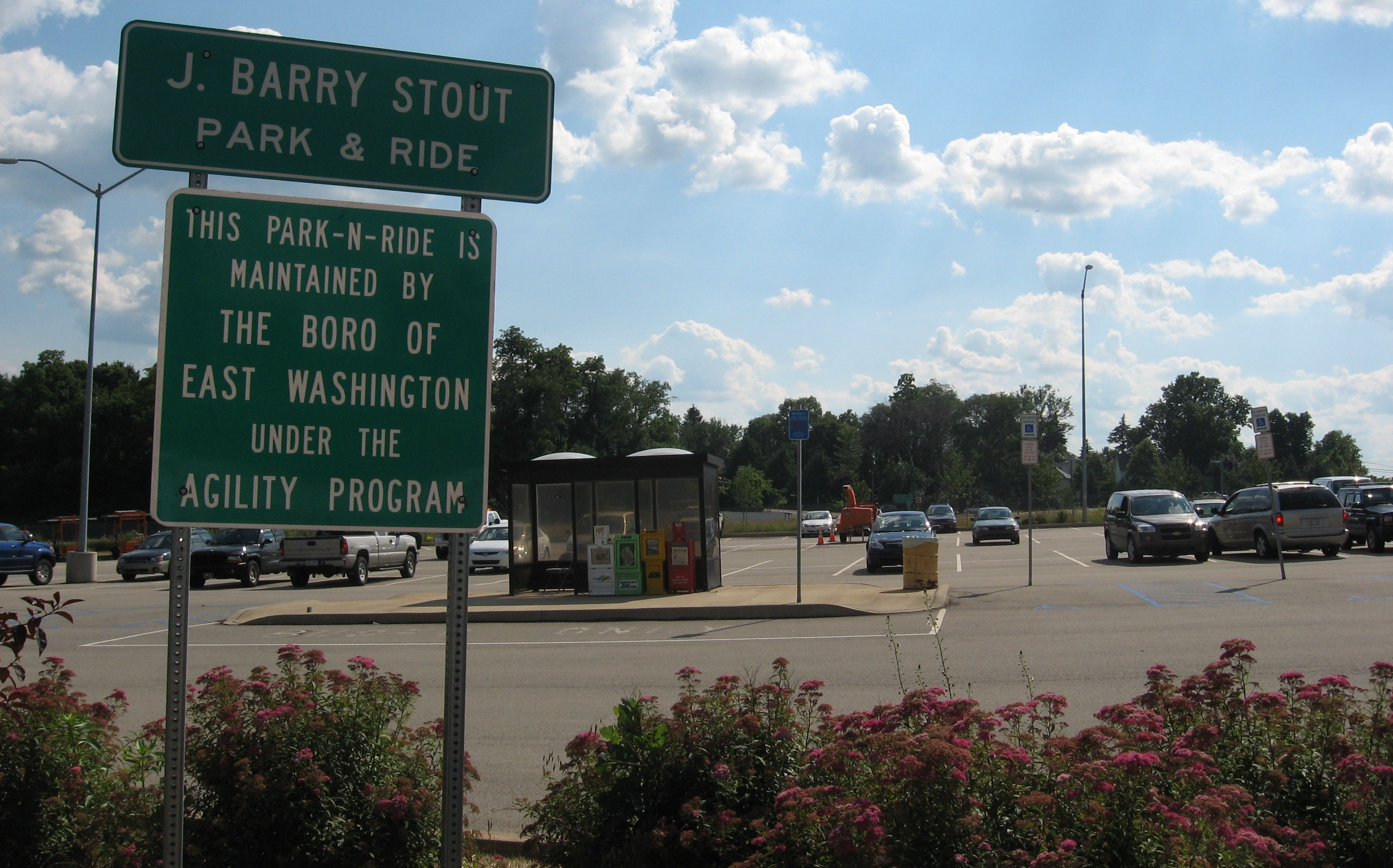
WCT commuter buses serve the J. Barry Stout Park and Ride at Trinity Point in South Strabane Township.

== Park & Ride Lots ==
- Jessop Place (Canton Township)- 69 spaces (Commuter, Commuter Express)
- Southpointe (Cecil Township)- 129 spaces (Commuter Express)
- Trinity Point (South Strabane)- 224 spaces (Commuter)
