= Senator Stout =

Senator Stout may refer to:

- Barry Stout (1936–2016), Pennsylvania State Senate
- Byron G. Stout (1829–1896), Michigan State Senate
- Jacob Stout (1764–1855), Delaware State Senate
- James Huff Stout (1848–1910), Wisconsin State Senate
- Lansing Stout (1828–1871), Oregon State Senate
- Richard R. Stout (1912–1986), New Jersey State Senate
- Tom Stout (1879–1965), Montana State Senate
