= Tangier (disambiguation) =

Tangier is a city in Morocco.

Tangier or Tangiers may also refer to:

== Entertainment ==
- Tangier (1946 film), a black-and-white Universal Pictures film
- Tangier (1982 film), an American-Moroccan film
- Tangiers, a fictional casino in the 1995 film Casino
- Tangier (band), an American hard rock, glam metal and southern rock band
- Tangier (album), a 2010 album by Billy Thorp
- Tangiers (band), a Canadian indie rock band

== Places ==
- Tangier, Nova Scotia, a rural town in Nova Scotia, Canada
- Tangier, Indiana, an unincorporated community in Indiana, U.S.
- Tangier, Oklahoma, an unincorporated community in Oklahoma, U.S.
- Tangier, Virginia, a town on Tangier Island in the Chesapeake Bay in Virginia, U.S.
- Tangier Sound, an inlet of the Chesapeake Bay in Maryland, U.S.

== Ships ==
- USS Tangier (SP-469), a patrol vessel in commission from 1917 to 1918
- USS Tangier (AV-8), a seaplane tender in commission from 1941 to 1947

== See also ==
- English Tangier, a colony from 1661 to 1684
- Tanger (disambiguation)
- Tangier disease, a rare inherited disorder
- Tangier International Zone, city-state under international administration between 1924 and 1956
- USS Tangier, a list of ships
