= North Franklin Township =

North Franklin Township may refer to:

- North Franklin Township, Franklin County, Nebraska, in Franklin County, Nebraska
- North Franklin Township, Pennsylvania
