= Colaizzo =

Colaizzo is a surname. Notable people with the surname include:

- Anthony Colaizzo (1930–2019), American politician
- Paul Downs Colaizzo (born 1985), American playwright, screenwriter, and film director
