= Austin Murphy =

American politician (1927–2024)

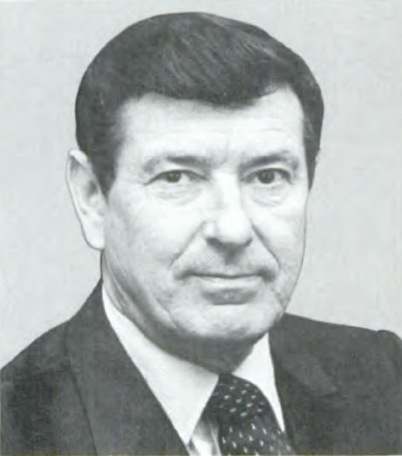
- Official portrait, 1990

Member of the U.S. House of Representatives from Pennsylvania
- In office January 3, 1977 – January 3, 1995
- Preceded by: Thomas E. Morgan
- Succeeded by: Frank Mascara
- Constituency: 22nd district (1977–1993); 20th district (1993–1995)

Member of the Pennsylvania Senate from the 46th district
- In office January 5, 1971 – January 4, 1977
- Preceded by: William J. Lane
- Succeeded by: Barry Stout

Member of the Pennsylvania House of Representatives
- In office January 6, 1959 – November 30, 1968
- Constituency: Washington County
- In office January 7, 1969 – November 19, 1970
- Preceded by: Constituency established
- Succeeded by: Barry Stout
- Constituency: 48th district

Personal details
- Born: Austin John Murphy Jr. June 17, 1927 North Charleroi, Pennsylvania, U.S.
- Died: April 13, 2024 (aged 96) Carroll Township, Washington County, Pennsylvania, U.S.
- Party: Democratic
- Spouse: Eileen Ramona McNamara (m. 1953; died 2016)
- Children: 7
- Education: Duquesne University (BA); University of Pittsburgh (LLB)

Military service
- Branch/service: United States Marine Corps
- Years of service: 1944–1946 (active); 1948–1951 (reserve)
- Unit: United States Marine Corps Reserve

Austin John Murphy Jr. (June 17, 1927 – April 13, 2024) was an American politician who served as a member of the Pennsylvania House of Representatives from 1959 to 1968 representing Washington County, Pennsylvania and again representing Pennsylvania House of Representatives, District 48 from 1969 to 1970, a member of the Pennsylvania Senate representing Pennsylvania Senate, District 46 from 1971 to 1977, and a member of the United States House of Representatives for nine terms from 1977 to 1995. He was a member of the Democratic Party.

== Personal life ==
Born in North Charleroi, Pennsylvania, to Austin John Murphy Sr. and the former Evelyn F. Spence, Murphy grew up in the town of New London, Connecticut. He later returned to Charleroi and served in the United States Marine Corps from 1944 to 1946. He earned a Bachelor of Arts at Duquesne University in 1949 and a Bachelor of Laws at the University of Pittsburgh in 1952 and was admitted to the Pennsylvania bar in 1953. He practiced law in Washington, Pennsylvania, and was an assistant district attorney for Washington County before he was elected to the Pennsylvania House of Representatives in 1958.

Murphy married Eileen Ramona McNamara Murphy on March 1, 1953, and they had seven children and 19 grandchildren. Mona died on March 1, 2016 in while visiting their daughter's family in Spring Valley, Nevada, a census-designated place near Las Vegas. Austin died on April 13, 2024, at age 96.

== Political career ==
Murphy started his political career as a member of the Pennsylvania House of Representatives, where he served from 1959 to 1971. He then served in the Pennsylvania State Senate from 1971 to 1977. In 1976, he was elected to the United States House of Representatives, replacing longtime incumbent Thomas E. Morgan. He served as a delegate to the Democratic National Convention in the years 1984 and 1988.

=== Scandals ===
Murphy was reprimanded by the 100th United States Congress in December 1987 for ghost voting and misusing House funds. He diverted government resources to his former law firm, had a ghost employee on his House payroll and had someone else cast votes for him in the House. The scandal ultimately led to his decision not to seek reelection in 1994.

In May 1999, Murphy was indicted by a Fayette County, Pennsylvania grand jury of engaging in voter fraud. He was charged with forgery, criminal conspiracy, and tampering with public records. Murphy insisted that he was only trying to help elderly nursing home residents fill out paperwork that accompanied an absentee ballot. According to the grand jury, Murphy and two others forged absentee ballots for residents of the nursing home and then added Murphy's wife, Eileen Murphy, as a write-in candidate for township election official. The next month, following closed-door negotiations, all but one of the voter fraud charges were dropped. Following the hearing, he left the building by a back door to avoid an angry crowd outside. He was sentenced to six months probation and fifty hours of community service.

== Death ==
Murphy died on April 13, 2024 in Carroll Township, Washington County, Pennsylvania, age 96. He was interred at Howe Cemetery in Long Branch, Pennsylvania.

== See also ==
- List of American federal politicians convicted of crimes
- List of federal political scandals in the United States
- List of United States representatives expelled, censured, or reprimanded

U.S. House of Representatives
Preceded by Thomas Morgan	Member of the U.S. House of Representatives from Pennsylvania's 22nd congressional district 1977–1993	Constituency abolished
Preceded by Joseph Gaydos	Member of the U.S. House of Representatives from Pennsylvania's 20th congressional district 1993–1995	Succeeded by Frank Mascara
