= Tim O'Neal (politician) =

American politician

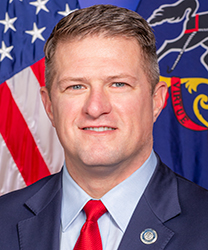

Republican Whip of the Pennsylvania House of Representatives
- Incumbent
- Assumed office December 1, 2022
- Leader: Bryan Cutler
- Preceded by: Donna Oberlander

Member of the Pennsylvania House of Representatives from the 48th district
- Incumbent
- Assumed office June 5, 2018
- Preceded by: Brandon Neuman

Personal details
- Born: November 28, 1980 (age 45)
- Party: Republican
- Spouse: Julia O'Neal
- Website: Rep. Tim O'Neal

Timothy O'Neal, a Republican, represents the 48th district in the Pennsylvania House of Representatives. He was first elected following a special election in May 2018. He was sworn in on June 5, 2018.

== Committee assignments ==
- Appropriations
- Environmental Resources & Energy
- Insurance
- Veterans Affairs & Emergency Preparedness
