= Doak–Little House =

Historic house in Pennsylvania, United States

- U.S. National Register of Historic Places
- Washington County History & Landmarks Foundation Landmark
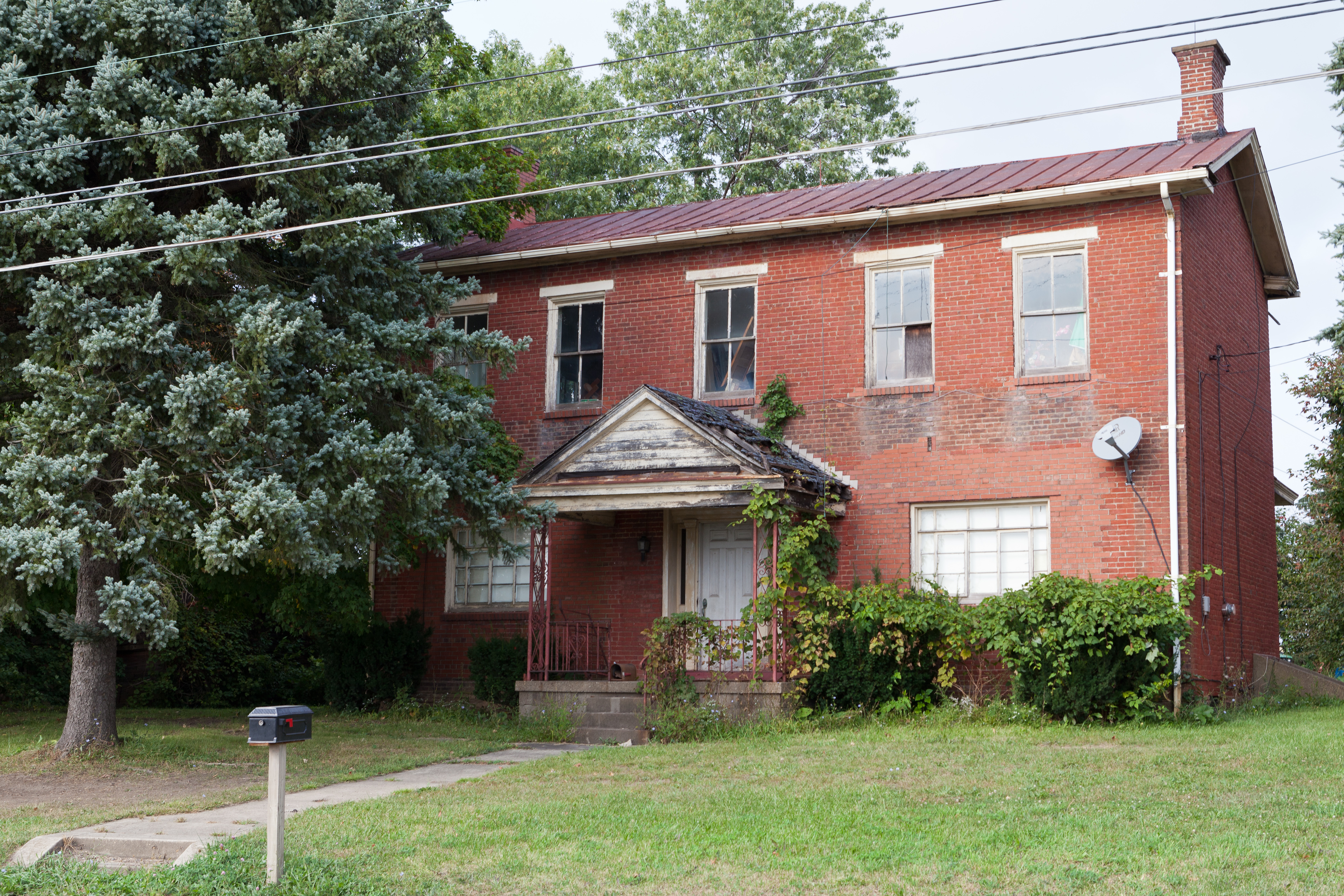

- Location within Pennsylvania Location within the United States
- Location: US 40 .5 mi. W of S. Strabane, South Strabane Township, Pennsylvania
- Coordinates: 40°8′34″N 80°10′26″W
- Area: less than one acre
- Built: 1850
- Architectural style: Greek Revival
- MPS: National Road in Pennsylvania MPS
- NRHP reference No.: 96001211
- Added to NRHP: April 15, 1996

The Doak–Little House is a historic building in South Strabane Township, Pennsylvania.

It is designated as a historic residential landmark/farmstead by the Washington County History & Landmarks Foundation.
