= Washington Trust Building =

- Washington Trust Company Building
- U.S. National Register of Historic Places
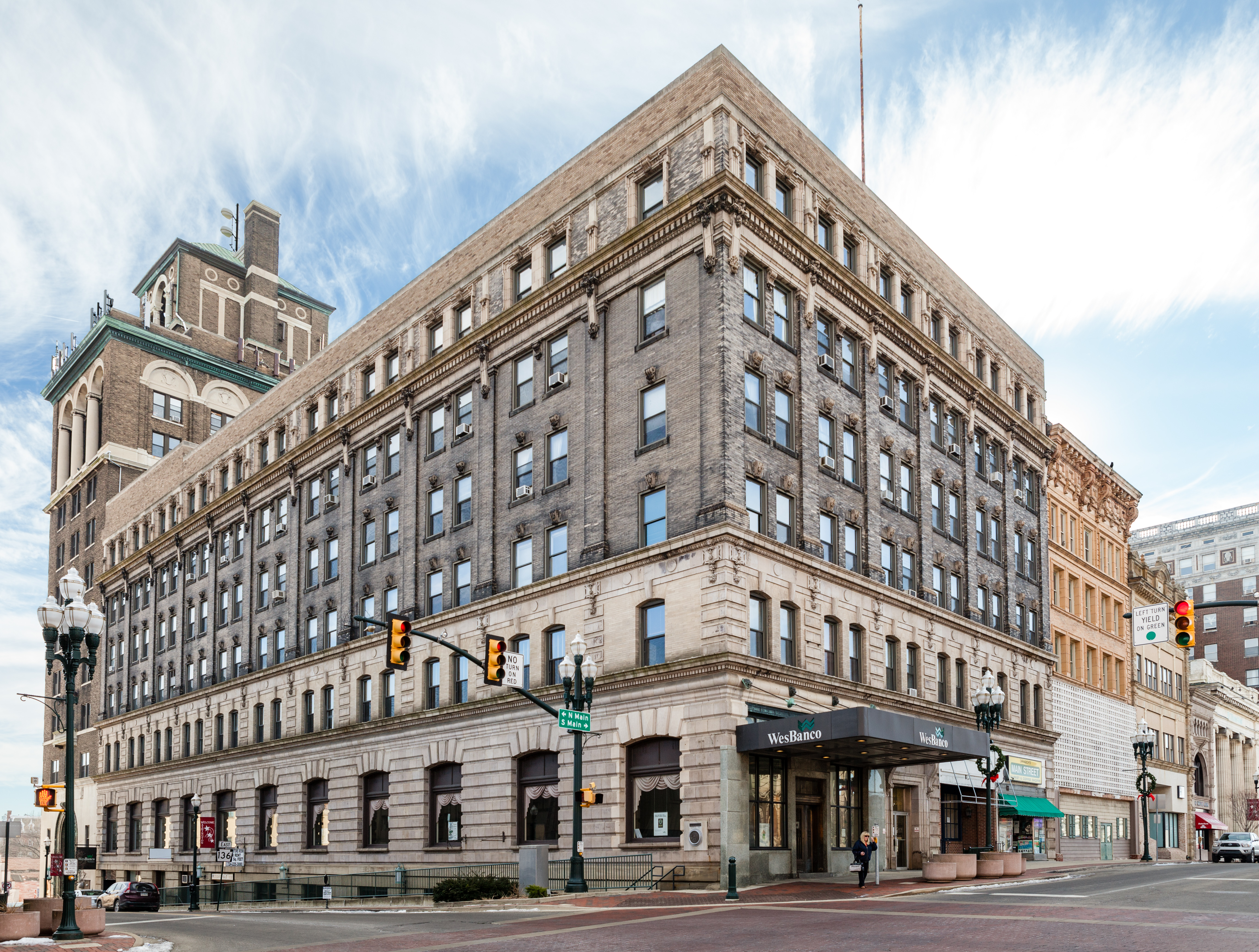
- Washington Trust Building from Main Street

- Location within Pennsylvania
- Location: 6 S. Main Street, Washington, Pennsylvania
- Coordinates: 40°10′15″N 80°14′43″W
- Built: 1903
- Built by: Golden and Crick
- Architectural style: Beaux Arts
- NRHP reference No.: 14001133
- Added to NRHP: January 7, 2015

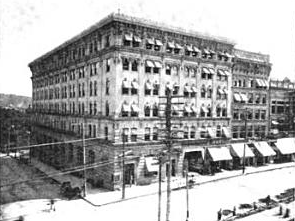
Washington Trust Building in 1908, as viewed from Main Street

The Washington Trust Company Building is a Beaux Arts-style commercial building that is located in the central downtown area of Washington, Pennsylvania.

== History and architectural features ==
The original 1903 section of the building is six stories tall; the 1927 addition is ten stories. At the start of 2015, this historic structure was the largest commercial building in Washington.

The original portion of the building was completed in 1903 as the headquarters of the Washington Trust Company, formed by acquisitions and mergers of other financial institutions in 1901. The trust company needed grow from its original rented space in the Swan Building as the banking sector in the area was expanding due to the increase in coal and oil extraction activities. The first floor of the new building housed the bank; professionals including doctors, engineers, insurance and real estate agents occupying the upper floors. Its proximity to the county Courthouse on the opposite side of Main Street made the building a popular address for legal professionals as well.

The trust company closed in 1931 when it failed to survive the Great Depression. The building was owned by a succession of banks and was sold to a development group in 2013. Even though, as with many smaller cities, the downtown area of Washington suffers from low occupancy, the Washington Trust Company is still home to many of the town's professional offices, as well as a bank on the first floor.

In 2012, the Washington County Redevelopment Authority announced Trek Development's development plans for the building, including commercial space, retail, and up to 44 apartments.
