= Thomas Munce House =

Historic house in Pennsylvania, United States

- U.S. National Register of Historic Places
- Washington County History & Landmarks Foundation Landmark
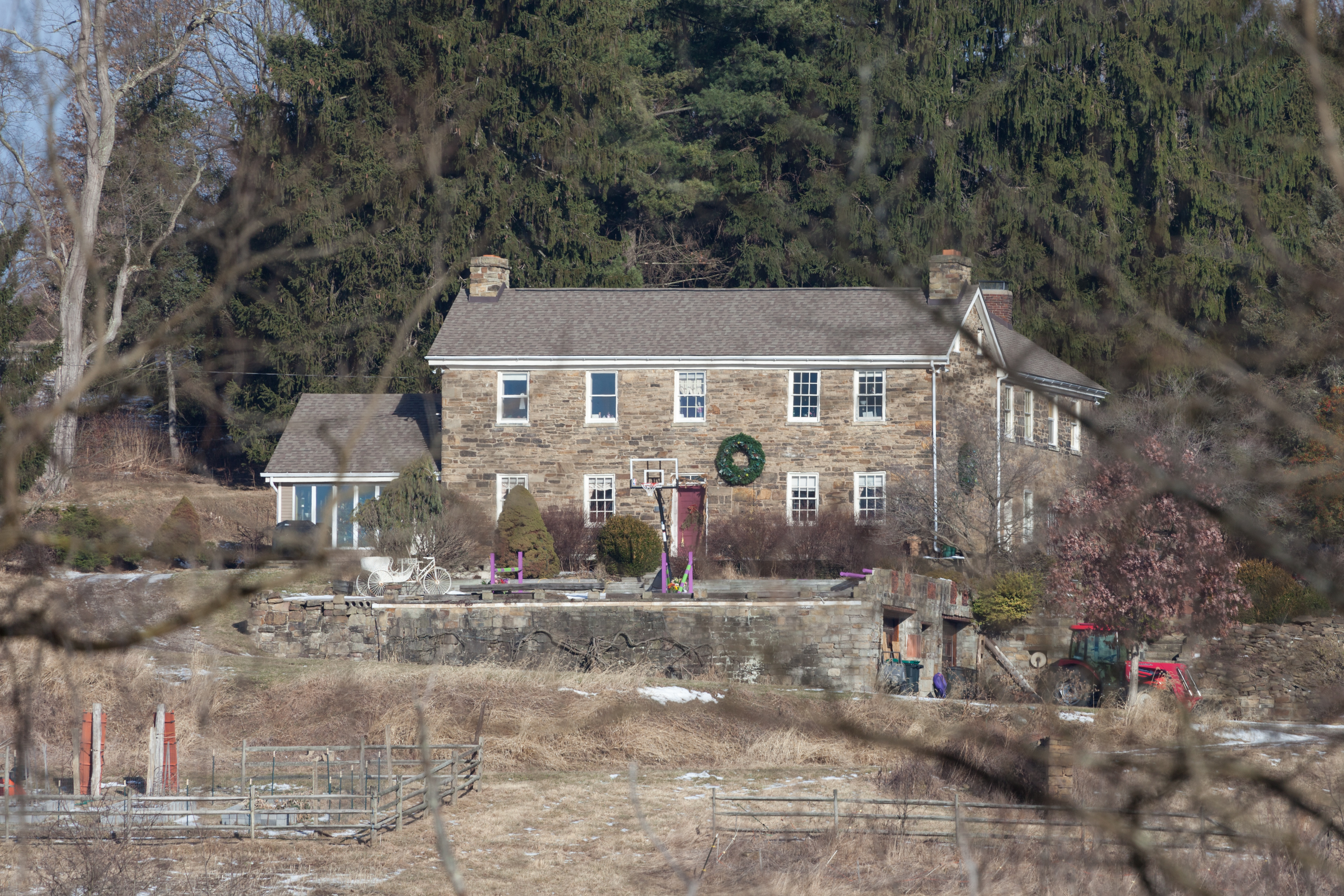
- The house in January 2015

- Location within Pennsylvania Location within the United States
- Nearest city: Washington, Pennsylvania, United States
- Coordinates: 40°11′13″N 80°10′48″W
- Area: less than one acre
- Built: 1794
- Architectural style: Georgian
- NRHP reference No.: 96000710
- Added to NRHP: June 28, 1996

The Thomas Munce House is a historic house located in South Strabane Township, Pennsylvania, United States.

== History and architectural features ==
The earliest section of this historic structure was built circa 1794 with additions completed circa 1810 and 1835. The house is a 2 1/2-story, stone, vernacular, Georgian-influenced structure with a gabled roof and a façade with five openings. It is representative of the more substantial, second-generation houses built to replace earlier log houses in Washington County.

It was designated as a historic residential landmark/farmstead by the Washington County History & Landmarks Foundation, and is listed on the National Register of Historic Places.
