= Barry Stout =

American politician

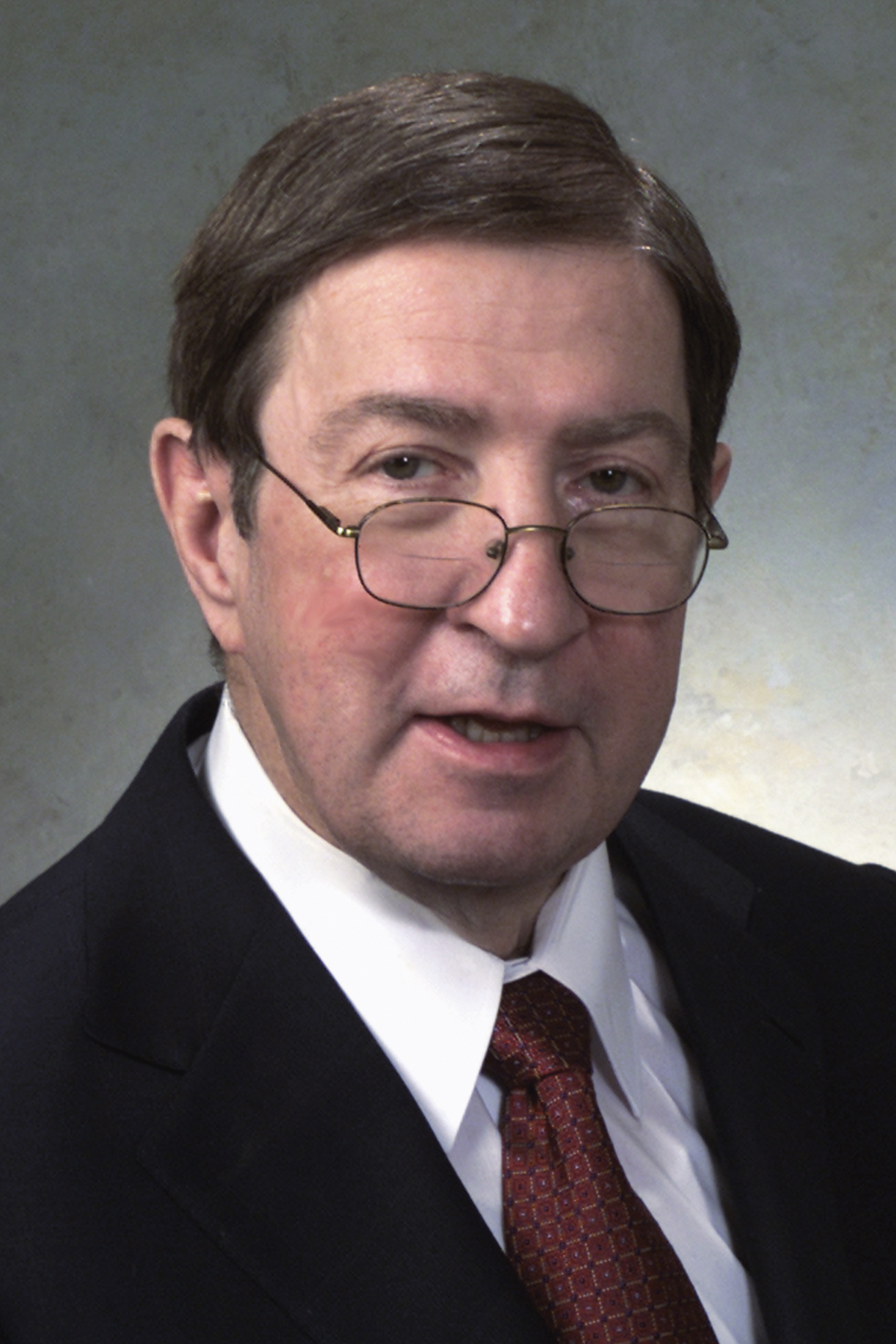

Member of the Pennsylvania Senate from the 46th district
- In office June 7, 1977 – November 30, 2010
- Preceded by: Austin Murphy
- Succeeded by: Tim Solobay
- Constituency: Parts of Greene, Fayette, Washington, Beaver, and Westmoreland Counties.

Member of the Pennsylvania House of Representatives from the 48th district
- In office January 5, 1971 – November 16, 1976
- Preceded by: Austin J. Murphy
- Succeeded by: David Sweet

Personal details
- Born: November 7, 1936 East Finley Township, Pennsylvania
- Died: October 29, 2016 (aged 79) Bentleyville, Pennsylvania
- Party: Democratic
- Spouse: Lenore A. Stout
- Education: Washington & Jefferson College

J. Barry Stout (November 7, 1936 – October 29, 2016) was an American politician. A member of the Democratic Party, he served in the Pennsylvania State Senate representing the 46th District after winning a special election in May 1977. He represented the district through 2010. He was also a member of the Pennsylvania House of Representatives from 1970 through 1976.

== Biography ==
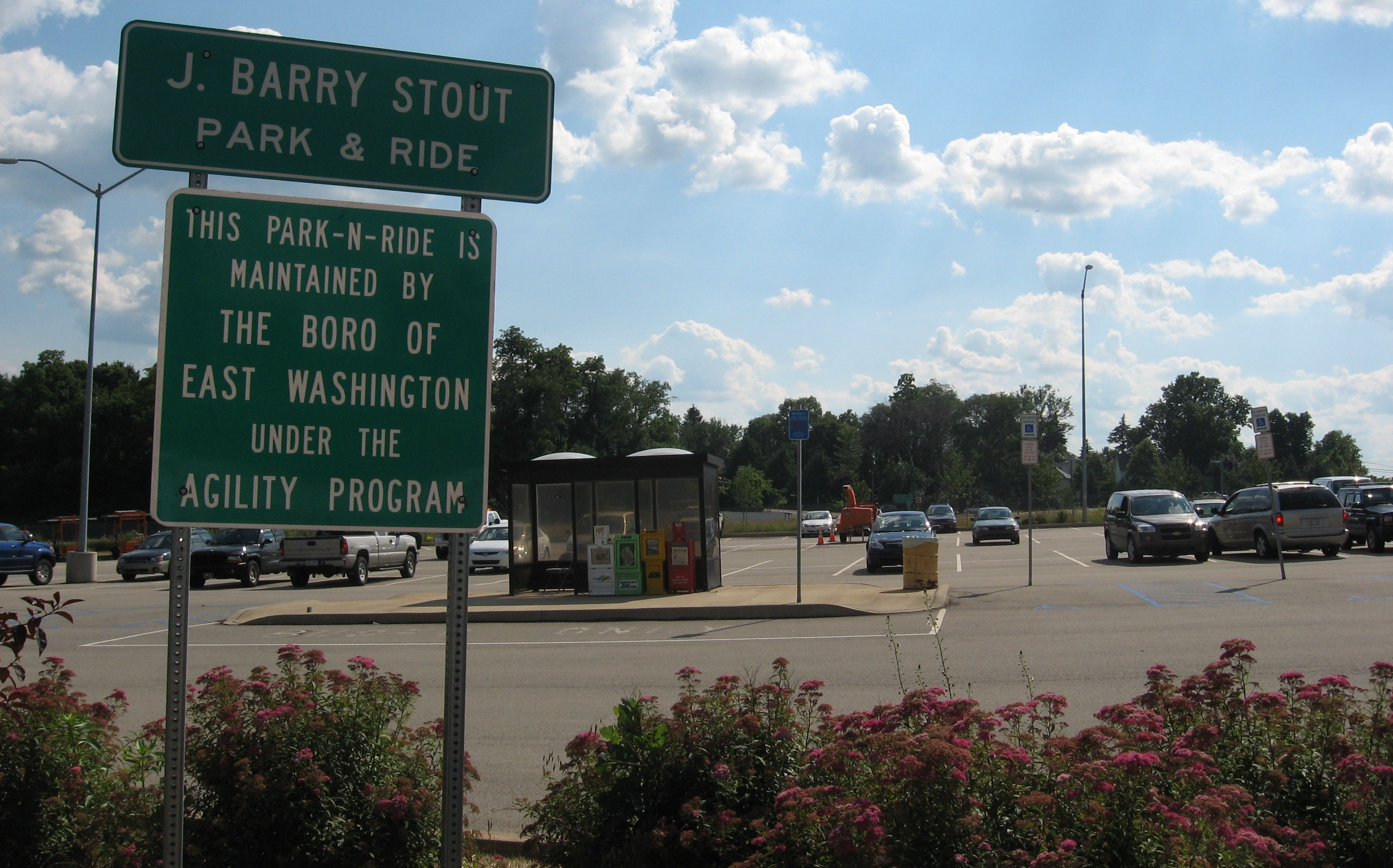
The J. Barry Stout Park and Ride in South Strabane Township.

On October 22, 2004 PennDOT dedicated the "J. Barry Stout Park and Ride" off the "Beau Street" exit of I-70 in South Strabane Township. Constructed by Greensburg-based Donegal Construction at a cost of $1.2 million, the lighted park and ride lot has 211 spaces and 7 handicapped-accessible spaces. Stout initially suggested the location of the park and ride lot after learning that PennDOT owned the land, which is ideally situated near I-70, I-79, and Route 19.

Stout has credited former Lieutenant Governor of Pennsylvania Ernie Kline with facilitating his election to the Pennsylvania State Senate in 1977.

== Death ==
Stout died at the age of seventy-nine on October 29, 2016.
