= Bridge Street Town Centre =

Lifestyle center in Huntsville, Alabama

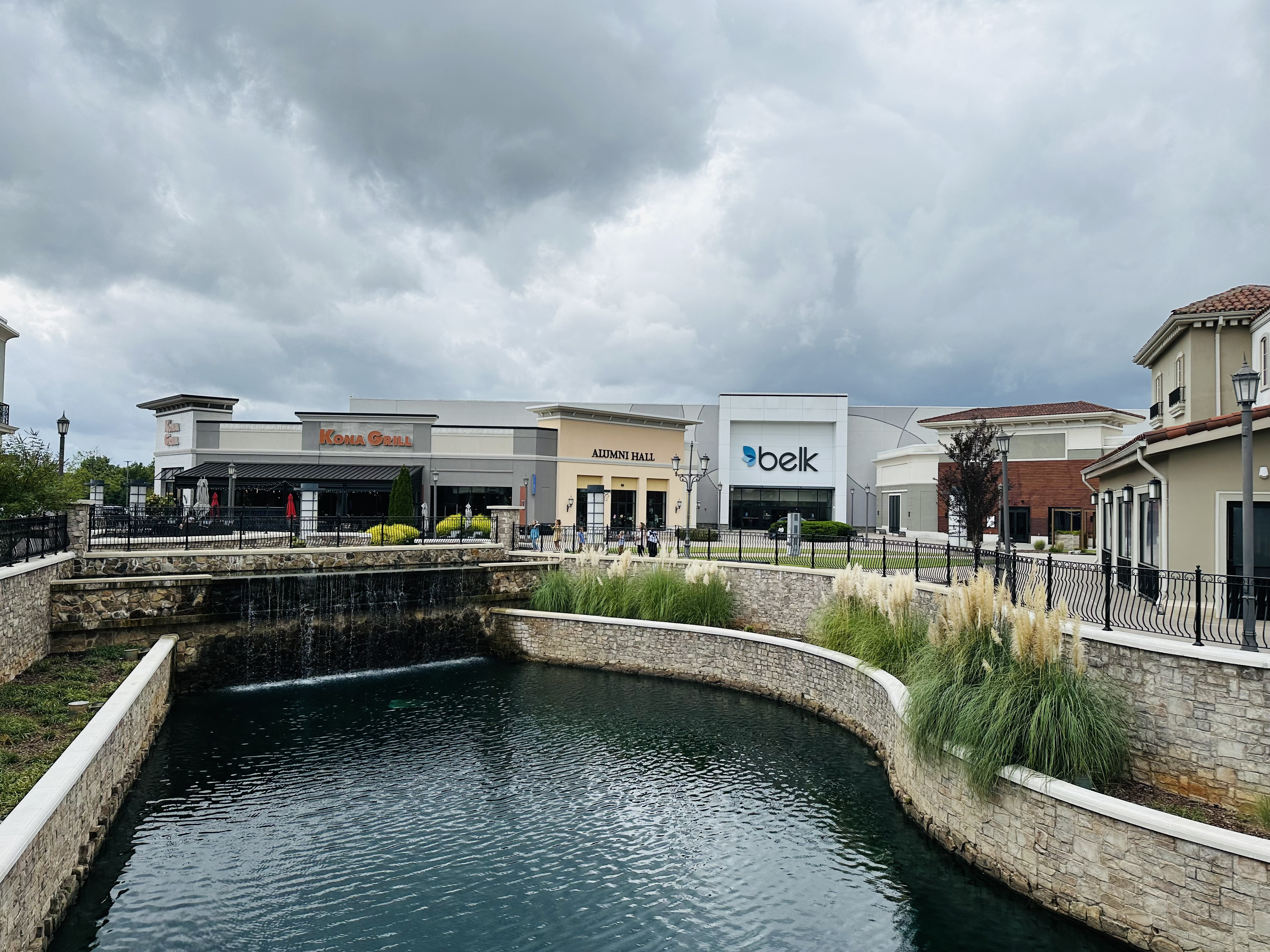
- Bridge Street Town Centre in 2025
- Location: Huntsville, Alabama, United States
- Coordinates: 34.717°N 86.674°W
- Address: 365 The Bridge St, Huntsville, AL 35806
- Opened: November 1, 2007
- Manager: Tanger Inc.
- Owner: Tanger Inc.
- Architect: TSArchitects
- Num. of stores: 70
- Num. of anchor tenants: 2
- Floor area: 825,000 sq ft (76,600 m^{2})
- Website: bridgestreethuntsville.com

Bridge Street Town Centre is a lifestyle center in Huntsville, Alabama, developed by O&S Holdings and designed by TSArchitects, both of Los Angeles. The center is located in Cummings Research Park at the intersection of Old Madison Pike, Interstate 565, and Research Park Boulevard (Alabama State Route 255).

Bridge Street includes 550,000 sq ft (51,000 m^{2}) of retail space featuring a Cinemark movie theater and 80 shops and restaurants as well as a one six-story, 140,000 sq ft (13,000 m^{2}) Class A office space building, and an eleven-story, 232 room Westin Hotel and a 150-room Element by Westin hotel. The center used to feature a 10-acre (40,000 m^{2}) lake, but need for a department store anchor pad and leakage problems caused most of it to be filled in. A 5 acre lake remains.

The retail portion of the mixed-use project opened on November 1, 2007. The Westin became the first in Alabama when it opened in Spring of 2008.

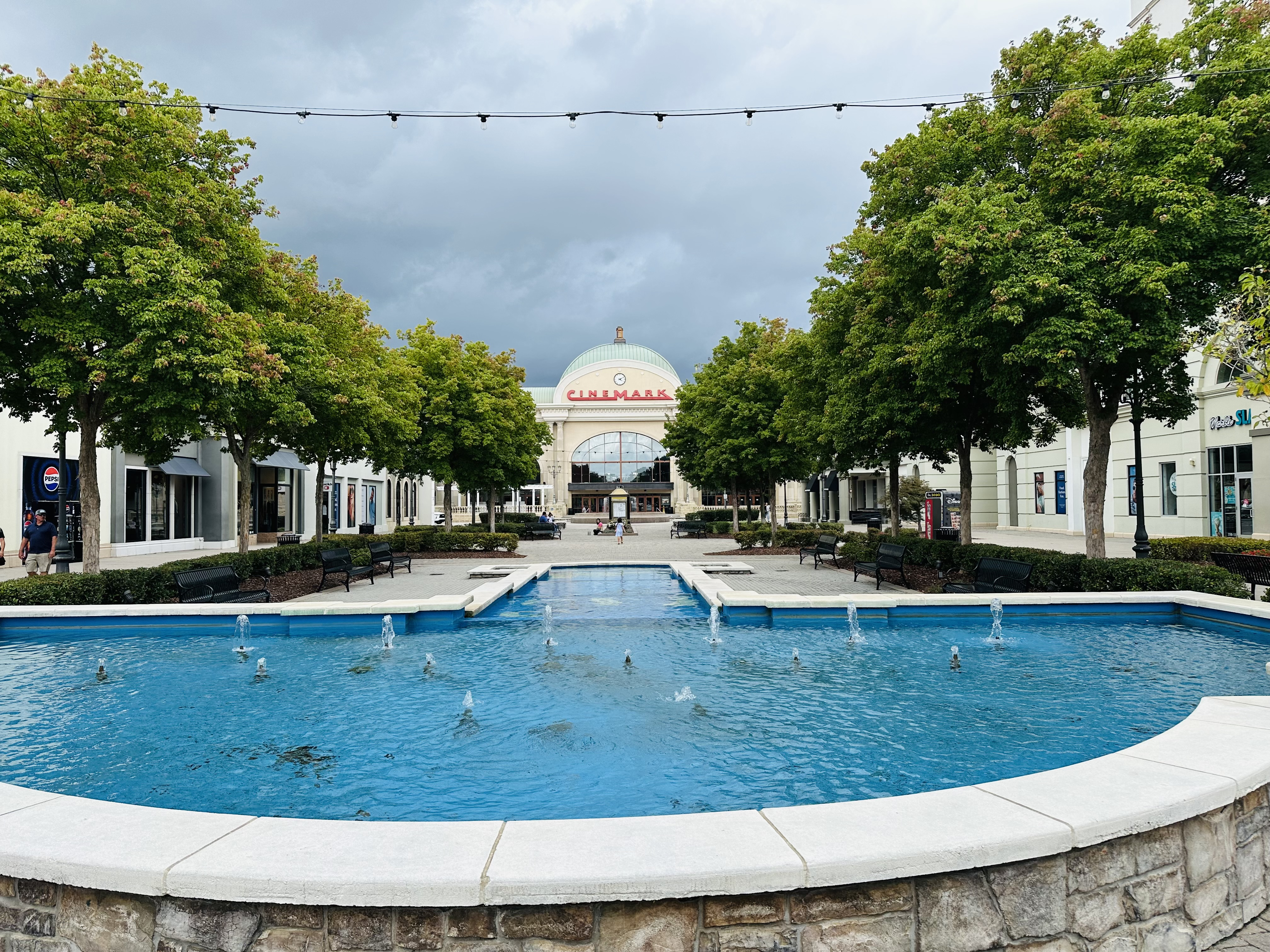

Bridge Street offers a wide variety of shops and restaurants. Among them are Altar'd State, Anthropologie, Apple, Barnes & Noble, Bath & Body Works, Belk, Connors Steak & Seafood, DSW Shoes, Francesca's, H&M, Mountain High Outfitters, P.F. Chang's, Sephora, Victoria's Secret and other boutique shops, as well as a Cinemark movie theater.

== Ownership change and expansion ==
In May 2012, Bridge Street was purchased from O&S Holdings by Miller Capital Advisory. In February 2013, Bayer Properties, L.L.C. was named as management and leasing company for the property. With news of the purchase, both the new owners and the city of Huntsville announced an expansion for the development. Phase 3, which began in January 2013, includes a two-level, 170,000 square foot flagship Belk department store, 45,000 square feet of new retail space in four additional buildings, and new surface and deck parking. This addition is being built where the western portion of the lake once was located. Like several of the stores in the development, Belk moved from an existing location in the city (Madison Square Mall). Belk opened at Bridge Street in Fall 2014. In December 2023, the shopping center was purchased by Tanger for $193 million.

== Sources ==
- About.com article on Bridge Street Town Centre
- Bridge Street Town Centre web page — O&S Holdings.com
- Huntsville Chamber of Commerce article on Bridge Street Town Centre
