= David W. Sweet =

American politician

Member of the Pennsylvania House of Representatives from the 48th district
- In office 1977–1988
- Preceded by: Barry Stout
- Succeeded by: Anthony L. Colaizzo

Personal details
- Born: October 8, 1948 (age 77) Pittsburgh, Pennsylvania
- Party: Democratic
- Education: University of Pennsylvania; University of Chicago

David W. Sweet (born October 8, 1948) is a retired attorney and former commissioner of the Pennsylvania Public Utility Commission. He also served as a member of the Pennsylvania House of Representatives from Washington, PA.

He earned a B.A. from the University of Pennsylvania in 1970, a M.A. from University of Chicago in 1971, and a J.D. from the Dickinson School of Law in 1981.

He was first elected to represent the 48th legislative district in the Pennsylvania House of Representatives in 1976. During his legislative career, he served as chair of the House Local Government Committee from 1987 to 1988, shepherding bills on local tax reform, distressed municipalities, and land use and zoning regulations to enactment.

Sweet was campaign manager for Ed Rendell during his 2002 gubernatorial election. He later served as executive director for the Rendell transition team. He declined an offer to become Rendell's chief of staff and returned to legal practice at Buchanan, Ingersoll & Rooney.

The Pennsylvania Report named him to the 2003 "The Pennsylvania Report Power 75" list of influential figures in Pennsylvania politics, crediting him with "much of Rendell’s western Pennsylvania success," In 2009, the Pennsylvania Report named him to "The Pennsylvania Report 100" list of influential figures in Pennsylvania politics, noting that he "continues to be a key insider among Democratic power circles" and that he remains "an informal advisor to Governor Rendell." In 2003, he was named to the PoliticsPA "Power 50" list of politically influential individuals in Pennsylvania.
