= LeMoyne Crematory =

First crematory in the United States

- U.S. National Register of Historic Places
- Pennsylvania state historical marker
- Washington County History & Landmarks Foundation Landmark
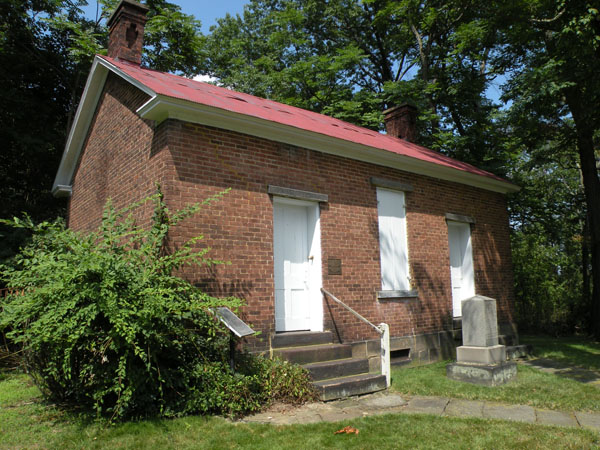

- Location within Pennsylvania Location within the United States
- Location: Jct. of Redstone Rd. and Elm St., NW corner, North Franklin Township, Washington, Pennsylvania
- Coordinates: 40°9′38″N 80°14′16″W
- Area: less than one acre
- Built: 1876
- Architect: Dye, John
- NRHP reference No.: 96000078

Significant dates
- Added to NRHP: February 16, 1996
- Designated PHMC: August 01, 1953

The LeMoyne Crematory was the first crematory in the United States. Francis Julius LeMoyne had it built in 1876 on his own land, perched atop a location known locally as Gallow's Hill in North Franklin Township near Washington, Pennsylvania. The first cremation took place on December 6, 1876. LeMoyne believed that cremation was a more sanitary way to dispose of bodies, preventing the contamination of drinking water. After 41 more cremations there (with LeMoyne being the third, in 1879), the crematory was closed in 1901. LeMoyne's remains are buried there.

It is a brick 20 x 30 one-story building.

== Timeline ==
Dr. Francis LeMoyne believed that cremation was a more sanitary way to dispose of bodies, preventing the contamination of drinking water. The structure was built in 1876, with the first cremation took place on December 6, 1876. Baron Joseph Henry Louis Charles De Palm, an impoverished Bavarian noble, was the first person to be cremated here (roughly 6 months after he died and consistent with his wishes).

After 41 more cremations there (with Dr. LeMoyne being the third, in 1879), the crematory was closed in 1901. The final cremation had occurred the year prior, on November 28, 1900, after Mrs. Mary S. Booth's remains were disposed of in the retort.

== The crematory in recent history ==
In 1953, the Pennsylvania Historical and Museum Commission installed a historical marker noting the historic importance of the crematory. It was added to the National Register of Historic Places on February 16, 1996. It is designated as a historic public landmark by the Washington County History & Landmarks Foundation.

Today, the structure can be found in the same location off of South Main Street. The Washington County Historical Society occasionally offers limited tours.
