= Tim Solobay =

American politician

Pennsylvania Fire Commissioner
- In office January 20, 2015 – December 2017
- Governor: Tom Wolf
- Preceded by: Ed Mann

Member of the Pennsylvania Senate from the 46th district
- In office January 4, 2011 – January 6, 2015
- Preceded by: Barry Stout
- Succeeded by: Camera Bartolotta

Member of the Pennsylvania House of Representatives from the 48th district
- In office January 5, 1999 – November 30, 2010
- Preceded by: Anthony Colaizzo
- Succeeded by: Brandon Neuman

Personal details
- Born: March 20, 1956 (age 70) Canonsburg, Pennsylvania, U.S.
- Party: Democratic
- Education: California University of Pennsylvania; California Coast University

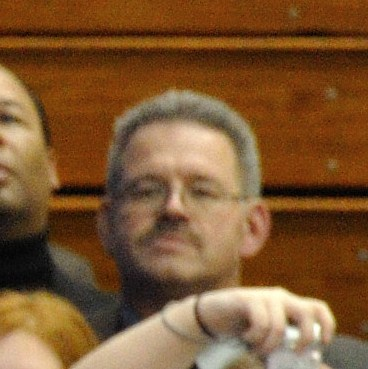
Pennsylvania Senator Tim Solobay at a 2008 Barack Obama rally

Timothy J. Solobay (born March 20, 1956) is a Pennsylvania politician who served as the Fire Commissioner of Pennsylvania from 2015 to 2017. A Democrat, he previously served as a member of the Pennsylvania State Senate.

== Formative years ==
Born in Canonsburg, Pennsylvania on March 20, 1956, Solobay graduated from the Washington Hospital School of Radiologic Technology (Washington, Pennsylvania) in 1976. He received a B.S. in Radiologic Technology from California University of Pennsylvania in 1984 and a B.S. in Business Management from an online program through the California Coast University in 1990. (California Coast University was not nationally accredited at the time he was taking online classes there; however, it was accredited by the State of California, and gained national distance learning accreditation in 2005.)

== Public service career ==
Solobay is the chief of the Canonsburg Volunteer Fire Department, and he was formerly a member of the Pennsylvania House of Representatives before his election to the Pennsylvania Senate. He was defeated for re-election to the state senate in 2014 by Republican Camera Bartolotta. He was then named the new State Fire Commissioner by Governor Tom Wolf. He resigned as Pennsylvania Fire Commissioner in late December 2017. Bruce Trego has been appointed as acting commissioner by Gov. Tom Wolf.
