= Brandon Neuman =

American politician

Brandon P. Neuman
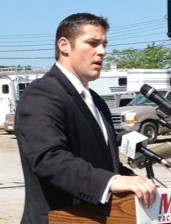

Judge of the Superior Court of Pennsylvania
- Incumbent
- Assumed office January 5, 2026
- Preceded by: Dan McCaffery

Member of the Pennsylvania House of Representatives from the 48th district
- In office January 4, 2011 – December 31, 2017
- Preceded by: Tim Solobay
- Succeeded by: Tim O'Neal

Personal details
- Born: November 1, 1981 (age 44) Eighty Four, Pennsylvania, U.S.
- Party: Democratic
- Spouse: Carrie Neuman
- Education: University of Richmond (B.A.); University of Pittsburgh School of Law (M.S.L.); Duquesne University School of Law (J.D.)

Brandon P. Neuman (born November 1, 1981) is an American politician and jurist. He is a judge of the Superior Court of Pennsylvania. A member of the Democratic Party, he previously represented the 48th district in the Pennsylvania House of Representatives from 2011 to 2017. He was also a court of common pleas judge in Washington County.

== Personal life and education ==
Neuman graduated from Canon–McMillan High School in 2000. He earned a bachelor's in criminal justice from the University of Richmond in 2005. Neuman earned a master's degree from the University of Pittsburgh in 2005 and a J.D. from Duquesne University in 2009. Neuman played football for Canon–McMillan and the University of Richmond.

== Career ==
Neuman was first elected to the Pennsylvania House in 2011. He represented Washington County, Pennsylvania, which is to the South of Pittsburgh. Neuman served on the Agriculture & Rural Affairs, Consumer Affairs, Judiciary, Labor & Industry, and Rules committees.

Neuman had been a critic of former Governor Tom Corbett's handling of the Penn State child sex abuse scandal. Along with fellow Representative Tony DeLuca, Neuman had introduced legislation to combat healthcare waste and fraud.

Neuman ran for Lieutenant Governor of Pennsylvania in 2014, but finished fifth in the Democratic primary.

Neuman resigned his state house seat in December 2017, after he was elected as a Washington County judge.

In 2025, Neuman was elected as a judge to the Superior Court of Pennsylvania, filling a seat which had been left vacant by the ascendance of Daniel McCaffery to the Supreme Court of Pennsylvania. He is the first Millennial to be elected to a seat on one of Pennsylvania's appellate courts.

On January 7, 2026, Judge Neuman was sworn in by Pennsylvania Supreme Court Chief Justice Debra Todd. "People will always come first, and the outcome should always be justice for the people," Neuman said in a speech that followed his swearing in. "Every case has a person behind it."
