= Anthony Colaizzo =

American politician (1930–2019)

Anthony L. Colaizzo

Member of the Pennsylvania House of Representatives from the 48th district
- In office 1989–1998
- Preceded by: David W. Sweet
- Succeeded by: Tim Solobay

Personal details
- Born: May 31, 1930 Canonsburg, Pennsylvania, U.S.
- Died: January 12, 2019 (aged 88) Canonsburg, Pennsylvania, U.S.
- Party: Democratic
- Education: Duquesne University
- Occupation: Businessman

Anthony L. Colaizzo (May 31, 1930 – January 12, 2019) was a Democratic member of the Pennsylvania House of Representatives, where he served for ten years from 1989 until 1999. He was the mayor of Canonsburg, Pennsylvania for ten years until 2009 when David Rhome was elected to replace him.

== Background ==
Colaizzo was born in Canonsburg, Pennsylvania. He received his bachelor's degree in businessman administration, in 1956, from Duquesne University. He was involved in the real estate, tax preparation, and insurance businesses.
