= Tanger Inc. =

American real estate investment trust

- Type: Public company
- Traded as: NYSE: SKT; S&P 600 component
- Industry: Real estate investment trust
- Founded: 1981; 45 years ago
- Founder: Stanley Tanger
- Headquarters: Greensboro, North Carolina
- Key people: Steven B. Tanger - Chairman - Stephen Yalof - Chief Executive Officer
- Products: Shopping centers
- Revenue: ▲$442.6 million (2022)
- Net income: ▲$201.8 million (2022)
- Total assets: ▲$2.381 billion (2024)
- Total equity: ▲$679.7 million (2024)
- Number of employees: 400+ (2026)
- Website: tanger.com

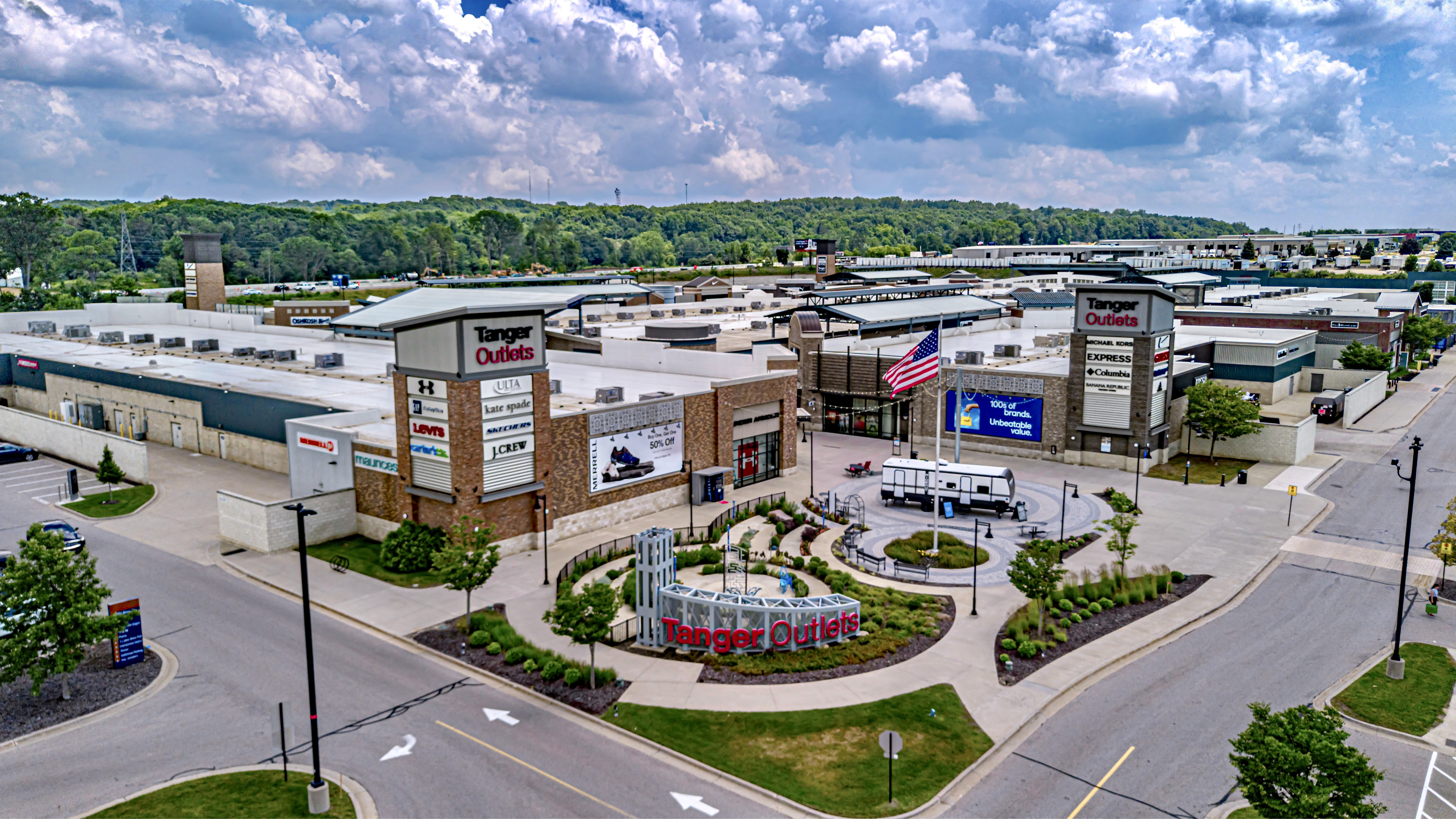
Tanger Outlets - Byron Center, Michigan

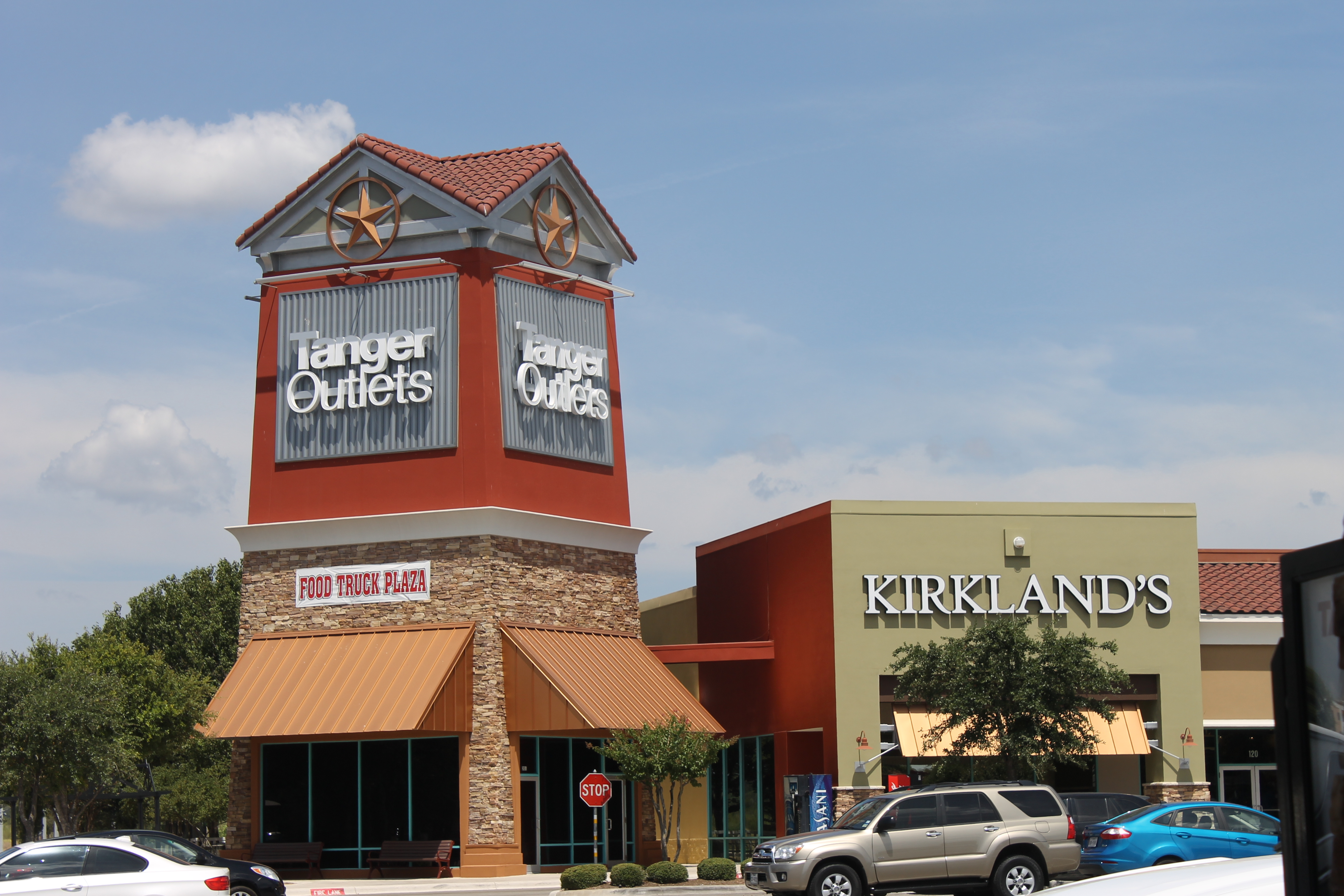
Tanger Outlets tower in San Marcos, Texas

Tanger Inc. is a real estate investment trust headquartered in Greensboro, North Carolina, that invests in open air outlet and lifestyle shopping centers in the United States and Canada.

As of June 30, 2026, the company owns and or manages 38 outlet centers, and 4 open-air lifestyle centers across the US and Canada comprising over 17 million square feet and more than 3,000 stores operated by more than 800 different brand name companies.

Some of the company's largest tenants include Gap, Knitwell Group, Tapestry Inc., Nike, Inc., PVH, Under Armour, American Eagle Outfitters, H&M, and Ralph Lauren Corporation.

Notable properties owned by the company include Tanger Outlets The Walk, Tanger Outlets Nashville, and Tanger Outlets Pittsburgh.

== History ==
In 1981, Stanley Tanger opened the Burlington Manufacturer's Outlet Center in Burlington, North Carolina.

In May 1993, the company was incorporated as a real estate investment trust and became a public company via an initial public offering.

In September 2002, Tanger purchased Kensington Valley Factory Shops in Howell, Michigan.

In January 2009, Steven B. Tanger, the son of the founder and the namesake of the Steven Tanger Center for the Performing Arts, became president and CEO of the company. That same year, in September, founder Stanley K. Tanger resigned from the position of chairman.

In October 2010, the founder died at age 87.

In January 2011, the company announced a 50/50 joint venture with RioCan Real Estate Investment Trust to develop outlet malls in Canada. In June 2011, the company formed a joint venture with Simon Property Group to develop a shopping center south of Houston, Texas.

In October 2015, the company sold 5 shopping centers for $150.7 million. In April 2019, the company sold 4 shopping centers to Singerman Real Estate and The Outlet Resource Group for $130.5 million.

Beginning in 2020, Tanger commenced a management succession plan and full refreshment of its executive management team with the appointment of Stephen Yalof as president and eventual CEO. As of March 2025, the company's management team also included Michael Bilerman as Executive Vice President, Chief Financial Officer and Chief Investment Officer; Leslie Swanson as Executive Vice President, Chief Operating Officer; Jessica Norman as Executive Vice President, General Counsel and Secretary; Justin Stein as Executive Vice President, Leasing; and Thomas Guerrieri Jr. as Senior Vice President, Chief Accounting Officer.

In October 2023, the company opened its newest outlet center in Nashville, Tennessee.

In November 2023, Tanger announced its purchase of Asheville Outlets in Asheville, North Carolina.

In December 2023, Tanger purchased Bridge Street Town Centre in Huntsville, Alabama. The company has since purchased two additional open air lifestyle centers, including The Promenade at Chenal in Little Rock, AR, in December 2024, and Pinecrest in Cleveland, OH, in February 2025.

In April 2025, Tanger sold its outlet in Howell, Michigan, to Lormax Stern for an undisclosed price.
