= Tanger Family Bicentennial Garden =

Historical garden and visitor center in Greensboro, North Carolina

Coordinates: 36.0929°N 79.8416°W

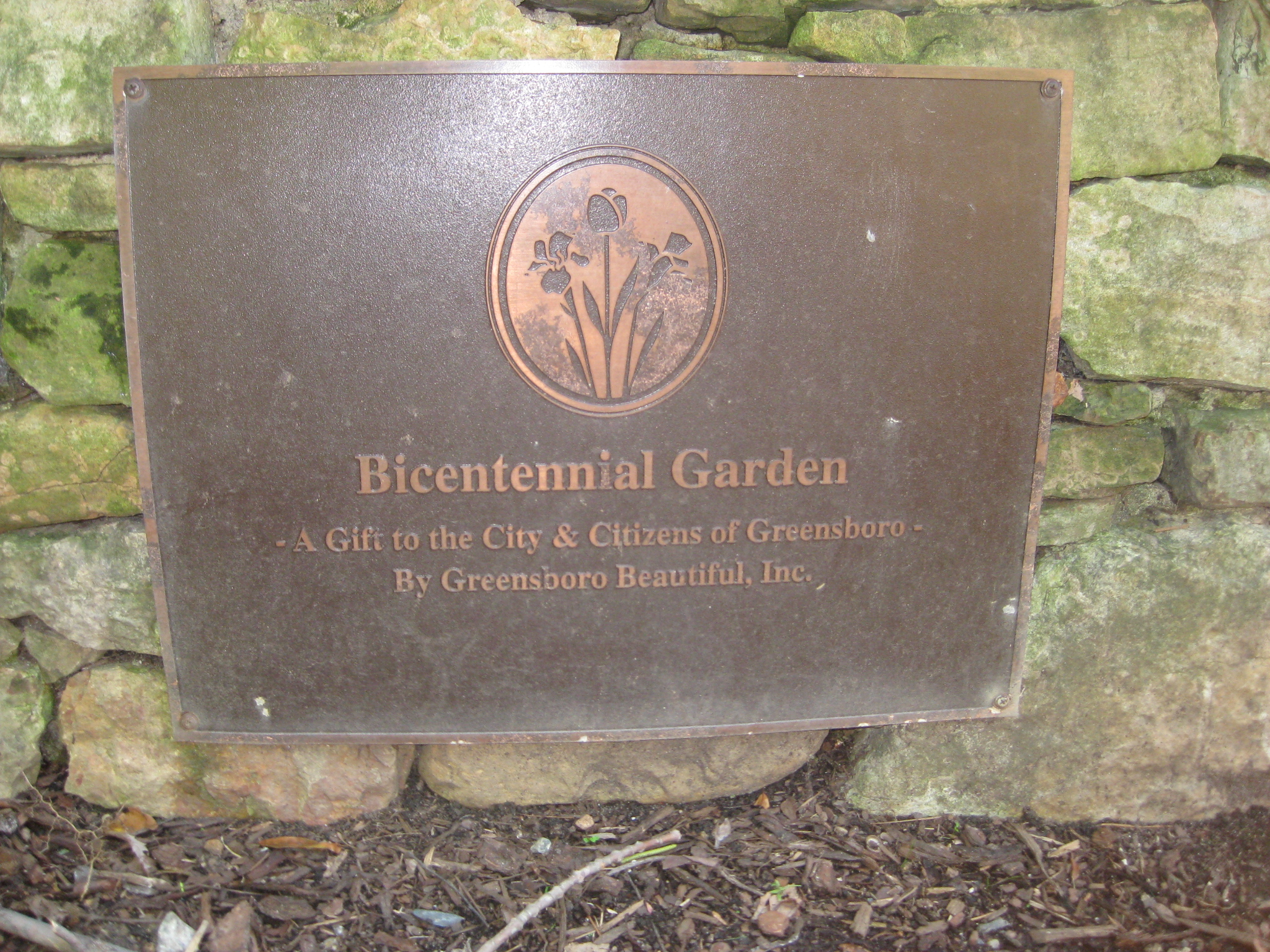
- Bicentennial Garden Plaque
- Interactive map of Tanger Family Bicentennial Garden
- Location: Greensboro, North Carolina
- Opened: 1976
- Operator: Greensboro Parks and Recreation
- Website: http://www.greensborobeautiful.org/gardens/bicentennial_garden.php

The Tanger Family Bicentennial Garden is a historical garden and visitor center located in Greensboro, North Carolina. It was created in 1976 to recognize and honor the 200th anniversary of the United States (its bicentennial). The garden features a man-made circulating stream, a wedding gazebo, and a variety of artistic and historical sculptures. Throughout, many different plants and shrubs decorate the landscape including annuals, perennials, flowering trees, and canopy trees. Greensboro Beautiful is a non-profit organization that raises funds for the garden, while the Greensboro Parks and Recreation Department oversees the events offered.

== Events ==
The gazebo on garden grounds is a popular site for weddings and other events. Located in the center of the Tanger Family Bicentennial Garden, the gazebo can accommodate up to 100 people.

On August 17, 2010, roughly $8,000 worth of copper roofing was stolen from the gazebo and kiosk. The theft was discovered the following morning at 7:30 by garden staff.

== Gallery ==
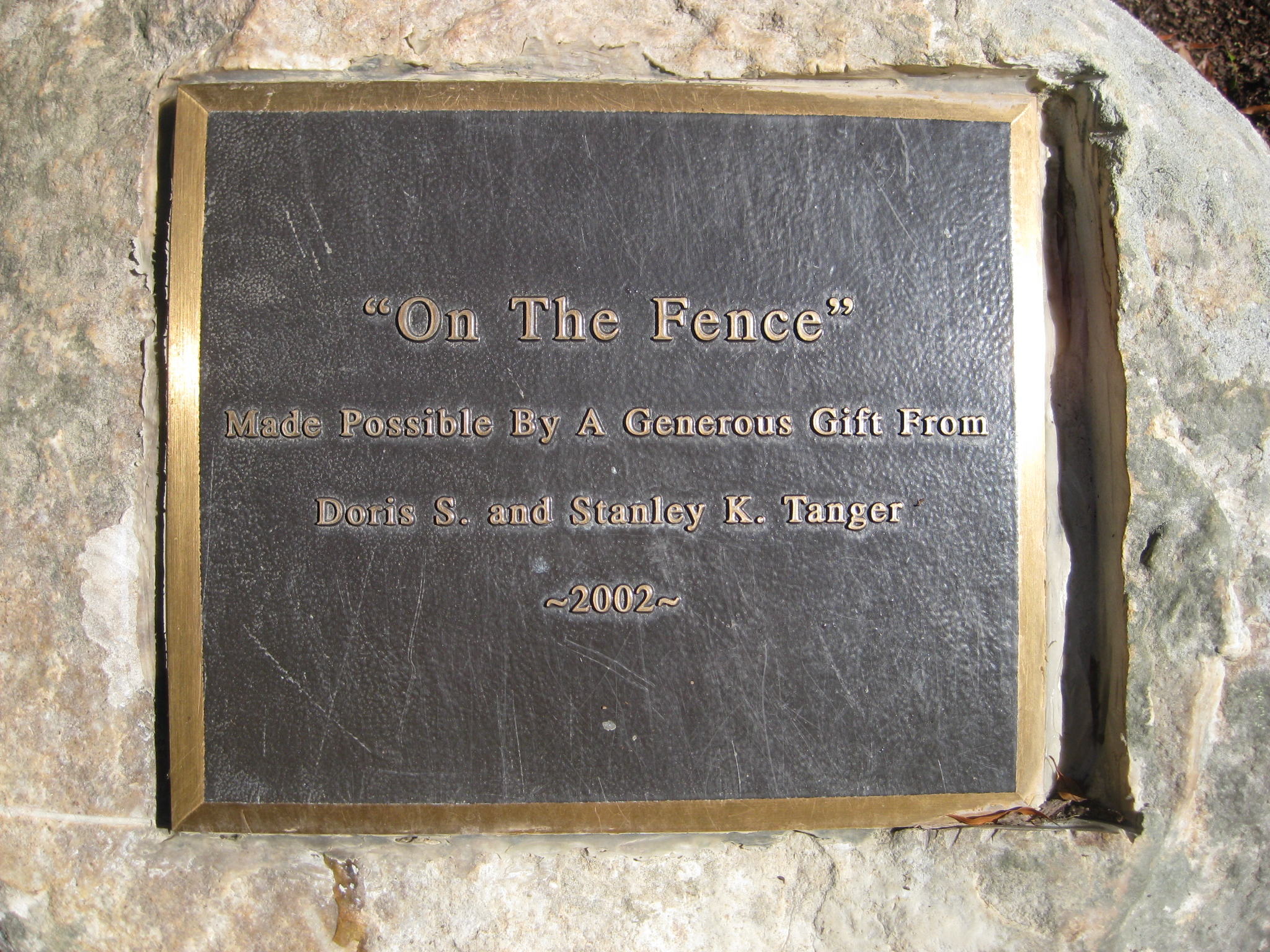
"On the Fence" plaque

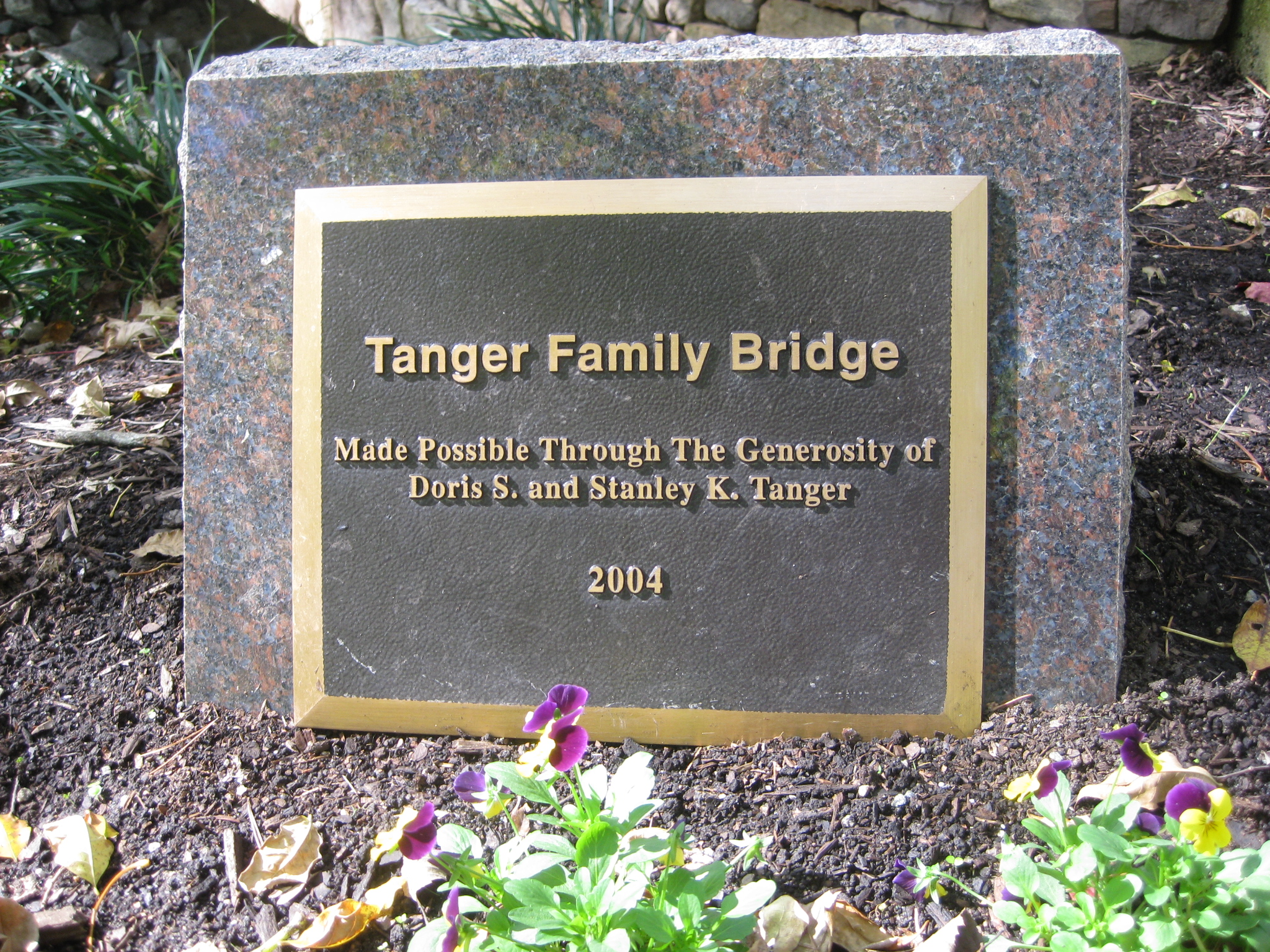
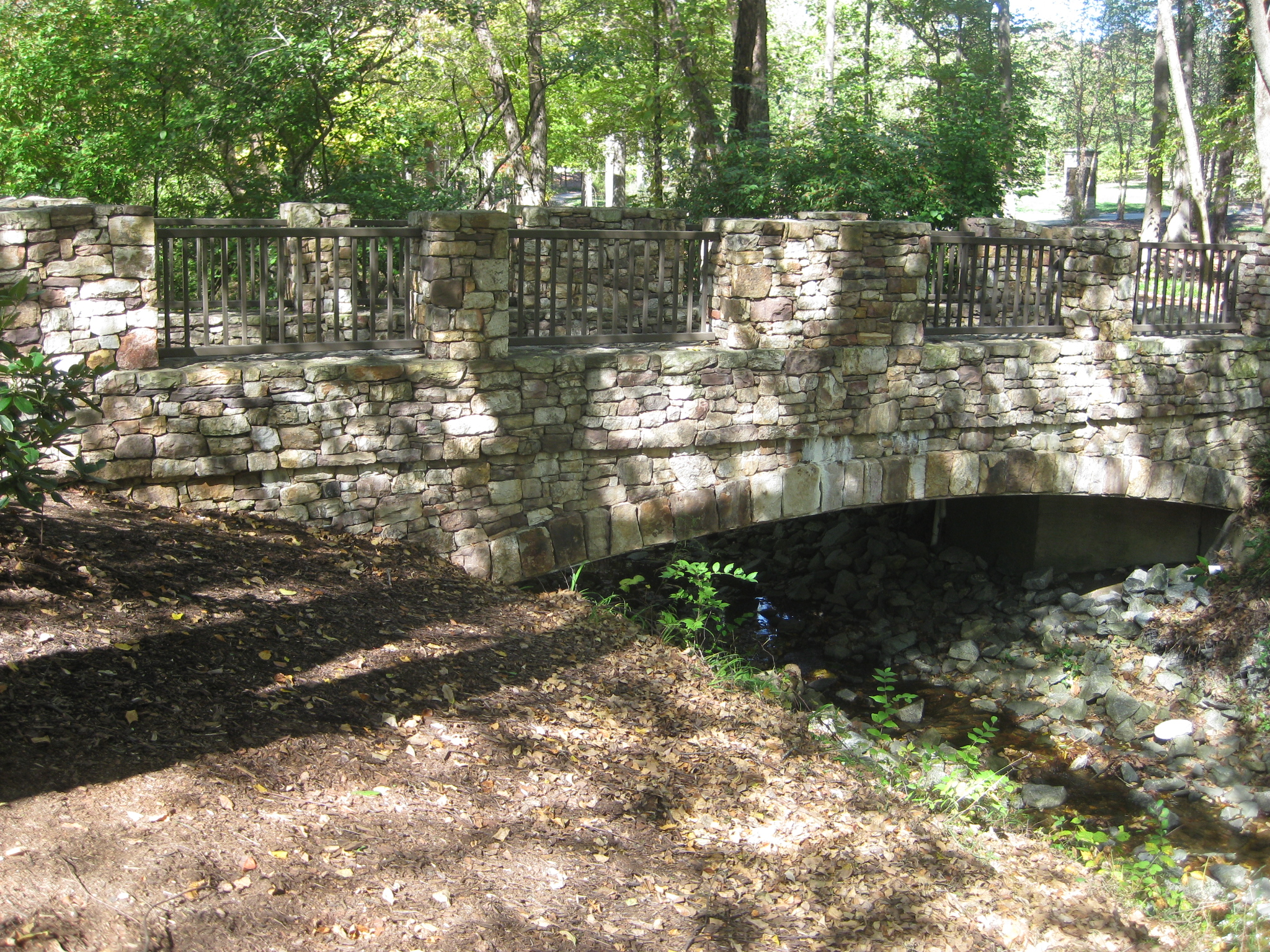
The Tanger family bridge plaque and bridge

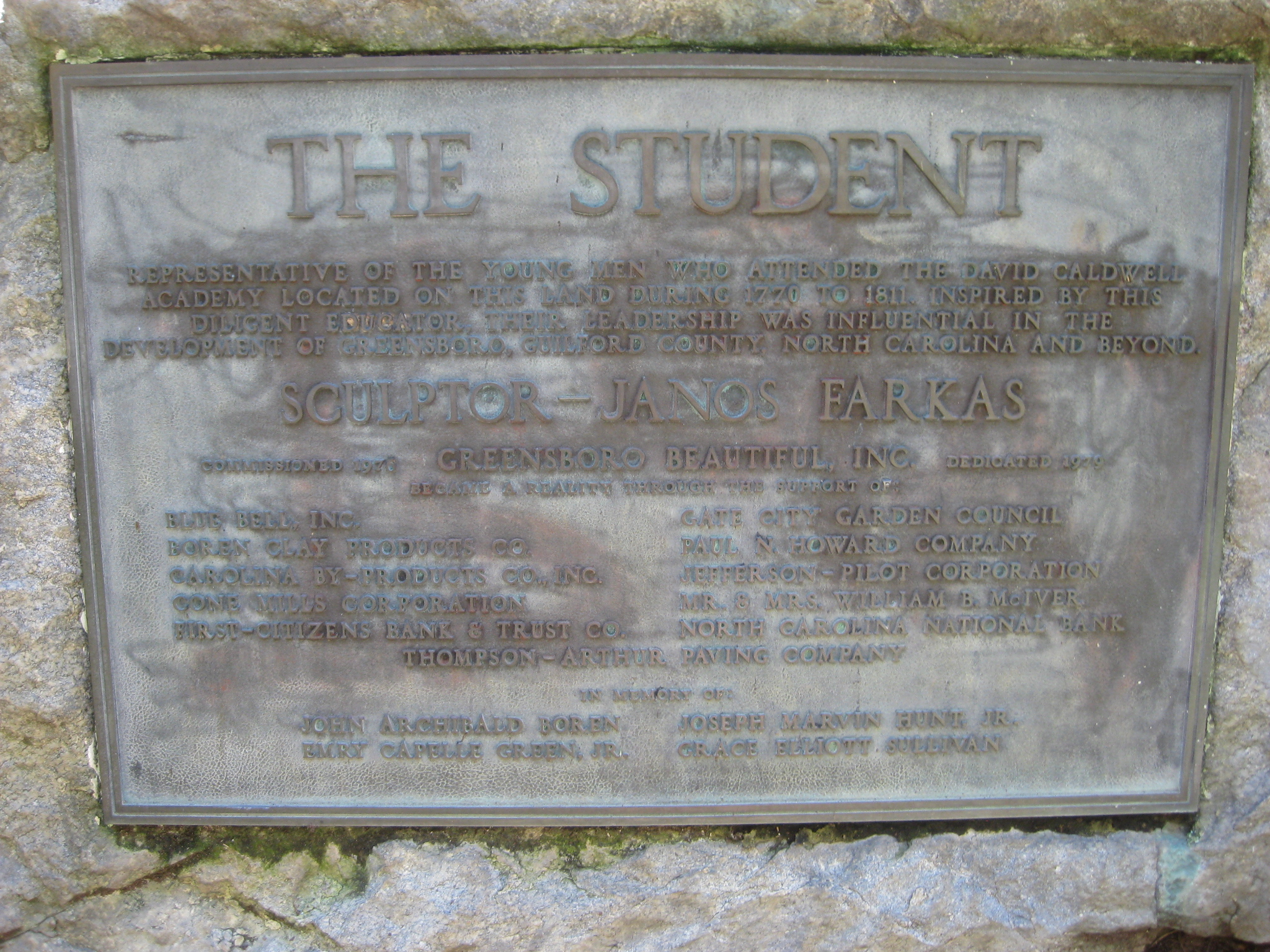
"The Student" plaque

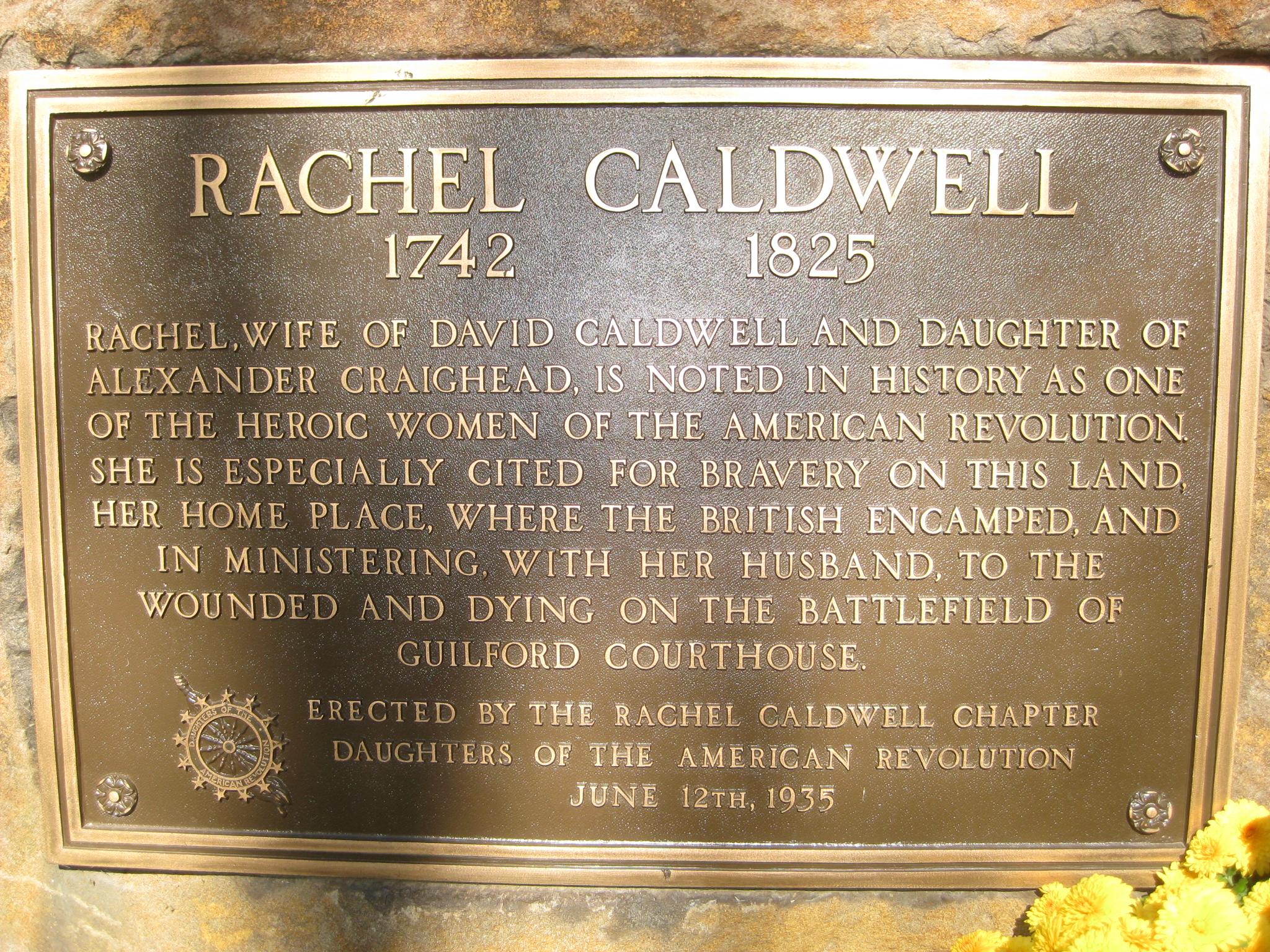
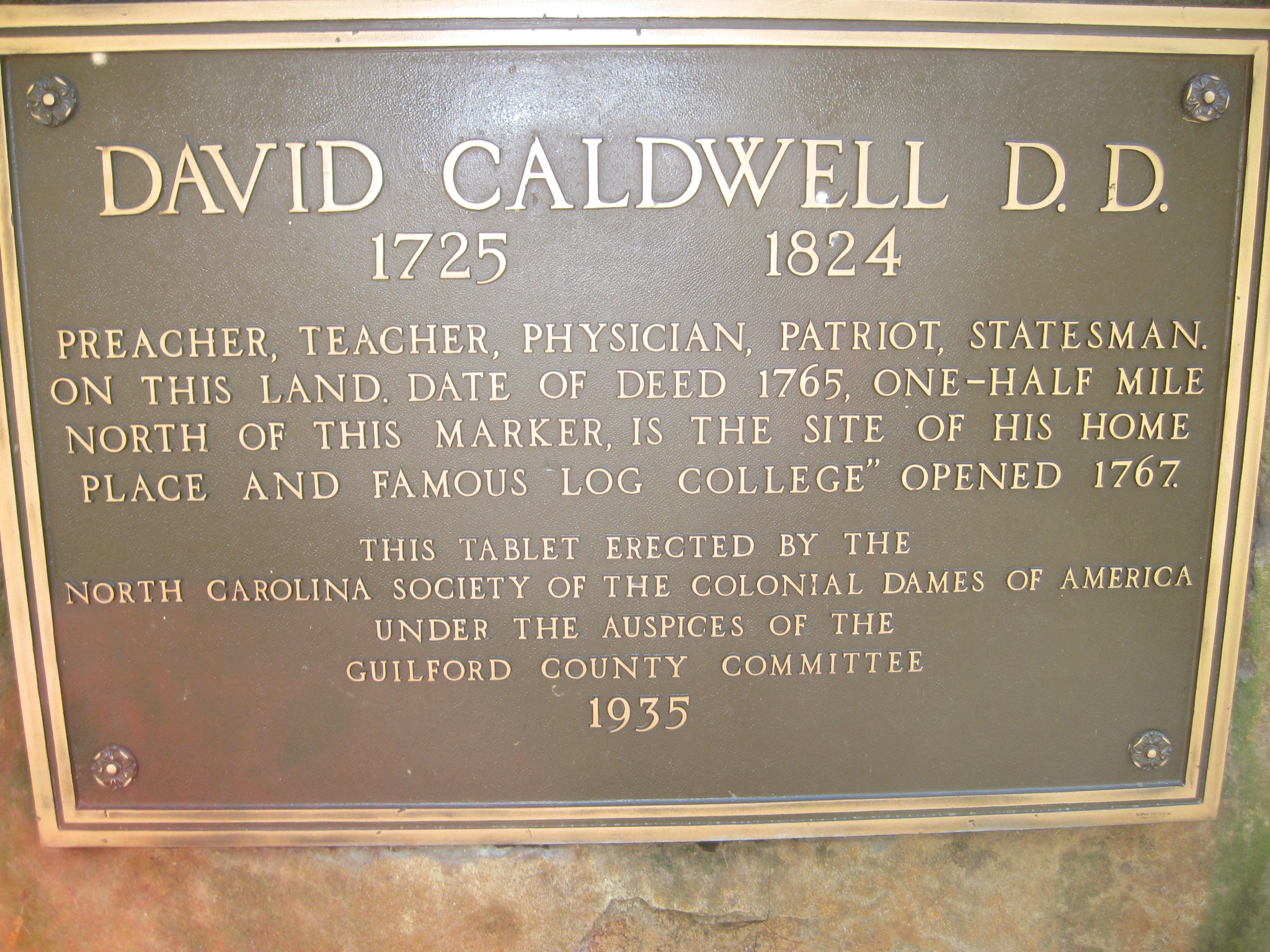
Rachel Caldwell and David Caldwell (for whom the Caldwell Academy was named) plaques, the two are located adjacent to each other in the garden

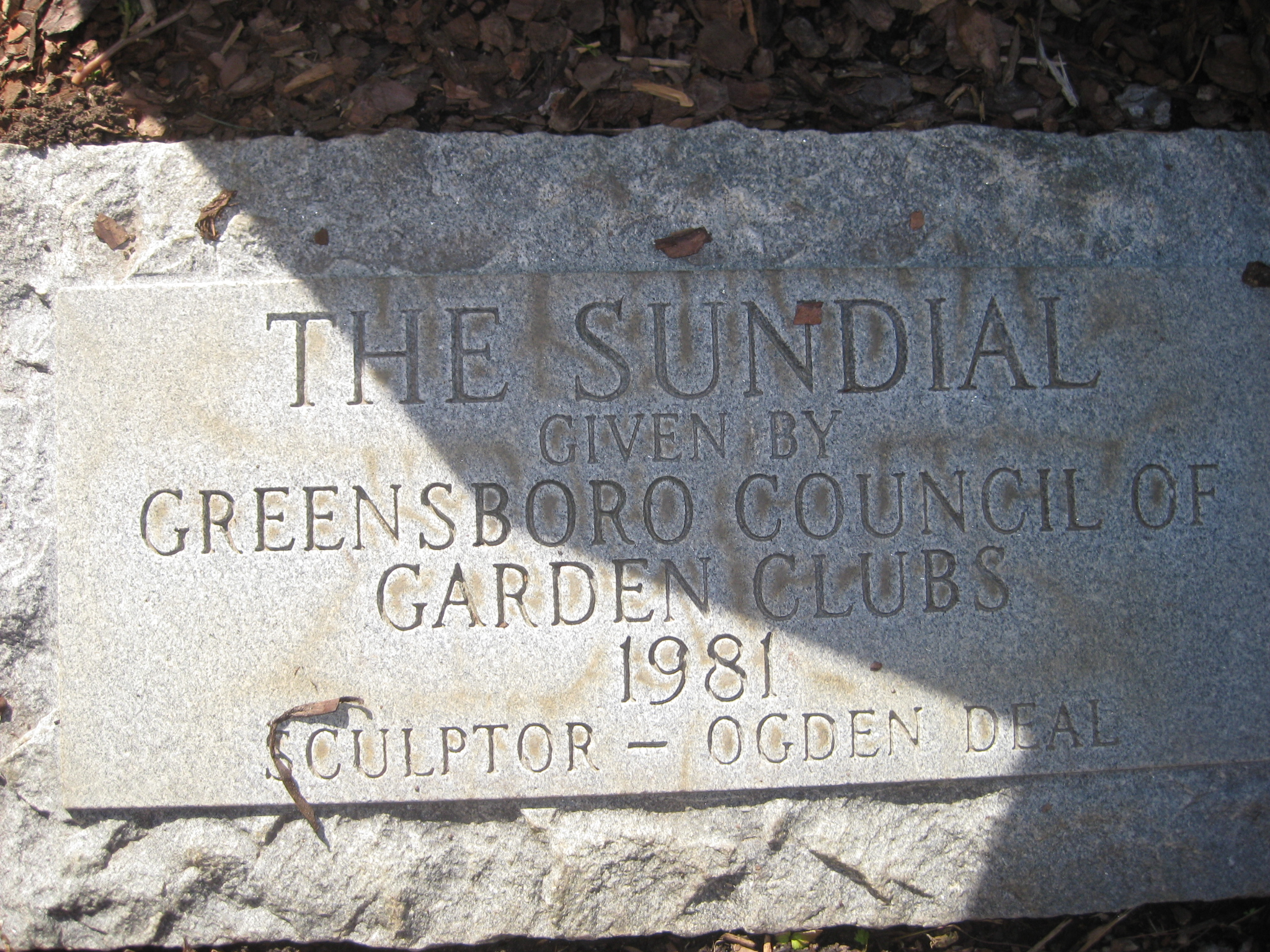
Sundial plaque

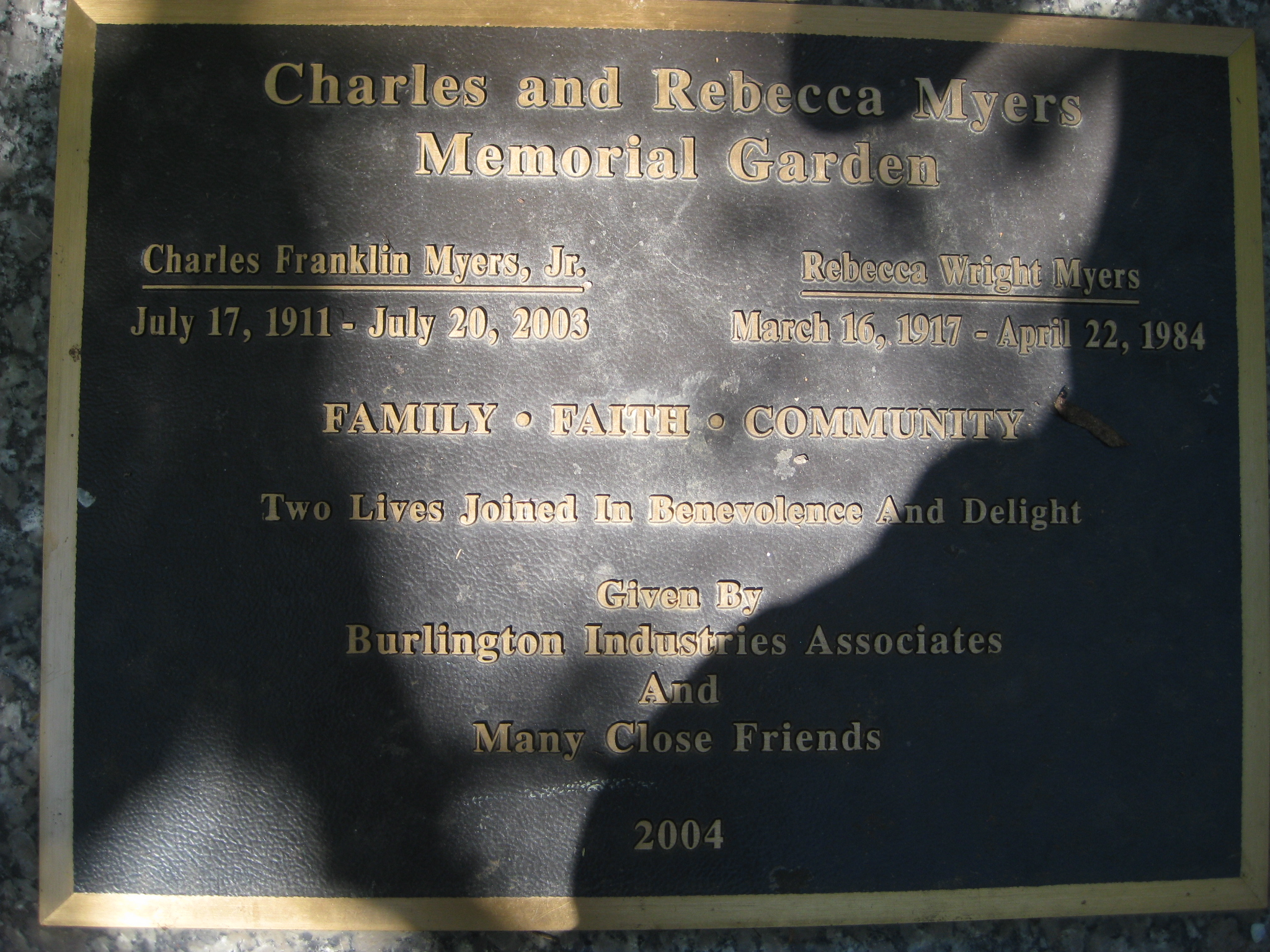
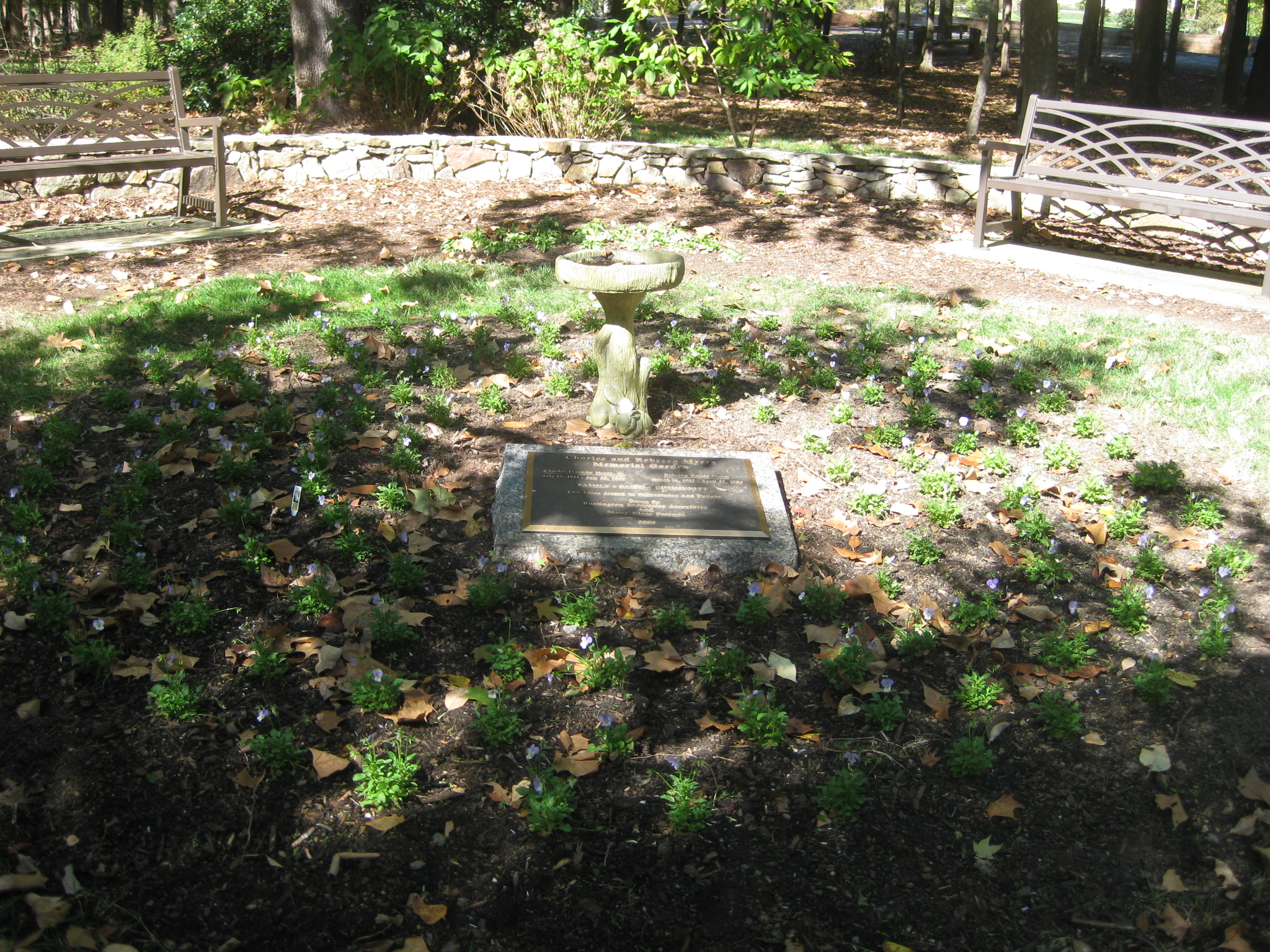
Charles and Rebecca Myers Memorial Garden plaque and garden
