= Freedom Transit (Washington County, Pennsylvania) =

Washington County transportation authority

Freedom Transit Washington County Transportation Authority

Overview
- Locale: Washington County, Pennsylvania
- Headquarters: 50 E. Chestnut Street; Washington, PA 15301
- Website: https://www.freedom-transit.org

Operation
- Began operation: 2001
- Reporting marks: Freedom Transit

Washington County Transportation Authority, operating as Freedom Transit, is the official transportation authority in Washington County, Pennsylvania. It was created in 2001 to take over the "human service transportation programs previously overseen by the County’s Department of Human Services and managed by a private broker." The mission of Freedom Transit is to connect people who live, work, learn, and play in Washington County and surrounding areas by providing high-quality, accessible public transportation services.

In 2015, Washington City Transit merged into the Washington County Transportation Authority and also became an operator of fixed-route bus service. The agency operates in the central portion of the county, which includes the county seat of Washington and a growing suburban area. The industrial Monongahela Valley portion of the county continues to be served by the Mid Mon Valley Transit Authority For commuter service, Freedom Transit offers two suburban park and ride lots: along Interstate 79 in South Strabane Township, Pennsylvania and at the Southpointe development in Cecil Township.

== Route List ==
- Local A- Washington, Residential Areas, High School, Hospital, Park & Pool, Courthouse, and Senior Center (Monday-Friday)
- Local B- Washington, Education Centers, Shopping Plazas, Strabane Square, Crown Center, and Trinity Point (Monday-Friday)
- Local Saturday- Washington, Residential Areas, Education Centers, Shopping Plazas, Hospital, and Library & Park (Saturday)
- County Line A- Washington, Meadowlands, Houston, Canonsburg, Muse, and McDonald (Monday-Friday)
- County Line B- Washington, Houston, Canonsburg, McMurray, Finleyville, and Monongahela (Monday-Friday)
- Metro Commuter Weekday- Washington, Houston, Canonsburg, and Southpointe to Downtown Pittsburgh (Monday-Friday)
- Metro Commuter Saturday- Washington, Racetrack Road, Houston, Canonsburg, Route 19, McMurray, and South Hills (Saturday)
