= Stanley Tanger =

American businessman

Stanley K. Tanger (April 13, 1923 – October 23, 2010) was an American businessman and philanthropist. A pioneer of the outlet shopping industry, Tanger founded Tanger Factory Outlet Centers, which began with a single location in Burlington, North Carolina in 1981. According to the News & Record, Tanger invented "the very concept of the outlet mall".

== Biography ==
Tanger was the son of Harriette and Moe Tanger from Wallingford, Connecticut. Tanger served as a pilot during World War II. After World War II, Tanger began to run Creighton Shirtmakers, the family business in Reidsville, North Carolina. Under Tanger, Creighton Shirtmakers expanded to five outlet stores. In early 1981, Tanger organized other similar businesses and manufacturer outlets into a small, brand name outlet strip mall in Burlington, North Carolina.

The company, now known as Tanger Factory Outlet Centers, had since expanded to more than forty-one outlet centers in twenty-five U.S. states and four locations in Canada, as of April 2015. In 1993, Tanger Factory Outlet Centers became the first outlet developer to be publicly traded on the New York Stock Exchange.

Real Estate by Inc. Magazine named Tanger as "Entrepreneur of the Year" in 1994. In 2006, the Wall Street Journal listed Tanger Outlet Centers as one of the top ten REIT’s.

Tanger remained chairman of Tanger's board of directors until his retirement on August 7, 2009. He resigned as chairman of the board in September 2009, but remained a member of Tanger's board of directors until his death in 2010.

Tanger and his wife, Doris Tanger, a breast cancer survivor, were local, North Carolina philanthropists. Much of Tanger's philanthropy focused on breast cancer awareness, including a $1 million contribution to Moses Cone Health System's Regional Cancer Center in Greensboro. Tanger also funded a variety of beautification projects throughout the city of Greensboro, including the creation and preservation of city parks, including the Bicentennial Gardens.

Tanger died of pneumonia on October 23, 2010, aged 87. He was survived by his wife of sixty-three years as well as his children and grandchildren. Tanger's funeral was held at Temple Emanuel, a Reform Judaism congregation in Greensboro. His son, Steven, was named president and CEO of Tanger Factory Outlet Centers in January 2010.
