= Redevelopment Authority of the County of Washington =

Agency overview
- Formed: 1956
- Type: Redevelopment authority
- Jurisdiction: Washington County, Pennsylvania
- Headquarters: 100 West Beau St. Suite 603 Washington, Pennsylvania

The Redevelopment Authority of the County of Washington, also known as the Washington County Redevelopment Authority, is the redevelopment authority for Washington County, Pennsylvania. It is charged with redeveloping blighted areas and administering the county's Community Development Block Grant. It was created in 1956. Its operation is governed by the Pennsylvania Housing and Assistance Law of 1949 as well as the Urban Redevelopment Law of 1956.

The redevelopment authority managed the creation of Southpointe. It played a role in the redevelopment of the Washington Trust Building.
