= South Strabane Township, Pennsylvania =

Township in Pennsylvania, US

Coordinates: 40°11′19″N 80°14′02″W

South Strabane Township, Washington County, Pennsylvania
- Township
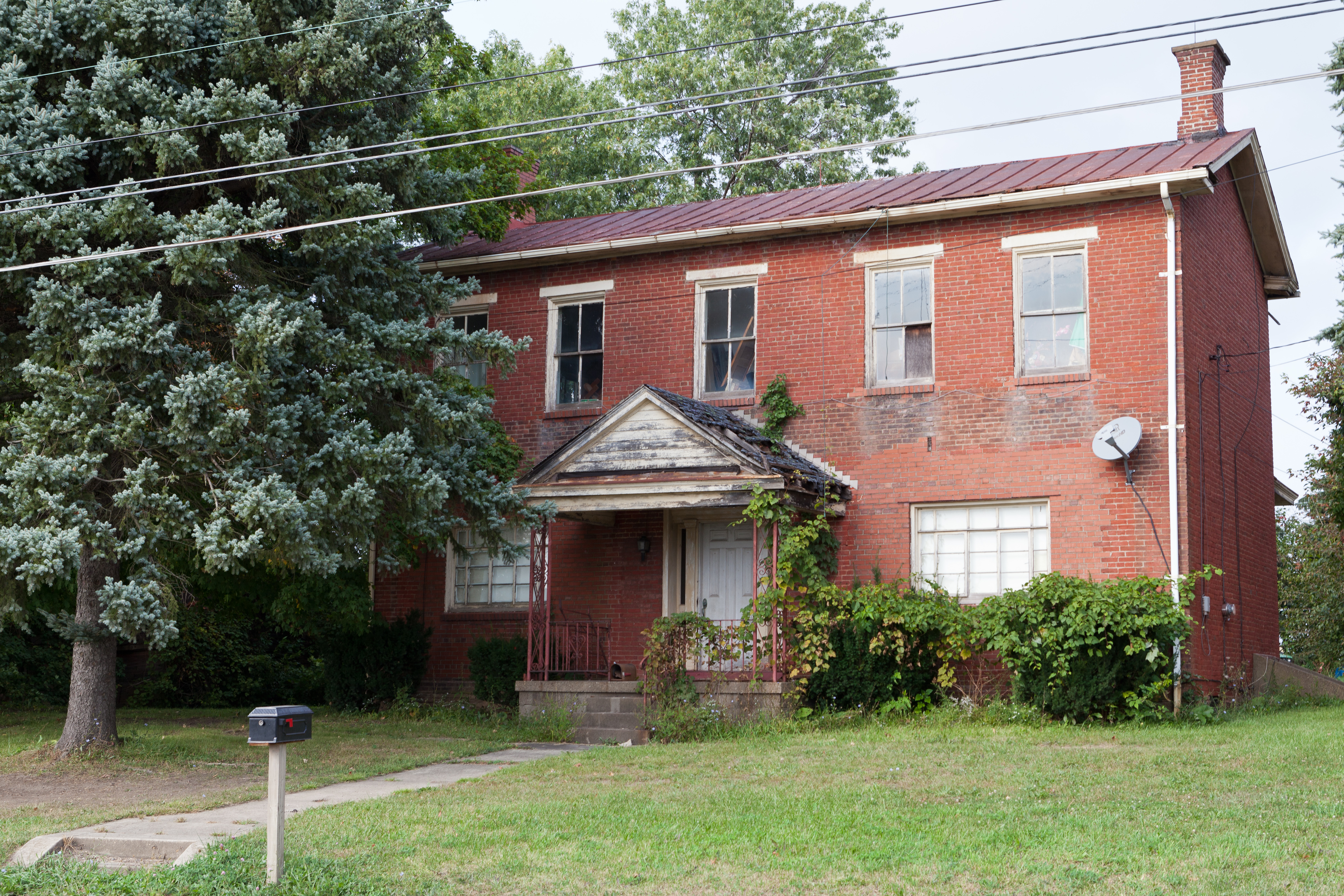
- The Doak-Little House, a historic site in the township

- Flag
- Motto: A Good Neighbor Community Since 1831
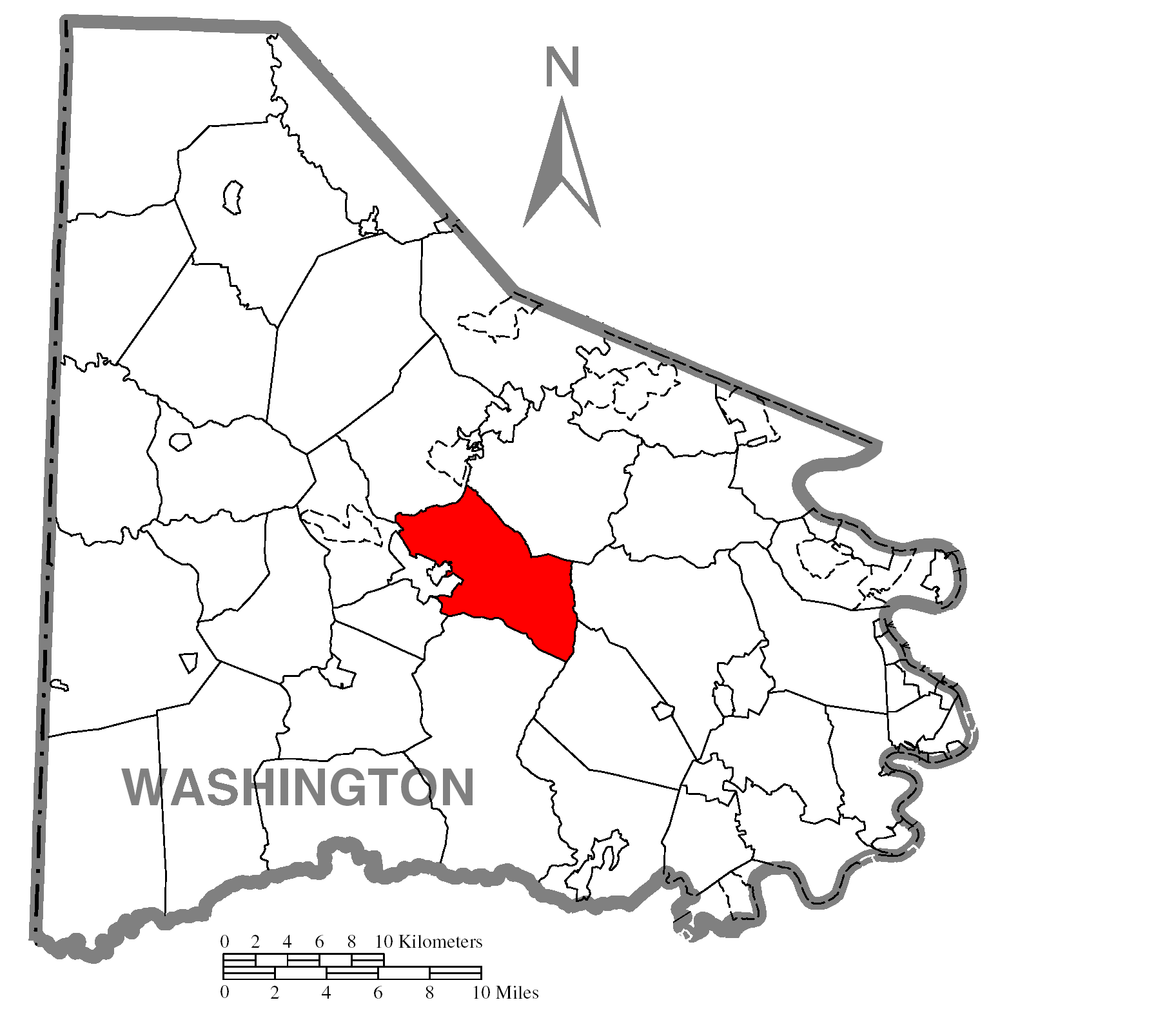
- Map of Washington County, Pennsylvania highlighting South Strabane Township

- Map of Washington County, Pennsylvania
- Country: United States
- State: Pennsylvania
- County: Washington
- Established: 1831

Government
  - Type: Council
  - Township Manager: Jeffrey L. Ziegler

Area
  - Total: 23.01 sq mi (59.59 km^{2})
  - Land: 23.00 sq mi (59.57 km^{2})
  - Water: 0.0039 sq mi (0.01 km^{2})

Population (2020)
  - Total: 9,616 ▲
  - Estimate (2021): 9,635
  - Density: 413/sq mi (159.5/km^{2})
- Time zone: UTC-5 (Eastern (EST))
  - Summer (DST): UTC-4 (EDT)
- Area code: 724
- FIPS code: 42-125-72504
- Website: South Strabane Township

Historical population
Census	Pop.	Note	%±
2000	7,987		—
2010	9,346		17.0%
2020	9,616		2.9%
2025 (est.)	9,672		0.6%
U.S. Decennial Census

South Strabane Township is a township in Washington County, Pennsylvania, United States. The population was 9,616 at the 2020 census. The township is named after the town of Strabane in County Tyrone, Northern Ireland.

== History ==
The Doak-Little House, Martin Farmstead, and Thomas Munce House are listed on the National Register of Historic Places.

== Geography ==
According to the United States Census Bureau, the township has a total area of 23.1 square miles (60 km^{2}), of which, 23.1 square miles (59.8 km^{2}) of it is land and 0.04% is water. It contains part of the census-designated place of Eighty Four.

== Surrounding neighborhoods ==
South Strabane Township has nine borders, including North Strabane Township to the north, Somerset Township to the east, North Bethlehem Township to the southeast, Amwell to the south, North Franklin Township to the southwest, Washington and East Washington to the west, and Canton and Chartiers Townships to the northwest.

== Demographics ==
As of the census of 2000, there were 7,987 people, 3,320 households, and 2,227 families residing in the township. The population density was 345.7 people per square mile (133.5 people/km^{2}). There were 3,444 housing units at an average density of 149.1 per square mile (57.6/km^{2}). The racial makeup of the township was 97.35% White, 1.58% African American, 0.05% Native American, 0.49% Asian, 0.01% Pacific Islander, 0.14% from other races, and 0.39% from two or more races. Hispanic or Latino of any race were 0.40% of the population.

There were 3,320 households, out of which 26.5% had children under the age of 18 living with them, 57.8% were married couples living together, 6.8% had a female householder with no husband present, and 32.9% were non-families. 30.1% of all households were made up of individuals, and 19.4% had someone living alone who was 65 years of age or older. The average household size was 2.34 and the average family size was 2.92.

In the township the population was spread out, with 20.7% under the age of 18, 4.5% from 18 to 24, 25.2% from 25 to 44, 25.9% from 45 to 64, and 23.7% who were 65 years of age or older. The median age was 45 years. For every 100 females there were 85.7 males. For every 100 females age 18 and over, there were 81.0 males.

The median income for a household in the township was $42,762, and the median income for a family was $54,729. Males had a median income of $41,684 versus $28,585 for females. The per capita income for the township was $23,829. About 3.1% of families and 6.4% of the population were below the poverty line, including 4.2% of those under age 18 and 12.1% of those age 65 or over.

== Commercialization ==
South Strabane Township has undergone a rapid burst of commercial and residential development starting in 1998. In this year, two new shopping centers, Strabane Square and Trinity Point, were constructed. The shopping centers sit astride Interstates 70 and 79, as well as US Route 19 and State Route 136. The township's location at the juncture of these major arteries, in addition to US Route 40, has played no small part in its rapid commercial development. A third major commercial center, The Foundry, opened in spring 2007. The Foundry has since closed due to land subsidence and all major stores have moved out.

A housing boom occurred simultaneously with the commercial development. Washington Woods and Washington Lake, two higher class developments, were recently finished. Villas on the Green, a development of primarily carriage/cluster homes, was also finished along Country Club Road. New housing starts include Cameron Estates, a development of nearly 150 single family units paralleled with another 150 ready made modular duplexes located along Cameron Road. Strabane Manor, a 232 unit townhouse complex, was recently started along Fischer Road. It sits opposite of the Stonecreek development, a developing apartment complex with over 200 units. In addition to these developments, The Preserve at Timber's Edge, a smaller development of houses clustered in the wooded areas along Lakeview Drive, was recently approved for development. In the works include a possible 'empty-nester' aimed development near the Route 19 corridor.

Most importantly, the township board of supervisors, in conjunction with the Washington County Redevelopment Authority and the Trinity Area School Board approved the Tax-Incremented Financing (TIF) Plan for Bass Pro Shops and Tanger Outlet Malls. These developments will be larger than all of the township's current developments and will be located alongside of Interstate 79. The developments will be located close to The Meadows Racetrack and Casino in neighboring North Strabane. Development plans include a large Outdoor World store, in addition to other Bass Pro Shops developments. Bass Pro also intends to install sizable outdoor recreational and test facilities for ATVs, boats, and hunting gear. Next to the Bass Pro Shops will be Tanger Outlet Malls, a company nationally known for its development of outlet malls. The outlet center, which is slated to hold over 150 stores, will be similar in composition to the Grove City Outlets, located north of Pittsburgh, but will be slightly larger than that development.

Also, a large development, located between US Route 40 and Interstate 70 in an area known as the 'Zediker Corridor', is in the planning stages through Consol Energy, Inc. Consol Energy, a company well known throughout southwestern Pennsylvania, is a large mining company that hopes to develop over 1,600 acres (6 km^{2}) with commercial offices. The areas around this development will be heavily developed with residential satellite developments. This development is over two times the size of the nearby SouthPointe, a development of commercial offices with some housing.
