= North Franklin Township, Pennsylvania =

Township in Pennsylvania, US

Coordinates: 40°09′08″N 80°15′50″W

North Franklin Township
- Township
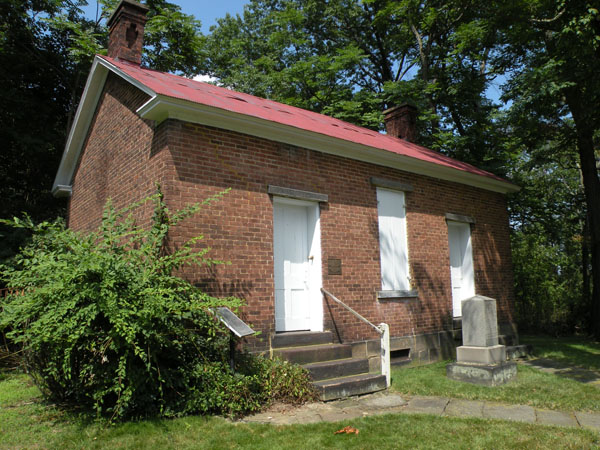
- LeMoyne Crematory, built in 1876, was the first crematory in the United States.

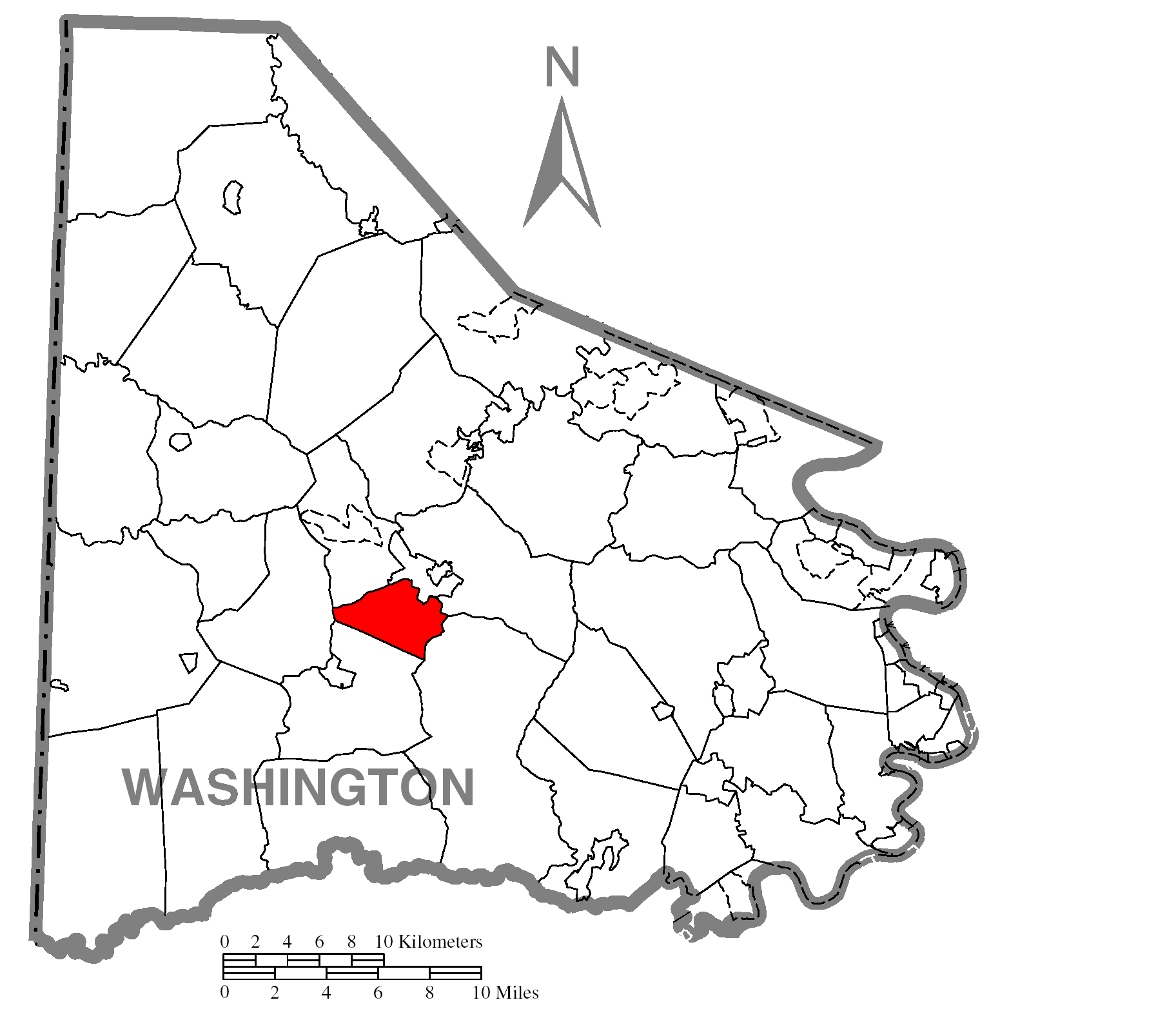
- Location of North Franklin Township in Washington County

- Location of Washington County in Pennsylvania
- Country: United States
- State: Pennsylvania
- County: Washington County

Area
  - Total: 7.46 sq mi (19.32 km^{2})
  - Land: 7.29 sq mi (18.89 km^{2})
  - Water: 0.16 sq mi (0.42 km^{2})

Population (2020)
  - Total: 4,826 ▲
  - Estimate (2021): 4,797
  - Density: 626.7/sq mi (241.97/km^{2})
- Time zone: UTC-4 (EST)
  - Summer (DST): UTC-5 (EDT)
- ZIP code: 15301
- Area code: 724
- FIPS code: 42-125-55040
- Website: www.northfranklin.org

Historical population
Census	Pop.	Note	%±
2000	4,818		—
2010	4,583		−4.9%
2020	4,826		5.3%
2025 (est.)	4,726		−2.1%
U.S. Decennial Census

North Franklin Township is a township in Washington County, Pennsylvania, United States. The population was 4,826 at the 2020 census.

== History ==
The LeMoyne Crematory and Trinity High School are listed on the National Register of Historic Places.

== Geography ==
According to the United States Census Bureau, the township has a total area of 7.4 square miles (19 km^{2}), of which, 7.3 square miles (19 km^{2}) of it is land and 0.2 square miles (0.52 km^{2}) of it (2.42%) is water.

== Demographics ==
At the 2000 census, there were 4,818 people, 1,964 households, and 1,325 families living in the township. The population density was 662.2 people per square mile (255.7 people/km^{2}). There were 2,052 housing units at an average density of 282.0 per square mile (108.9/km^{2}). The racial makeup of the township was 96.35% White, 2.41% African American, 0.17% Native American, 0.39% Asian, 0.06% from other races, and 0.62% from two or more races. Hispanic or Latino of any race were 0.35%.

Of the 1,964 households, 26.3% had children under the age of 18 living with them, 54.3% were married couples living together, 9.9% had a female householder with no husband present, and 32.5% were non-families. 29.5% of households were one person and 18.2% were one person aged 65 or older. The average household size was 2.34 and the average family size was 2.88.

The age distribution was 20.4% under the age of 18, 5.8% from 18 to 24, 23.2% from 25 to 44, 25.8% from 45 to 64, and 24.8% 65 or older. The median age was 45 years. For every 100 females there were 82.9 males. For every 100 females age 18 and over, there were 78.8 males.

The median household income was $37,516 and the median family income was $51,097. Males had a median income of $38,750 versus $25,672 for females. The per capita income for the township was $20,654. About 7.0% of families and 11.5% of the population were below the poverty line, including 11.0% of those under age 18 and 18.1% of those age 65 or over.
