= Eric Papenfuse =

American politician and businessman

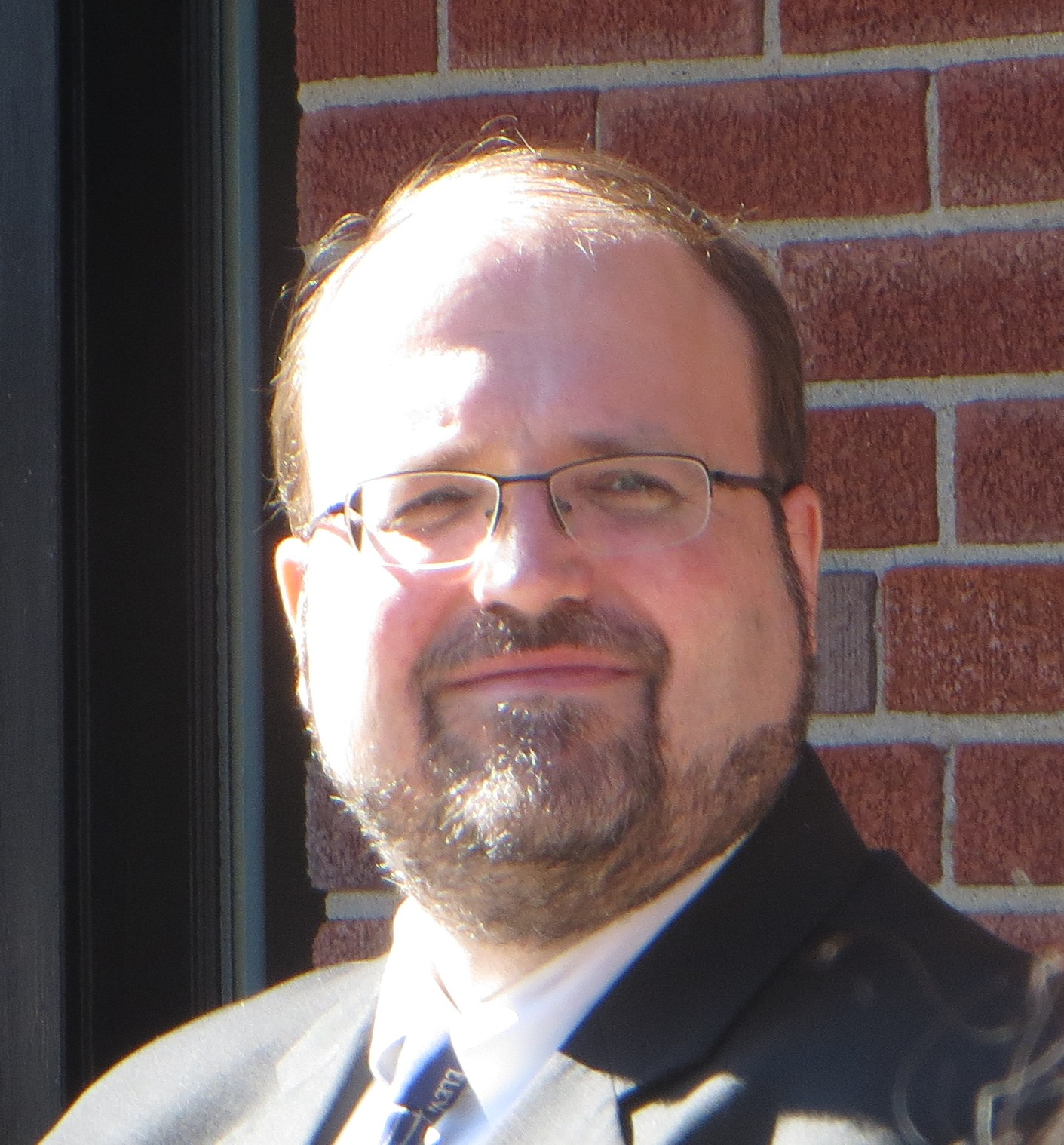

Mayor of Harrisburg
- In office January 6, 2014 – January 3, 2022
- Preceded by: Linda Thompson
- Succeeded by: Wanda Williams

Personal details
- Born: Eric Robert Papenfuse; September 4, 1971 (age 53); Baltimore, Maryland, U.S.
- Political party: Democratic
- Spouse: Catherine Lawrence
- Education: Yale University (BA, MA, MPhil)

Eric Robert Papenfuse (born September 4, 1971) is an American businessman and politician who served as the 38th Mayor of Harrisburg, Pennsylvania. Papenfuse is the founder and co-owner with his wife of The Midtown Scholar Bookstore in Harrisburg, which they have owned since 2001.

== Early life and education ==
Eric Papenfuse was born in Baltimore, Maryland on September 4, 1971. He attended the Boys' Latin School of Maryland, graduating in 1989 as the valedictorian. His father, Edward C. Papenfuse, is a retired Maryland state archivist. His mother, Sallie Papenfuse, is a reading teacher at The Boys' Latin School of Maryland. He spent a decade at Yale pursuing an undergraduate and graduate in history. At Yale, he wrote the book, The Evils of Necessity: Robert Goodloe Harper and the Moral Dilemma of Slavery, which was published by the American Philosophical Society in 1997.

== Career ==
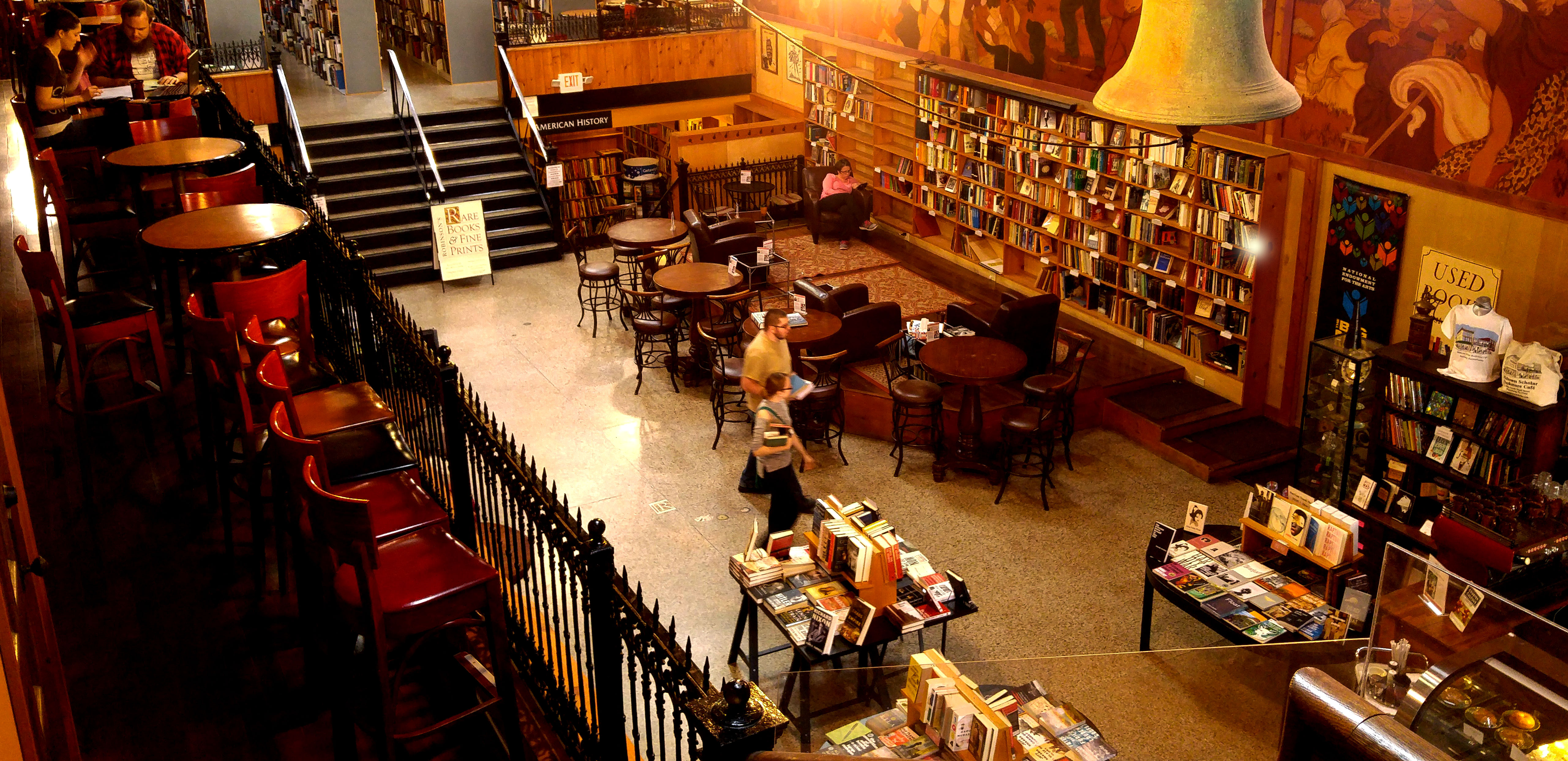
The main floor of the Midtown Scholar Bookstore where featured authors are hosted and events held

=== Midtown Scholar Bookstore ===
Papenfuse started the Midtown Scholar Bookstore in 2000 because he wanted a gathering place in Harrisburg "where people could talk about books, where they could have intellectually engaged ideas about all sorts of issues of the day" and "to listen to music, to drink coffee, to congregate." He envisioned his bookstore from the beginning as a Town Hall for the community.

The bookstore houses some 200,000 new, used and rare books as well as a warehouse full of over 2,000,000 books which are sold online. The Midtown Scholar is considered one of America's largest academic used bookstores and it is considered the driving force for the cultural revitalization of Harrisburg's Midtown. The New York Times book critic Dwight Garner described the bookstore as an "essentially religious experience. Vaut le voyage, as the Michelin guides like to say." In 2023, the bookstore won Publishers Weekly's Bookstore of the Year Award.

The Midtown Scholar has a coffee shop and a bakery run by P&R famous for their southern sweet potato pies. They host music concerts, author talks, book clubs and poetry readings. In the last year, the Midtown Scholar hosted the acclaimed author Salman Rushdie who presented his new novel The Golden House; Mark Bowden, the author of Hue 1968; Masha Gessen, a Russian-American journalist and critic of Putin; and Patricia Lockwood, whose poems have appeared in the London Review of Books and The New Yorker.

=== Politics ===
Papenfuse served briefly starting in January 2007 on Harrisburg's Authority board (now known as Capital Region Water) which had overseen Harrisburg's botched incinerator and had led the city to near bankruptcy with more than $300 million in debt. He resigned in November 2007 after a YouTube video showed him bringing up a mock Christmas gift list of strangely titled books for city officials. Beginning in 2007, Papenfuse investigated city financial records to discover a billion dollar "debt bomb" and then-Mayor Stephen R. Reed's use of tens of millions of dollars of public funds to purchase artifacts, some of which became in Reed's private possession; after a public balk, it wasn't until 2013 when state attorney general Kathleen Kane would take his claims seriously, ultimately leading to Reed's indictment.

After two unsuccessful Democratic primary bids in 2009 for a seat on the Harrisburg City Council and in 2011 for Dauphin County Commissioner, Papenfuse reentered politics in January 2013 with his announcement that he would run for Mayor of Harrisburg. He won the 2013 mayoral election which began his political career and in 2017 won a second term as mayor. Prior to his career as a bookstore owner and a mayor, he was a teacher of Latin for Central Dauphin East High School and Linglestown Junior High School.

=== Mayor of Harrisburg (2014–2022) ===
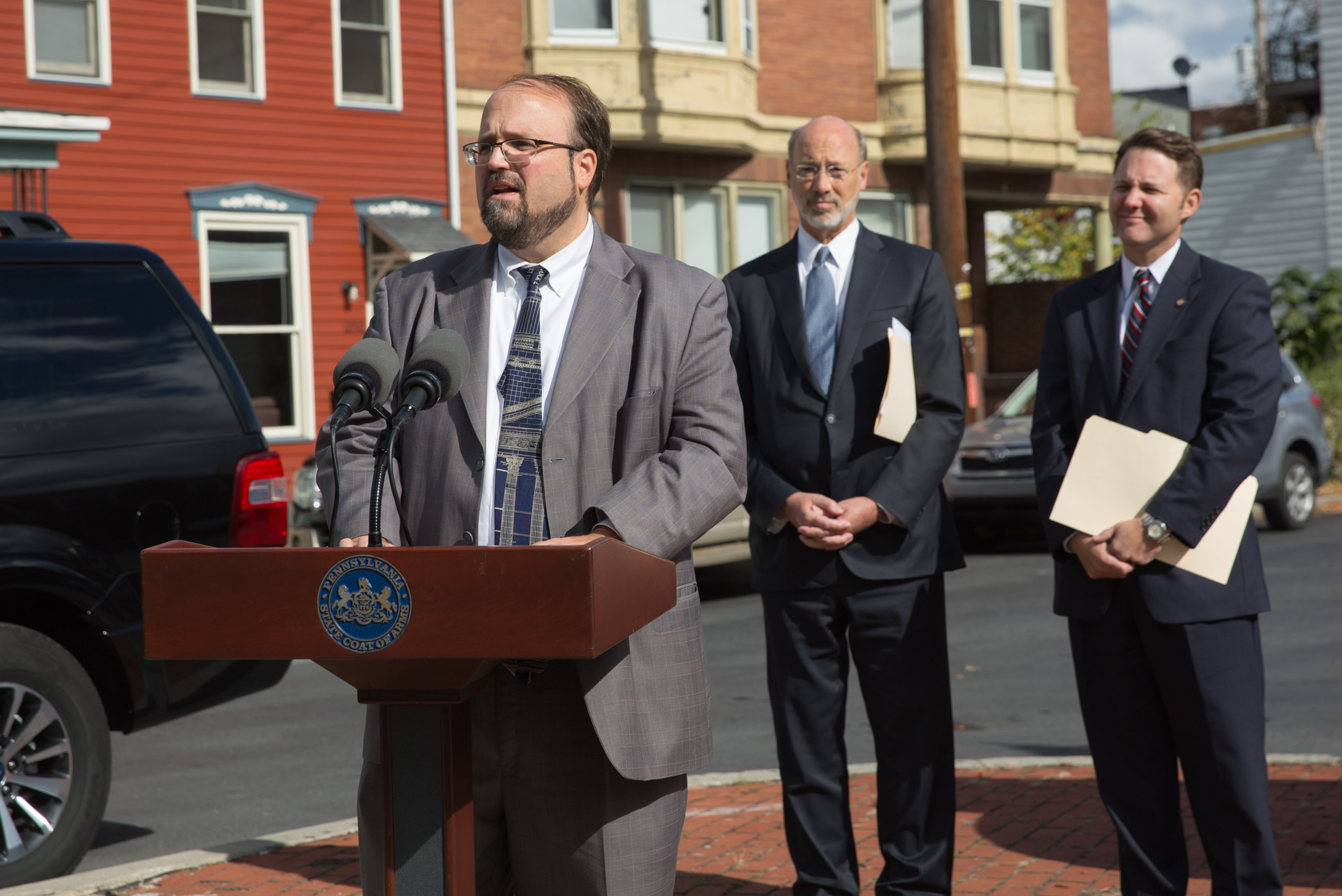
Mayor Papenfuse with Gov. Wolf in 2016 announcing $3 million in state funding toward revitalization project for Allison Hill

==== Comprehensive Plan ====
In the second year of his tenure as Mayor, Papenfuse initiated a Comprehensive Plan for the City of Harrisburg. The Plan was launched in 2015 and sought to encourage preservation of historic buildings, strengthen neighborhoods and the environment by promoting growth through improving the quality of life. The $200,000 Plan was to be completed in the Spring of 2016, but issues with the hired consultant, Bret Peters, of the Office of Planning and Architecture, lead to the City terminating the contract. In July 2020, the City of Harrisburg 2020 Comprehensive Plan (HBG 2020) was drafted. As of June 2021, final community input will be received for the last of the Public Hearings to be scheduled sometime in 2021 before adoption by City Council.

==== 2016 Patriot-News media ban ====
In 2016, The Patriot-News reported on two stories that dealt with Mayor Papenfuse. The first concerned that he owned 8 properties near the Third Street Cafe bar in which he had declared a business nuisance and sought its closure and the second is the uncovering of his avoidance of paying overtime for his employees for several years by the Department of Labor. On June 13, 2016, the same day that Donald Trump revoked The Washington Post's press credentials, Papenfuse issued a ban for the Patriot-News and directed his spokeswoman to no longer answer questions from the Patriot-News reporters and claimed that the reason was the Patriot-News being more like "Gawker ... not the equivalent of The Washington Post", yet journalists responded by saying it was in response to two news stories that delved into his business holdings and practices. Papenfuse's media censorship was featured by the Committee to Protect Journalists in Attacks on the Press: The New Face of Censorship.

==== Media reflections on tenure ====
TheBurg editor-in-chief Lawrence Binda cited City Finances, City Services, and Infrastructure among Papenfuse's most notable accomplishments during his two-term tenure. The city was able to run successive budget surpluses, obtaining good financial standing, and was able to double city staffing for its core services. Papenfuse made infrastructure a priority, rebuilding much of 3rd Street, beginning the two-way conversion of 2nd Street, implementing the city's first roundabouts, and seeding development in South Allison Hill, as well as most other neighborhoods. Binda asserted that the mayor should have "been more attentive to building and maintaining relationships," citing his feuds with City Council—among others—as his biggest downfall, despite attending council meetings (which both predecessors deemed beneath them). Also, Papenfuse's lack of public engagement was noted as another negative which Binda said "needs to be part of a mayor's routine schedule." Ultimately, Binda wrote that "Harrisburg is better for having had Eric Papenfuse as mayor for the past eight years."

Voters interviewed for a story with Fox 43 felt that a common perception was that Midtown "gets all the attention" from Mayor Papenfuse, with less development elsewhere.

== Electoral history ==
=== 2013 Harrisburg mayoral election ===
Papenfuse won a contested Democratic primary election in May 2013 by beating incumbent mayor Linda Thompson as well as Dan Miller and Lewis Butts. After losing to him in the primaries, Dan Miller, a Democrat, won the Republican nomination as a write-in and ran against Papenfuse in the general election as the Republican candidate . Papenfuse defeated him and several write-in candidates to win the mayor's seat on November 5, 2013. There was an unusual number of write-in votes for mayor, accounting for about 17% of the final vote. Papenfuse assumed office on January 6, 2014.

Harrisburg Mayoral primary results, May 21, 2013
Party	Candidate	Votes	%
Democratic	Eric Papenfuse	2,467	38.45%
Democratic	Dan Miller	2,066	32.2%
Democratic	Linda Thompson	1,810	32.2%
Democratic	Lewis Butts	64	0.01%
Total votes		6,415	100.0

Harrisburg Mayoral election results, November 5, 2013
Party	Candidate	Votes	%
Democratic	Eric Papenfuse	3,618	49.66%
Republican	Dan Miller	2,333	32.02%
N/A	Write-in	1,334	18.31%
Total votes		7,285	100.0

=== 2017 Harrisburg mayoral election ===
Papenfuse won a contested Democratic Primary in the run-up to the Mayoral Election on May 17, 2017, with 48.5% of the votes. Gloria Martin-Roberts won 38.2% of the primary vote. The vote between Papenfuse and Martin-Roberts was split evenly between Harrisburg's West side which favored Papenfuse to Harrisburg's East side which favored Martin-Roberts. On November 7, 2017, Papenfuse won a second, 4-year term as Mayor by a large margin with two of his opponents in the Democratic Primaries, Martin-Roberts and Lewis Butts, running as write-in candidates against him.

Harrisburg Mayoral primary results, May 16, 2017
Party	Candidate	Votes	%
Democratic	Eric Papenfuse	2,534	48.51%
Democratic	Gloria Martin-Roberts	1,997	38.23%
Democratic	Jennie Jenkins	490	9.38%
Democratic	Lewis L. Butts, Jr.	123	2.35%
Democratic	Anthony Thomas Harrell	70	1.34%
Total votes		5,223	100.0

Harrisburg Mayoral election uncontested, November 7, 2017
Party	Candidate	Votes	%
Democratic	Eric Papenfuse	3,786	88.31%
N/A	Write-in	501	11.68%

=== 2021 Harrisburg mayoral election ===
Papenfuse lost the May 18, 2021, Democratic Primary election to City Council President Wanda Williams by forty-six votes. On September 15, 2021, Papenfuse formally announced that he would run a write-in campaign in the November General Election. Williams won against Papenfuse in the general election by more than a 2–1 margin.

2021 Harrisburg mayoral Democratic primary results
Party	Candidate	Votes	%
Democratic	Wanda Williams	1,791	28.9%
Democratic	Eric Papenfuse (incumbent)	1,745	28.1%
Democratic	Dave Schankweiler	1,339	21.6%
Democratic	Otto Banks	1,243	20.1%
Democratic	Kevyn Knox	66	1.0%
Democratic	Write-ins	25	0.4%
Total votes		6,209	100%

== Personal life ==
He met his wife, Catherine Lawrence, in a graduate American history class at Yale University. After Lawrence and Papenfuse graduated from Yale University, in 1999 Lawrence received a position as an assistant professor of British history at Messiah College and they decided to move to Harrisburg. They found a large Victorian house on Front Street in Harrisburg's Shipoke neighborhood near the site of Harris' Ferry, the "most historic crossing place on the Susquehanna."

He is the founder with his wife of The Eric Papenfuse and Catherine Lawrence Endowment Fund in Film and Media Studies of the University of California Press Foundation which has supported eight books on film studies. Their Endowment Fund supports "provocative books on the aesthetics, politics, history and sociocultural implications of cinema and other forms of mass media."

== See also ==
- List of mayors of Harrisburg

Political offices
Preceded by Linda Thompson	Mayor of Harrisburg; 2014–2022	Succeeded by Wanda Williams
