= 2009 Harrisburg mayoral election =

- November 3, 2009
Candidate	Linda D. Thompson	Nevin J. Mindlin
Party	Democratic	Republican
Popular vote	4,883	4,032
Percentage	53.87%	44.48%
Mayor before election
Stephen R. Reed
Democratic
Mayor
Linda D. Thompson
Democratic

The 2009 mayoral election in Harrisburg, Pennsylvania was held on November 3, 2009, and resulted in incumbent Democratic mayor Stephen R. Reed, who had been mayor since 1982, losing in the primary to Linda D. Thompson who went on to defeat Republican Nevin J. Mindlin to become the city's first female and first black mayor.

== Background ==
Reed, dubbed "Mayor-for-Life," served seven terms as mayor of Harrisburg and was considered "Pennsylvania's most popular and successful mayor"; however, he faced mounting corruption and fraud accusations near the end of his term.

== Campaign ==
The growing discontent and mounting legal issues around Reed, coupled with an overall nationwide growth in Black voters, resulted in city councilor Linda Thompson to upset him in the primary. Harrisburg has a massive disparity in Republican and Democratic voters, highlighted by Republican candidate Nevin Mindlin winning the primary while having less votes than total Write-ins. Due to this many local pundits believed that the Republicans had no chance to win the election, however, Thompson would base her campaign on attacking Reed and white Democrats as a whole for being the reason the city has stumbled financially in recent years. This resulted in a lackluster Democratic showing for Thompson and even pushed many Democrats to vote for her Republican challenger. Thompson won the election, that had a 24.7% turnout, by only 842 individual votes with the party line being largely split down the city's ethnic line.

== Results ==
Mayor of Harrisburg, Democratic primary, 2009
Party	Candidate	Votes	%
Democratic	Linda D. Thompson	3,560	54.81%
Democratic	Stephen R. Reed (incumbent)	2,514	38.71%
Democratic	Les Ford	405	6.24%
Democratic	Write-ins	16	0.25%
Total votes		6,495	100.00%

Mayor of Harrisburg, Republican primary, 2009
Party	Candidate	Votes	%
Republican	Nevin J. Mindlin	423	49.30%
Republican	Write-ins	435	50.70%
Total votes		858	100.00%

Mayor of Harrisburg, 2009 general election
Party	Candidate	Votes	%
Democratic	Linda D. Thompson	4,883	53.87%
Republican	Nevin J. Mindlin	4,032	44.48%
N/A	Write-ins	150	1.65%
Total votes		9,065	100.00%
Democratic hold			

== See also ==
- 2009 United States elections
- List of mayors of Harrisburg, Pennsylvania
