= Roxbury News =

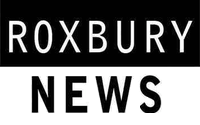
- Genre: News
- Owner: James Roxbury
- Parent: Independent
- Website: www.roxburynews.com

The Roxbury News is an independent video news company based in Harrisburg, Pennsylvania. The company is best known for producing news videos covering various city council and school board meetings, as well as Pennsylvania political and governmental events.

== Overview ==
The raw footage for the videos are recorded by freelance video teams hired by Roxbury. The editing and production is performed at company's office on State Street in Harrisburg, Pennsylvania, adjacent to the steps of the Pennsylvania State Capitol. The videos generally appear on the Roxbury News website, YouTube, and other video sharing sites.

== Impact of new stories ==
One of Roxbury News' famous videos, "Papenfuse X-mas Gift List," contains footage of former Harrisburg Authority board member Eric Papenfuse reading a list of mock Christmas gifts for city officials. The contents of the video were reported by the Central Penn Business Journal. The Central Penn Business Journal used footage from another Roxbury video as evidence to question the official story behind the firing of longtime Harrisburg Authority financial adviser Bruce Barnes. The Central Penn Business Journal, relying on the Roxbury News footage, noted that the firing happened shortly after Eric Papenfuse raised questions about a $27,000 bill from Barnes' firm. In another popular video, a Harrisburg School District board member excoriates a critic for making personal attacks on the District Superintendent.

In 2008, The Philadelphia Inquirer used Roxbury's footage from the 2006 "Bonusgate" trials in its coverage of the event.

== Grand jury subpoena ==
Roxbury News was among the media outlets, including the AP, The Morning Call, The Philadelphia Inquirer, the Philadelphia Daily News, The Citizens' Voice, that were subpoenaed to answer questions about their reports on the a grand jury investigation into political corruption surrounding the Mount Airy Casino Resort. Roxbury said that his company had "one or two" videos related to the grand jury testimony in question, but wasn't sure how helpful his testimony could be, saying "I don't know what they think I could offer them. The information is readily available." In July 2008, James Roxbury testified at a closed hearing before Dauphin County Judge Todd Hoover regarding the case. Roxbury's attorney, Adam Klein, told the Associated Press that his client had "cooperated without compromising his rights under either the Constitution or the Shield Law." On July 17, 2008, Judge Hoover quashed all 15 subpoenas, including the one for Roxbury News.

== Account hack ==
On January 13, 2008, apparent hackers compromised Roxbury's YouTube account and deleted all but 1 of 160 news videos stored on that site. On the only video not deleted, the hackers left a message saying "You should just quit...I've seen better work from an autistic 4th grader with an eye patch on and no hands to even operate the camera, so yeah i guess you can see by now how much your life is a joke." In a video response, Roxbury offered a $1,000 bounty for information leading to the identification of the perpetrators and noted that he was working with YouTube administrators officials and law enforcement officials on the matter. James Roxbury said that "We feel this has to be a criminal activity. We know the videos must be getting to somebody," and was able to restore the videos from backup sources.

== Burglary ==
In July 2008, the Roxbury News office was burglarized, with thousands of dollars in audio visual equipment missing, including three 40-inch monitors, and two high-definition Panasonic HDX200 cameras, and other accessories. Because data storage units containing backups of his news videos were not touched, Roxbury did not believe the burglary was politically motivated.
