= Papenfuss =

Papenfuss (German: Papenfuß) is a surname. It may refer to:

- Bert Papenfuß (born 1956), German poet and editor
- Tony Papenfuss (born 1950), U.S. actor

== See also ==
- Edward C. Papenfuse (born 1943), retired Maryland State Archivist and Commissioner of Land Patents
- Eric Papenfuse (born 1971), mayor of Harrisburg, Pennsylvania
