= 2025 Harrisburg mayoral election =

Local election in Pennsylvania, US

- November 4, 2025
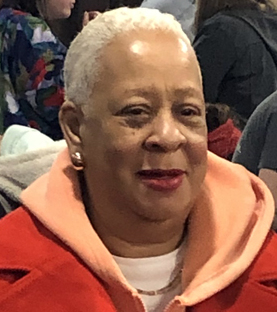

Nominee	Wanda Williams	Dan Miller
Party	Democratic	Republican (Note: Miller is a registered Democrat.)
Popular vote	5,145	3,873
Percentage	56.46%	42.50%
Mayor before election
Wanda Williams
Democratic
Elected mayor
Wanda Williams
Democratic

The 2025 mayoral election in Harrisburg, Pennsylvania will be held on November 4, 2025. One-term incumbent mayor Wanda Williams ran for re-election and won. Primary elections were held on May 20, 2025.

== Background ==
In October 2024, Harrisburg mayor Wanda Williams announced she would seek re-election. Four additional candidates announced their candidacy for mayor in the Democratic primary, with two serious challengers being City Councilman Lamont Jones and City Treasurer Dan Miller. Jones and Miller declared their candidacies in December 2024 and January 2025, respectively. Williams narrowly won the Democratic primary by 80 votes over Miller. While the Democratic primary was taking place, Miller won the Republican nomination after receiving enough write-in votes. Two months after the primaries, in July, Miller accepted the Republican nomination, though he stopped short of committing to a full general election campaign. On August 11, the last day to declare for the general election, Miller announced he would mount a general election bid for mayor as the Republican nominee. Miller likened the race to "a runoff between the top two candidates" from the Democratic primary. Despite the Democratic primary being closely contested, Williams rode a national Blue Wave to re-election, trouncing Miller.

== Democratic primary ==
Five candidates, including incumbent Mayor Wanda Williams, declared their candidacy for the Democratic nomination for mayor. The campaign for the Democratic nomination was contentious, reflecting the city's current political climate. Early in the campaign, Williams clashed with the city council, her opponent Councilman Lamont Jones, and City Treasurer Dan Miller. Among her criticisms, Williams claimed the city council was a "hindrance to progress" after vetoing several budget items. Shortly thereafter, Williams targeted Jones, who had announced his primary challenge before her remarks about the city council. In her attack, Williams questioned Jones' leadership ability, claiming he was not "community-related," while touting her own community involvement of "over 40 years." Prior to his declaration of candidacy, Treasurer Miller, held a press conference discussing unpaid trash bills, outlined his ideas for collecting the outstanding dues. Williams interrupted Miller's press conference to express her opposition to his plan, stating that the city was seeking a "collections attorney."

In March, Williams held a last-minute press conference to defend herself against an article published by The Patriot-News concerning a federal lawsuit filed against the city, which alleges nepotism within the city government.

Three debates were held, attended by all five candidates. Each debate was marked by tension and hostility between Williams and her two main opponents, Jones and Miller.

On Election Day, an altercation occurred between an individual associated with Jones against Williams at a polling location, resulting in an apology from Jones and disciplinary action for the aggressor. The individual in question had previously arranged interviews on behalf of Jones; however, Jones denied that he was his campaign manager, despite Williams' claim to the contrary.

Ultimately, in a closely contested election, Williams secured the Democratic nomination for re-election. The hostile environment of the primary was poorly received by voters, many of whom described the race as "horrible," leading to a record-low turnout. Voter turnout dropped by over 20% compared to the previous mayoral Democratic primary.

The primary election results were divided by the Norfolk Southern Harrisburg Intermodal Yard, with Williams losing support west of the yard while gaining support to the east. She lost the most support in Midtown, as well as in Downtown, South Harrisburg, and Uptown. The Allison Hill neighborhood was split along a north-south divide, with the northern portion swinging toward Williams and the southern portion swinging away from her. East Harrisburg saw a uniform swing towards Williams.

=== Nominee ===
- Wanda Williams, incumbent

=== Defeated in primary ===
- Lewis Butts Jr., perennial candidate
- Tone Cook Jr., gun violence activist known as "Street Mayor"
- Lamont Jones, City Councilman
- Dan Miller, City Treasurer, former controller and councilman, and Democratic candidate and Republican nominee for mayor in 2013

=== Endorsements ===
Dan Miller

Organizations

- LGBTQ+ Victory Fund

=== Debates ===
2025 Harrisburg Mayoral Democratic primary debates
No.	Date	Host	Moderator	Link	Democratic	Democratic	Democratic	Democratic	Democratic
Key: P Participant A Absent N Not invited I Invited W Withdrawn									
Key: P Participant A Absent N Not invited I Invited W Withdrawn					Butts Jr.	Cook Jr.	Jones	Miller	Williams*
1	April 22, 2025	WHTM-TV	Dennis Owens		P	P	P	P	P
2	May 7, 2025	WHP-TV	Joel D. Smith		P	P	P	P	P
3	May 13, 2025	WGAL-TV; Harrisburg University	Tasmin Mahfuz; Tom Lehman		P	P	P	P	P

=== Results ===
2025 Harrisburg Mayoral Democratic Primary
Party	Candidate	Votes	%
Democratic	Wanda Williams (incumbent)	1,729	35.34
Democratic	Dan Miller	1,649	33.70
Democratic	Lamont Jones	1,096	22.40
Democratic	Tone Cook Jr.	315	6.44
Democratic	Lewis L Butts Jr.	90	1.84
Write-in		14	0.29
Total votes		4,893	100.0

== Republican primary ==
No Republicans filed to be on the ballot for the primary. However, Democratic candidate and City Treasurer Dan Miller sent out mailers to Republicans asking them to write him in. The Pennsylvania Department of State has said that it takes at least 100 votes for a write-in campaign to be successful. Per the Dauphin County Registration and Elections, Miller won the parties nomination, receiving 112 write-in votes. On July 16th, the Dauphin County elections department stated Miller had accepted the Republican nomination. Miller has confirmed that, despite being the Republican nominee, he is "not a Republican".

=== Nominee ===
- Dan Miller, City Treasurer, former controller and councilman, Democratic candidate and Republican nominee for mayor in 2013, and Democratic candidate this election

=== Results ===
2025 Harrisburg Mayoral Republican Primary
Party	Candidate	Votes	%
Republican	Dan Miller (write-in)	112	44.3
Republican	Other write-in	90	35.6
Republican	Wanda Williams (incumbent) (write-in)	51	20.2
Total votes		253	100

== General election ==
Miller called for additional debates, telling WGAL he was available for a debate on September 30. Williams refused, informing the station that she will not debate. In a statement released by the city, Williams stated, “I simply do not care what he has to say. He wants publicity, and I am not giving it to him. Sorry, Dan, but I will not give you the platform you so desperately need. My focus is the City of Harrisburg, not some time-consuming back-and-forth banter with Dan Miller.”

=== Results ===
2025 Harrisburg mayoral election
Party	Candidate	Votes	%
Democratic	Wanda Williams (incumbent)	5,145	56.46
Republican	Dan Miller	3,873	42.50
Write-in		94	1.03
Total votes		9,112	100
