= Dave Madsen =

American politician

Member of the Pennsylvania House of Representatives from the 104th district
- Incumbent
- Assumed office January 3, 2023
- Preceded by: Sue Helm (redistricting)

Harrisburg City Councilman
- In office January 2, 2018 – January 3, 2023

Personal details
- Born: 1987 (age 38–39)
- Party: Democratic

Dave Madsen (born 1987) is an American politician who is currently the representative for Pennsylvania's 104th District. He had previously served as a member of the Harrisburg City Council for five years starting in 2017.

== Political career ==
=== Harrisburg City Council ===
Before being elected to the Pennsylvania House of Representatives, Madsen served as a member of the Harrisburg City Council for five years starting in 2017 as a Democrat. During his time as councilmen, Madsen fostered community outreach and worked as the AFL–CIO community services and education director. He was also the chair of the council's public works committee.

=== Pennsylvania's 104th District ===
Madsen announced he would run for Pennsylvania's 104th District as a Democrat which saw its longtime incumbent Republican Representative Sue Helm retire, as well as being redistricted to include Harrisburg. He ran on a campaign calling for increased funding for public education, workforce development and addressing infrastructure issues. He was endorsed by Dauphin County Commissioner George Hartwick and Harrisburg Mayor Wanda Williams, along with a number of Harrisburg, Steelton and county officials. In the election he faced off against Keystone candidate David Kocur. He defeated Kocur with 11,563 votes or 70.5% of the electorate to Kocur's 4,838 votes or 29.5% of the electorate.

Madsen took office at the opening of the Pennsylvania house on January 2, 2023.

== Election results ==
PA House election, 2022: Pennsylvania House, District 104
Party	Candidate	Votes	%	±%
Democratic	Dave Madsen	11,563	70.5	
Keystone	David Kocur	4,838	29.5	
Margin of victory		6,725	41	▲38.2
Turnout		16,401	100	
