= Marse Callaway =

Marse Callaway (born 1888) known as (Mr. Republican) was a black political boss and founder of the Baltimore Police Training School, a black policeman's training academy in 1937. He was elected as the President of an organization which aimed to bring together Republican voters, improve voter registration rates especially for the Republican party and to ensure the wellbeing of black people overall.

Callaway was a real estate broker and an influential figure in Republican Politics in Maryland. In 1923 when he became president of the Baltimore Republican Party. In 1935, Callaway led a lobbying effort to persuade the Maryland legislature to study the question of whether to make the historically black Morgan College a state institution. A legislative commission ended up making a recommendation in favor of transferring Morgan to the state of Maryland, a move that was finalized in 1937. He organised Theodore McKeldin's 1950 campaign for the position of Mayor of Baltimore. He was recognized at a meeting of over 1500 people at the Bethel AME Church in Baltimore in 1939 for his work.

Later in his life, Marse was charged with eight counts of receiving money under false pretenses and one count of failing to pay a former employee seven weeks wages. Twelve further charges of larceny after trust of funds paid by persons as deposits on pieces of property were added to the indictment to which he pleaded guilty. He was sentenced to a three-year suspended sentence and when summing up Judge Robert France asserted that Callaway had been "a respected and outstanding citizen in his own community and the city of Baltimore". Callaway was also ordered to pay restitution.

Marse Callaway died on May 19, 1952, at Provident Hospital.

== Bibliography ==
- "Governor Helps Bury 'Mr. GOP': 400 Others Attend Calloway Funeral" - The Baltimore Afro-American (1893-1988); May 31, 1952. p. 1-2.
- Fraser Smith, C. (2008). "Here Lies Jim Crow: Civil Rights in Maryland". Johns Hopkins University Press p107.
- "Callaway Testimonial Draws 1500" - The Baltimore Afro- American. Dec 30, 1939, p24
- Farrar, Hayward (1998) - The Baltimore Afro- American. Praeger p82
- Browne, Arthur (2016) - "One Righteous Man: Samuel Battle and the Shattering of the Color Line in New York. Beacon Press. p254
- Theoharis, Jeanne; Woodard, Komozi (2009) - "Want to Start a Revolution? : Radical Women in the Black Freedom Struggle" NYU Press p69.
- "Marse Callaway Held on 9 Counts" - The Baltimore Afro-American. July 30, 1949
- "Marse Callaway Put on Probation". The Baltimore Afro American. Nov 19, 1949. p7.
- "Marse Callaway, GOP Leader, Dies At 64". Afro American (1893-1988).
- "Many officials pay tribute at Marse Callaway funeral.". The Sun (1837-1991). May 24, 1952.
- "Maryland G.O.P. forms a state organization" - The Baltimore Afro-American. August 8, 1936.
