= Mavis Claytor-Ford =

African American Nurse

Mavis Claytor-Ford (born 1943) was the first black woman admitted to the University of Virginia (UVA) School of Nursing in Charlottesville, Virginia in 1968 and the first African American to receive a bachelor's degree from the school in 1970. She became one of the first black nurses to work at the university's hospital, paving the way for other black nurses in a newly desegregated Virginia.

Claytor-Ford started her training at Provident Hospital in Baltimore and worked as a surgical nurse in Roanoke. After receiving her bachelor's degree, Claytor-Ford's mentor recommended she pursue her master's degree, and she later earned a master's degree in mental health nursing in 1985. With her master's, Claytor-Ford began working at the U.S. Department of Veterans Affairs Medical Center in Salem, where she worked for 30 years and eventually retired as the chief nurse for geriatrics and extended care.
