= 2017 Harrisburg mayoral election =

- November 7, 2017
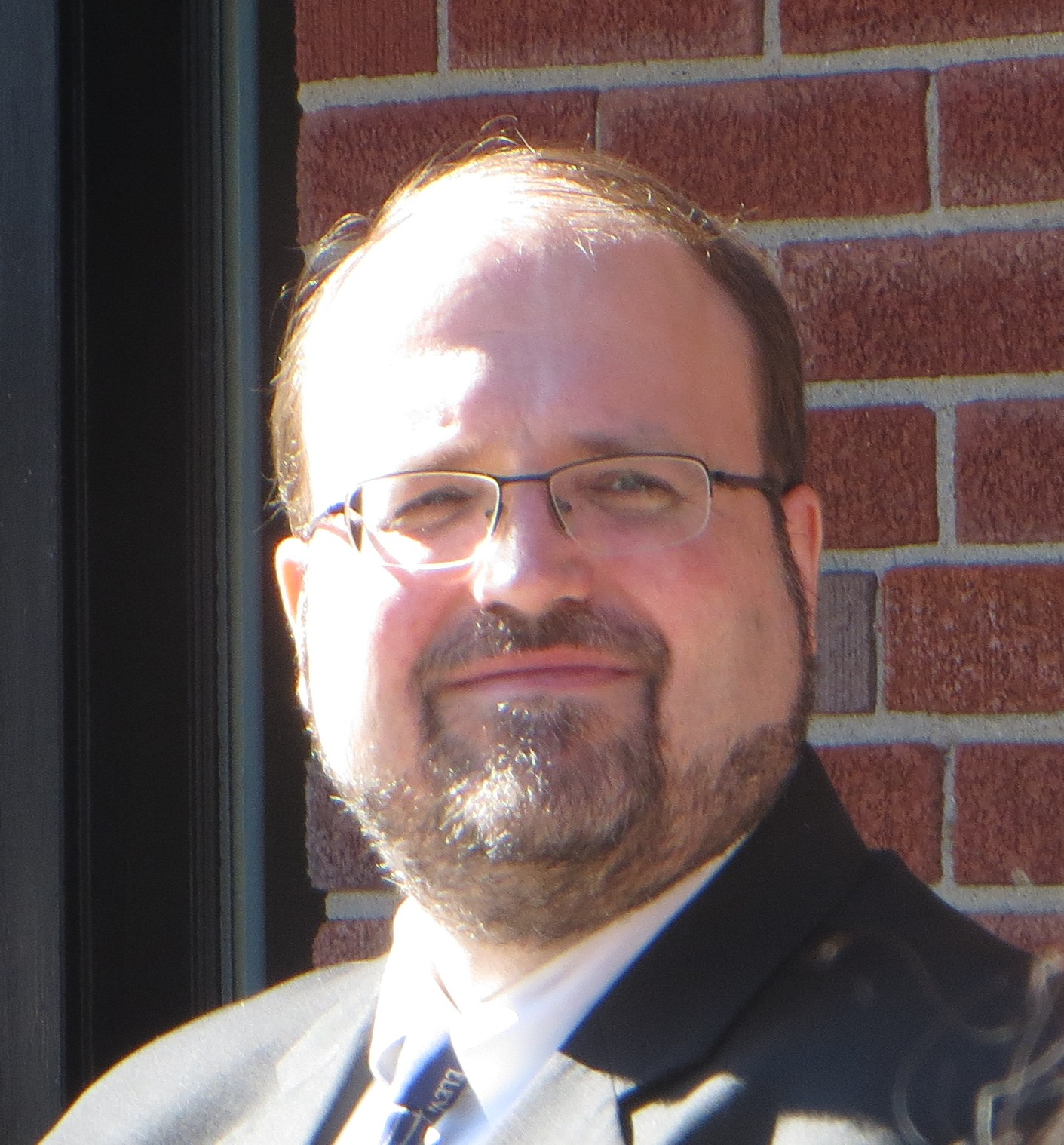
Candidate	Eric Papenfuse
Party	Democratic
Popular vote	3,788
Percentage	88.30%
Mayor before election
Eric Papenfuse
Democratic
Mayor
Eric Papenfuse
Democratic

The 2017 mayoral election in Harrisburg, Pennsylvania was held on November 7, 2017, and resulted in incumbent mayor Eric Papenfuse, a member of the Democratic Party, being re-elected to a second term.

== Background ==
Eric Papenfuse was elected mayor of Harrisburg in 2013.

== Campaign ==
Papenfuse was challenged in the Democratic primary by Lewis Butts, political newcomer Anthony Harrell, former police officer Jennie Jenkins, and former Harrisburg City Council president Gloria Martin-Roberts. A debate featuring the Democratic primary candidates was held on May 2, 2017.

Papenfuse was unopposed in the general election.

== Results ==
Mayor of Harrisburg, Democratic primary, 2017
Party	Candidate	Votes	%
Democratic	Eric Papenfuse (incumbent)	2,663	49.02%
Democratic	Gloria Martin-Roberts	2,053	37.79%
Democratic	Jennie Jenkins	507	9.33%
Democratic	Lewis Butts	125	2.30%
Democratic	Anthony Harrell	74	1.36%
Democratic	write-ins	11	0.20%
Total votes		5,433	100.00%

Mayor of Harrisburg, 2017 general election
Party	Candidate	Votes	%
Democratic	Eric Papenfuse (incumbent)	3,788	88.30%
N/A	write-ins	502	11.70%
Total votes		4,290	100.00%
Democratic hold			

== See also ==
- 2017 United States elections
- List of mayors of Harrisburg, Pennsylvania
