= Peter Kihlgård =

Swedish writer (born 1954)

Peter Kihlgård, born 10 April 1954 in Örebro, is a Swedish author, playwright and translator.

Kihlgård works across literary genres with a variety of artistic expressions. He is the author of acclaimed novels such as Fadder Teiresias vår (1988), the semi-autobiographical Strandmannen (1992), the experimental Anvisningar till en far (1996) and the popular love story Kicki & Lasse (2007), as well as of plays, prose poetry and short stories.

Kihlgård is also the Swedish translator of two Salman Rushdie novels.

== Bibliography ==
- 1982 – Manschettvisa
- 1982 – Hjälten
- 1985 – Ta rygg
- 1988 – Koncipieringen av en gädda (poetry)
- 1988 – Fadder Teiresias vår
- 1989 – Bedragaren
- 1990 – Tredje person
- 1992 – Strandmannen
- 1995 – Den dövstumme
- 1996 – Fars garage (with Lars Göran Persson)
- 1996 – Anvisningar till en far
- 1998 – Serenader
- 1998 – Diorama
- 2001 – Du har inte rätt att inte älska mig
- 2005 – Berättaren
- 2007 – Kicki & Lasse
- 2008 – Klockmalmens hemlighet
- 2015 – Serenader två

=== Translations ===
- 2016 – Två år, åtta månader och tjugoåtta nätter (Two Years Eight Months and Twenty-Eight Nights), by Salman Rushdie
- 2018 – Det gyllene huset (The Golden House), by Salman Rushdie
