= Sue Helm =

American politician (born 1943)

Susan C. Helm
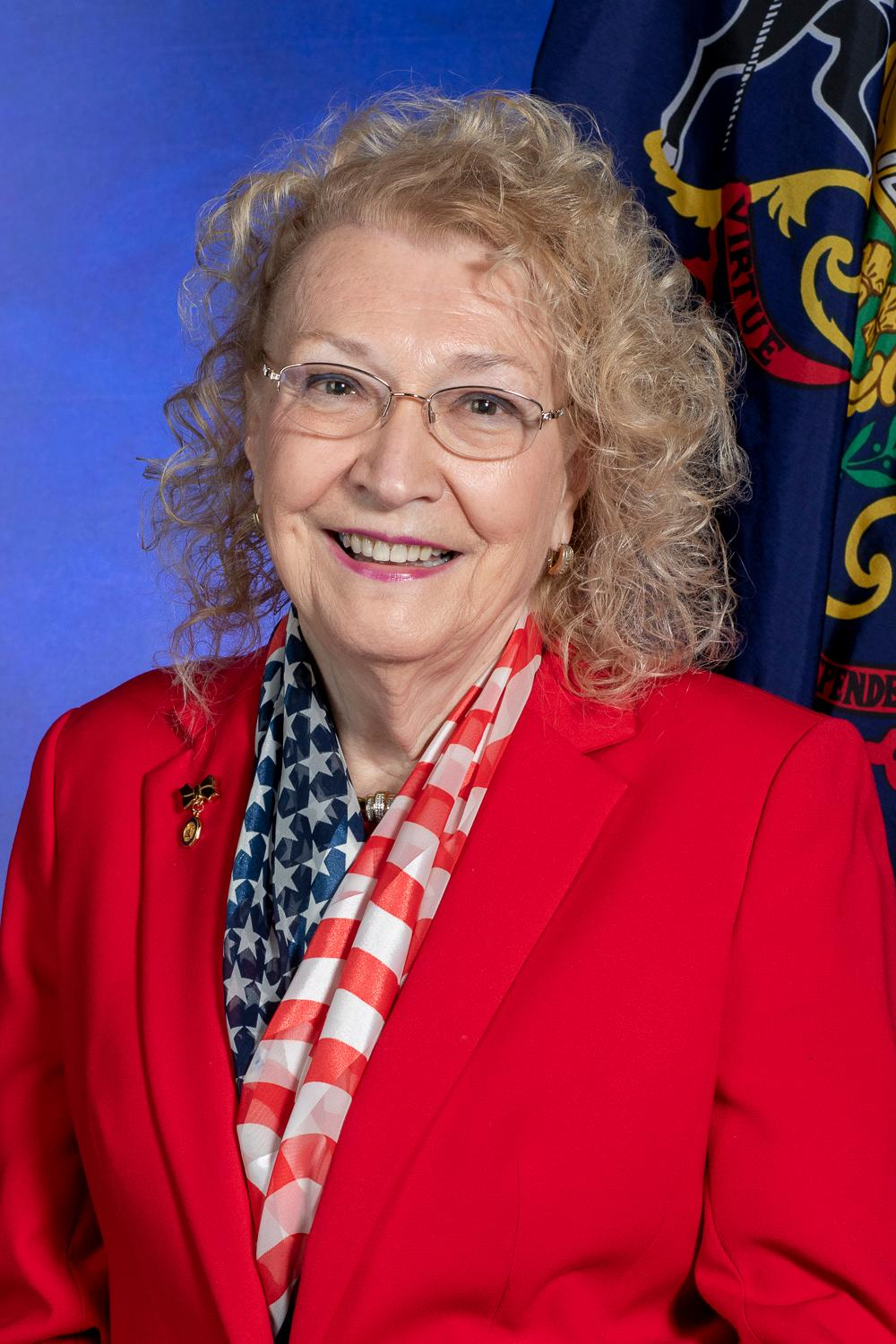

Member of the Pennsylvania House of Representatives from the 104th district
- In office January 2, 2007 – November 30, 2022
- Preceded by: Mark S. McNaughton
- Succeeded by: Dave Madsen

Personal details
- Born: December 12, 1943 (age 82) Harrisburg, Pennsylvania
- Party: Republican
- Education: Harrisburg Area Community College
- Occupation: Real estate broker
- Website: www.suehelm.net

Susan C. Helm (born December 12, 1943) is a former Republican member of the Pennsylvania House of Representatives for the 104th District and was elected in 2006.

Helm earned an associate degree from the Harrisburg Area Community College.

She worked as a Word Processing Manager for Capital Blue Cross from 1961 though 1986. Helm owned her own real estate broker agency, "Sue At The Helm Real Estate," a franchise of Century 21 Real Estate, from 1986 through 2006.

Helm was a candidate for Pennsylvania's 17th congressional district in 2004, losing the Republican nomination to Scott Paterno. She also served as a member of the Republican State Committee of Pennsylvania from 1994 through 2004. She was a delegate to the 1988, 1992, 1996, and 2000 Republican National Convention.

Helm sat on the Gaming Oversight and Tourism & Recreational Development committees while she was a state Representative.

On March 21, 2022, Helm announced she would not be seeking another term in office in the 2022 Pennsylvania House of Representatives election and would instead be retiring. There would be no Republican on the ballot where Democrat, Dave Madsen, defeated Keystone candidate David Kocur to take her seat.
