= Senator Shoemaker =

Senator Shoemaker may refer to:

- John Shumaker (1929–1999), Pennsylvania State Senate
- Lazarus Denison Shoemaker (1819–1893), Pennsylvania State Senate
- Mike Shoemaker (born 1945), Ohio State Senate
- Richard Shoemaker (1951–2026), Wisconsin State Senate
