= 2021 Harrisburg mayoral election =

- November 2, 2021
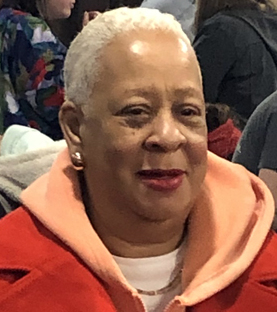

Candidate	Wanda Williams	Write-in votes	Tim Rowbottom
Party	Democratic	Write-in	Republican
Popular vote	4,402	1,911	465
Percentage	64.9%	28.2%	6.9%
- Precinct results Williams: 40–50% 50–60% 60–70% 70–80% 80–90%
Mayor before election
Eric Papenfuse
Democratic
Elected mayor
Wanda Williams
Democratic

The 2021 mayoral election in Harrisburg, Pennsylvania was held on November 2, 2021. Two-term incumbent mayor Eric Papenfuse, a member of the Democratic Party, ran for a third term, but lost the re-nomination to City Council President Wanda Williams. On September 15, 2021, Papenfuse formally announced that he would run a write-in campaign in the November general election. Williams won the general election against Papenfuse by more than a 2–1 margin.

== Background ==
Eric Papenfuse was first elected mayor of Harrisburg in 2013. He was re-elected to a second term in 2017.

== Democratic primary ==
=== Candidates ===
==== Nominee ====
- Wanda Williams, City Council President

==== Eliminated in primary ====
- Otto Banks, former City Councilman
- Kevyn Knox, General Manager of Harrisburg Midtown Arts Center
- Eric Papenfuse, incumbent Mayor
- Dave Schankweiler, businessman

==== Withdrew ====
- Lewis Butts Jr., perennial candidate

=== Results ===
2021 Harrisburg mayoral Democratic primary results
Party	Candidate	Votes	%
Democratic	Wanda Williams	1,791	28.9%
Democratic	Eric Papenfuse (incumbent)	1,745	28.1%
Democratic	Dave Schankweiler	1,339	21.6%
Democratic	Otto Banks	1,243	20.0%
Democratic	Kevyn Knox	66	1.1%
Write-in		25	0.4%
Total votes		6,153	100.0%

== Republican primary ==
=== Candidates ===
==== Declared ====
- Tim Rowbottom, businessman

=== Results ===
2021 Harrisburg mayoral Republican primary results
Party	Candidate	Votes	%
Republican	Tim Rowbottom	366	67.3%
Write-in		178	32.7%
Total votes		544	100.0%

== General election ==
=== Results ===
2021 Harrisburg mayoral election results
Party	Candidate	Votes	%
Democratic	Wanda Williams	4,402	64.9
Republican	Tim Rowbottom	465	6.9
Write-in		1,911	28.2
Total votes		6,778	100.0
Democratic hold			

== See also ==
- 2021 United States elections
- List of mayors of Harrisburg, Pennsylvania
