= Hagir S. Elsheikh =

Sudanese-American entrepreneur, advocate, author, and media host

- Education: Harrisburg Area Community College; Grand Canyon University
- Occupations: Entrepreneur; advocate; author; media host
- Website: hagirnetwork.com

Hagir S. Elsheikh is a Sudanese-American entrepreneur, advocate, author, and media host based in Pennsylvania. She is the founder of HSE Staffing Agency and Kareem's Mission, and serves on the board of trustees of Harrisburg Area Community College. Her work has been covered by regional media outlets including WITF, FOX43, PennLive, and TheBurg.

In 2025, Central Penn College awarded her an honorary Doctor of Humane Letters, she was named to City & State Pennsylvania's 40 in Their 40s list, and she was recognized in the Congressional Record for humanitarian service and community advocacy.

== Education ==
Elsheikh studied nursing at Harrisburg Area Community College and later earned a Bachelor of Science in nursing from Grand Canyon University in 2012. She was inducted into the Grand Canyon University Alumni Hall of Fame in 2019.

== Career ==
Elsheikh is associated with organizations in Central Pennsylvania including HSE Staffing Agency, Kareem's Mission, and Hagir Network. Kareem's Mission, founded following her son's autism diagnosis, has been featured by WITF, FOX43, and CBS21. She has also hosted The Hagir Show, a community-affairs program carried by PhillyCAM.

== Boards and community leadership ==
Elsheikh serves as a trustee of Harrisburg Area Community College. She has also served on the board of The Foundation for Enhancing Communities and the board of the World Affairs Council of Harrisburg.

== Honors and recognition ==
- Honorary Doctor of Humane Letters, Central Penn College (2025).
- City & State Pennsylvania – 40 in Their 40s (2025).
- Recognized in the U.S. Congressional Record for humanitarian service and community advocacy (July 16, 2025).
- Carolyne L. Smith Legacy Award, YWCA Harrisburg “Tribute to Women of Excellence” (2024).
- Women's History Garden Honoree, Civic Club of Harrisburg and WACH (2023).
- 'Woman of Influence, Central Penn Business Journal (2017).

== Publications ==
- Through Tragedy and Triumph: A Life Well Traveled (2019). ISBN 978-1091595958.
- Dreamer in Chains: Poems of Exile and Resilience (2023).
