= Mayor for life =

The tongue-in-cheek epithet Mayor for Life has been popularly applied to several long-serving mayors of American cities including:

- Jerry Abramson of Louisville, who was elected five times and served from 1986 to 1999 and from 2003 to 2011
- Marion Barry of Washington, D.C. (elected four times, served from 1979 to 1991 and 1995 to 1999)
- Tom Bradley (American politician) of Los Angeles (elected five times, served from 1973 to 1993)
- Buddy Cianci of Providence, Rhode Island, who served from 1975 and 1984 and from 1991 to 2002, leaving office twice due a felony conviction in 1984 and a corruption scandal in 2002
- Richard J. Daley of Chicago (elected six times, served from 1955 to his death in 1976)
- Richard M. Daley of Chicago (son of the above, also elected six times, served from 1989 to 2011)
- Thomas Menino of Boston, who was elected five times and served from 1993 to 2014
- Stephen R. Reed of Harrisburg (elected seven times, served from 1982 to 2010)
