= Nate Davidson =

American politician from Pennsylvania

Nathan Davidson

Member of the Pennsylvania House of Representatives from the 103rd district
- Incumbent
- Assumed office December 1, 2024
- Preceded by: Patty Kim

Personal details
- Party: Democratic
- Website: www.natedavidson.com

Nathan (Nate) Davidson is an American politician that represents the 103rd district of the Pennsylvania House of Representatives as a Democrat since 2024.

== Early life and education ==
Davidson grew up in Dauphin County, Pennsylvania. He graduated from Messiah College.

== Career ==
Davidson worked as a senior advisor on the Pennsylvania House Appropriations Committee.

In 2023, the Harrisburg City Council appointed Davidson to the Board of Capital Region Water.

Davidson defeated four other Democrats in the 2024 primary for the 103rd district House race, including Mercedes Evans.
