= Edward C. Papenfuse =

Maryland State Archivist and Commissioner of Land Patents

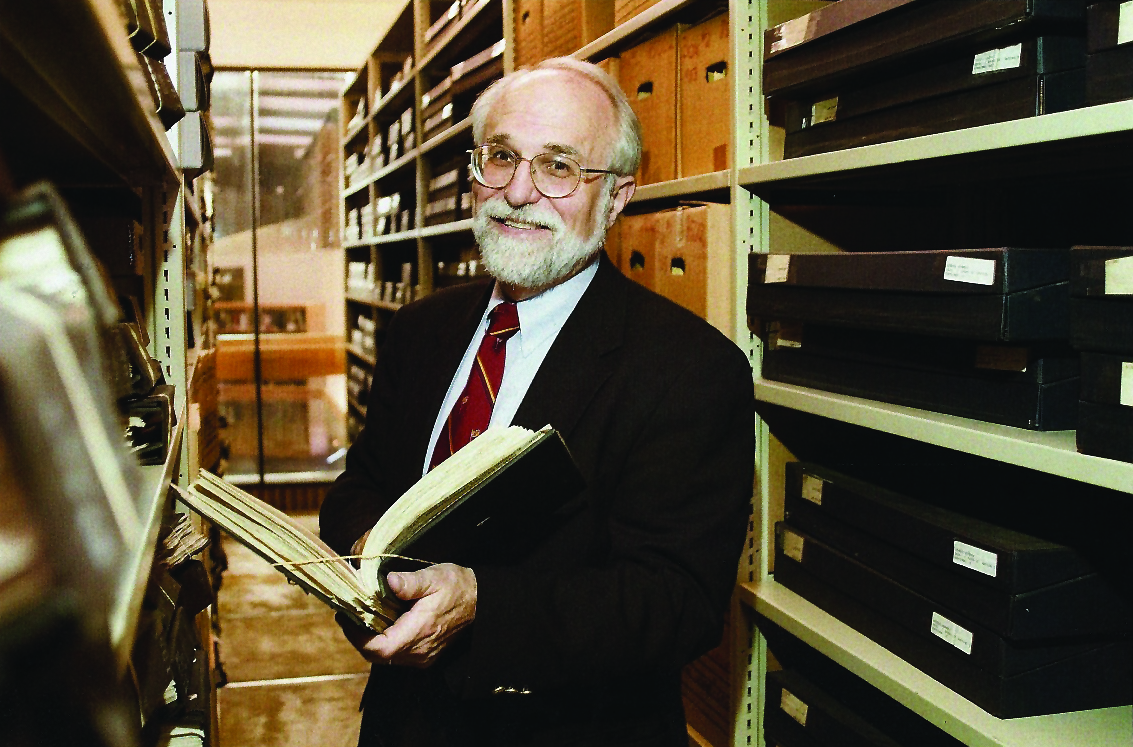
- Papenfuse in November 2010

Maryland State Archivist and Commissioner of Land Patents
- In office 1975–2013
- Preceded by: Morris L. Radoff
- Succeeded by: Timothy D. Baker

Personal details
- Born: October 15, 1943 (age 82) Toledo, Ohio, U.S.
- Spouse: Sallie Craig Fisher
- Children: 2, David and Eric Papenfuse
- Education: American University; University of Colorado; Johns Hopkins University

Edward C. Papenfuse (born October 15, 1943) is the retired Maryland State Archivist and Commissioner of Land Patents.

Papenfuse received his undergraduate degree from the American University, an M.A. from the University of Colorado, and a Ph.D. in history from The Johns Hopkins University. He holds an honorary doctorate of letters from Washington College. His son Eric is the former mayor of Harrisburg, Pennsylvania.

== Biography ==
Papenfuse held the positions of Maryland State Archivist and Commissioner of Land Patents from 1975 until 2013. He succeeded Morris L. Radoff to the office and was succeeded himself by Timothy D. Baker. As director of the Maryland State Archives in Annapolis, Papenfuse was responsible for the Archives' collection of government and private materials which are described and inventoried in detail at mdsa.net, Guide to Government Records and the Guide Special Collections. In 2003, he conceptualized and initiated the design of mdlandrec.net, which contains over 200,000,000 indexed images of permanent archival records and has public usage statistics. In addition he has created an interactive editorial website for archival documents which currently accesses over 500,000 pages of original source material on the experimental web sites, Remembering Baltimore, mdhistory.net, and transcribedoc.net. The Baltimore Sun chronicled the beginning and ending of Papenfuse's career in articles published on October 14, 1975, and November 4, 2013. From June 2010 until October 2013, he was also the acting City Archivist for the Baltimore City Archives, becoming a catalyst for change in an archives in disrepair.

Papenfuse played a major role in the design of the present Archives building which was completed in 1986 and bears his name, initiated the creation of the Maryland State Archives web site, writes extensively on Maryland history, and has taught history at the University of Maryland College Park, the University of Maryland Law School, and the Johns Hopkins University. He is the author of numerous articles and books, including In Pursuit of Profit: The Annapolis Merchants in the Era of the American Revolution (1975), with Joseph M. Coale, The Hammond-Harwood House Atlas of Historical Maps of Maryland, 1608–1908 (1982) and The Maryland State Archives Atlas of Historical Maps of Maryland 1608–1908 (2003). He has also developed an approach to providing reference services and teaching courses on the Internet. The Baltimore City Archives website, for which he designed the organizational framework and wrote most of the introductory text, is devoted to preserving and accessing the public records of the Baltimore City Archives. Papenfuse has published numerous articles on archives and archival-related matters including a report on access to government records in the OAH Newsletter. In April 2011, he was designated a digital pioneer and interviewed by the Library of Congress about his career.

As Commissioner of Land Patents, Papenfuse presided as an administrative judge over questions relating to original title in Maryland, and was responsible for overseeing the granting of a number of land grants based upon thorough research and documentation. He explains the process at length in a published opinion that was decided in his favor and which incorporated his research of the process into the opinion.

Papenfuse was behind Maryland's 2007 acquisition of the original final draft of George Washington's military resignation speech (given in December 1783 to the Congress of the Confederation at Annapolis). After his speech, Washington folded the draft and gave it to a member of Congress, whose family had passed it down through future generations.

== Works ==
- In Pursuit of Profit: The Annapolis Merchants in the Era of the American Revolution. (Baltimore: The Johns Hopkins University Press, 1975).
- Maryland: A New Guide to the Old Line State. (Baltimore: The Johns Hopkins University Press, 1976). With Gregory A. Stiverson, Susan A. Collins, Lois Green Carr.
- Law, Society & Politics. The Proceedings of the First Conference on Maryland History. (Baltimore: Johns Hopkins University Press, 1977). With Aubrey C. Land and Lois Green Carr.
- An Inventory of Maryland State Papers, Part I, The Revolutionary War Era, 1775–1789. (Annapolis: Maryland Hall of Records, 1977). With Gregory A. Stiverson and Mary D. Donaldson.
- A Biographical Dictionary of the Maryland Legislature, 1635–1789. (Baltimore: The Johns Hopkins University Press, 1979, 1985). With David Jordan, Alan Day, Gregory A. Stiverson.
- A Guide to the Maryland Hall of Records: Local, Judicial, and Administrative Records on Microform. (Annapolis: Maryland Hall of Records, 1978). With Susan A. Collins and Christopher Allan.
- The Maryland State Archives Atlas of Historical Maps of Maryland. (Baltimore: The Johns Hopkins University Press, 2003). With Joseph M. Coale III.
- Magna Charta For America. (Philadelphia; The American Philosophical Society, 1986). With Jack P. Greene and Charles F. Mullett.
- Outline, Notes and Documents Concerning Barron v Baltimore, 32 U.S. 243
- Doing good to posterity : the move of the capital of Maryland from St. Mary's City to Ann Arundell Towne, now called Annapolis.Maryland State Archives, 1995.
- Lincoln in Annapolis, February 1865 by Toews, Rockford E. (Introduction by Edward C. Papenfuse), [Annapolis] Maryland State Archives 2009
- Where Have All the Flowers Gone? in Isaac Shearn and Elgin Klugh, A Place for Memory, Baltimore's Historic Laurel Cemetery, 2023

== Awards ==
- Elected fellow of the Society of American Archivists, 1978
- Marylander of the Year award of the Maryland Colonial Society, 1985
- Distinguished Service to State Government Award, The National Governor's Association, 1985
- Elected to membership in the American Antiquarian Society in 1987
- Awarded the Calvert Prize of the Maryland Historical Trust, 1988
- FGS Directors Award for distinguished public service in support of Genealogy, 1988
- Speakers Medallion awarded by the Maryland House of Delegates, 2014

== Personal life ==
Papenfuse and his wife Sallie have two sons, a daughter-in-law, and three grandchildren.
