= Golden House (disambiguation) =

Golden House, or Domus Aurea, was a large palace built by the Emperor Nero in the heart of ancient Rome.

Golden House or The Golden House may also refer to:

- The Golden House, a tourist attraction in Hong Kong
- The Golden House (novel), a 2017 novel by Salman Rushdie
- Golden House (TV series), a 2010 South Korean television series
- C. S. Golden House, a historic house in Thomaston, Alabama
- Ca' d'Oro, in Venice, Italy
- Sunehri Kothi, Tonk (lit. 'Golden House'), a bungalow in Tonk, Rajasthan, India

== See also ==
- Golden Palace (disambiguation)
