= Ron Buxton =

American politician (1949–2021)

Ronald I. Buxton

Member of the Pennsylvania House of Representatives from the 103rd district
- In office January 5, 1993 – December 31, 2012
- Preceded by: Peter Wambach
- Succeeded by: Patty Kim

Personal details
- Born: March 23, 1949 Steelton, Pennsylvania
- Died: June 18, 2021 (aged 72) Harrisburg, Pennsylvania
- Party: Democratic
- Education: Harrisburg Area Community College
- Occupation: Legislator

Ronald I. Buxton (March 23, 1949 – June 18, 2021) was a Democratic member of the Pennsylvania House of Representatives. Buxton represented the 103rd District in Dauphin County, including a large section of the city of Harrisburg, from 1993 until 2012, when he decided not to seek reelection to an 11th term.

== Early life and education ==
Buxton was born in Steelton, Pennsylvania, on March 29, 1949. He graduated from Susquehanna Township High School in 1967 and received an associate degree from Harrisburg Area Community College in 1971.

== Career ==
From 1971 to 1979, Buxton served as a member of the Susquehanna Township Board of Commissioners, and was president of the commission for the last two years of his tenure.

Buxton unsuccessfully ran for Pennsylvania State Senate in 1980. In 1992, he successfully ran for the Pennsylvania House of Representatives and served for the next twenty years, being reelected nine times. He was Majority Caucus Administrator for his last two sessions in office. Buxton was a member of the Pennsylvania Higher Education Assistance Agency from 2001 to 2008 and a member of the Capitol Preservation Committee from 2009 to 2012. Buxton opted not to run for reelection to another term in 2012.

After leaving the state House, Buxton served as a member of the Dauphin County Redevelopment Authority from 2013 to 2015.
