= Linda D. Thompson =

American politician (born 1960)

- Thompson in 2010

Mayor of Harrisburg
- In office January 4, 2010 – January 6, 2014
- Preceded by: Stephen R. Reed
- Succeeded by: Eric Papenfuse

Personal details
- Born: 1960 (age 65–66)
- Party: Democratic

Linda Deliah Thompson (born 1960) is an American politician and former mayor of Harrisburg, Pennsylvania serving from January 4, 2010, until January 6, 2014. Thompson was Harrisburg's first female and first black mayor. In 2016 Thompson established LDT Ministries.

== Early life ==
Born and raised in Harrisburg, Thompson graduated from Harrisburg High School in 1979. She went on to attend Howard University in Washington, DC where she received a B.S. in Communications. While in Washington, Thompson interned at the United States Department of Justice.

== Political career ==
=== 2001 City Council race ===
In 2001, Thompson was elected to serve on the Harrisburg City Council. She was re-elected and appointed President of City Council in 2005. While on council, Thompson introduced legislation to sell off city-owned Western artifacts in order to raise money to pay down debts. She also amended the 2009 budget to include $100,000 to pay for a citywide bulk trash pickup.

=== 2009 Mayoral race ===
Thompson decided not to run for re-election in 2009 and instead ran for the Democratic nomination for Mayor. In the May primary, Thompson beat former mayor Stephen R. Reed by nearly 1,000 votes to win the election. Despite her upset win in the Democratic primary, Thompson went on to win the general election by only about 800 votes against Republican challenger Nevin Mindlin. Failure to reach an agreement on how to assign the budget and what should or should not be included, as well as an Act 47 proposal by the state turned down by the City Council, led to a fiscal emergency she attempted to resolve.

=== 2013 Mayoral race ===
In the primaries for the 2013 Harrisburg mayoral election Thompson was defeated for re-nomination as mayor by Harrisburg businessman Eric R. Papenfuse, who won the primary, and City Controller Dan Miller, who placed second.

=== 2014 US House of Representatives race ===
Thompson was the Democratic nominee for the 4th Congressional District of Pennsylvania in 2014. She was defeated by incumbent Republican Scott Perry.

=== 2022 State House of Representatives race ===
In March 2022, Thompson announced a run against Heather MacDonald and incumbent Patty Kim for the103rd District seat in the state House of Representatives. In April of that year, Thompson announced that she was dropping out of the race.

== Controversies ==
Widespread criticisms of Thompson's management style came early and throughout her mayoral tenure, and was reported referring to City Controller Dan Miller as "that homosexual, evil little man," causing staffers to resign. Valentine's Day 2011 brought a "Show Your Love for Harrisburg: Demand Linda Thompson Resign" rally in the plaza outside of City Hall of over 200 protesters, where she stood at the window and mocked her detractors with hand gestures and mouthed "I'm staying". In late March 2013 as Mayor Thompson was discussing the privatization of city waste collection, she stated, "We're not opening up our flood gates for some scumbag that comes from Perry County who … comes here and wants to dump for free." The comment brought about a firestorm of backlash.

== See also ==
- List of mayors of Harrisburg
- Harrisburg City Council
- List of first African-American mayors

Political offices
| Preceded by Stephen R. Reed | Mayor of Harrisburg; 2010–2014 | Succeeded by Eric Papenfuse |
