= William Lentz =

American politician

William B. Lentz

Member of the Pennsylvania Senate from the 15th district
- In office January 5, 1965 – November 30, 1976
- Preceded by: M. Harvey Taylor
- Succeeded by: George Gekas

Personal details
- Born: May 14, 1920 Millersburg, Pennsylvania, US
- Died: September 18, 1977 (aged 57) Harrisburg, Pennsylvania, US
- Party: Republican

William B. Lentz (May 14, 1920 – September 18, 1977) is an American politician from Pennsylvania who served as a Republican member of the Pennsylvania State Senate for the 15th district from 1965 to 1976.

== Biography ==
Lentz was born on May 14, 1920, in Millersburg, Pennsylvania to Charles Warren and Minnie (Reigle) Lentz, the fifth child of seven children.

Along with four of his six brothers, Staff Sgt. William B. Lentz served in the U.S. Army in World War II.

He defeated M. Harvey Taylor, the President pro tempore of the Pennsylvania Senate, to serve as a member of the Pennsylvania Senate for the 15th district from 1965 to 1976.

He died on September 18, 1977, in Harrisburg, Pennsylvania.

== See also ==
- Politics of the United States
