= H. Joseph Hepford =

American politician

Member of the Pennsylvania House of Representatives from the 104th district
- In office January 7, 1969 – November 30, 1976
- Preceded by: District Created
- Succeeded by: Jeff Piccola

Member of the Pennsylvania House of Representatives from the Dauphin County district
- In office January 1, 1963 – November 30, 1968

Personal details
- Born: July 1, 1924 Lower Paxton Township, Pennsylvania, US
- Died: March 22, 2010 (aged 85) Dalton, Pennsylvania, US
- Party: Republican

H. Joseph Hepford (July 1, 1924 – March 22, 2010) is a former Republican member of the Pennsylvania House of Representatives.
