= Central Dauphin High School =

Location
- 437 Piketown Rd. Harrisburg, Pennsylvania 17112
- Coordinates: 40°21′01″N 76°45′36″W

Information
- Former name: Central Dauphin Senior High School
- Type: Public high school
- Established: 1955
- Locale: Suburban: Large
- Sister school: Central Dauphin East High School
- School board: Central Dauphin School Board
- School district: Central Dauphin School District
- NCES District ID: 4205400
- Superintendent: Eric Turman
- CEEB code: 391645
- NCES School ID: 420540001745
- President: Michael Jacobs
- Board Representatives: Mr. Michael Jacobs, Mr. Eric Epstein, Mr. David Doernemann, Mr. Jeff Gordon, Mrs. Lauren Silvers
- Head Principal: Dr. Eric Shrader
- Freshman Principal: Mr. Justin Newkam
- Sophomore Principal: Ms. Kristen Herb
- Junior Principal: Mr. Joshua Burkhart
- Senior Principal: Mr. Jeff Beeman
- Teaching staff: 124.56 (FTE)
- Grades: 9-12
- Enrollment: 1,998 (2023-2024)
  - Grade 9: 543
  - Grade 10: 509
  - Grade 11: 463
  - Grade 12: 483
- Student to teacher ratio: 16.04
- Colors: Green and White
- Athletics: Rams (boys), Lady Rams (Girls)
- Athletics conference: PIAA District 3
- Mascot: Ram
- USNWR ranking: 258 in Pennsylvania
- National ranking: 6321
- Yearbook: Centralian
- Communities served: Lower Paxton, West Hanover, Middle Paxton, Dauphin Boro
- Feeder schools: Central Dauphin Middle School, Linglestown Middle School
- Website: Official Website
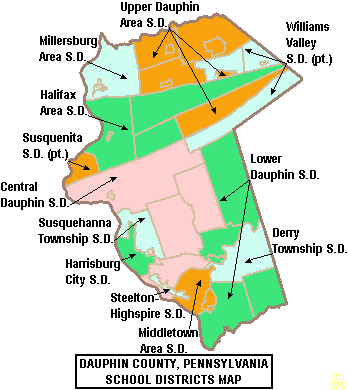

Central Dauphin High School is a public high school located in Harrisburg, Dauphin County, Pennsylvania, it is one of two high schools in the Central Dauphin School District, and the first built in the school district. In the 2017–18 school year, there were 1,707 students at the school.

== History ==
The school, built in 1955, replaced the former Lower Paxton High School. The school was named Central Dauphin High School, for the school district. Central Dauphin School District was created in 1957, and this merger of several school districts was completed by the opening of Central Dauphin High School.

Between 1955 and 1972, renovations and additions were added to the school, including the science wing, a planetarium, and a new cafeteria. In 2003, the planetarium was named for the school's highly inspirational and influential teacher Dennis Phillippy, however was demolished in 2007.

In the late 1990s, overcrowding in the Central Dauphin School District resulted in a proposal to merge Central Dauphin High School with nearby rival Central Dauphin East High School. The proposal was opposed by Central Dauphin High School and was later voted down by the school board (after its removal in the election the week before). In 2000, the school board voted to build a third high school, but in a sudden turnaround by the school board, it was decided that the district would have only two high schools. A new facility was to be built, and it would be named Central Dauphin High School.

In the 2004–05 school year, the high school moved from its Locust Lane, Lower Paxton Township location to its current Piketown Road, West Hanover Township location. The old building was renovated, and it is now being used as Central Dauphin Middle School. In 2004, former President George W. Bush visited the school, making a speech in the auditorium. Since 1955, the yearbook has been called the Centralian. The school newspaper is called the Rampage.

Central Dauphin High School is one of the largest public high schools in south-central Pennsylvania and holds graduation ceremonies at Landis Field located on Locust Lane at the former Central Dauphin High School and current Central Dauphin Middle School in Harrisburg Pennsylvania.

== Extracurriculars ==
Central Dauphin High School offers a wide variety of clubs, activities and an extensive sports program which duplicates the sports offered at Central Dauphin East High School. Efforts to consolidate some sports between the two district high schools have been resisted by parents.

=== Athletics ===
Central Dauphin High School has many varsity and junior varsity teams. The Wrestling team has won four straight team championships from 2007–2011 seasons in AAA. The Boys' Volleyball team won the AAA state championship in 2009. Football has won their first AAAA team state championship as of 2011. Girls' soccer won their first AAA title in 2007 followed by a second in 2008. Boys baseball won the schools first state championship in 1997.

The district funds:

Boys

- Baseball – AAAA
- Basketball – AAAA
- Cross Country – AAA
- Football – AAAAAA
- Golf – AAA
- Indoor Track and Field – AAAA
- Lacrosse – AAAA
- Soccer – AAAA
- Swimming and Diving – AAA
- Tennis – AAA
- Track and Field – AAA
- Volleyball – AAA
- Volleyball – AAA
- Wrestling- AAA

Girls

- Basketball – AAAA
- Cheerleading – AAAA
- Cross Country – AAA
- Indoor Track and Field – AAAA
- Field Hockey – AAA
- Golf – AAA
- Lacrosse – AAAA
- Soccer (Fall) – AAAA
- Softball – AAAA
- Swimming and Diving – AAA
- Girls' Tennis – AAA
- Track and Field – AAA
- Volleyball – AAA

=== Music Program ===
Central Dauphin's music program consists of seven bands, four choirs, and three orchestras. Bands include a freshman ensemble, symphonic, wind, two unselect jazz bands, one select jazz ensemble, and a marching band. The choirs include an all-boys choir, one unselect all-girls choir, a select women’s choir, and a mixed ensemble. The three orchestras are freshman, symphonic, and concert. Each part of the music department holds several concerts throughout the school year, including the annual spring musical, and seasonal concerts held in the auditorium.

== Notable alumni ==
- John DiSanto, Pennsylvania State Senator
- Jeremy Linn, Olympic Gold Medalist Swimmer 4 × 100 m Medley Relay, Silver Medalist 100m Breaststroke Atlanta 1996
- Eric Martsolf, television actor
- Daniel C. Miller, former Harrisburg controller
- Jeffrey B. Miller, former vice president of security, Kansas City Chiefs
- Micah Parsons, professional football player, Green Bay Packers
- Marty Reid, former ESPN NASCAR broadcaster
- Rob Teplitz, former Pennsylvania State Senator
- Alyssa Thomas, professional WNBA basketball player, Phoenix Mercury
- Ryan Whiting, 2012 indoor track and field shot put world champion and 2012 track and field Olympic athlete in shot put
- Trey Yingst, Fox News Channel foreign correspondent
