= Peter Wambach =

American politician

Peter C. Wambach

Member of the Pennsylvania House of Representatives from the 103rd district
- In office 1981–1992
- Preceded by: Stephen R. Reed
- Succeeded by: Ron Buxton

Personal details
- Born: May 12, 1946 (age 80) Harrisburg, Pennsylvania, United States
- Party: Democratic

Peter C. Wambach, Jr. (born May 12, 1946) is a former Democratic member of the Pennsylvania House of Representatives.
