= Daniel C. Miller =

American politician and public servant

City of Harrisburg Controller
- In office January 4, 2010 – January 2014
- Preceded by: James J. McCarthy Jr
- Succeeded by: Charles DeBrunner

Member of the Harrisburg City Council
- In office 2005–2009

City Treasurer
- Incumbent
- Assumed office 2016

Personal details
- Born: August 10, 1956 (age 70) Muncy, Pennsylvania
- Party: Democratic
- Education: Harrisburg Area Community College, Elizabethtown College and Pennsylvania State University
- Website: Dan Miller's website

Daniel C. Miller (born August 10, 1956) is an American politician and public servant from Harrisburg, Pennsylvania. He is current Harrisburg City Treasurer, and previously was the Harrisburg City Controller and was a member of the Harrisburg City Council. The latter two positions were elected at large. Miller is Harrisburg's first openly gay city councillor.

== Biography ==
Miller is a long-time resident of Harrisburg and is the founding partner of a successful CPA firm in the city. He is a graduate of Central Dauphin High School and Harrisburg Area Community College. He has earned a BA in accounting from Elizabethtown College and an MBA in finance from the Pennsylvania State University. He has served on the community advisory board of WITF public television, as a volunteer with the Central PA Literacy Council, and a member of the Harrisburg City Business Revolving Loan Committee. He is a founder of the GLBT Business Association in Harrisburg, now known as the Central Pennsylvania Gay and Lesbian Chamber of Commerce.

In 1990 Miller made local headlines for LGBT activism after gay bashings. Following this exposure, he was being fired for being gay in October 1990 by Donald DeMuth, who ran a consulting firm. Years later the firing was upheld in court, making Miller a poster child for gay activism in Harrisburg. Miller more recently received open hate by former Mayor Linda D. Thompson while working for the City, as she was reported referring to him as "that homosexual, evil little man," causing staffers to resign.

In 2013, Miller ran for Mayor of Harrisburg, but was defeated in the primary. In January 2025, he announced his bid for the Democratic nomination in the 2025 Harrisburg mayoral election. In the primary, he lost to Wanda Williams by 83 votes, but was written-in by enough Republicans to earn him a nomination in the fall.

== See also ==
- Mayor of Harrisburg, Pennsylvania
- Burton, William (15 June 2020). Out in Central Pennsylvania : The History of an LGBTQ Community. Penn State Press. ISBN 978-0-271-08647-7. OCLC 1256407742.
