= Pennsylvania House of Representatives, District 103 =

American legislative district

Pennsylvania's 103rd State House of Representatives district
Representative
Nate Davidson; D–Harrisburg
- Population (2022): 64,346

The 103rd Pennsylvania House of Representatives District is located in south central Pennsylvania and has been represented by Democrat Nate Davidson since 2025.

== District profile ==
The 103rd district is located in Dauphin County and Cumberland County, including the following areas:

- Camp Hill
- East Pennsboro Township
- Harrisburg (PART)
  - Ward 1 [PART, Precinct 01]
  - Wards 3, 4, 5, 6, 7, 8, 10, 11, 12, 14, 15
  - Ward 9 [PART, Precinct 01]
- Lemoyne
- Wormleysburg

Representative	Party	Years	District home	Note
Prior to 1969, seats were apportioned by county.
George Gekas	Republican	1969 – 1974		Lost re-election
Stephen R. Reed	Democratic	1975 – 1980	Harrisburg	Elected Dauphin County Commissioner
Peter C. Wambach	Democratic	1981 – 1992		
Ronald I. Buxton	Democratic	1992 – 2012	Harrisburg	Retired
Patty Kim	Democratic	2012 – 2025	Harrisburg	Elected to State Senate
Nate Davidson	Democratic	2025 – present	Harrisburg	Incumbent

== Recent election results ==
PA House election, 2022: Pennsylvania House, District 103
Party	Candidate	Votes	%
Democratic	Patty Kim (incumbent)	16,193	65.51
Republican	David Buell	8,527	34.49
Total votes		24,720	100.00
Democratic hold			

PA House election, 2020: Pennsylvania House, District 103
Party	Candidate	Votes	%
Democratic	Patty Kim (incumbent)	Unopposed	
Total votes		22,460	100.00
Democratic hold			

PA House election, 2018: Pennsylvania House, District 103
Party	Candidate	Votes	%
Democratic	Patty Kim (incumbent)	15,422	83.98
Republican	Anthony Thomas Harrell	2,941	16.02
Total votes		18,363	100.00
Democratic hold			

PA House election, 2016: Pennsylvania House, District 103
Party	Candidate	Votes	%
Democratic	Patty Kim (incumbent)	Unopposed	
Total votes		20,846	100.00
Democratic hold			

PA House election, 2014: Pennsylvania House, District 103
Party	Candidate	Votes	%
Democratic	Patty Kim (incumbent)	Unopposed	
Total votes		10,512	100.00
Democratic hold			

PA House election, 2012: Pennsylvania House, District 103
Party	Candidate	Votes	%
Democratic	Patty Kim	Unopposed	
Total votes		19,595	100.00
Democratic hold			

PA House election, 2010: Pennsylvania House, District 103
Party	Candidate	Votes	%
Democratic	Ron Buxton (incumbent)	Unopposed	
Total votes		13,348	100.00
Democratic hold			
