= Palace of Gold =

Palace of Gold may refer to:

- Palace of Gold (album) by Canadian country rock band Blue Rodeo
- Prabhupada's Palace of Gold, in New Vrindaban, near Moundsville, West Virginia
- "Palaces of Gold", a 1968 song by Leon Rosselson

== See also ==
- Golden Palace (disambiguation)
