= Cody Webster =

American football player (born 1991)

No. 91
- Position: Punter

Personal information
- Born: June 1, 1991 (age 35)
- Listed height: 6 ft 1 in (1.85 m)
- Listed weight: 205 lb (93 kg)

Career information
- High school: Harrisburg (PA) Central Dauphin East
- College: Purdue
- NFL draft: 2014: undrafted

Career history
- Pittsburgh Steelers (2014)*; Brooklyn Bolts (2015)
- * Offseason or practice squad member only

Awards and highlights
- Big Ten Punter of the Year (2013); First-team All-Big Ten (2013); Second-team All-Big Ten (2011)

Cody Thomas Webster (born June 1, 1991) is an American former football punter. He played college football for the Purdue Boilermakers, where he holds the single-game average punting yards record and was the Big Ten Punter of the Year in 2013. Webster played for the Brooklyn Bolts of the Fall Experimental Football League (FXFL).

== Early life ==
He started for the varsity football team at Central Dauphin East High School at punter, placekicker, defensive back, quarterback and wide receiver. He was a four-time first team All-Mid Penn Conference punter, and a three-time all-state selection. Webster committed to Purdue on October 4, 2009. Once he committed, he was projected to be the most likely Boilermaker to be a true freshman starter, because starting punter Chris Summers was graduating. He signed his National Letter of Intent with Purdue on February 3, 2010. Upon graduating, he was considered to be the twenty-fifth best placekicker in the national high school class of 2010 by Rivals.com and the thirty-fourth best kicker by ESPN.

College recruiting
Name	Hometown	School	Height	Weight	40^{‡}	Commit date
Cody Webster; K	Harrisburg, Pennsylvania	Central Dauphin East High School	6 ft 2 in (1.88 m)	180 lb (82 kg)	--	Oct 4, 2009
Cody Webster; K	Recruit ratings: Scout: Rivals: (73)					
Overall recruit ranking: Scout: -- (P) Rivals: 25 (K) ESPN: 34 (K)
Note: In many cases, Scout, Rivals, 247Sports, On3, and ESPN may conflict in their listings of height and weight.; In these cases, the average was taken. ESPN grades are on a 100-point scale.; Sources: "Purdue Football Commitment List (24)". Rivals.; "Purdue College Football Recruiting Commits". Scout.; "ESPN". ESPN.; "Scout.com Team Recruiting Rankings". Scout.; "2010 Team Ranking". Rivals.com.

== College career ==
Webster played college football for the Purdue Boilermakers where he majored in agriculture. During the 2010, 2011, 2012 and 2013 seasons he was the Boilermakers first team punter. When Webster kicked a 79-yard punt for the 2010 Purdue team against Northwestern, it was the longest punt of his career. In 2010, although true freshman Webster placed fifth in the conference in overall punting average (43.3 yards/punt). He earned honorable mention All-Big Ten honors during the 2010 and 2012 seasons, while also earning first-team All-Big Ten honors in 2013 and second-team All-Big Ten honors in 2011. Webster lead the Big Ten in punting average as a senior.

He was the 2013 Big Ten Punter of the Year. He was named as Ray Guy Award finalist on November 25, 2013.

== Professional career ==
After going undrafted in the 2014 NFL draft, Webster attended the Pittsburgh Steelers rookie minicamp on a tryout.

In 2015, he signed with the Brooklyn Bolts of the Fall Experimental Football League (FXFL).
