= Mark S. McNaughton =

American politician

Member of the Pennsylvania House of Representatives from the 104th district
- In office January 7, 1997 – November 30, 2006
- Preceded by: Jeff Haste
- Succeeded by: Susan C. Helm

Personal details
- Born: May 7, 1963 (age 63) Harrisburg, Pennsylvania
- Party: Republican
- Education: Elizabethtown College; Widener University School of Law

Mark S. McNaughton (born May 7, 1963) is a former Pennsylvania State Representative in the 104th District, which covers part of Dauphin County.

McNaughton graduated Central Dauphin East High School in 1981. He earned a degree in management and finance from Elizabethtown College in 1985 and a law degree from Widener University Commonwealth Law School in 2003.

McNaughton was first elected to represent the 104th legislative district in the Pennsylvania House of Representatives in 1996. He retired prior to the 2006 election.

== Pennsylvania Gaming Control Board appointment ==
McNaughton was appointed to a spot on the new Pennsylvania Gaming Control Board following the end of his career in the House. The appointment caused controversy because McNaughton had been a staunch opponent of the legalization of slot machines in Pennsylvania. Moreover, McNaughton had failed to list over $15,000 in gambling winnings on his ethics statements while in the House. In response, McNaughton revised those ethics statements and claimed that he had been unaware that gambling winnings must be reported. A Patriot-News editorial accused McNaughton of "cronyism" and called McNaughton, then facing a $145,000 salary for service on the board, a "salary hog."

In January 2007, further controversy erupted surrounding McNaughton's appointment to the gaming board. Al Masland, chief counsel for the Pennsylvania Department of State, wrote in an opinion that the timing of McNaughton's appointment was improper and that McNaughton should not be sworn in as a member of the gaming board. McNaughton had been appointed to the post both before leaving the house—in violation of a section of the state constitution barring lawmakers from being appointed to paid state offices—and he had been appointed before a vacancy on the gaming board had become official. By the middle of January 2007, McNaughton had been removed from the running for a seat on the gaming board.
