= George Gekas =

American politician (1930–2021)

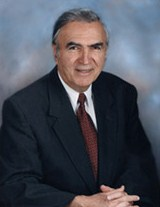

Member of the U.S. House of Representatives from Pennsylvania's 17th district
- In office January 3, 1983 – January 3, 2003
- Preceded by: Allen E. Ertel
- Succeeded by: Tim Holden

Member of the Pennsylvania Senate from the 15th district
- In office January 3, 1977 – December 31, 1982
- Preceded by: William Lentz
- Succeeded by: John Shumaker

Member of the Pennsylvania House of Representatives from the 103rd district
- In office January 7, 1969 – November 30, 1974
- Preceded by: Constituency established
- Succeeded by: Stephen R. Reed

Member of the Pennsylvania House of Representatives from the Dauphin County district
- In office January 2, 1967 – November 30, 1968
- Preceded by: Robert S. Ogilvie
- Succeeded by: Constituency abolished

Personal details
- Born: George William Gekas; April 14, 1930 Harrisburg, Pennsylvania, U.S.
- Died: December 16, 2021 (aged 91) Harrisburg, Pennsylvania, U.S.
- Party: Republican
- Education: Dickinson College (BA); Dickinson Law School (JD)

Military service
- Branch/service: United States Army
- Years of service: 1953–1955

George William Gekas (April 14, 1930 – December 16, 2021) was an American politician from Pennsylvania who served as a Republican member of the U.S. House of Representatives for Pennsylvania's 17th congressional district from 1983 to 2003.

== Early life and education ==
George Gekas was born in Harrisburg, Pennsylvania, the son of Mary (Touloumes) and William Gekas. He graduated from William Penn High School in 1948. He received a B.A. degree from Dickinson College in 1952 and a J.D. degree from Dickinson School of Law in 1958. He was a member of the fraternity Sigma Alpha Epsilon. He served in the United States Army from 1953 to 1955.

== Career ==
He worked in a private law practice for two years and then served as assistant district attorney for Dauphin County from 1960 to 1966.

=== Pennsylvania Legislature ===
In 1966, Gekas was elected to the Pennsylvania House of Representatives for the 103rd district. He won the Republican nomination over the county party organization's preferred candidate, Helen U. Loewen, and incumbent Robert S. Ogilvie. He served in the House until 1974, when he was upset by future Harrisburg mayor Steven Reed in the anti-Watergate Democratic landslide. Gekas served as a member of the Pennsylvania State Senate for the 15th district from 1977 to 1982.

=== United States House of Representatives ===
After the 1980 census, Pennsylvania lost two congressional districts. The Republican-controlled legislature drew a new Harrisburg-based district that Gekas won in 1982, becoming the second Greek-American (after Gus Yatron of the neighboring 6th district) elected to Congress from Pennsylvania. Gekas was reelected nine more times.

He was the only member of the House to vote against the Gun-Free School Zones Act of 1990.

Gekas was one of the House managers in the impeachment trials of Alcee Hastings and President Bill Clinton.

==== 2002 House Campaign ====
In a 2002 PoliticsPA feature story designating politicians with yearbook superlatives, he was named "Missing in Action." Pennsylvania lost two districts after the 2000 census and resulting redistricting. One of the districts that was eliminated was the Reading-based 6th District, represented by five-term moderate-to-conservative Democrat Tim Holden. The legislature split the 6th among three other districts, with the largest slice, including Holden's home in St. Clair, going to Gekas' 17th District.

Holden ran in the 17th, even though it was 65% new to him (a small portion of the even more Republican 9th District had been shifted to the 17th). On election night, Holden defeated Gekas by almost 6,000 votes. Gekas was the only Republican incumbent placed in a district with a Democratic incumbent to be defeated for re-election in 2002.

== Later life and death ==
After his electoral defeat in 2002, Gekas returned to Harrisburg, where he established a law practice. He continued to reside in Harrisburg until his death on December 16, 2021, at the age of 91.

Pennsylvania House of Representatives
Preceded by ???	Member of the Pennsylvania House of Representatives from the Dauphin County district 1967–1968	Constituency abolished
New constituency	Member of the Pennsylvania House of Representatives from the 103rd district 1969–1974	Succeeded by Stephen R. Reed
Pennsylvania State Senate
Preceded by William Lentz	Member of the Pennsylvania Senate from the 15th district 1977–1982	Succeeded by John Shumaker
U.S. House of Representatives
Preceded by Allen E. Ertel	Member of the U.S. House of Representatives from Pennsylvania's 17th congressional district 1983–2003	Succeeded by Tim Holden
