= Jeff Haste =

American politician

Member of the Pennsylvania House of Representatives from the 104th district
- In office 1995–1996
- Preceded by: Jeffrey Piccola
- Succeeded by: Mark S. McNaughton

Personal details
- Party: Republican

Jeff Haste is a former member of the Pennsylvania House of Representatives, representing the 104th legislative district. He was elected on January 30, 1996. Haste also served on the Dauphin County Board of Commissioners from 2002 until 2021. He was named chairman in 2004 and held that title until his retirement on May 26, 2021.

== Controversies ==
Interference into 2.3 million dollar bridge inspection leading to selection of Haste's former employer.

$325,000k kickback from county jail's healthcare provider.
