= John Shumaker =

American politician

John J. Shumaker

Member of the Pennsylvania Senate from the 15th district
- In office April 11, 1983 – August 31, 1995
- Preceded by: George Gekas
- Succeeded by: Jeffrey E. Piccola

Personal details
- Born: March 13, 1929 Harrisburg, Pennsylvania, United States
- Died: October 13, 1999 (aged 70) Lower Paxton Township, Pennsylvania, United States

John J. Shumaker (March 13, 1929 – October 13, 1999) was an American politician from Pennsylvania who served as a Republican member of the Pennsylvania State Senate for the 15th district from 1983 to 1995. He was born in Harrisburg, Pennsylvania. He died on October 13, 1999.

== Legacy ==
In 1988, the Senator John J. Shumaker Public Safety Center was opened just north of the Harrisburg Area Community College Harrisburg campus and named in his honor.
