= Wanda Williams =

American politician (born 1953)

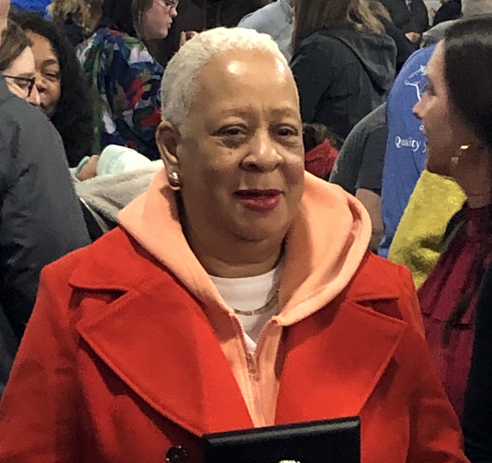
- Williams in 2023

39th Mayor of Harrisburg
- Incumbent
- Assumed office January 3, 2022
- Preceded by: Eric Papenfuse

Personal details
- Born: July 4, 1953 (age 73) Harrisburg, Pennsylvania, U.S.
- Party: Democratic
- Spouse: Jerome Williams
- Education: Harrisburg Area Community College (attended)
- Website: Campaign website

Wanda R. D. Williams (born 1953) is an American Democratic politician from Harrisburg, Pennsylvania, currently serving as 39th Mayor of Harrisburg. Running as a Democrat and President of the Harrisburg City Council, she won the 2021 Harrisburg mayoral election, becoming the city's second female and second African-American mayor.

== Early life ==
Williams grew up in Harrisburg and attended Harrisburg High School and Harrisburg Area Community College.

== Politics ==
=== 1998 School board ===
Williams started her political career in 1998 as a member of the Harrisburg school board.

=== 2006 City Council ===
Williams served on the Harrisburg City Council since 2006, with her last two terms serving as the council president. During her time in the City Council, she worked to set term limits for Harrisburg mayors. In 2016 she received criticism as she was accused of politicizing the Harrisburg Environmental Advisory Council.

=== 2021 Mayoral race ===
Although she had originally planned to run again for city council, Williams announced her candidacy for mayor of Harrisburg in March 2021, running on a platform of infrastructure improvements, affordable housing, and revitalization. She won the Democratic primary for the 2021 Harrisburg mayoral election in an upset with 28.95% of the vote, leading incumbent mayor Eric Papenfuse's 27.93% by only 56 votes, to become the Democratic nominee. She was seen as the heavy favorite to win in the general election, as the winner of the Harrisburg Democratic primary has gone on to win the mayorship since 1977. She faced a single Republican candidate who faced criminal charges of child abuse. However, on September 15, Eric Papenfuse announced that he would run a write-in campaign in the November General Election. Despite this, Williams won the general election by more than a 2–1 margin. Williams became the city's second Black and second female mayor. On July 31, 2022 Williams transferred mayoral powers to Police Commissioner Thomas Carter due to a medical procedure; Carter served as acting mayor until August 16, 2022.

=== 2025 Mayoral race ===
In October 2024, Williams announced a run for re-election in the 2025 Harrisburg mayoral election. On May 20, 2025 she won the Democratic Primary in a five-way race. City Treasurer Dan Miller ran as a Democrat and fell 83 votes short of Williams. Miller won the Republican nomination after receiving 112 write-in votes.

During the general election, Williams refused to debate Miller, saying, "I am not engaging in any debates or lengthy election discussions. I have much more pressing issues to tackle that directly affect the residents of this City. Dan Miller has nothing new to say; therefore, I see no need to give him the platform to regurgitate more of the same. He is talking and will continue to talk. He is good at talk- let him."

Williams won reelection in November with 56% of the vote to Miller's 43%. On election night, she was asked by a reporter if she would be able to work with Miller, who remains treasurer of Harrisburg. She replied, "We'll see because guess what, I'm the big cheese in charge. I'm the executive chief of the city of Harrisburg."

Williams was sworn in for a second term on January 5, 2026. She stated her priorities for the next four years include a renewed focus on infrastructure, fiscal responsibility, public safety, and housing stability.

=== Controversies ===
Williams is the subject of a federal lawsuit filed against her by a former city employee who alleged that his sudden July 2022 termination was retaliation against refusing to promote unqualified individuals with personal ties to Williams. The lawsuit claims retaliation for his ethical concerns. City taxpayers paid over $20,000 in legal fees for Williams from late 2022 to February 2024.

In October 2024, Williams agreed to pay $912.70 to the city of Harrisburg after a state ethics commission found she had improperly used city dumpsters outside her home to dispose of her personal trash. The ethics commission found Williams requested city employees to haul city-owned dumpsters to and from her private residence at least three times around the same time she moved to a new home in 2022. Under city law, Harrisburg residents must pay $230 to use a dumpster for 10 days and $214.25 per ton of waste in dumping fees. The waste from Williams' property cost $1,491.18. Williams paid neither the upfront fee nor the dumping fee.

The fine was to be paid within 30 days of September 22, 2025. As of December 11, 2025, Williams had not paid the fine. Documents released by the city showed taxpayers had spent $31,864 on Williams' legal bills for the matter.

== Personal life ==
Williams lost a granddaughter to gun violence in 2013 as a bystander at a shooting. Eighteen-year-old Tiana Dockens was the daughter of Wanda's son, Dion Lamar Dockens. She was struck by a stray bullet while standing on a porch.Michael Gelsinger, a 24-year-old resident of Shippensburg and his brother, 23-year-old Joseph Payne-Casiano of Harrisburg, were charged with first-degree murder. Gelsinger fired the fatal shot in an exchange of gunfire with another man. Payne-Casiano was driving the vehicle. Gelsinger was found guilty in December 2014 and sentenced to life in prison. Payne-Casiano was acquitted.

Political offices
Preceded by Eric Papenfuse	Mayor of Harrisburg; 2022–present	Incumbent
