= Jeffrey Piccola =

American politician

Jeffrey E. Piccola
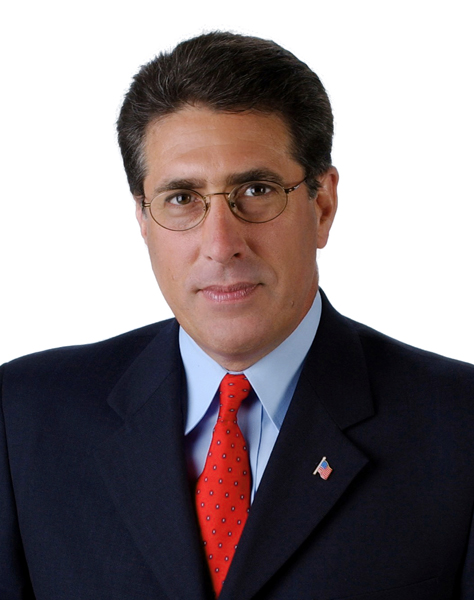

Member of the Pennsylvania State Senate from the 15th district
- In office November 21, 1995 – November 30, 2012
- Preceded by: John Shumaker
- Succeeded by: Rob Teplitz

Republican Whip of the Pennsylvania Senate
- In office January 2, 2001 – November 30, 2006
- Preceded by: David Brightbill
- Succeeded by: Jane Orie

Member of the Pennsylvania House of Representatives from the 104th district
- In office January 4, 1977 – November 7, 1995
- Preceded by: Joseph Hepford
- Succeeded by: Jeff Haste

Personal details
- Born: May 16, 1948 (age 78) Harrisburg, Pennsylvania
- Party: Republican
- Spouse: Denise Piccola
- Children: 2
- Education: Gettysburg College (BA); George Washington University (JD)

Military service
- Allegiance: United States
- Branch/service: United States Air Force
- Years of service: 1973–1974

Jeffrey E. Piccola (born May 16, 1948) is an American politician from Pennsylvania who served as a Republican member of the Pennsylvania State Senate for the 15th District from 1995 to 2012 including as Republican Whip from 2001 to 2006. He also served as a member of the Pennsylvania House of Representatives for the 104th District from 1977 to 1995.

== Early life and education ==
Piccola was born in Harrisburg, Pennsylvania to Anthony J. and Betty Jane Piccola. He graduated from the Susquehanna Township High School in 1966. He received a B.A. degree from Gettysburg College in 1970 and a J.D. degree from George Washington University Law School in 1973. From 1973 to 1974, he served in the United States Air Force and became a first lieutenant. He has worked as an attorney at the Harrisburg law firm of Boswell, Tintner & Piccola since 1973.

== Career ==
Piccola served as a member of the Pennsylvania House of Representatives for the 104th district from 1977 to 1995. He served as a member of the Pennsylvania State Senate for the 15th district from 1995 to 2012. He was made Majority Caucus Administrator of the State Senate in 1999. In 2001, he was elected Senate Majority Whip. He was considered a "[l]eader of the impatient hard right wing of the Pennsylvania Republican Senate."

In 2002, the political website PoliticsPA named him to the list of "Smartest Legislators," saying that he was known for being "[a]rticulate and quick on his feet."

In a 2002 PoliticsPA feature story designating politicians with yearbook superlatives, he was named the "Most Likely to Succeed."

In 2005, Piccola announced that he would run for governor, seeking the Republican nomination against incumbent Democratic governor Ed Rendell. Piccola dropped out of the race for governor in early 2006, after it became clear that former professional football player Lynn Swann had earned the support of most of the Pennsylvania Republican Party.

Following the 2006 elections, Piccola gave up his position as Senate Whip, and instead made a bid to become president pro tempore of the State Senate, after the sitting president pro tempore, Bob Jubelirer, lost the Republican primary in his home district. State Senate Republicans ultimately chose Senator Joe Scarnati for the president pro tempore position instead of Piccola. Piccola was replaced as Republican Whip by Jane Orie.

Piccola considered running for a spot on the State Supreme Court in 2007 but withdrew after he was unable to secure support for the state committee endorsement. In 2009, the Pennsylvania Report noted that Piccola had been "left for dead" after the 2006 leadership election, but was able to return to a leadership role as Chairman of the Senate Education Committee.

In 2012, he received a public reprimand from the Disciplinary Board of the State Supreme Court due to his conduct as a private attorney. He was reprimanded for violations to the code of conduct for lawyers by representing a Utah-based "heir-hunting" firm while also representing three clients involved in estate settlements. The public reprimand was the result of an agreement that allowed Piccola to keep his lawyer license and the dismissal of more serious charges of fraud, dishonesty and champery.

Piccola did not seek re-election in 2012, and was succeeded by Democrat Rob Teplitz.

Piccola became the chairman of the York County Republican Committee until 2022 when two career politicians, Stan Saylor, a Pennsylvanian House Representative for 29 years, and Keith J. Gillespie, another Representative for 19 years, were defeated by anti-establishment candidates, Wendy Fink and Joe D'Orsie, respectively, in their primary. During the contentious primary, Piccola motioned to censure Mike Jones after he endorsed both Fink and D'Orsie. The motion to censure would be defeated. Following the defeats of Saylor and Gillespie, Piccola resigned as chairman.

Pennsylvania House of Representatives
Preceded by Joseph Hepford	Member of the Pennsylvania House of Representatives from the 104th district 1977–1995	Succeeded by Jeff Haste
Pennsylvania State Senate
Preceded by John Shumaker	Member of the Pennsylvania State Senate from the 15th district 1995–2012	Succeeded by Rob Teplitz
Party political offices
Preceded by David Brightbill	Republican Whip of the Pennsylvania Senate; 2001–2006	Succeeded by Jane Orie
