= Mercedes Evans =

American public servant

Mercedes Evans is an American public servant. She currently serves on the Camp Hill Borough Council in Camp Hill, Pennsylvania.

== Early life and education ==
Evans graduated from the University of San Diego with a Bachelor's in Spanish Language and a minor in political science.

== Career ==
Evans was first elected to the Camp Hill Borough Council in 2021.

In 2023, Evans announced her candidacy for the 103rd District of the Pennsylvania House of Representatives. Her campaign was endorsed by Run for Something. She lost the primary to Nate Davidson on April 23, 2024.

In 2025, Evans ran for Mayor of Camp Hill. She lost to Mark Simpson in the general election on November 4, 2025.
