= Pennsylvania House of Representatives, District 104 =

American legislative district

Pennsylvania's 104th State House of Representatives district
Representative
Dave Madsen; D–Harrisburg
- Demographics: 82.5% White; 11.7% Black; 3.8% Hispanic
- Population (2011) • Citizens of voting age: 63,598; 50,320

The 104th Pennsylvania House of Representatives District is located in South Central Pennsylvania and has been represented since 2023 by Dave Madsen.

== District profile ==
The 104th Pennsylvania House of Representatives District is located in southern Dauphin County, including the following areas:

- Dauphin County
  - Harrisburg (PART)
    - Ward 1 (PART, Precincts 02 and 03)
    - Ward 2, 13
    - Ward 9 (PART, Precincts 02, 03, 04, and 05)
  - Lower Swatara Township (PART)
    - Precinct 03
  - Swatara Township
  - Highspire
  - Paxtang
  - Steelton

== Representatives ==
Representative	Party	Hometown	Term	Electoral history
Prior to 1969, seats were apportioned by county.
H. Joseph Hepford	Republican		1969–1976	
Jeffrey Piccola	Republican	Susquehanna Township	1977–1995	Resigned seat on Nov. 7, 1995, after election to Pennsylvania State Senate
Jeff Haste	Republican		1996	Won special election on Jan. 30, 1996
Mark S. McNaughton	Republican		1996–2006	
2000 United States census: 2002 – 2013 Part of Dauphin County Townships of Halifax, Jackson, Jefferson, Lykens, Middle Paxton, Mifflin, Reed, Rush, Susquehanna, Swatara (PART, District 04), Upper Paxton, Washington, Wayne, Wiconisco, Williams Boroughs of Berrysburg, Dauphin, Elizabethville, Gratz, Halifax, Lykens, Millersburg, Paxtang, Penbrook, Pillow, Williamstown Total population: 60,429
Mark S. McNaughton	Republican		1996–2006	Retained seat after redistricting; Did not seek re-election in 2006
Sue Helm	Republican	Susquehanna Township	2006 – 2023	Incumbent
2010 United States census: 2014 – 2022 Part of Dauphin County Townships of East Hanover, Halifax, Jackson, Jefferson, Middle Paxton, Reed, Rush, Susquehanna, Swatara (PART, District 04 and 07), Upper Paxton, Wayne Boroughs of Dauphin, Halifax, Millersburg, Penbrook Part of Lebanon County Townships of East Hanover, North Annville Total population: 63,598
Sue Helm	Republican	Susquehanna Township	2006 – 2023	
Dave Madsen	Democrat	Harrisburg	2023 – present	Incumbent

== Recent election results ==
PA House election, 2022: Pennsylvania House, District 104
Party	Candidate	Votes	%
Democratic	David Madsen	11,718	70.70
Keystone	David Kocur	4,857	29.30
Total votes		16,575	100.00
Democratic gain from Republican			

PA House election, 2020: Pennsylvania House, District 104
Party	Candidate	Votes	%
Republican	Sue Helm (incumbent)	20,735	55.88
Democratic	Patricia Smith	16,371	44.12
Total votes		37,106	100.00
Republican hold			

PA House election, 2018: Pennsylvania House, District 104
Party	Candidate	Votes	%	±%
Republican	Sue Helm	15,385	54.48	
Democratic	Patricia (Patty) Smith	12,856	45.52	
Margin of victory		2,529	8.96	▼2.39
Turnout		28,241	100	

PA House election, 2016: Pennsylvania House, District 104
Party	Candidate	Votes	%	±%
Republican	Sue Helm	16,921	55.69	
Democratic	Jody Rebarchak	13,461	44.31	
Margin of victory		3,460	11.38	▲2.88
Turnout		30,382	100	

PA House election, 2014: Pennsylvania House, District 104
Party	Candidate	Votes	%	±%
Republican	Sue Helm	10,920	54.25	
Democratic	Gene Stilp	9,209	45.75	
Margin of victory		1,711	8.50	▼0.52
Turnout		20,129	100	

PA House election, 2012: Pennsylvania House, District 104
Party	Candidate	Votes	%	±%
Republican	Sue Helm	16,047	54.51	
Democratic	Christopher Dietz	13,393	45.49	
Margin of victory		2,654	9.02	▲7.66
Turnout		29,440	100	

PA House election, 2010: Pennsylvania House, District 104
Party	Candidate	Votes	%	±%
Republican	Sue Helm	11,593	50.68	
Democratic	Gene Stilp	11,280	49.32	
Margin of victory		313	1.36	
Turnout		22,873	100	
