= Golden Palace =

Golden Palace can refer to:

- The Golden Palace, a TV sitcom spin-off of The Golden Girls
- GoldenPalace.com, an Internet-based casino known for paying boxers to get tattoos of their website on their bodies
- Domus Aurea (Latin for "Golden House"), a large palace built by the Roman emperor Nero
- Golden Palace Hotel, in Tsaghkadzor, Armenia
- Radisson Blu Hotel, Yerevan, previously named Golden Palace Yerevan, in Armenia
- Pauwels Sauzen–Vastgoedservice, a cycling team known as Vastgoedservice–Golden Palace in 2014-2015

== See also ==
- Palace of Gold (disambiguation)
- Golden House (disambiguation)
