= Stephen R. Reed =

American politician (1949–2020)

Mayor of Harrisburg
- In office January 5, 1982 – January 4, 2010
- Preceded by: Paul E. Doutrich Jr.
- Succeeded by: Linda D. Thompson

Member of the Pennsylvania House of Representatives from the 103rd district
- In office January 7, 1975 – November 19, 1980
- Preceded by: George Gekas
- Succeeded by: Peter C. Wambach

Personal details
- Born: Stephen Russell Reed; August 9, 1949 Chambersburg, Pennsylvania, U.S.
- Died: January 25, 2020 (aged 70) Harrisburg, Pennsylvania, U.S.
- Party: Democratic
- Education: Dickinson College

Stephen Russell Reed (August 9, 1949 – January 25, 2020) was the longest-serving mayor of Harrisburg, Pennsylvania. Dubbed "Mayor-for-life," he was re-elected to seven four-year terms, serving from 1982 to 2010.

After leaving office, Reed faced charges on nearly 500 counts of theft, fraud, and corruption. He pleaded guilty to 20 charges.

== Biography ==
Reed was born in Chambersburg, Pennsylvania.

After moving to Harrisburg in the 1950s, he attended Bishop McDevitt High School, where he graduated in 1967. He attended Dickinson College, and was named a Finnegan Fellow in 1970. He did not graduate from Dickinson, and later served as an emergency medical technician in Harrisburg, while pursuing his early political career.

Reed was openly gay.

=== Political life ===
Active in the Democratic Party as a teenager, Reed headed the Teenage Democrats of Pennsylvania, was vice president of the College Young Democrats of Pennsylvania, and was active in many civic activities. Among his early work experiences was a staff job for the Democratic Caucus in the Pennsylvania House of Representatives.

In the Democratic landslide victory year of 1974, when he was 25, Reed campaigned hard for the Pennsylvania House of Representatives, and upset four-term Republican incumbent George Gekas, who later became a Pennsylvania state senator and U.S. congressman. Reed went on to serve three terms as a member of the state's House of Representatives until 1980.

=== As mayor ===
Re-elected to the state house in 1976 and 1978, Reed was elected Dauphin County, Pennsylvania commissioner in 1979 and mayor of Harrisburg in 1981. He won re-election as mayor in 1985, 1989, 1993, 1997, 2001 and 2005. During the 2000s, he was considered "Pennsylvania's most popular and successful mayor."

During Reed's tenure, restaurants, museums, hotels, several large office buildings and new residences were constructed within the city limits. He was instrumental in the city getting its minor league baseball team, the Harrisburg Senators, and later led the city to purchase the team when it was sold to a buyer who intended to move it out of the region.

Harrisburg is also known worldwide for its use of land value taxation. Harrisburg has taxed land at a rate six times that on improvements since 1975. This policy was credited by Reed, as well as by the city's former city manager during the 1980s, with helping reducing the number of vacant structures in downtown Harrisburg from about 4,200 in 1982, to less than 500.

Reed is credited with conceiving and developing Harrisburg's City Island park, the Harrisburg University of Science and Technology, and the high school that accompanied it. He was the founder and driving force behind the construction of the $32 million National Civil War Museum in the city.

In 2000, the Commonwealth of Pennsylvania placed Reed in charge of the failing Harrisburg School District, for which he imposed a massive reform and rehabilitation project. In 2006, he was credited and recognized by the Federal Emergency Management Agency for reducing the city's flood risks.

Reed's successes were balanced by setbacks: population loss, mounting debt, and continued poverty remained challenges as Harrisburg's slow recovery continued. Those setbacks notwithstanding, in December 2006 the City Mayors organization recognized Reed's achievements by awarding him the bronze third place in its annual World Mayor competition.

Reed continued to bear strong criticism for purchases of historical Civil War and "American Old West" artifacts with public funds. The artifact purchases were intended for use in a planned Old West Museum, part of a larger plan by Reed to develop a "critical mass" of national and historically focused museums in Harrisburg, centered on the National Civil War Museum. Plans for the Old West Museum met strong public opposition, and Reed placed the plans on hold, commissioning a public study (funded by an auction of some of the artifacts) to review the feasibility of the museum.

He faced similar criticism when acquiring artifacts for the National Civil War Museum. Opponents and critics were most critical of the methods Reed used to fund the purchases without public oversight. The Washington Times stated, "Every time the independent Harrisburg Authority floats bonds for the Harrisburg school district and other government agencies, it collects a fee and deposits it into an account. The mayor can draw on that account for any capital expense as long as he has the signatures of two members of the authority (all appointed by the mayor)."

Reed won reelection in 2005, unopposed, after winning the Democratic primary against Jason N. Smith, a Harrisburg entrepreneur and outspoken critic of the Old West Museum and artifact purchases.

As late as January 2009, Reed was called "Mayor-for-life." In the May 2009 Democratic primary, he lost his re-election bid to Harrisburg City Council president Linda D. Thompson.

=== Corruption indictment and conviction ===
On July 14, 2015, Kathleen Kane, the attorney general of Pennsylvania, announced 499 criminal charges against Reed for his activities involving the museums and the incinerator project. "This is one of the most disturbing cases of public corruption this office has investigated", Kane said. "Mayor Reed used taxpayer money to further his own interests. His conduct is at the root of the fiscal issues that continue to plague the city of Harrisburg today."

Reed was charged with diverting money from Harrisburg bond funds, including buying Wild West and Civil War memorabilia, some of which he kept in a private collection at his home, or sold for his own benefit. Noting his long tenure in office, Kane said that as his mayoral terms passed, Reed had come to disregard legal restraints on expenditures.

In response, Reed said, "I devoted my life to the city of Harrisburg, and I look forward to waging a vigorous fight against these charges. There is much more to this story. It'll come out eventually. Just not today." He later said he had accidentally packed the items among his own when he left office.

The court dismissed 305 of the criminal charges for being beyond the statute of limitations. Reed pleaded guilty to 20 of the remaining felony and misdemeanor counts of receiving stolen property. He was given no jail time, instead sentenced to two years' probation and a fine.

== See also ==
- List of mayors of Harrisburg
- List of longest-serving United States mayors
