= Morris L. Radoff =

American archivist

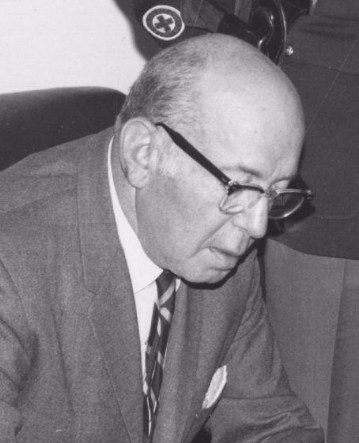
- Close-up from photograph of Morris Radoff viewing the Treaty of Paris, 1970.
- Born: Morris Leon Radoff; January 10, 1905; Houston, Texas
- Died: December 2, 1978 (aged 73); Annapolis, Maryland
- Occupation: Maryland State Archivist

Morris Leon Radoff (January 10, 1905 – December 2, 1978) was the second state archivist of Maryland, serving from 1939 to 1975.

== Biography ==
Morris Radoff was born and raised in a Jewish home in Houston, Texas, and completed his undergraduate studies at the University of Houston. He earned a master's degree at North Carolina University and a Ph.D. in Romance languages and literature at Johns Hopkins University in Baltimore, Maryland.

After receiving his doctorate, Radoff worked as a university lecturer and historical editor in Maryland before being appointed state archivist in 1939. In 1953, Radoff was also appointed the state records administrator, an office he held until his retirement from the Archives in 1975.

Radoff's contributions to the archives profession also included service as president of the Society of American Archivists (SAA), serving from 1954 to 1955.
