= Baltimore City Archives =

Municipal archive of the City of Baltimore, Maryland, US

Coordinates: 39°19′11″N 76°36′28″W

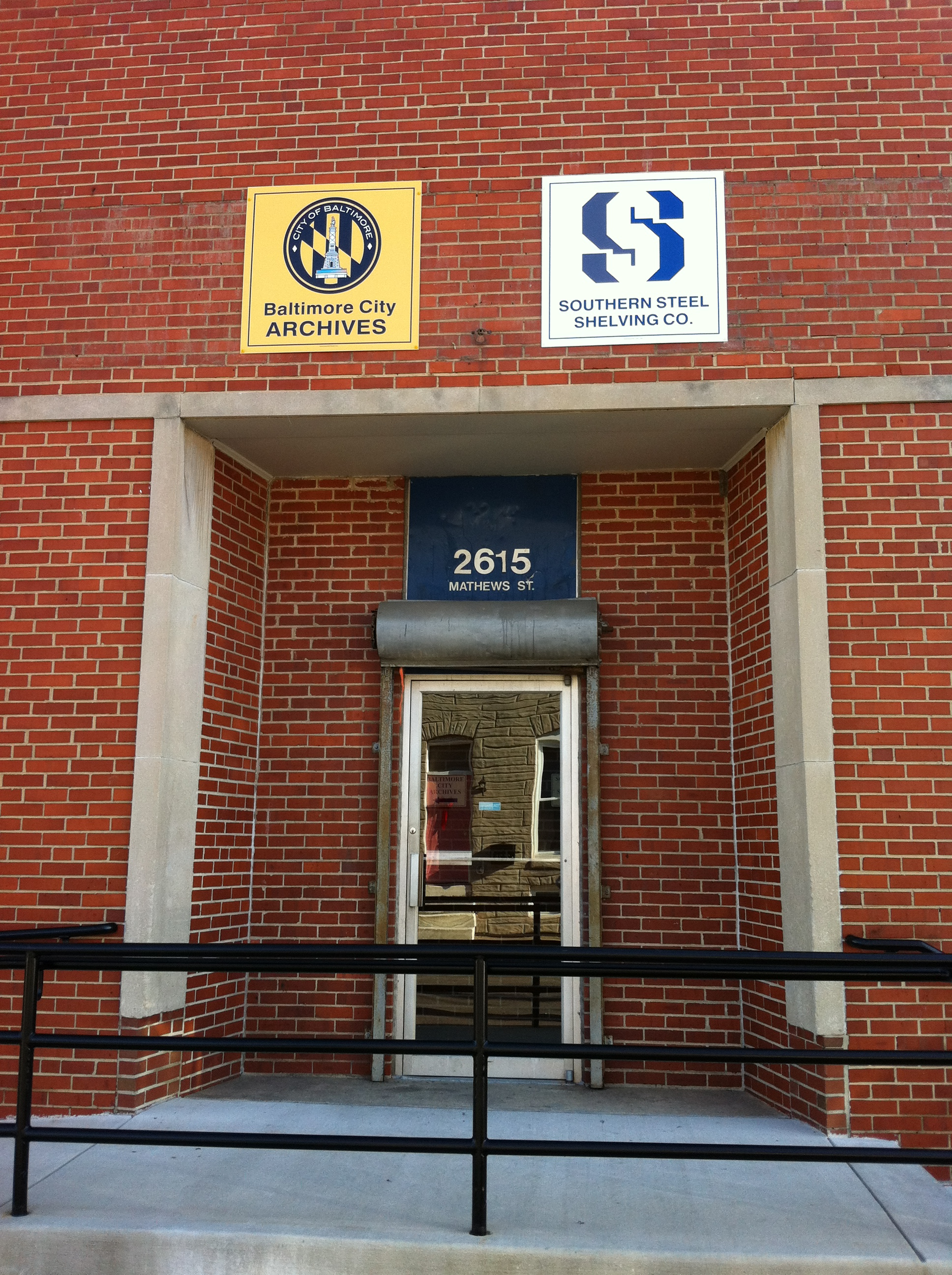
Baltimore City Archives

The Baltimore City Archives is the official municipal archive of Baltimore, Maryland. The archive is located on Mathews Street in the Waverly neighborhood of Baltimore. The Baltimore City Archives "is the central depository for government records of permanent value."

== History ==
Before the incorporating charter of Baltimore stipulated the care of records in 1796, the clerk of Baltimore's Special Commissioners had been ordered to keep records of the town in a chest for safekeeping. The first Record Office of Baltimore was completed in 1839, built to house the growing number of municipal records needing safekeeping. In 1839, the city librarian's office was created, and the librarians and assistants that followed worked to create order out of the multiplying records.

=== 20th century ===
Arguments of cronyism in the city librarian's office resulted in the creation of the Bureau of Archives within the Department of Legislative Reference in 1927.

During the late 1930s, the Works Progress Administration (WPA) assigned workers from the Historical Records Survey (HRS) to the Baltimore City Archives, the outcome being twelve hundred detailed worksheets and a completed index of the records of the Archives. Despite this work, the archives fell into disrepair until the 1970s, when a renewed interest in Baltimore's history was the impetus for the creation of the position of City Archivist. After several years of work, which resulted in a guide to the holdings of the Archive in relation to the WPA-HRS index, the archives again fell into disrepair, housed in a substandard building with environmental.

=== 21st century ===
The Baltimore City Archives has been receiving more support from city government, enabling it to move to a new location. The Archives came under the auspices of the Maryland State Archives in 2009 through a five-year agreement whereby the State Archives receive additional storage space in exchange for preservation services. They have received an NHPRC Grant, and work has since commenced to create more access to the holdings, including more detailed descriptions in their online guide and the addition of Web 2.0 tools, such as Flickr.

== Holdings ==
The Archives holds collections from city offices such as the Mayor of Baltimore, Baltimore City Council, and the Department of Housing as well as collections of national historic interest such as the War of 1812 papers. Current holdings include the Provident Hospital (Baltimore) and the Baltimore Symphony Orchestra.
