= Central Dauphin East High School =

Location
- 626 Rutherford Rd. Harrisburg, Pennsylvania 17109; 40°17′5.1324″N 76°47′56.6736″W

Information
- Former name: Central Dauphin East Senior High School
- School type: Public high school
- Motto: BeGreat
- Established: 1961
- Locale: Suburban: Large
- Sister school: Central Dauphin High School
- School board: Central Dauphin School Board
- School district: Central Dauphin School District
- NCES District ID: 4205400
- Superintendent: Eric Turman
- CEEB code: 391646
- NCES School ID: 420540001746
- President: Michael Jacobs
- Board Representatives: Mrs. Janelle Bingaman, Mr. Eric Epstein, Mrs. Michelle Hawes, Mrs. Lauren Silvers, Mrs. Jeanne Webster
- Dean: Ms. Brittany Robinson, Mr. Lance Deane
- Head Principal: Dr. Luther Green Jr.
- Freshman Principal: Ms. Sarah Iachini
- Sophomore Principal: Ms. Tamira Howard
- Junior Principal: Mr. Durrell Burns
- Senior Principal: Mr. Andrew Dornes
- Teaching staff: 107.36 (FTE)
- Grades: 9–12
- Enrollment: 1,596 (2023–2024)
- Student to teacher ratio: 14.87
- Schedule type: 9 Period
- Schedule: 2023-24 Schedule
- Colors: Black and White
- Fight song: Hail to the Varsity
- Athletics: Panthers (boys), Lady Panthers (Girls)
- Athletics conference: PIAA District 3, Mid Penn Conference
- Mascot: Panther
- USNWR ranking: 427 in Pennsylvania
- National ranking: 11,032
- Yearbook: Oriens
- Communities served: Swatara Township, Lower Paxton, Paxtang, Penbrook
- Feeder schools: Central Daupin East Middle School, Swatara Middle School
- Website: Official Website
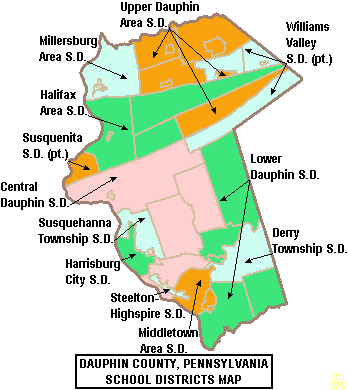

Central Dauphin East High School is a large, suburban, public high school located in Harrisburg, Dauphin County, Pennsylvania. It is one of two high schools operated by the Central Dauphin School District. In the 2022–2023 school year, enrollment was reported as 1,590 pupils in 9th through 12th grades.

== History ==
Central Dauphin East High School opened in 1961. Central Dauphin School District was created in 1954, and this merger of several school districts was completed by the opening of Central Dauphin High School.

In the late 1990s, overcrowding in the Central Dauphin School District resulted in a proposal to merge Central Dauphin East High School with nearby rival Central Dauphin High School. The proposal was opposed by Central Dauphin East High School and was later voted down by the school board (after its removal in the election the week before). In 2000, the school board voted to build a third high school, but in a sudden turnaround by the school board, it was decided that the district would have only two high schools.

Since 1961, the yearbook has been called the Oriens. The school newspaper is called the Panther Print.

Federal School Improvement grant

In 2010, the Central Dauphin School District applied for and was awarded a $2,099,888 grant, by the state and federal government. The money had to be used to transform the high school. The Transformation process specifies that the administration use of rigorous, transparent, and equitable evaluation systems for teachers and principals, high-quality professional development and design and development of curriculum with teacher and principal involvement. The school qualified for the grant due to the chronic low student achievement.

== Music program ==
Central Dauphin East's music program consists of four bands, two choirs, and two orchestras. Bands include the wind ensemble, concert, jazz, and marching band. The choirs include EHS Choraliers and Concert Choir. Each part of the music department holds several concerts throughout the school year, including the annual spring musical, and seasonal concerts held in the auditorium. The arts are supported through the fall play.

== Extracurriculars ==
Central Dauphin East High School offers a variety of extracurricular programs including: clubs, activities and sports.

=== Clubs ===
Central Dauphin East offers a number of clubs. Students can create new clubs with the principal's approval.

- ACLU Club
- Bowling
- CASEF
- Cultural Diversity
- Fall play
- FBLA (Future Business Leaders of America)
- Indoor Guard/Majorettes/Drumline
- Key Club
- Environmental Club
- Latin Club
- Marching Band
- Muslim Student Association Cub
- National Honor Society
- Yearbook Club
- School Store
- The Roaring Panther (Newspaper)
- SADD (Students Against Destructive Decisions)
- Science Olympiad
- Ski Club
- ESL Club
- Step Team
- Student Council
- Environment Club
- Model UN
- Ski Club
- Renaissance Team
- Rugby Team
- TV Studio Club
- Genshiken (The Manga and Anime Club)
- Future Medical Leaders of America (FMLA)

=== Sports ===
The district funds:

Boys

- Baseball - AAAAAA
- Basketball- AAAAAA
- Cross Country - AAA
- Football - AAAAAA
- Golf - AAA
- Lacrosse - AAA
- Soccer - AAAA
- Swimming and Diving - AAA
- Tennis - AAA
- Track and Field - AAA
- Volleyball - AAA
- Wrestling - AAA

Girls

- Basketball - AAAAAA
- Cheerleading - AAA
- Cross Country - AAA
- Field Hockey - AAA
- Golf - AAA
- Lacrosse - AAA
- Soccer (Fall) - AAAA
- Softball - AAAAAA
- Swimming and Diving - AAA
- Girls' Tennis - AAA
- Track and Field - AAA
- Volleyball - AAAA

According to PIAA directory May 2024

== Notable alumni ==
- Cyncir Bowers (Class of 2024) – college football running back for the UConn Huskies
- Chase Edmonds (Class of 2014) - 2014 Jerry Rice Award Winner, 2018 NFL 4th Round Draft Pick by the Arizona Cardinals
- Hyleas Fountain - Olympic Silver Medalist Heptathlon 2008 Beijing
- Jeffrey Gaines (Class of 1984) - American singer-songwriter and guitarist
- Candace Gingrich (Class of 1984) - LGBT rights activist
- Mark S. McNaughton (Class of 1981) - former Pennsylvania state representative
- Dustin Pague (Class of 2006) - current Mixed Martial Artist, formerly fighting in the UFC as a bantamweight
- Michael Payton (Class of 1988) - college football hall of famer
- Stephen C. Sillett - botanist and pioneer in the study of tall trees
- Ciara Renée (Class of 2009) - Broadway actor in Big Fish and Pippin; starred as Kendra Saunders/Hawkgirl in Legends of Tomorrow on The CW
- Cody Webster (Class of 2010) - 2013 Big Ten Conference, Eddleman–Fields Punter of the Year
