= 2013 Harrisburg mayoral election =

- November 5, 2013
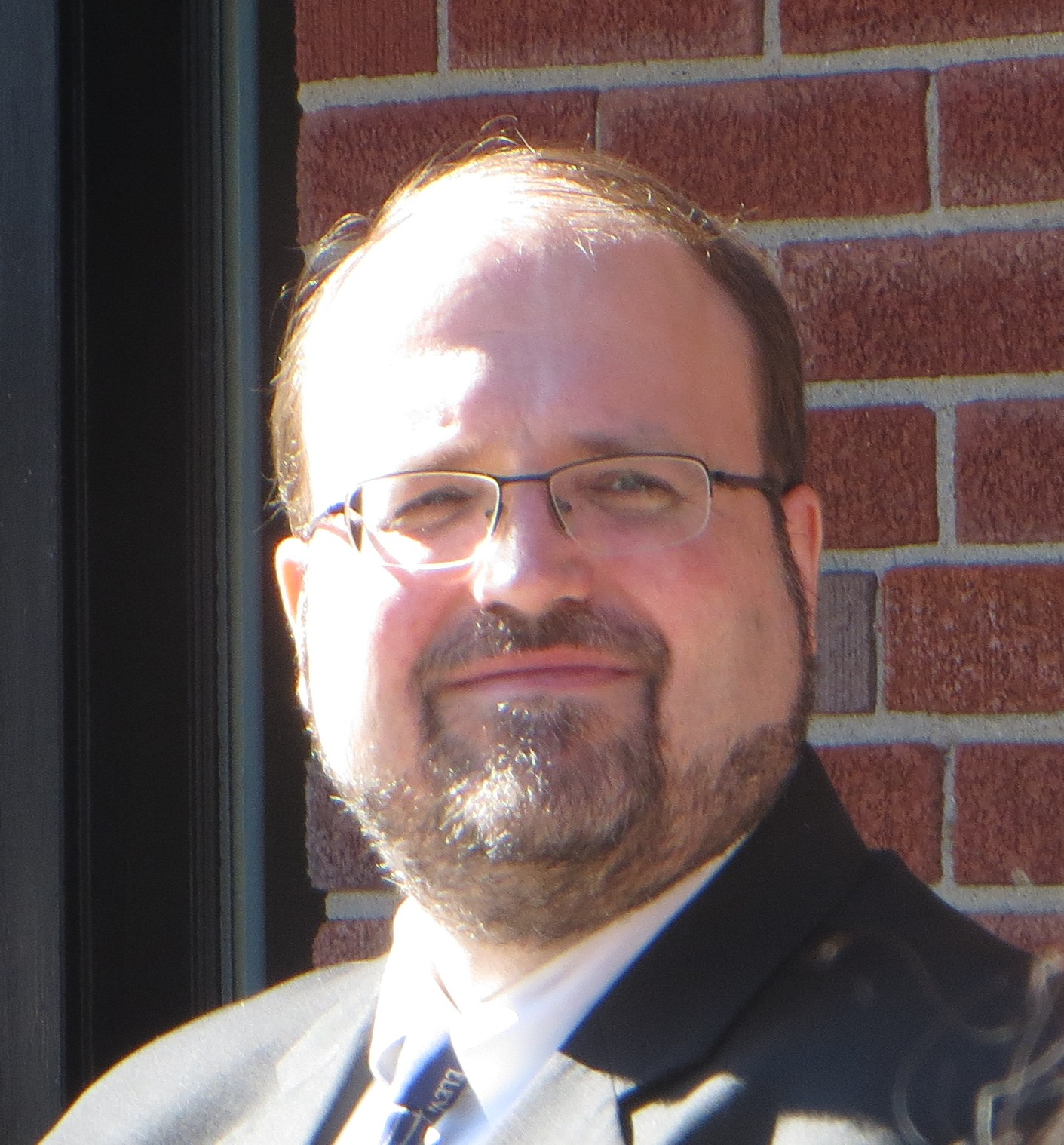

Candidate	Eric Papenfuse	Dan Miller
Party	Democratic	Republican
Popular vote	3,623	2,333
Percentage	49.7%	32%
Mayor before election
Linda D. Thompson
Democratic
Mayor
Eric Papenfuse
Democratic

The 2013 mayoral election in Harrisburg, Pennsylvania was held on November 5, 2013, and resulted in Eric Papenfuse, a local bookstore owner and Democrat, being elected to his first term.

== Background ==
Incumbent first term Democratic mayor Linda D. Thompson was extremely unpopular. In large part due to her calling City Controller Dan Miller, the first openly gay official in Harrisburg, a “homosexual, evil little man” along with other inflammatory rhetoric.

== Campaign ==
Thompson sought re-election but would face challenges in the Democratic Primary in the form of Dan Miller, the aforementioned City Controller, and Eric Papenfuse, a local bookstore owner. Papenfuse would win the nomination but Miller would run for mayor under the Republican ticket as the party failed to field a candidate. Papenfuse would go on to defeat Miller a second time during the general election and become Harrisburg's new mayor.

== Results ==
Mayor of Harrisburg, Democratic primary, 2013
Party	Candidate	Votes	%
Democratic	Eric Papenfuse	2,482	38.44%
Democratic	Dan Miller	2,086	32.31%
Democratic	Linda D. Thompson (incumbent)	1,817	28.14%
Democratic	Lewis Butts	64	0.99%
Democratic	Write-ins	8	0.12%
Total votes		6,457	100.00%

Mayor of Harrisburg, 2013 general election
Party	Candidate	Votes	%
Democratic	Eric Papenfuse	3,623	49.7%
Republican	Dan Miller	2,333	32%
N/A	Write-ins	1,334	18.3%
Total votes		7,290	100.00%
Democratic hold			

== See also ==
- 2013 United States elections
- List of mayors of Harrisburg, Pennsylvania
