= Central Dauphin School District =

School district in Pennsylvania

Coordinates: 40.28420°N 76.80138°W

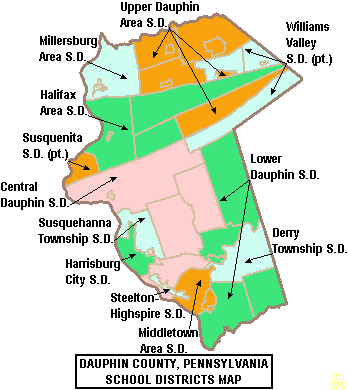
- Central Dauphin School District is shown in pink

Address
- 600 Rutherford Road Harrisburg, Dauphin County, Pennsylvania, 17109; United States

District information
- Type: Public
- Grades: K-12

Other information
- Website: cdschools.org

The Central Dauphin School District is a large, suburban, public school district located in suburban Harrisburg, Pennsylvania, serving students in central and eastern Dauphin County. It is the largest school district in the county, the largest in the greater Harrisburg metropolitan area, and the ninth-largest in the state. The district serves the Boroughs of: Dauphin, Paxtang and Penbrook as well as Lower Paxton Township, Middle Paxton Township, Swatara Township and West Hanover Township. It was created in 1954, combining four smaller districts. The Central Dauphin School District encompasses approximately 118 square miles (310 km^{2}).

== Schools ==
Central Dauphin School District operates two high schools (9th-12th), four middle schools (6th-8th), 13 elementary schools (grades K-5th), and the CD Cyber Academy.

- Central Dauphin High School
- Central Dauphin East High School
- Central Dauphin Middle School
- Central Dauphin East Middle School
- Linglestown Middle School
- Swatara Middle School
- Chambers Hill Elementary School
- E.H. Phillips Elementary School
- Lawnton Elementary School
- Linglestown Elementary School
- Middle Paxton Elementary School
- Mountain View Elementary School
- Northside Elementary School
- Paxtang Elementary School
- Paxtonia Elementary School
- Rutherford Elementary School
- Southside Elementary School
- Tri-Community Elementary School
- West Hanover Elementary School
- CD Cyber Academy
