= Provident Hospital (Baltimore) =

Geography
- Location: Baltimore, Maryland, United States
- Coordinates: 39°19′14″N 76°39′31″W

Organization
- Type: African American Hospital

Services
- Beds: 10

History
- Opened: 1894
- Closed: 1999

Links
- Lists: Hospitals in Maryland

Provident Hospital was a hospital from 1894 to 1999 in northwest Baltimore, Maryland, United States.

The hospital began as a 10-bed clinic in a private residence at 419 Orchard St, in northwest Baltimore, Maryland, in 1894 to provide both medical treatment and training for Black nurses and doctors. The hospital was founded by Negro physicians who were practicing in the Baltimore area just a year after the founding of the first Black-owned and operated hospital, Provident Hospital of Chicago.The founding physicians were J. Marcus Cargill (organizer and Professor of Gynecology, William E. Harris, Dean and Surgeon-in-Chief, Charles Henry Fowler, Professor of Obstetrics, Richard Johnson, William T. Carr, and James O'Neil Creditt staffed this small hospital. Within two years it moved to a larger site at 413 W. Biddle Street. Provident Hospital was one of the first black medical facilities located in Baltimore.

== Background ==
An all-Black medical facility was in need in the late nineteenth and twentieth century due to Afro-Americans not being allowed or having limited access to medical attention by other hospitals in the area. The idea of a black hospital was a place where a Negro physician could mature in his craft and ladies could become nurses through a nursing school. The idea of a black hospital came to mind prior to the American Civil War.

== History ==
After 30 years at the Biddle St. site, the hospital relocated to an even larger site, the former Union Protestant Hospital site at 1514 Division Street (Union Protestant Hospital is now known as Union Memorial Hospital and located in North Baltimore City).

In 1970, the final site for Provident Hospital was opened at 2600 Liberty Heights Avenue. In 1986, Provident Hospital merged with Lutheran Hospital to address financial issues. The combined hospitals closed down in 1986 and a year later reopened as Liberty Medical Center in 1987 due to lack of funding."

In 1996, Liberty Medical Center merged with Bon Secours hospital as a result of continued financial problems, with the Liberty campus closing for good in 1999.

== Historic preservation and commemoration ==
The historical archives of the Provident Hospital were given to the Maryland State Archives in May 2011. The Bon Secours Health System, Inc./Provident Hospital Archives Collection (MSA SC 5971) was placed on long-term deposit at the Baltimore City Archives, 2615 Mathews Street, Baltimore, Maryland 21218. Researchers may access the material at the Baltimore City Archives during its regular business hours. Photographs from the collection have been placed on Flickr.com for viewing, commenting, and identification.

The Bon Secours Health System commemorated the Provident Hospital after its closing with a historical garden and display of memorabilia on the site on the Liberty Hospital campus. The garden, along both Liberty Heights and Towanda Avenue, commemorates not only Provident Hospital, but also Lutheran Hospital (with which Provident merged), and the Liberty Medical Center.

The garden was known as Trinity Gardens and was part of the sale of the Liberty Campus to Baltimore City Community College in 2010. A release from Bon Secours Medical system at the time indicated that BCCC intended to preserve Trinity Gardens.
