= Capital Region Water =

Agency overview
- Formed: 1957
- Preceding agency: Harrisburg Authority
- Type: Municipal Authority
- Jurisdiction: Dauphin County, Pennsylvania
- Headquarters: 212 Locust Street, Suite 500; Harrisburg, Pennsylvania
- Employees: 115
- Website: capitalregionwater.com

Capital Region Water (formerly known as Harrisburg Authority) is a municipal authority providing drinking water, wastewater and stormwater services in Dauphin County, Pennsylvania, United States.
