= The Golden House =

Coordinates: 22.3203°N 114.1891°E

Swisshorn Gold Palace (Chinese: 瑞士號黃金皇宮) aka. "The Golden House" was a showroom of Hang Fung Gold Technology and a tourist attraction in Hong Kong, advertised as a luxury hotel. It was located at G/F No. 71-77 Pau Chung Street, To Kwa Wan, Kowloon.

It was supposedly modelled after ancient European palaces. The structure took five years to design and was built from approximately two tonnes of gold. The inside of the "hotel" was covered in gold from its ceilings, door frame, and even toilet seats. The construction cost about US$38 million to build. It opened on 23 September 2006. It was said to be available for weddings and lodging. One night in the Golden House would have cost about $28,000.

Most of the gold features were melted in 2008.
