= Harrisburg Area Community College =

College in Harrisburg, Pennsylvania, U.S.

Coordinates: 40.291133°N 76.8847°W

- Former name: Harrisburg Area Community College
- Motto: Latin: Scientia Restituo Verum
- Motto in English: Knowledge Restores Truth
- Type: Public community college
- Established: 1964
- Endowment: US$30.2 million
- President: Dan Lufkin
- Administrative staff: 889 full-time, 1,493 part-time
- Undergraduates: 19,000
- Location: Harrisburg, Pennsylvania, United States
- Mascot: Hawks
- Website: www.hacc.edu

HACC, Central Pennsylvania's Community College, (HACC) is a public community college in Harrisburg, Pennsylvania, United States. HACC is accredited by the Middle States Commission on Higher Education. HACC serves 17,000 degree-seeking students, as well as more than 8,300 remedial and workforce development students. The college has more than 100,000 alumni.

== History ==
HACC, Central Pennsylvania's Community College, became the first community college in Pennsylvania on February 14, 1964. In 2005, Harrisburg Area Community College adopted the name HACC, Central Pennsylvania's Community College. While Harrisburg Area Community College remains the college's full legal name, the college registered the legal alias "HACC, Central Pennsylvania's Community College", in 2007 and began using that name almost exclusively.

The HACC faculty voted to form a union in April 2022.

== Campuses ==
The college has five campuses in central Pennsylvania:

- Gettysburg
- Harrisburg
- Lancaster
- Lebanon
- York

== Activities ==
HACC students compete within the Eastern Pennsylvania Collegiate Conference (EPCC) in Region XIX of the National Junior College Athletic Association (NJCAA). The intercollegiate sports are offered at HACC's Harrisburg Campus and are open to all HACC students.

There are multiple student organizations and clubs at each of campus, including Student Government Associations (SGA), honors fraternities, major-related clubs and multicultural clubs.

== Notable alumni ==
- Timothy DeFoor, Auditor General of Pennsylvania
- Shane Gillis, comedian
- Randall R. Marchi, US Army major general
- Daniel C. Miller, Harrisburg City Controller
- Joy Ufema, first Thanatology Nurse in U.S.
- Wanda Williams, 39th Mayor of Harrisburg
