= Harrisburg City Council =

Office of City Council of Harrisburg
- City Seal

Type
- Type: Part-time mayor-council
- Houses: Unicameral

Leadership
- Council President: Danielle Hill, Democratic
- Council Vice President: Lamont Jones

Structure
- Seats: 7
- Political groups: Democratic (7)
- Length of term: 4 Years

Elections
- Next election: 2027

Meeting place
- Rev. Dr. Martin Luther King Jr. City Government Center; 10 N. 2nd St, Harrisburg, PA 17101

Website
- City Website

The Harrisburg City Council is the legislative branch of the city government of Harrisburg, Pennsylvania and consists of seven members elected at-large. The council president is elected by the council members and presides over city council meetings. In the event of illness or absence of the president, the vice president presides over the meetings. Each member's term is four years, serving part-time. There are no limits on the number of terms a member may serve.

== Legislative process ==
Every proposed ordinance is initially in the form of a resolution introduced by a council member. Before a resolution can be enacted, it must be referred by the president of the council to an appropriate standing committee, considered at a public hearing and meeting, reported out by the committee, printed as reported by the committee, distributed to the members of the council, and made available to the public. Passage of a bill requires the favorable vote of a majority of all members. A resolution becomes law upon the approval of the mayor. If the mayor vetoes a bill, the council may override the veto by a two-thirds vote. City Council also confirms all department directors and certain other mayoral appointees.

City Council considers and evaluates legislative concerns consisting of committees on:

- Administration
- Budget and Finance
- Building and Housing
- Community and Economic Development
- Children and Youth
- Parks and Recreation
- Public Safety
- Public Works

== City Council members ==
The City Council members as of January 2026 are:

Name	Took office	Term expires	Party
Danielle Hill†	October 9, 2018	January 2028	Dem
Jocelyn Rawls	January 3, 2022	January 2030	Dem
Crystal Davis	January 2, 2024	January 2028	Dem
Ausha Green	January 2, 2018	January 2030	Dem
Ralph Rodriguez	January 3, 2022	January 2030	Dem
Lamont Jones	January 2, 2024	January 2028	Dem
Rob Lawson	January 5, 2026	January 2030	Dem

Key to Chart
† President of Council

=== Former members ===
Name	Took office	Left office	Party
Gloria Martin-Roberts	2004	2012	Dem
Patty Kim	2004	2012	Dem
Eugenia G. Smith	2006	2014	Dem
Kelly D. Summerford	2010	2014	Dem
Wanda D. Williams†	2006	2022	Dem
Cornelius T. Johnson	2016	2018	Dem
Dave Madsen	2017	2022	Dem

== See also ==
- List of mayors of Harrisburg
