= William Schenck =

William Schenck may refer to:

- A. William Schenck, former Secretary of the Pennsylvania Department of Banking
- William Cortenus Schenck (1773–1821), surveyor, militia general and legislator in Ohio
