= 2022 United States House of Representatives elections in Pennsylvania =

- November 8, 2022

All 17 Pennsylvania seats to the United States House of Representatives
	Majority party	Minority party
Party	Democratic	Republican
Last election	9	9
Seats won	9	8
Seat change	Steady	▼1
Popular vote	2,436,919	2,702,262
Percentage	47.30%	52.45%
Swing	▼2.07%	▲1.82%

Democratic hold Republican hold
Democratic
50–60%
60–70%
70–80%
80–90%
>90%
Republican
50–60%
60–70%
70–80%
80–90%
>90%

The 2022 United States House of Representatives elections in Pennsylvania were held on November 8, 2022, to elect representatives for the 17 seats in Pennsylvania (reduced from 18 in the redistricting cycle following the 2020 United States census).

Pennsylvania's legislature enacted new district maps in January 2022, which were promptly vetoed by Governor Tom Wolf. The state supreme court took control of the process and selected a map in February 2022. After the court rejected several legal challenges in March, the new district boundaries were used in the May 2022 primary elections.

Despite losing the popular vote, with one Democratic and two Republican incumbents running unopposed, Democrats won the majority of seats in the state for the first time since 2008. As a result, Pennsylvania was one of only two states in which the party that won the state's popular vote did not win a majority of seats in 2022, the other state being Nevada.

== District 1 ==
2022 Pennsylvania's 1st congressional district election
- November 8, 2022
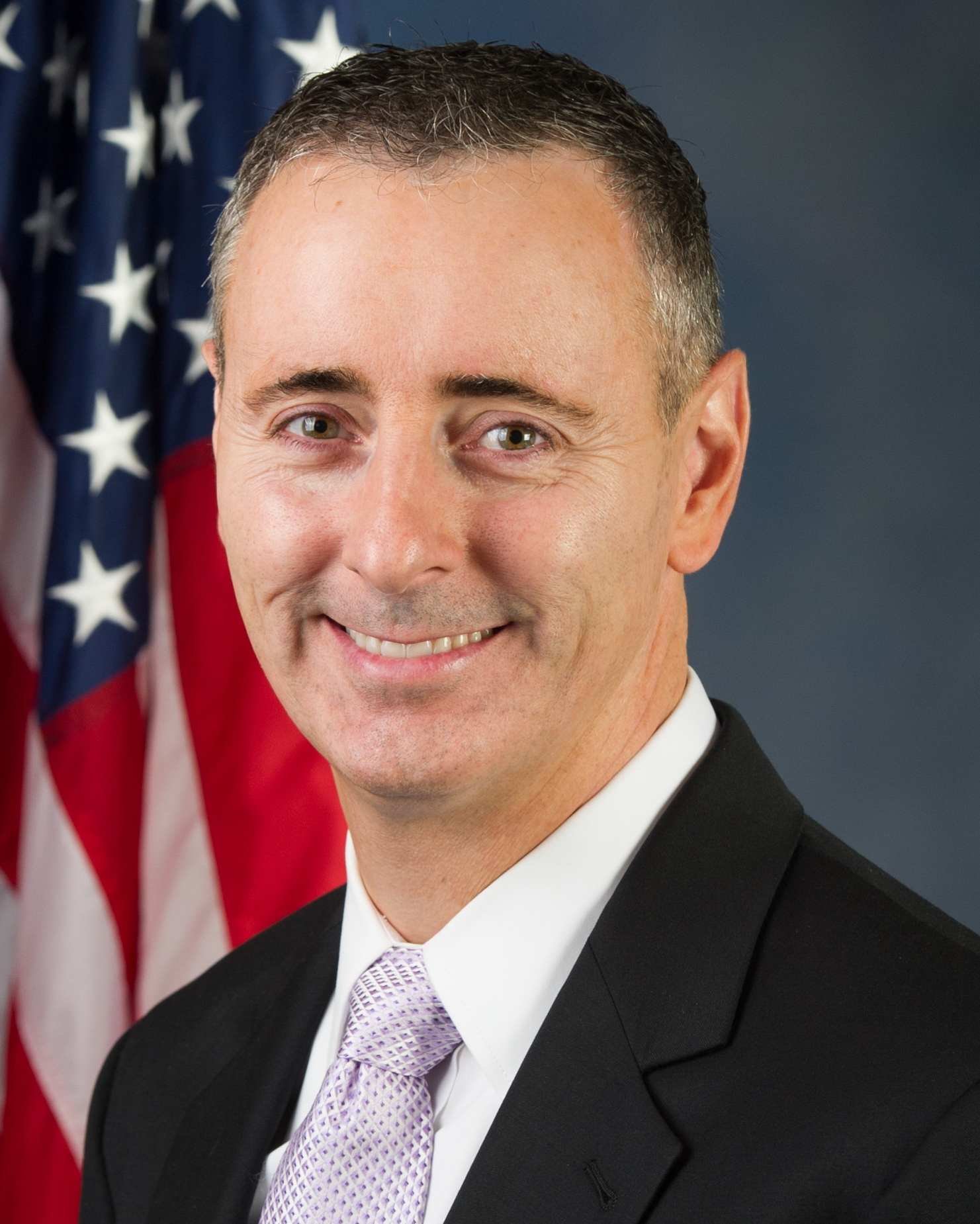

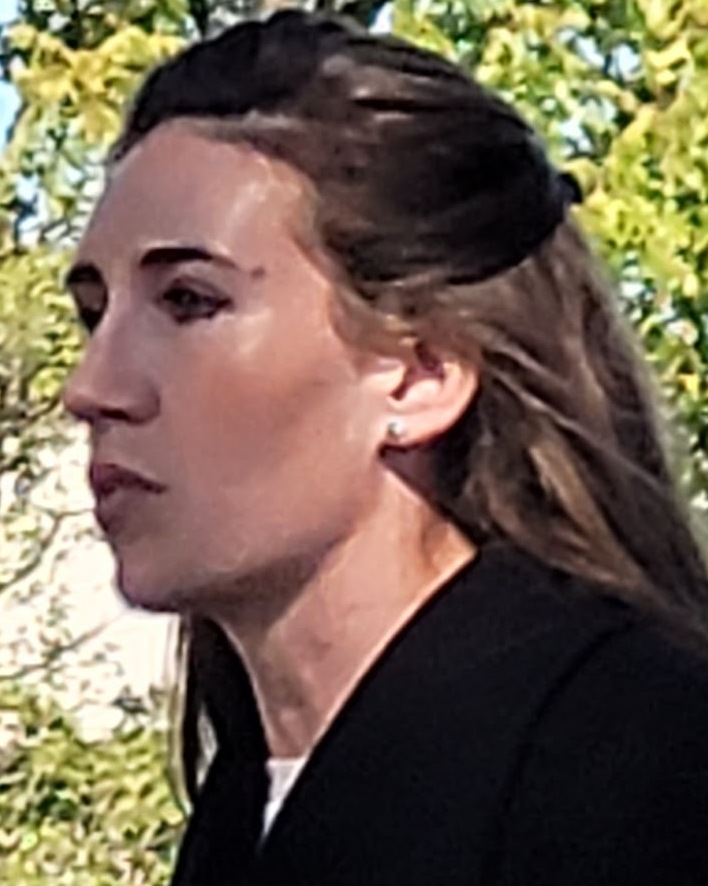
Nominee	Brian Fitzpatrick	Ashley Ehasz
Party	Republican	Democratic
Popular vote	201,571	165,809
Percentage	54.9%	45.1%
- Fitzpatrick: 40–50% 50–60% 60–70% 70–80% Ehasz: 40–50% 50–60% 60–70% Tie: 40–50%
U.S. Representative before election
Brian Fitzpatrick
Republican
Elected U.S. Representative
Brian Fitzpatrick
Republican

The 1st district is based in the northern suburbs of Philadelphia, including all of Bucks County and parts of Montgomery County. The district was mostly unchanged by redistricting. It has an even PVI and voted for Joe Biden by 5 points in 2020. Republican Brian Fitzpatrick, who had represented the district since 2017, was most recently re-elected in 2022 with 54.9% of the vote.

=== Republican primary ===
==== Candidates ====
===== Nominee =====
- Brian Fitzpatrick, incumbent U.S. representative

===== Eliminated in primary =====
- Alex Entin, procurement manager

===== Withdrawn =====
- Caroline Avery, personal antiquities buyer (running as a Libertarian)
- Bradley Lanning, realtor
- Dasha Pruett, photographer and nominee for Pennsylvania's 5th congressional district in 2020

==== Endorsements ====
Brian Fitzpatrick

Organizations

- AIPAC PAC
- Citizens for Responsible Energy Solutions
- Pro-Israel America
- Republican Jewish Coalition PAC
- U.S. Chamber of Commerce

==== Results ====
Republican primary results
Party	Candidate	Votes	%
Republican	Brian Fitzpatrick (incumbent)	60,502	65.57
Republican	Alex Entin	31,772	34.43
Total votes		92,274	100.00

=== Democratic primary ===
==== Candidates ====
===== Nominee =====
- Ashley Ehasz, former U.S. Army pilot

===== Withdrawn =====
- Eric Bruno, former auto mechanic
- Paul Fermo, former U.S. Navy pilot

==== Endorsements ====
Ashley Ehasz

Organizations

- NARAL Pro-Choice America
- Planned Parenthood Action Fund
- VoteVets.org

==== Debate ====
2022 Pennsylvania's 1st congressional district Democratic primary debate
No.	Date	Host	Moderator	Link	Democratic	Democratic
Key: P Participant A Absent N Not invited I Invited W Withdrawn						
Key: P Participant A Absent N Not invited I Invited W Withdrawn					Ashley Ehasz	Paul Fermo
1	Feb. 19, 2022	Bucks County Young Democrats	Jon Panofsky; Dan Wood	YouTube	P	P

==== Results ====
Democratic primary results
Party	Candidate	Votes	%
Democratic	Ashley Ehasz	79,546	100.00
Total votes		79,546	100.00

=== Independent and third-party candidates ===
==== Libertarian Party ====
===== Disqualified =====
- Caroline Avery, personal antiquities buyer (originally ran as a Republican)

==== Endorsements ====
Caroline Avery

Organizations

- Gun Owners of America

==== Green Party ====
===== Withdrawn =====
- Henry Conoly, activist

=== General election ===
==== Predictions ====
Source	Ranking	As of
The Cook Political Report	Solid R	May 26, 2022
Inside Elections	Solid R	August 25, 2022
Sabato's Crystal Ball	Likely R	March 2, 2022
Politico	Likely R	October 3, 2022
RCP	Lean R	June 9, 2022
Fox News	Likely R	August 22, 2022
DDHQ	Solid R	July 20, 2022
538	Solid R	June 30, 2022
The Economist	Likely R	September 28, 2022

==== Post-primary endorsements ====
Brian Fitzpatrick (R)

Organizations

- Giffords
Ashley Ehasz (D)

Organizations

- End Citizens United
- Indivisible
- Jewish Democratic Council of America
- National Organization for Women PAC
- National Women's Political Caucus
- Swing Left

Newspapers

- The Philadelphia Inquirer

==== Polling ====
Poll source	Date(s) administered	Sample size (Note: Key: A – all adults RV – registered voters LV – likely voters V – unclear)	Margin of error	Brian Fitzpatrick (R)	Ashley Ehasz (D)	Other	Undecided
Public Opinion Strategies (R) (Note: Poll sponsored jointly by the National Republican Congressional Committee and Fitzpatrick's campaign committee)	September 5–8, 2022	400 (LV)	± 4.0%	55%	35%	–	10%
RMG Research	July 22–29, 2022	400 (LV)	± 4.9%	42%	35%	10%	13%
Public Policy Polling (D) (Note: Poll sponsored by Ehasz's campaign and analyzed by Global Strategy Group)	June 24–25, 2022	626 (LV)	± 3.9%	45%	38%	–	18%

==== Results ====
2022 Pennsylvania's 1st congressional district election
Party	Candidate	Votes	%
Republican	Brian Fitzpatrick (incumbent)	201,571	54.87
Democratic	Ashley Ehasz	165,809	45.13
Total votes		367,380	100.00
Republican hold			

== District 2 ==
2022 Pennsylvania's 2nd congressional district election
- November 8, 2022
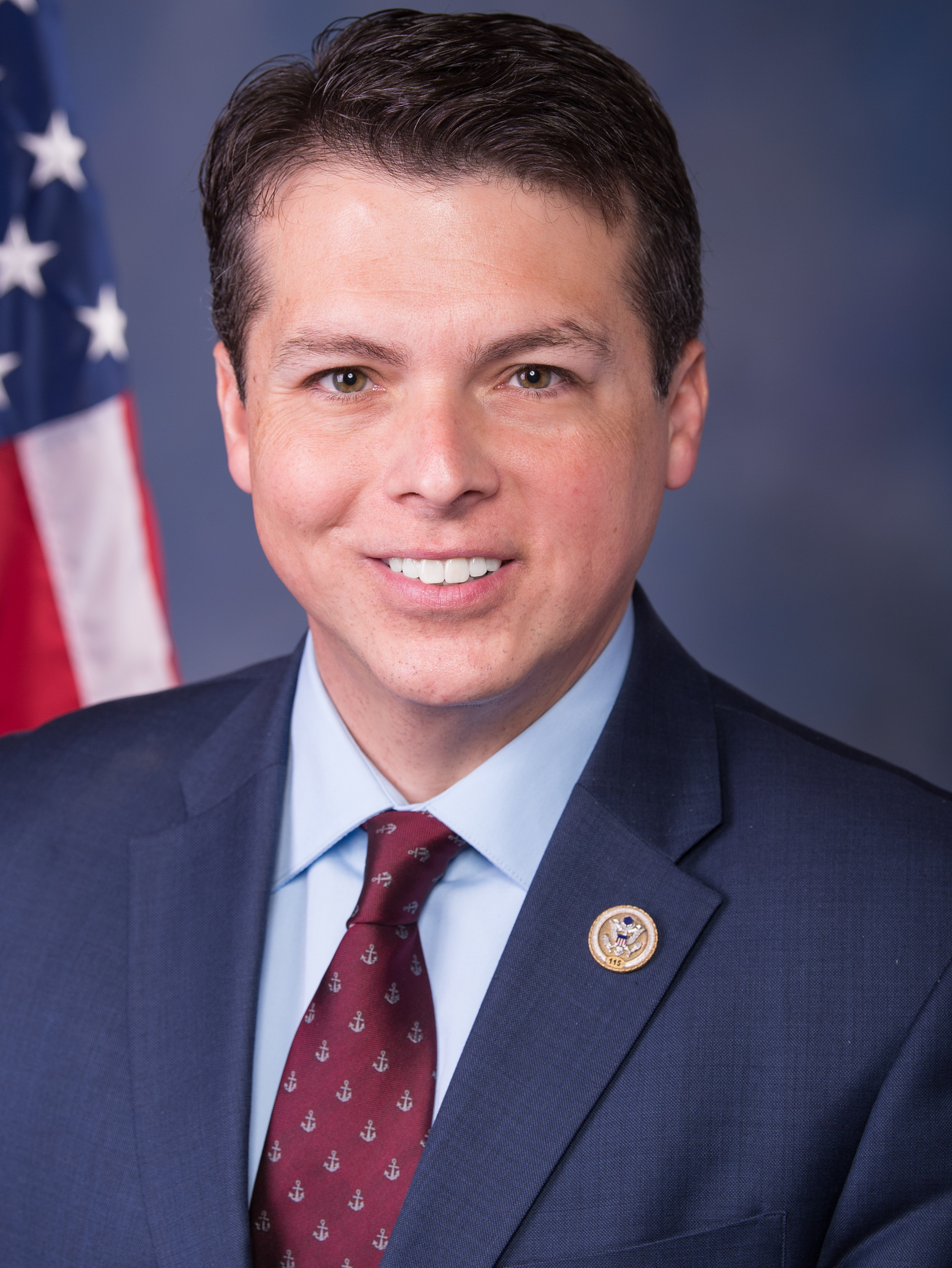

Nominee	Brendan Boyle	Aaron Bashir
Party	Democratic	Republican
Popular vote	141,229	45,454
Percentage	75.7%	24.3%
- County results Boyle: 70–80%
U.S. Representative before election
Brendan Boyle
Democratic
Elected U.S. Representative
Brendan Boyle
Democratic

The 2nd district is based in central and northeastern Philadelphia. The district was mostly unchanged by redistricting. It had a PVI of D+22, and voted for Joe Biden by 43 points in 2020. Democrat Brendan Boyle, who had represented the district since 2019, was most recently re-elected in 2022 with 75.7% of the vote.

=== Democratic primary ===
==== Candidates ====
===== Nominee =====
- Brendan Boyle, incumbent U.S. representative

===== Declined =====
- Sharif Street, state senator from the 3rd district and son of former Philadelphia Mayor John F. Street

==== Endorsements ====
Brendan Boyle

Labor unions

- Health Professionals and Allied Employees

Organizations

- AIPAC PAC
- Congressional Black Caucus PAC
- Planned Parenthood Action Fund
- Sierra Club

==== Polling ====
Hypothetical polling

Poll source	Date(s) administered	Sample size	Margin of error	Brendan Boyle	Sharif Street	Undecided
MuniciPoll (D) (Note: Poll sponsored by Boyle's campaign)	December 4–7, 2021	939 (LV)	± 3.2%	58%	18%	24%

==== Results ====
Democratic primary results
Party	Candidate	Votes	%
Democratic	Brendan Boyle (incumbent)	Unopposed	
Total votes		53,825	100.0

=== Republican primary ===
==== Candidates ====
===== Nominee =====
- Aaron Bashir

==== Results ====
Republican primary results
Party	Candidate	Votes	%
Republican	Aaron Bashir	Unopposed	
Total votes		11,796	100.0

=== General election ===
==== Predictions ====
Source	Ranking	As of
The Cook Political Report	Solid D	February 23, 2022
Inside Elections	Solid D	March 11, 2022
Sabato's Crystal Ball	Safe D	March 2, 2022
Politico	Solid D	April 5, 2022
RCP	Safe D	June 9, 2022
Fox News	Solid D	July 11, 2022
DDHQ	Solid D	July 20, 2022
538	Solid D	June 30, 2022
The Economist	Safe D	September 28, 2022

==== Results ====
2022 Pennsylvania's 2nd congressional district election
Party	Candidate	Votes	%
Democratic	Brendan Boyle (incumbent)	141,229	75.7
Republican	Aaron Bashir	45,454	24.3
Total votes		186,683	100.0
Democratic hold			

== District 3 ==
2022 Pennsylvania's 3rd congressional district election
- November 8, 2022
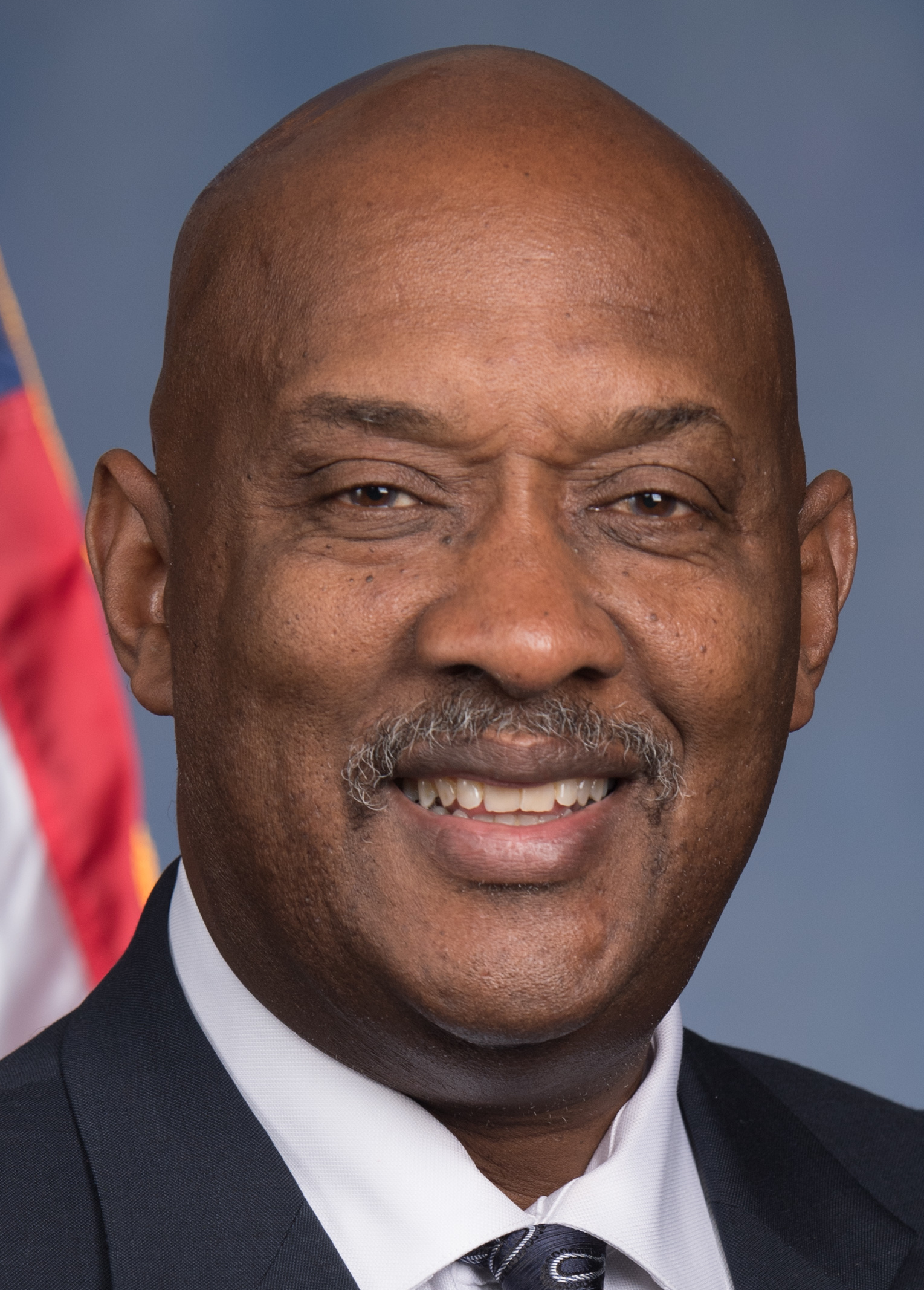

Nominee	Dwight Evans	Christopher Hoeppner
Party	Democratic	Socialist Workers
Popular vote	251,115	12,820
Percentage	95.1%	4.9%
- County results Evans: >90%
U.S. Representative before election
Dwight Evans
Democratic
Elected U.S. Representative
Dwight Evans
Democratic

The 3rd district is based in west and south Philadelphia. The district was mostly unchanged by redistricting. It had a PVI of D+40, making it the second most democratic leaning district in the nation (behind NY-13), and voted for Joe Biden by 81 points. Democrat Dwight Evans, who had represented the district since 2019, was most recently re-elected in 2022 with 95.1% of the vote.

=== Democratic primary ===
==== Candidates ====
===== Nominee =====
- Dwight Evans, incumbent U.S. representative

===== Eliminated in primary =====
- Michael Cogbill
- Alexandra Hunt, public health researcher

===== Declined =====
- Helen Gym, Philadelphia City Councilor

==== Endorsements ====
Dwight Evans

Labor unions

- Health Professionals and Allied Employees

Organizations

- Giffords
- J Street
- League of Conservation Voters
- Planned Parenthood Action Fund
- Sierra Club
Alexandra Hunt

Individuals

- Marianne Williamson, author and candidate for the Democratic nomination for president of the United States in 2020

==== Results ====
Democratic primary results
Party	Candidate	Votes	%
Democratic	Dwight Evans (incumbent)	97,709	75.7
Democratic	Alexandra Hunt	25,712	19.9
Democratic	Michael Cogbill	5,728	4.4
Total votes		129,149	100.0

=== Independent and third-party candidates ===
==== Socialist Workers Party ====
===== Qualified for ballot =====
- Christopher Hoeppner, freight train conductor

=== General election ===
==== Predictions ====
Source	Ranking	As of
The Cook Political Report	Solid D	February 23, 2022
Inside Elections	Solid D	March 11, 2022
Sabato's Crystal Ball	Safe D	March 2, 2022
Politico	Solid D	April 5, 2022
RCP	Safe D	June 9, 2022
Fox News	Solid D	July 11, 2022
DDHQ	Solid D	July 20, 2022
538	Solid D	June 30, 2022
The Economist	Safe D	September 28, 2022

==== Results ====
2022 Pennsylvania's 3rd congressional district election
Party	Candidate	Votes	%
Democratic	Dwight Evans (incumbent)	251,115	95.1
Socialist Workers	Christopher Hoeppner	12,820	4.9
Total votes		263,935	100.0
Democratic hold			

== District 4 ==
2022 Pennsylvania's 4th congressional district election
- November 8, 2022
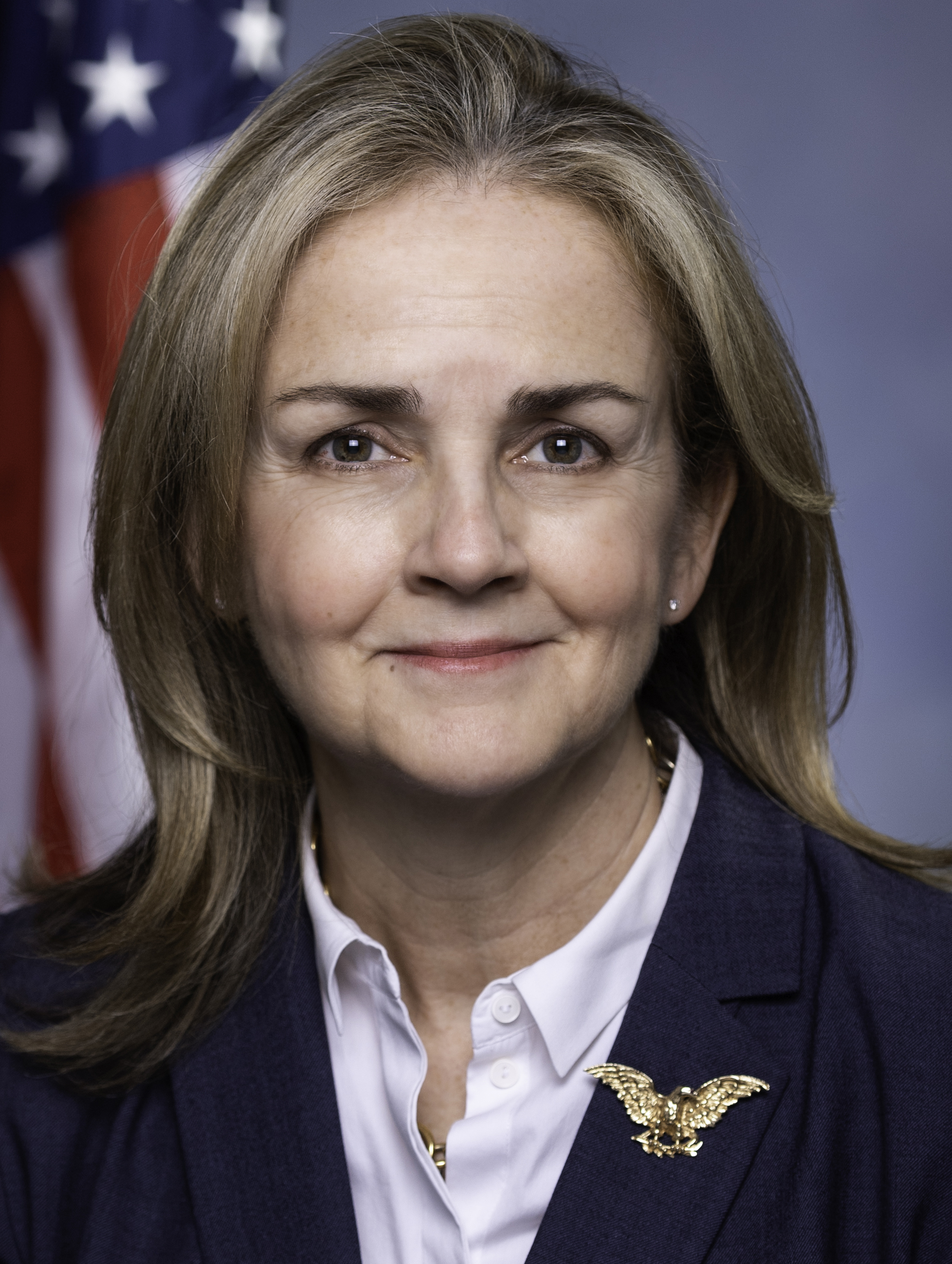

Nominee	Madeleine Dean	Christian Nascimento
Party	Democratic	Republican
Popular vote	224,799	141,986
Percentage	61.3%	38.7%
- County results Dean: 60–70% Nascimento: 50–60%
U.S. Representative before election
Madeleine Dean
Democratic
Elected U.S. Representative
Madeleine Dean
Democratic

The 4th district is based in the western suburbs of Philadelphia, including most of Montgomery County and parts of Berks County. The district was mostly unchanged by redistricting. It had a PVI of D+7, and voted for Joe Biden by 19 points in 2020. Democrat Madeleine Dean, who had represented the district since 2019, was most recently re-elected in 2022, winning 61.3% of the vote in the general election.

=== Democratic primary ===
==== Candidates ====
===== Nominee =====
- Madeleine Dean, incumbent U.S. representative

==== Endorsements ====
Madeleine Dean

Organizations

- AIPAC PAC
- Feminist Majority PAC
- Giffords
- League of Conservation Voters
- Pennsylvania AFL-CIO
- Planned Parenthood Action Fund
- Sierra Club

==== Results ====
Democratic primary results
Party	Candidate	Votes	%
Democratic	Madeleine Dean (incumbent)	Unopposed	
Total votes		96,876	100.0

=== Republican primary ===
==== Candidates ====
===== Nominee =====
- Christian Nascimento, vice president of product at Comcast and former Methacton School Board president

===== Eliminated in primary =====
- Daniel Burton

==== Results ====
Republican primary results
Party	Candidate	Votes	%
Republican	Christian Nascimento	47,192	68.8
Republican	Daniel Burton	21,378	31.2
Total votes		68,570	100.0

=== General election ===
==== Predictions ====
Source	Ranking	As of
The Cook Political Report	Solid D	February 23, 2022
Inside Elections	Solid D	March 11, 2022
Sabato's Crystal Ball	Safe D	March 2, 2022
Politico	Solid D	April 5, 2022
RCP	Safe D	June 9, 2022
Fox News	Solid D	July 11, 2022
DDHQ	Solid D	July 20, 2022
538	Solid D	June 30, 2022
The Economist	Safe D	September 28, 2022

==== Post-primary endorsements ====
Madeleine Dean (D)

Labor unions

- Communications Workers of America
- National Education Association
- SEIU Pennsylvania State Council

Organizations

- Clean Water Action
- Jewish Democratic Council of America
- Population Connection Action Fund
Christian Nascimento (R)

Organizations

- Log Cabin Republicans

==== Results ====
2022 Pennsylvania's 4th congressional district election
Party	Candidate	Votes	%
Democratic	Madeleine Dean (incumbent)	224,799	61.3
Republican	Christian Nascimento	141,986	38.7
Total votes		366,785	100.0
Democratic hold			

== District 5 ==
2022 Pennsylvania's 5th congressional district election
- November 8, 2022
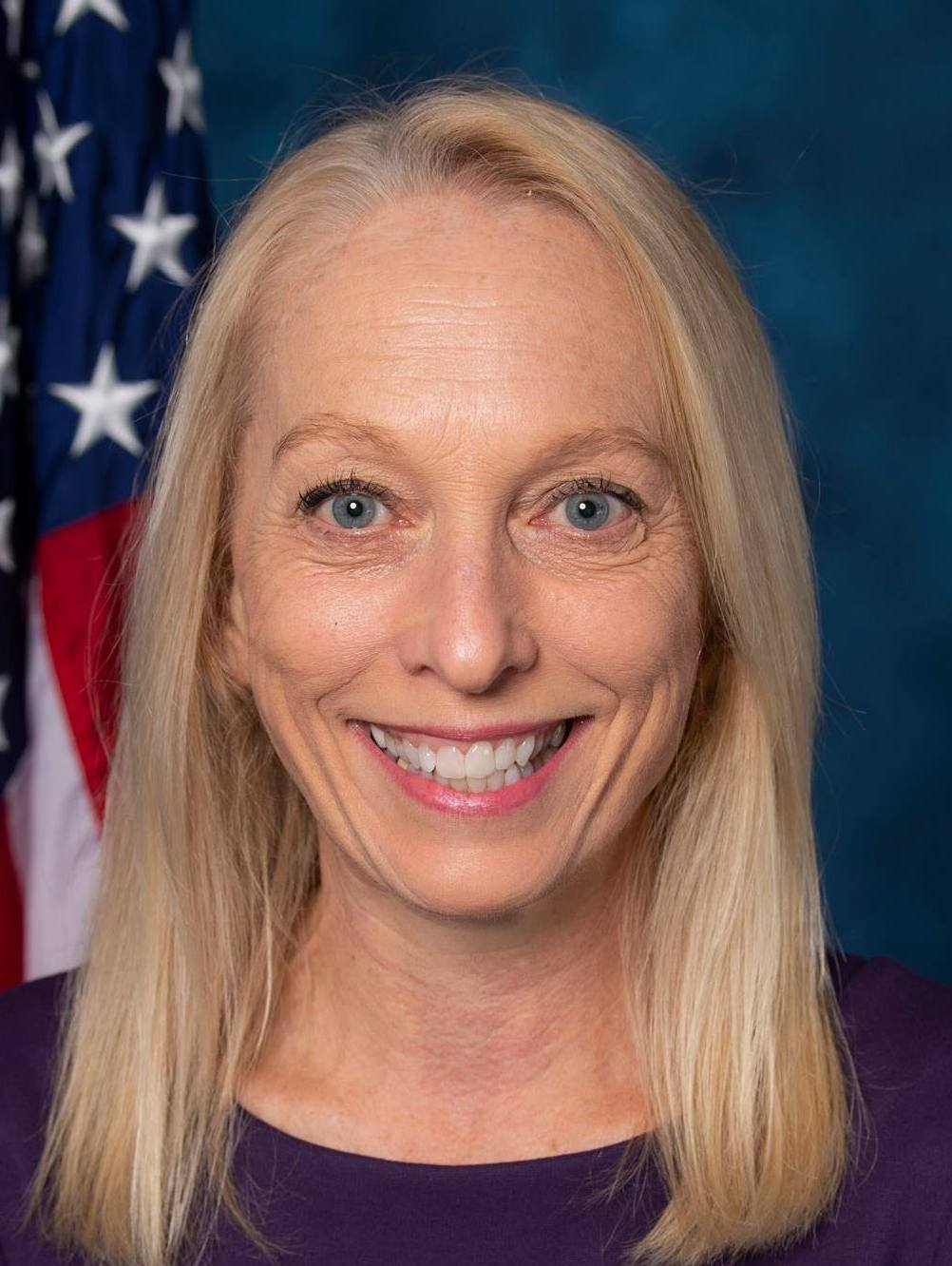

Nominee	Mary Gay Scanlon	David Galluch
Party	Democratic	Republican
Popular vote	205,128	110,058
Percentage	65.1%	34.9%
- County results Scanlon: 60–70% 70–80%
U.S. Representative before election
Mary Gay Scanlon
Democratic
Elected U.S. Representative
Mary Gay Scanlon
Democratic

The 5th district is based in the southwestern suburbs of Philadelphia, including all of Delaware County, parts of Montgomery County, and parts of south Philadelphia. The district was mostly unchanged by redistricting. It had a PVI of D+14, and voted for Joe Biden by 32 points in 2020. Democrat Mary Gay Scanlon, who had represented the district since 2018, was most recently re-elected in 2022, winning 65.1% of the vote in the general election.

=== Democratic primary ===
==== Candidates ====
===== Nominee =====
- Mary Gay Scanlon, incumbent U.S. representative

==== Endorsements ====
Mary Gay Scanlon

Organizations

- Congressional Progressive Caucus PAC
- End Citizens United
- Feminist Majority PAC
- Giffords
- J Street
- League of Conservation Voters
- Planned Parenthood Action Fund
- Sierra Club

==== Results ====
Democratic primary results
Party	Candidate	Votes	%
Democratic	Mary Gay Scanlon (incumbent)	Unopposed	
Total votes		79,816	100.0

=== Republican primary ===
==== Candidates ====
===== Nominee =====
- David Galluch, Navy veteran

==== Results ====
Republican primary results
Party	Candidate	Votes	%
Republican	David Galluch	Unopposed	
Total votes		55,770	100.0

=== Independent and third-party candidates ===
==== Libertarian Party ====
===== Filed paperwork =====
- Robert Margus

=== Forum ===
2022 Pennsylvania's 5th congressional district candidate forum
No.	Date	Host	Moderator	Link	Democratic	Republican
Key: P Participant A Absent N Not invited I Invited W Withdrawn						
Key: P Participant A Absent N Not invited I Invited W Withdrawn					Mary Gay Scanlon	David Galluch
1	Oct. 10, 2022	League of Women Voters of Delaware County; League of Women Voters of Lower Merion & Narberth	Jamie Mogil		P	P

==== Predictions ====
Source	Ranking	As of
The Cook Political Report	Solid D	February 23, 2022
Inside Elections	Solid D	March 11, 2022
Sabato's Crystal Ball	Safe D	March 2, 2022
Politico	Solid D	April 5, 2022
RCP	Safe D	June 9, 2022
Fox News	Solid D	July 11, 2022
DDHQ	Solid D	July 20, 2022
538	Solid D	June 30, 2022
The Economist	Safe D	September 28, 2022

==== Results ====
2022 Pennsylvania's 5th congressional district election
Party	Candidate	Votes	%
Democratic	Mary Gay Scanlon (incumbent)	205,128	65.1
Republican	David Galluch	110,058	34.9
Total votes		315,186	100.0
Democratic hold			

== District 6 ==
2022 Pennsylvania's 6th congressional district election
- November 8, 2022
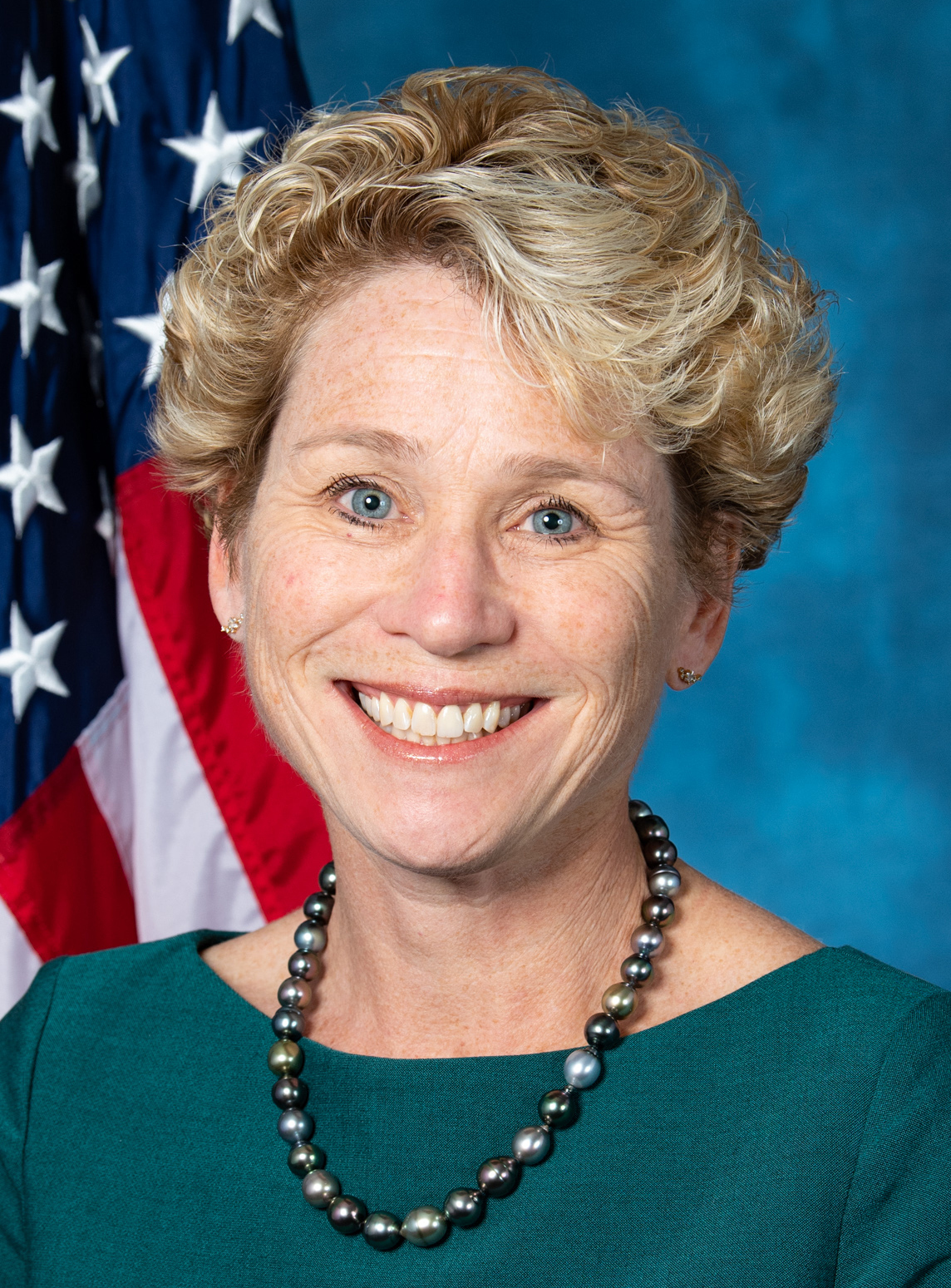

Nominee	Chrissy Houlahan	Guy Ciarrocchi
Party	Democratic	Republican
Popular vote	190,386	136,097
Percentage	58.3%	41.7%
- County results Houlahan: 50–60%
U.S. Representative before election
Chrissy Houlahan
Democratic
Elected U.S. Representative
Chrissy Houlahan
Democratic

The 6th district includes all of Chester County and the city of Reading in Berks County. The district was mostly unchanged by redistricting. It had a PVI of D+5, and voted for Joe Biden by 15 points in 2020. Democrat Chrissy Houlahan, who had represented the district since 2019, was most recently re-elected in 2022, garnering 58.3% of the vote in the general election.

=== Democratic primary ===
==== Candidates ====
===== Nominee =====
- Chrissy Houlahan, incumbent U.S. representative

==== Endorsements ====
Chrissy Houlahan

Organizations

- 314 Action
- AIPAC PAC
- End Citizens United
- Feminist Majority PAC
- Giffords
- National Women's Political Caucus
- New Politics
- Planned Parenthood Action Fund
- Sierra Club
- VoteVets.org

==== Results ====
Democratic primary results
Party	Candidate	Votes	%
Democratic	Chrissy Houlahan (incumbent)	Unopposed	
Total votes		71,950	100.0

=== Republican primary ===
==== Candidates ====
===== Nominee =====
- Guy Ciarrocchi, CEO of the Chester County Chamber of Business & Industry and former chief of staff to Lieutenant Governor Jim Cawley

===== Eliminated in primary =====
- Steve Fanelli, businessman
- Regina Mauro, businesswoman
- Ron Vogel, realtor

==== Endorsements ====
Regina Mauro

Organizations

- Republican National Hispanic Assembly

==== Results ====
Republican primary results
Party	Candidate	Votes	%
Republican	Guy Ciarrochi	23,369	33.1
Republican	Steve Fanelli	21,146	29.9
Republican	Ron Vogel	15,628	22.1
Republican	Regina Mauro	10,565	14.9
Total votes		70,708	100.0

=== General election ===
==== Debate ====
2022 Pennsylvania's 6th congressional district debate
No.	Date	Host	Moderator	Link	Democratic	Republican
Key: P Participant A Absent N Not invited I Invited W Withdrawn						
Key: P Participant A Absent N Not invited I Invited W Withdrawn					Chrissy Houlahan	Guy Ciarrocchi
1	Oct. 25, 2022	Greater Reading; Unity Coalition	Anthony Orozco		P	P

==== Predictions ====
Source	Ranking	As of
The Cook Political Report	Solid D	February 23, 2022
Inside Elections	Solid D	March 11, 2022
Sabato's Crystal Ball	Likely D	March 2, 2022
Politico	Likely D	April 5, 2022
RCP	Lean D	October 17, 2022
Fox News	Solid D	July 11, 2022
DDHQ	Likely D	November 1, 2022
538	Solid D	June 30, 2022
The Economist	Likely D	November 1, 2022

==== Post-primary endorsements ====
Chrissy Houlahan (D)

Labor unions

- National Education Association
- Pennsylvania AFL-CIO

Organizations

- Clean Water Action
- Council for a Livable World
- EMILY's List
- Everytown for Gun Safety
- Human Rights Campaign
- League of Conservation Voters
- NARAL Pro-Choice America
- National Organization for Women PAC
Guy Ciarrocchi

Statewide officials

- Timothy DeFoor, Auditor General of Pennsylvania (2021–present)

U.S. representatives

- Lloyd Smucker, PA-16 (2017–2019), PA-8 (2019–present)

State legislators

- Harry Lewis, Pennsylvania state representative, 74th district (2015–2018)

Organizations

- National Federation of Independent Business
- National Right to Life Committee

==== Results ====
2022 Pennsylvania's 6th congressional district election
Party	Candidate	Votes	%
Democratic	Chrissy Houlahan (incumbent)	190,386	58.3
Republican	Guy Ciarrocchi	136,097	41.7
Total votes		326,483	100.0
Democratic hold			

== District 7 ==
2022 Pennsylvania's 7th congressional district election
- November 8, 2022
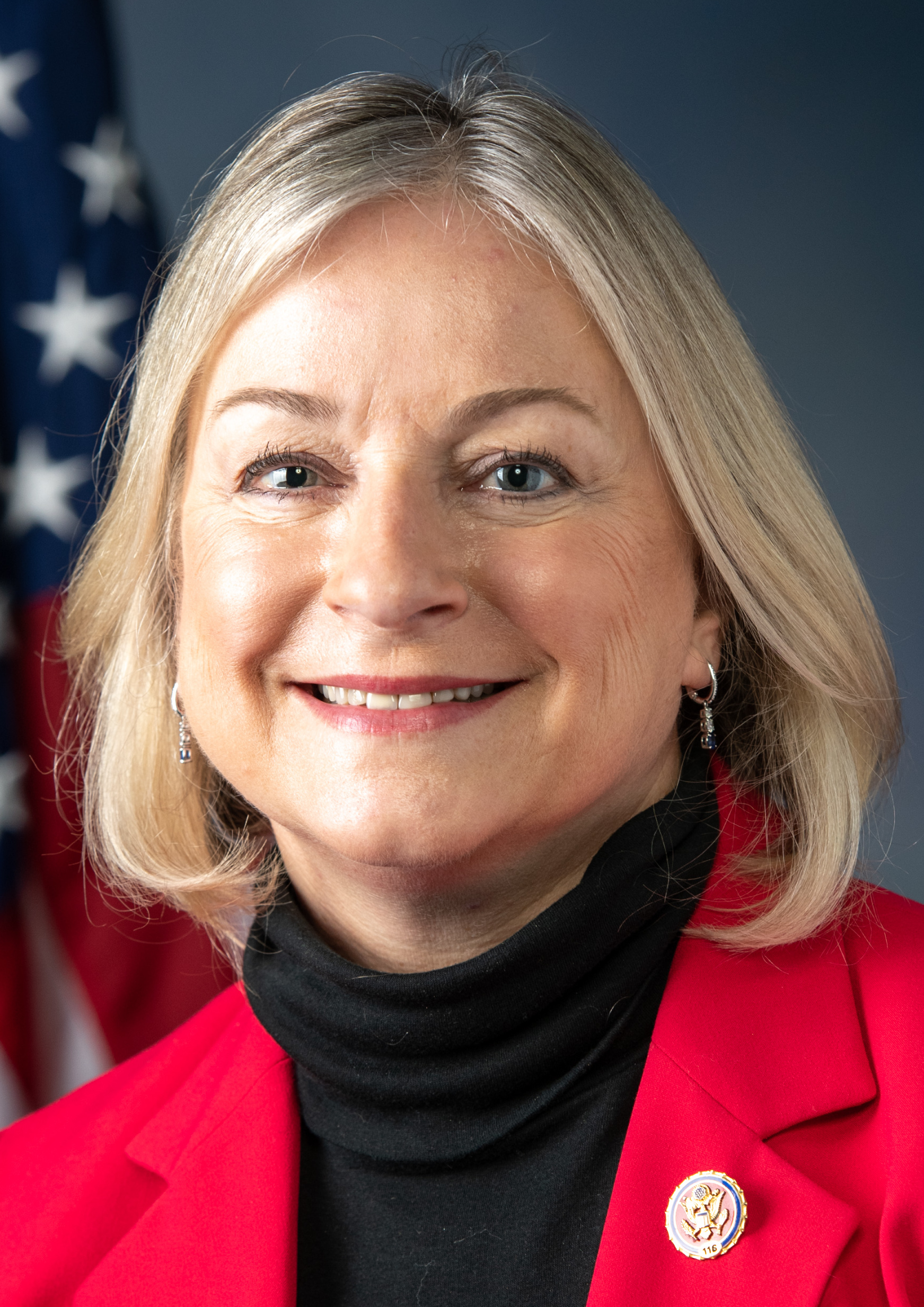

Nominee	Susan Wild	Lisa Scheller
Party	Democratic	Republican
Popular vote	151,364	145,527
Percentage	51.0%	49.0%
- Wild: 40–50% 50–60% 60–70% 70–80% 80–90% Scheller: 50–60% 60–70% 70–80% 80–90% Tie: 50%
U.S. Representative before election
Susan Wild
Democratic
Elected U.S. Representative
Susan Wild
Democratic

The 7th district is based in the Lehigh Valley, including all of Lehigh, Northampton, and Carbon counties and a small sliver of Monroe County. The district was modestly altered by redistricting, losing Stroudsburg in exchange for Carbon County. This made the district more conservative, with a PVI of R+2, but it voted for Joe Biden by 0.6 points in 2020. Democrat Susan Wild, a representative since 2018, was most recently re-elected in 2022, winning 51.0% of the vote.

During the campaign, a research firm contracted by the Democratic Congressional Campaign Committee inappropriately obtained the military records of candidate Kevin Dellicker.

=== Democratic primary ===
==== Candidates ====
===== Nominee =====
- Susan Wild, incumbent U.S. representative

==== Endorsements ====
Susan Wild

Organizations

- AIPAC PAC
- Democratic Majority for Israel
- EMILY's List
- End Citizens United
- Feminist Majority PAC
- Giffords
- Humane Society of the United States Legislative Fund
- League of Conservation Voters
- NARAL Pro-Choice America
- Planned Parenthood Action Fund
- Pro-Israel America
- Sierra Club

Labor unions

- National Education Association

==== Results ====
Democratic primary results
Party	Candidate	Votes	%
Democratic	Susan Wild (incumbent)	Unopposed	
Total votes		63,817	100.0

=== Republican primary ===
==== Candidates ====
===== Nominee =====
- Lisa Scheller, former Lehigh County commissioner and nominee for Pennsylvania's 7th congressional district in 2020

===== Eliminated in primary =====
- Kevin Dellicker, businessman and former National Guardsman

===== Withdrew =====
- Ryan Mackenzie, state representative from the 134th district

==== Endorsements ====
Lisa Scheller

Executive branch officials

- Mike Pompeo, United States Secretary of State (2018–2021), Director of the Central Intelligence Agency (2017–2018), U.S. representative from Kansas's 4th congressional district (2011–2017)

U.S. representatives

- Kevin McCarthy, House Minority Leader (2019–2023), House Majority Leader (2014–2019), U.S. representative from California's 23rd congressional district (2013–present), California's 22nd congressional district (2007–2013)

Organizations

- Maggie's List

==== Results ====
Republican primary results
Party	Candidate	Votes	%
Republican	Lisa Scheller	34,504	51.3
Republican	Kevin Dellicker	32,713	48.7
Total votes		67,217	100.0

=== General election ===
==== Debate ====
2022 Pennsylvania's 7th congressional district debate
No.	Date	Host	Moderator	Link	Democratic	Republican
Key: P Participant A Absent N Not invited I Invited W Withdrawn						
Key: P Participant A Absent N Not invited I Invited W Withdrawn					Susan Wild	Lisa Scheller
1	Oct. 21, 2022	Lehigh Valley News; WLVR-FM; WLVT-TV	Jen Rehill; Tom Shortell		P	P

==== Predictions ====
Source	Ranking	As of
The Cook Political Report	Tossup	October 5, 2022
Inside Elections	Tossup	March 11, 2022
Sabato's Crystal Ball	Lean R (flip)	November 7, 2022
Politico	Tossup	April 5, 2022
RCP	Lean R (flip)	June 9, 2022
Fox News	Lean R (flip)	July 11, 2022
DDHQ	Tossup	July 20, 2022
538	Tossup	August 3, 2022
The Economist	Tossup	September 28, 2022

==== Polling ====
Poll source	Date(s) administered	Sample size	Margin of error	Susan Wild (D)	Lisa Scheller (R)	Other	Undecided
Muhlenberg College	October 12–14, 2022	404 (LV)	± 6.0%	47%	46%	4%	4%
RMG Research	July 31 – August 5, 2022	400 (LV)	± 4.9%	43%	47%	2%	8%

==== Results ====
2022 Pennsylvania's 7th congressional district election
Party	Candidate	Votes	%
Democratic	Susan Wild (incumbent)	151,364	51.0
Republican	Lisa Scheller	145,527	49.0
Total votes		296,891	100.0
Democratic hold			

== District 8 ==
2022 Pennsylvania's 8th congressional district election
- November 8, 2022
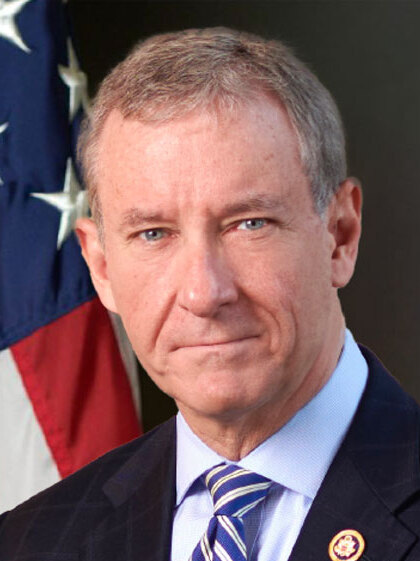

Nominee	Matt Cartwright	Jim Bognet
Party	Democratic	Republican
Popular vote	146,956	139,930
Percentage	51.2%	48.8%
- Cartwright: 50–60% 60–70% 70–80% 80–90% Bognet: 50–60% 60–70% 70–80%
U.S. Representative before election
Matt Cartwright
Democratic
Elected U.S. Representative
Matt Cartwright
Democratic

The 8th district is based in Northeast Pennsylvania, specifically the Wyoming Valley and Pocono Mountains, including all of Lackawanna, Wayne, and Pike counties, and most of Luzerne and Monroe counties. The district added Stroudsburg in redistricting, making it slightly more liberal. It had a PVI of R+4, and voted for Donald Trump by 3 points in 2020. Democrat Matt Cartwright, who had represented the district since 2013, was most recently re-elected in 2022, garnering 51.2% of the vote in the general election.

=== Democratic primary ===
==== Candidates ====
===== Nominee =====
- Matt Cartwright, incumbent U.S. representative

==== Endorsements ====
Matt Cartwright

Organizations

- AIPAC PAC
- End Citizens United
- Feminist Majority PAC
- Humane Society of the United States Legislative Fund
- J Street
- League of Conservation Voters
- Sierra Club

Labor unions

- National Education Association

==== Results ====
Democratic primary results
Party	Candidate	Votes	%
Democratic	Matt Cartwright (incumbent)	Unopposed	
Total votes		68,696	100.0

=== Republican primary ===
==== Candidates ====
===== Nominee =====
- Jim Bognet, former senior vice president for communications of the Export–Import Bank of the United States and nominee for Pennsylvania's 8th congressional district in 2020

===== Eliminated in primary =====
- Michael Marsicano, former mayor of Hazleton and candidate for Pennsylvania's 8th congressional district in 2020

===== Withdrawn =====
- Teddy Daniels, former police officer and U.S. Army veteran (ran for lt. governor)

==== Endorsements ====
Jim Bognet

U.S. executive branch officials

- Donald Trump, president of the United States (2017–2021)

==== Results ====
Republican primary results
Party	Candidate	Votes	%
Republican	Jim Bognet	47,097	68.7
Republican	Michael Marsicano	21,436	31.3
Total votes		68,533	100.0

=== General election ===
==== Predictions ====
Source	Ranking	As of
The Cook Political Report	Tossup	February 23, 2022
Inside Elections	Tossup	March 11, 2022
Sabato's Crystal Ball	Lean R (flip)	November 7, 2022
Politico	Tossup	April 5, 2022
RCP	Lean R (flip)	June 9, 2022
Fox News	Tossup	July 11, 2022
DDHQ	Tossup	October 1, 2022
538	Tossup	November 8, 2022
The Economist	Tossup	September 28, 2022

==== Post-primary endorsements ====
Matt Cartwright (D)

Organizations

- National Committee to Preserve Social Security and Medicare

Labor unions

- Communications Workers of America
Jim Bognet (R)

Organizations

- CatholicVote
- House Freedom Fund
- National Federation of Independent Business
- National Right to Life Committee
- Republican Jewish Coalition
- Susan B. Anthony Pro-Life America

==== Debates and forums ====
2022 PA-8 debates and forums
No.	Date	Host	Moderator	Link	Participants	
P Participant A Absent N Non-invitee I Invitee W Withdrawn						
P Participant A Absent N Non-invitee I Invitee W Withdrawn					Bognet	Cartwright
1	October 20, 2022	WVIA-TV	Larry Vojtko	C-SPAN	P	P

==== Polling ====
Aggregate polls

Source of poll aggregation	Dates administered	Dates updated	Matt Cartwright (D)	Jim Bognet (R)	Undecided (Note: Calculated by taking the difference of 100% and all other candidates combined.)	Margin
FiveThirtyEight	June 23 – October 28, 2022	October 31, 2022	48.1%	45.0%	6.9%	Cartwright +3.1

Graphical summary

Poll source	Date(s) administered	Sample size	Margin of error	Matt Cartwright (D)	Jim Bognet (R)	Undecided
Siena College/The New York Times	October 19–20, 2022	415 (LV)	–	50%	44%	6%
Patriot Polling	October 7–9, 2022	289 (RV)	–	40%	43%	17%
GQR Research (D) (Note: This poll was sponsored by Cartwright's campaign)	September 12–15, 2022	400 (LV)	± 4.0%	52%	44%	3%
Cygnal (R) (Note: Poll sponsored jointly by the National Republican Congressional Committee and Bognet's campaign committee)	September 6–8, 2022	440 (LV)	–	48%	48%	4%
GQR Research (D)	August 2–9, 2022	500 (LV)	± 4.4%	52%	46%	1%
Cygnal (R)	June 23–25, 2022	400 (LV)	± 4.7%	45%	46%	9%

Hypothetical polling

Generic Democrat vs. generic Republican

Poll source	Date(s) administered	Sample size	Margin of error	Generic Democrat	Generic Republican	Undecided
GQR Research (D)	August 2–9, 2022	500 (LV)	± 4.4%	49%	48%	3%
Cygnal (R)	June 23–25, 2022	400 (LV)	± 4.7%	44%	49%	7%

==== Results ====
2022 Pennsylvania's 8th congressional district election
Party	Candidate	Votes	%
Democratic	Matt Cartwright (incumbent)	146,956	51.2
Republican	Jim Bognet	139,930	48.8
Total votes		286,886	100.0
Democratic hold			

== District 9 ==
2022 Pennsylvania's 9th congressional district election
- November 8, 2022
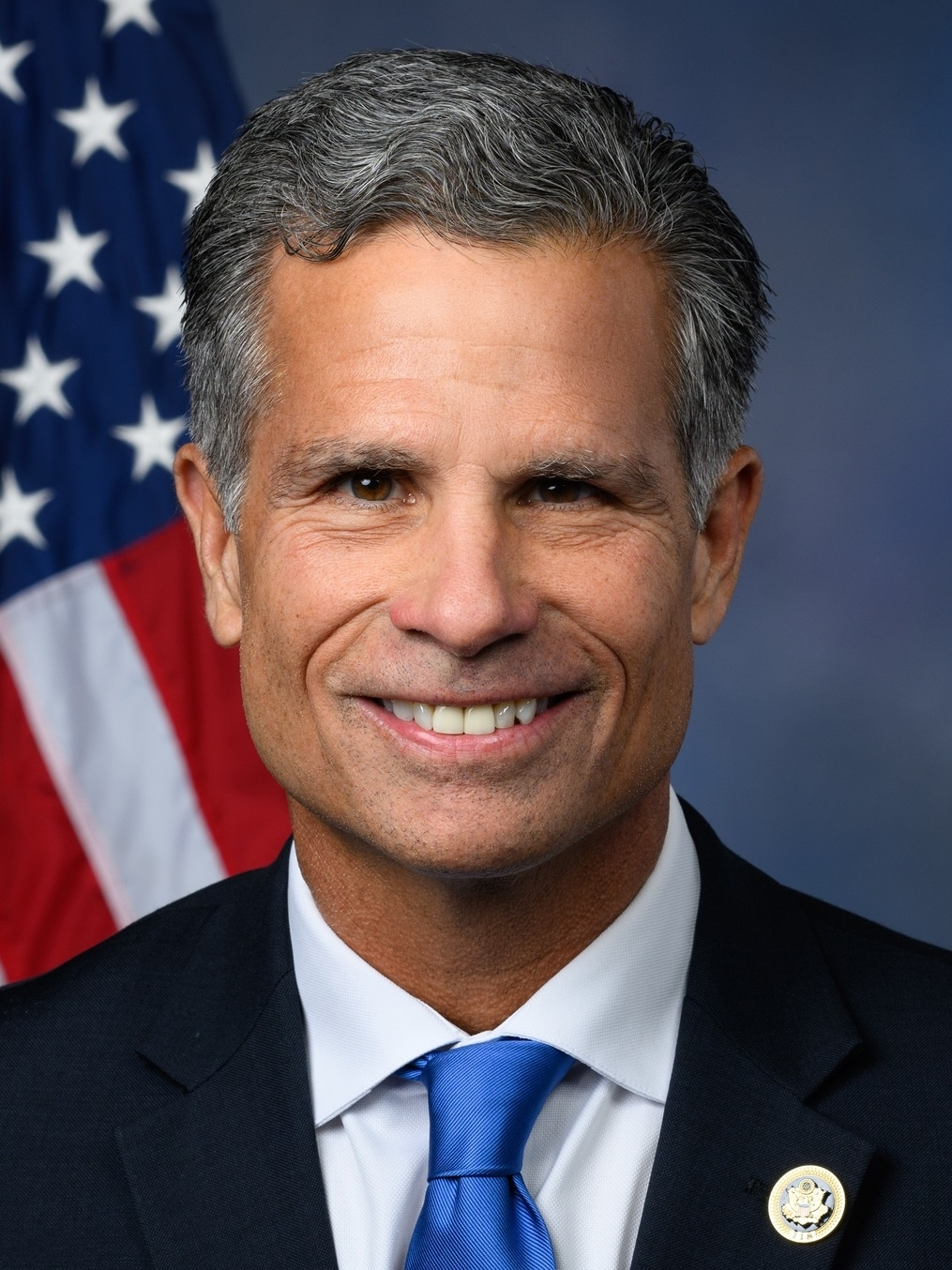

Nominee	Dan Meuser	Amanda Waldman
Party	Republican	Democratic
Popular vote	209,185	92,622
Percentage	69.3%	30.7%
- County results Meuser: 60–70% 70–80%
U.S. Representative before election
Dan Meuser (Republican)
Fred Keller (Republican)
Elected U.S. Representative
Dan Meuser
Republican

The 9th district is based in North Central Pennsylvania east of the Appalachian Divide, including Williamsport, Bloomsburg, and Lebanon. The district kept most of its territory and added much of the now defunct 12th district in redistricting. It had a PVI of R+21, and voted for Donald Trump by 37 points in 2020. Republican Dan Meuser, who had represented the district since 2019, was re-elected with 66.3% of the vote in 2020. Meuser ran for re-election. Republican Fred Keller, who had represented the 12th district since 2019, was re-elected with 70.8% of the vote in 2020 and redistricted into the 15th district, but switched to run in the 9th district. However, on February 28, Keller announced that he would retire instead of go through a primary against Meuser. Meuser went on to win the general election in 2022, garnering 69.3% of the vote.

=== Republican primary ===
==== Candidates ====
===== Nominee =====
- Dan Meuser, incumbent U.S. representative

===== Withdrawn =====
- Fred Keller, incumbent U.S. representative

==== Endorsements ====
Dan Meuser

Organizations

- AIPAC PAC

==== Results ====
Republican primary results
Party	Candidate	Votes	%
Republican	Dan Meuser (incumbent)	Unopposed	
Total votes		102,180	100.0

=== Democratic primary ===
==== Candidates ====
===== Nominee =====
- Amanda Waldman, Medicare financial representative

==== Results ====
Democratic primary results
Party	Candidate	Votes	%
Democratic	Amanda Waldman	Unopposed	
Total votes		41,622	100.0

=== Independents and third-party candidates ===
==== Libertarian Party ====
===== Withdrawn =====
- Liz Terwilliger, candidate for Pennsylvania's 12th congressional district in 2020

=== General election ===
==== Predictions ====
Source	Ranking	As of
The Cook Political Report	Solid R	February 23, 2022
Inside Elections	Solid R	March 11, 2022
Sabato's Crystal Ball	Safe R	March 2, 2022
Politico	Solid R	April 5, 2022
RCP	Safe R	June 9, 2022
Fox News	Solid R	July 11, 2022
DDHQ	Solid R	July 20, 2022
538	Solid R	June 30, 2022
The Economist	Safe R	September 28, 2022

==== Endorsements ====
Dan Meuser (R)

Organizations

- Council for Citizens Against Government Waste PAC
- National Right to Life Committee

Newspapers

- Williamsport Sun-Gazette
Amanda Waldman (D)

Labor unions

- Communications Workers of America

==== Debates and forums ====
2022 PA-9 debates and forums
No.	Date	Host	Moderator	Link	Participants	
P Participant A Absent N Non-invitee I Invitee W Withdrawn						
P Participant A Absent N Non-invitee I Invitee W Withdrawn					Meuser	Waldman
1	October 21, 2022	WVIA-TV	Larry Vojtko	PAhomepage	P	P

==== Results ====
2022 Pennsylvania's 9th congressional district election
Party	Candidate	Votes	%
Republican	Dan Meuser (incumbent)	209,185	69.3
Democratic	Amanda Waldman	92,622	30.7
Total votes		301,807	100.0
Republican hold			

== District 10 ==
2022 Pennsylvania's 10th congressional district election
- November 8, 2022
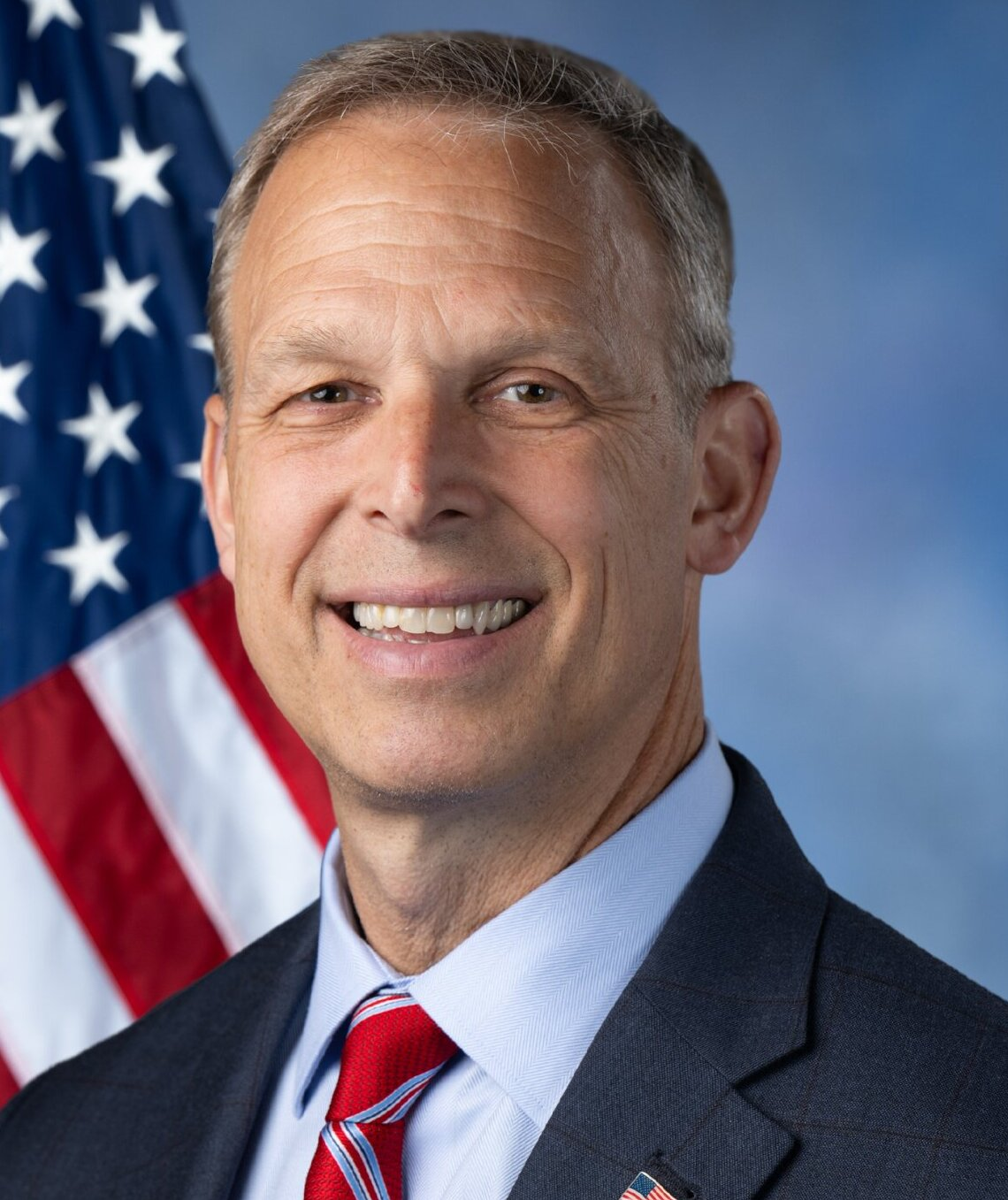

Nominee	Scott Perry	Shamaine Daniels
Party	Republican	Democratic
Popular vote	169,331	145,215
Percentage	53.8%	46.2%
- County results Perry: 50–60% Daniels: 50–60%
U.S. Representative before election
Scott Perry
Republican
Elected U.S. Representative
Scott Perry
Republican

The 10th district is based in the Harrisburg and York areas, including all of Dauphin County, most of Cumberland County, and the northern half of York County. The district was mostly unchanged by redistricting. It had a PVI of R+5, and voted for Donald Trump by 4 points in 2020. Republican Scott Perry, who had represented the district since 2013, was most recently re-elected in 2022, winning 53.8% of the vote.

=== Republican primary ===
==== Candidates ====
===== Nominee =====
- Scott Perry, incumbent U.S. representative and chair of the Freedom Caucus

===== Did not file =====
- Brian Allen, clinical psychologist

==== Endorsements ====
Scott Perry

U.S. executive branch officials

- Donald Trump, 45th president of the United States

Organizations

- AIPAC PAC
- House Freedom Fund

==== Results ====
Republican primary results
Party	Candidate	Votes	%
Republican	Scott Perry (incumbent)	Unopposed	
Total votes		84,646	100.0

=== Democratic primary ===
==== Candidates ====
===== Nominee =====
- Shamaine Daniels, at-large member of Harrisburg city council (2014–present)

===== Eliminated in primary =====
- Rick Coplen, Carlisle school board member, retired Army officer, and candidate for Pennsylvania State Senate in 2020

===== Declined =====
- Tom Brier, attorney and candidate for this seat in 2020
- Eugene DePasquale, former Pennsylvania Auditor General and nominee for Pennsylvania's 10th congressional district in 2020

==== Results ====
Democratic primary results
Party	Candidate	Votes	%
Democratic	Shamaine Daniels	32,260	52.6
Democratic	Rick Coplen	29,128	47.4
Total votes		61,388	100.0

=== General election ===
==== Predictions ====
Source	Ranking	As of
The Cook Political Report	Solid R	May 26, 2022
Inside Elections	Solid R	March 11, 2022
Sabato's Crystal Ball	Safe R	April 19, 2022
Politico	Likely R	November 3, 2022
RCP	Likely R	June 9, 2022
Fox News	Solid R	July 11, 2022
DDHQ	Solid R	July 20, 2022
538	Solid R	June 30, 2022
The Economist	Likely R	September 28, 2022

==== Polling ====
Poll source	Date(s) administered	Sample size	Margin of error	Scott Perry (R)	Shamaine Daniels (D)	Undecided
Public Policy Polling (D) (Note: This poll was sponsored by Daniels's campaign)	August 9–10, 2022	714 (LV)	± 3.7%	41%	44%	15%

==== Results ====
2022 Pennsylvania's 10th congressional district election
Party	Candidate	Votes	%
Republican	Scott Perry (incumbent)	169,331	53.8
Democratic	Shamaine Daniels	145,215	46.2
Total votes		314,546	100.0
Republican hold			

== District 11 ==
2022 Pennsylvania's 11th congressional district election
- November 8, 2022
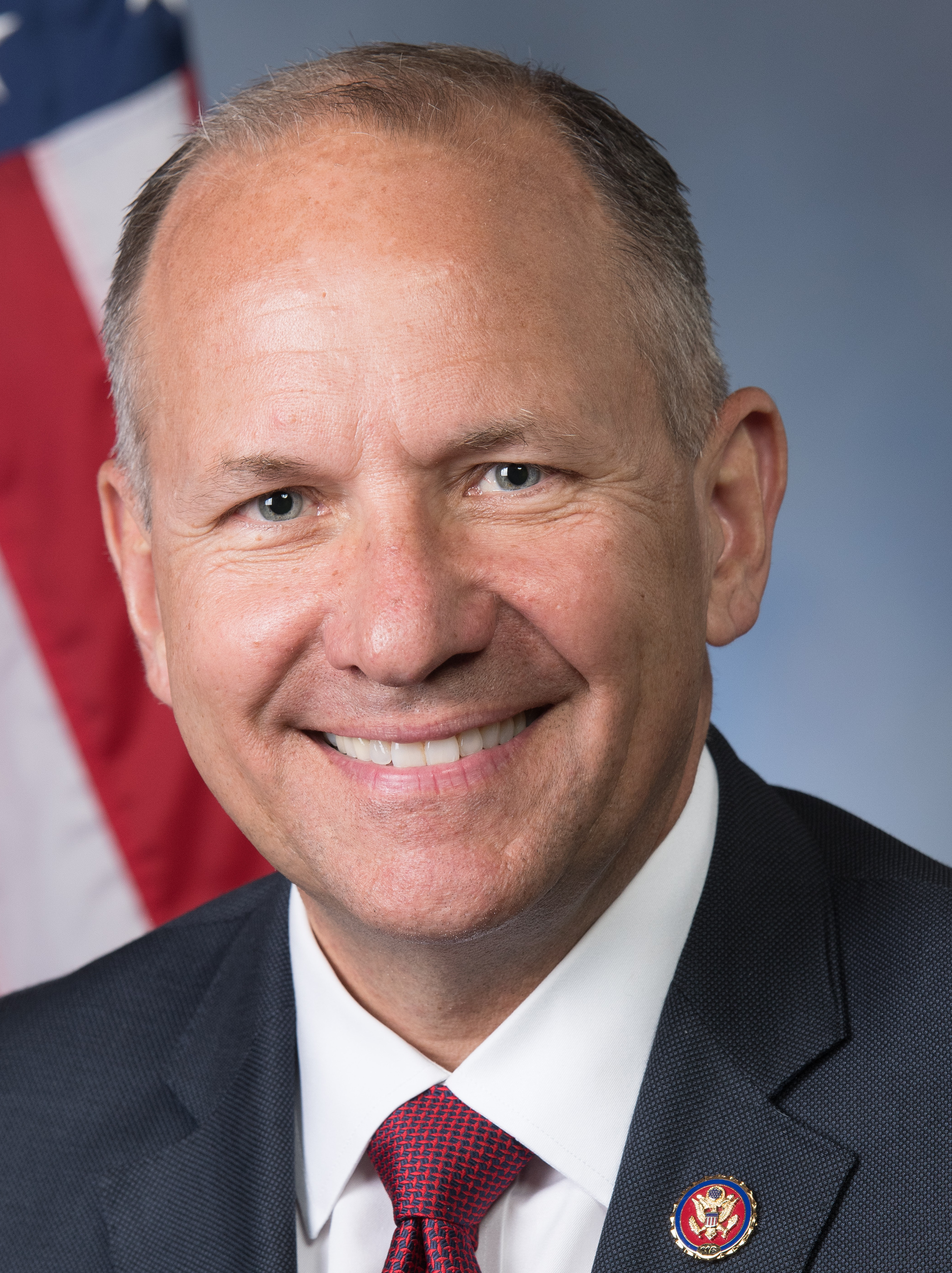

Nominee	Lloyd Smucker	Robert Hollister
Party	Republican	Democratic
Popular vote	194,991	121,835
Percentage	61.5%	38.5%
- County results Smucker: 50–60% 60–70%
U.S. Representative before election
Lloyd Smucker
Republican
Elected U.S. Representative
Lloyd Smucker
Republican

The 11th district is based in Pennsylvania Dutch Country, including all of Lancaster County and the southern half of York County. The district was mostly unchanged by redistricting. It had a PVI of R+14, and voted for Donald Trump by 21 points in 2020. Republican Lloyd Smucker, who had represented the district since 2017, was most recently re-elected in 2022, winning 61.5% of the vote.

=== Republican primary ===
==== Candidates ====
===== Nominee =====
- Lloyd Smucker, incumbent U.S. representative

==== Endorsements ====
Lloyd Smucker

U.S. executive branch officials

- Donald Trump, former president of the United States (2017–2021)

Organizations

- AIPAC PAC

==== Results ====
Republican primary results
Party	Candidate	Votes	%
Republican	Lloyd Smucker (incumbent)	Unopposed	
Total votes		96,886	100.0

=== Democratic primary ===
==== Candidates ====
===== Nominee =====
- Bob Hollister, Eastern Lancaster County School superintendent (2008–2022)

==== Endorsements ====
Bob Hollister

Trade unions

- Pennsylvania AFL-CIO

==== Results ====
Democratic primary results
Party	Candidate	Votes	%
Democratic	Bob Hollister	Unopposed	
Total votes		46,080	100.0

=== Independents and other parties ===
==== Libertarian Party ====
===== Failed to qualify for ballot =====
- Dave Womack, Dallastown Borough Council-elect, criminal justice activist

=== General election ===
==== Predictions ====
Source	Ranking	As of
The Cook Political Report	Solid R	February 23, 2022
Inside Elections	Solid R	March 11, 2022
Sabato's Crystal Ball	Safe R	March 2, 2022
Politico	Solid R	April 5, 2022
RCP	Safe R	June 9, 2022
Fox News	Solid R	July 11, 2022
DDHQ	Solid R	July 20, 2022
538	Solid R	June 30, 2022
The Economist	Safe R	September 28, 2022

==== Post-primary endorsements ====
Lloyd Smucker (R)

Organizations

- Council for Citizens Against Government Waste PAC
- National Right to Life Committee
Bob Hollister (D)

U.S. senators

- Bob Casey Jr., Pennsylvania (2007–present)
- Chris Coons, Delaware (2010–present)

Statewide officials

- Eugene DePasquale, Pennsylvania Auditor General (2013–2021), Pennsylvania state representative from the 95th district (2007–2013)

State legislators

- Patty Kim, Pennsylvania state representative from the 103rd district (2013–present)
- Mike Sturla, Pennsylvania state representative from the 96th district (1991–present)

Local officials

- Rick Gray, mayor of Lancaster (2006–2018)
- Izzy Smith-Wade-El, Lancaster City Council president, 2022 candidate for Pennsylvania House of Representatives, District 49
- Danene Sorace, mayor of Lancaster (2018–present)
- John Trescot, Lancaster County commissioner

Trade unions

- Alliance for Retired Americans
- National Education Association
- United Auto Workers

==== Results ====
2022 Pennsylvania's 11th congressional district election
Party	Candidate	Votes	%
Republican	Lloyd Smucker (incumbent)	194,991	61.5
Democratic	Bob Hollister	121,835	38.5
Total votes		316,826	100.0
Republican hold			

== District 12 ==
2022 Pennsylvania's 12th congressional district election
- November 8, 2022
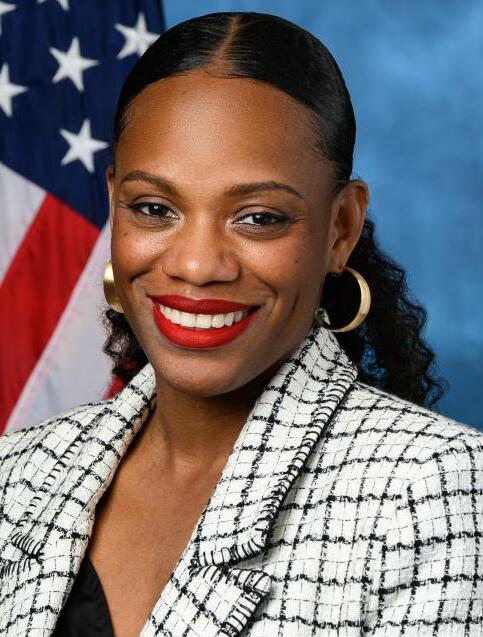

Nominee	Summer Lee	Mike Doyle (Note: No relation to Democratic incumbent Mike Doyle)
Party	Democratic	Republican
Popular vote	184,674	143,946
Percentage	56.2%	43.8%
- County results Lee: 60–70% Doyle: 60–70%
U.S. Representative before election
Mike Doyle (Note: The 18th district was eliminated in redistricting. Retiring 18th district Democratic incumbent Mike Doyle lived within the boundaries of the new 12th district. Retiring 12th district Republican incumbent Fred Keller did not live within the boundaries of the new 12th district.)
Democratic
Elected U.S. Representative
Summer Lee
Democratic

The 12th district is based in the city of Pittsburgh and its eastern and southern suburbs, including parts of Allegheny and Westmoreland counties. The district was numbered the 18th district before redistricting, with the old 12th district now eliminated. The district expanded into parts of Westmoreland County due to redistricting. It had a PVI of D+8, and voted for Joe Biden by 20 points in 2020. Democrat Mike Doyle had represented the district since 1995. He was re-elected with 69.3% of the vote in 2020. Doyle announced that he would not seek re-election in 2022. He was succeeded in Congress by Pennsylvania State House Representative Summer Lee, who was elected with 56.2% of the vote.

=== Democratic primary ===
==== Candidates ====
===== Nominee =====
- Summer Lee, state representative from the 34th district

===== Eliminated in primary =====
- Jerry Dickinson, law professor and candidate for Pennsylvania's 18th congressional district in 2020
- Steve Irwin, attorney, chair of the United States Commission on Civil Rights for Pennsylvania and former commissioner of the Pennsylvania Department of Banking & Securities
- William Parker, businessman, activist and 2021 candidate for Pittsburgh mayor
- Jeff Woodard, executive director at Pennsylvania College Access Program

===== Withdrew =====
- Stephanie Fox, former Brentwood city councilor (endorsed Irwin, ran for state representative)
- Bhavini Patel, Edgewood borough councilor

===== Declined =====
- Mike Doyle, incumbent U.S. representative (endorsed Irwin)

==== Endorsements ====
Jerry Dickinson

Party officials

- Jim Burn, chair of the Pennsylvania Democratic Party (2010–2015)

Organizations

- Brand New Congress
- J Street (co-endorsement with Lee)
Steve Irwin

Executive branch officials

- Patrick Murphy, acting U.S. Secretary of the Army (2016), U.S. Under Secretary of the Army (2016–2017), former U.S. representative from Pennsylvania's 8th congressional district (2007–2011)

Governors

- Ed Rendell, governor of Pennsylvania (2003–2011), general chair of the Democratic National Committee (1999–2001), mayor of Philadelphia (1992–2000), District Attorney of Philadelphia (1978–1986)

U.S. representatives

- Mike Doyle, U.S. representative from Pennsylvania's 18th congressional district (2019–2022), Pennsylvania's 14th congressional district (2003–2019), Pennsylvania's 18th congressional district (1995–2003)
- Allyson Schwartz, former U.S. representative from Pennsylvania's 13th congressional district (2005–2015), Pennsylvania state senator from the 4th district (1991–2005), candidate for governor in 2014

State legislators

- Dan Frankel, Pennsylvania state representative from the 23rd district (1999–present)

Local officials

- Mike Cherepko, mayor of McKeesport (2011–present)
- Rich Fitzgerald, chief executive of Allegheny County (2012–present)
- Bruce Kraus, Pittsburgh City Councilor from the 3rd district (2008–present), president of the Pittsburgh City Council (2014–2020)
- Dan Lavelle, Pittsburgh City Councilor from the 6th district (2010–present)
- Thomas J. Murphy Jr., former mayor of Pittsburgh (1994–2006), Pennsylvania state representative from the 20th district (1983–1993), Pennsylvania state representative from the 17th district (1979–1982)
- Bill Peduto, former mayor of Pittsburgh (2014–2022), Pittsburgh City Councilor from the 8th district (2002–2014)

Labor unions

- International Association of Bridge, Structural, Ornamental and Reinforcing Iron Workers-Local 3
- International Brotherhood of Boilermakers, Iron Ship Builders, Blacksmiths, Forgers and Helpers-Local 154
- International Brotherhood of Electrical Workers-Local 5
- Laborers' District Council of Western PA
- Sheet Metal Workers' International Association
- United Association – Local 27
- United Steel Workers – District 10

Organizations

- AIPAC PAC
- Allegheny County Democratic Party
- Democratic Majority for Israel
- Jewish Democratic Council of America
- Pro-Israel America
Summer Lee

U.S. senators

- Bernie Sanders, U.S. senator from Vermont (2007–present)
- Elizabeth Warren, U.S. senator from Massachusetts (2013–present)

U.S. representatives

- Cori Bush, U.S. representative from Missouri's 1st congressional district (2021–2025)
- Pramila Jayapal, U.S. representative from Washington's 7th congressional district (2017–present)
- Ro Khanna, U.S. representative from California's 17th congressional district (2017–present)
- Andy Levin, U.S. representative from Michigan's 9th congressional district (2019–2023)
- Alexandria Ocasio-Cortez, U.S. representative from New York's 14th congressional district (2019–present)
- Ilhan Omar, U.S. representative from Minnesota's 5th congressional district (2019–present)
- Mark Pocan, U.S. representative from Wisconsin's 2nd congressional district (2013–present)
- Ayanna Pressley, U.S. representative from Massachusetts's 7th congressional district (2019–present)
- Jan Schakowsky, U.S. representative from Illinois's 9th congressional district (1999–present)
- Rashida Tlaib, U.S. representative from Michigan's 13th congressional district (2019–present)

State legislators

- Joanna McClinton, minority leader of the Pennsylvania House of Representatives (2020–present), Pennsylvania state representative (2015–present)

Local officials

- Ed Gainey, mayor of Pittsburgh (2022–present), former member of the Pennsylvania House of Representatives from the 24th district (2013–2022)

Labor unions

- Pittsburgh Federation of Teachers
- SEIU-32BJ, Healthcare PA, Local #688, PA State Council
- United Electrical Workers Local #610
- United Food and Commercial Workers Local 1776

Political parties

- Working Families Party

Organizations

- Congressional Progressive Caucus
- Democracy for America
- EMILY's List
- End Citizens United
- J Street (co-endorsement with Dickinson)
- Justice Democrats
- League of Conservation Voters
- NARAL Pro-Choice America
- Our Revolution
- Progressive Change Campaign Committee
- Progressive Democrats of America
- Sierra Club
- Stonewall Democrats – Pittsburgh chapter
- Sunrise Movement

==== Debates and forums ====
2022 PA-12 Democratic primary debates and forums
No.	Date	Host	Moderator	Link	Participants				
P Participant A Absent N Non-invitee I Invitee W Withdrawn									
P Participant A Absent N Non-invitee I Invitee W Withdrawn					Dickinson	Irwin	Lee	Parker	Woodard
1	May 10, 2022	Pittsburgh's Action News 4	Shannon Perrine	YouTube	P	P	P	P	P

==== Polling ====
Poll source	Date(s) administered	Sample size	Margin of error	Jerry Dickinson	Steve Irwin	Summer Lee	Will Parker	Jeff Woodard	Undecided
Mercury Public Affairs (D)	Late April 2022	500 (LV)	± 4.4%	–	30%	29%	–	–	–
GQR Research (D) (Note: Poll sponsored by EMILY's List, which supports Lee)	March 26–31, 2022	400 (LV)	± 4.9%	7%	13%	38%	0%	2%	40%

==== Results ====
Democratic primary results
Party	Candidate	Votes	%
Democratic	Summer Lee	48,002	41.9
Democratic	Steve Irwin	47,014	41.0
Democratic	Jerry Dickinson	12,440	10.9
Democratic	Jeff Woodard	5,454	4.8
Democratic	William Parker	1,670	1.5
Total votes		114,580	100.0

=== Republican primary ===
==== Candidates ====
===== Nominee =====
- Mike Doyle, Plum city councilor (no relation to Democratic incumbent Mike Doyle)

==== Results ====
Republican primary results
Party	Candidate	Votes	%
Republican	Mike Doyle	Unopposed	
Total votes		39,531	100.0

=== General election ===
==== Predictions ====
Source	Ranking	As of
The Cook Political Report	Likely D	June 28, 2022
Inside Elections	Likely D	November 3, 2022
Sabato's Crystal Ball	Likely D	October 19, 2022
Politico	Lean D	November 3, 2022
RCP	Lean D	November 1, 2022
Fox News	Likely D	October 11, 2022
DDHQ	Likely D	October 28, 2022
538	Solid D	October 27, 2022
The Economist	Safe D	November 5, 2022

==== Post-primary endorsements ====
Summer Lee (D)

U.S. executive branch officials

- Barack Obama, 44th president of the United States (2009–2017)

U.S. representatives

- Mike Doyle, U.S. representative from Pennsylvania's 18th congressional district (1995–2003, 2019–2022) Pennsylvania's 14th congressional district (2003–2019) (endorsed Steve Irwin in the primaries)

==== Polling ====
Poll source	Date(s) administered	Sample size	Margin of error	Summer Lee (D)	Mike Doyle (R)	Undecided
DCCC Targeting and Analytics Department (D) (Note: This poll was conducted in-house by and for the DCCC)	October 30–31, 2022	785 (LV)	± 3.5%	54%	40%	6%
Summer Lee Internal Poll (D)	October 2022	–	–	44%	40%	16%

==== Results ====
2022 Pennsylvania's 12th congressional district election
Party	Candidate	Votes	%
Democratic	Summer Lee	184,674	56.2
Republican	Mike Doyle	143,946	43.8
Total votes		328,620	100.0
Democratic hold			

== District 13 ==
2022 Pennsylvania's 13th congressional district election
- November 8, 2022
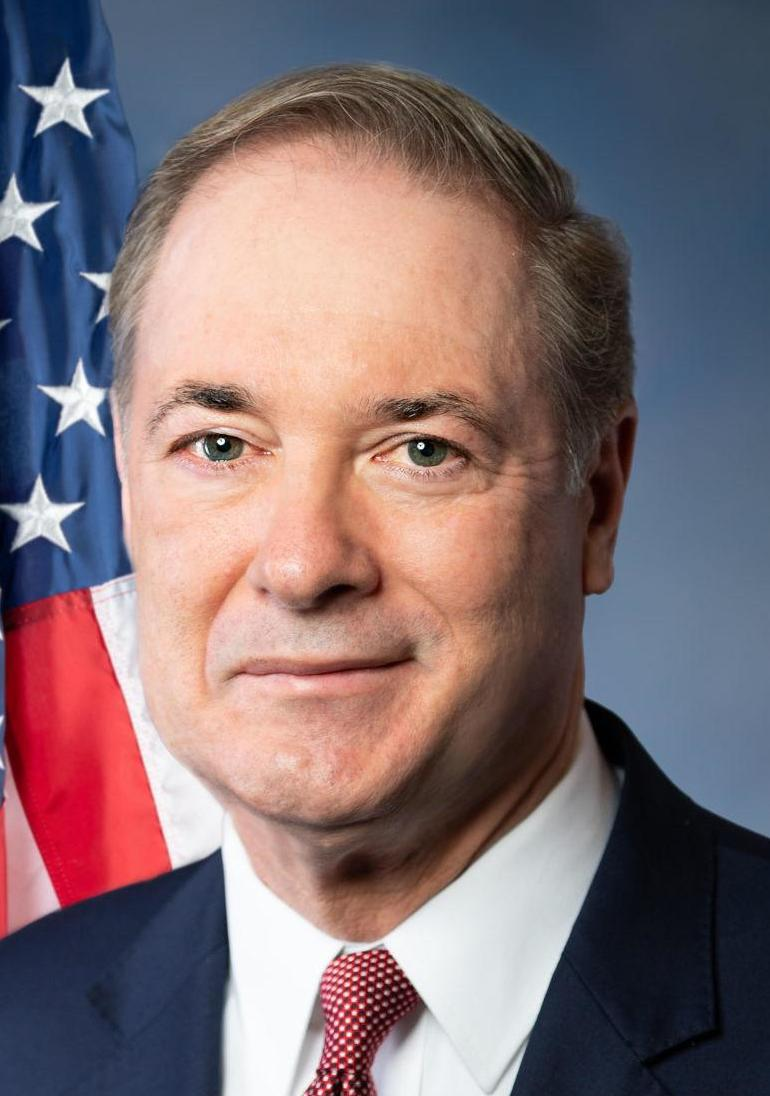
Nominee	John Joyce
Party	Republican
Popular vote	260,345
Percentage	100.0
- County results Joyce: >90%
U.S. Representative before election
John Joyce
Republican
Elected U.S. Representative
John Joyce
Republican

The 13th district is based in South Central Pennsylvania, including Johnstown, Altoona, and Gettysburg. The district was mostly unchanged by redistricting, though it did lose its territory in Somerset and Westmoreland counties in exchange for Johnstown. The district had a PVI of R+25, and voted for Donald Trump by 45 points in 2020. Republican John Joyce, who had represented the district since 2019, was most recently re-elected in 2022 after being unopposed in the primary and general elections.

=== Republican primary ===
==== Candidates ====
===== Nominee =====
- John Joyce, incumbent U.S. representative

==== Results ====
Republican primary results
Party	Candidate	Votes	%
Republican	John Joyce (incumbent)	Unopposed	
Total votes		114,160	100.0

=== Democratic primary ===
==== Candidates ====
===== Declined =====
- Mark Critz, western region director of the Pennsylvania Department of Agriculture and former U.S. representative from Pennsylvania's 12th congressional district (2010–2013) (won nomination via write-in, but declined to run)

==== Results ====
Democratic primary results
Party	Candidate	Votes	%
Democratic	Mark Critz (write-in)	967	100.0
Total votes		967	100.0

=== General election ===
==== Predictions ====
Source	Ranking	As of
The Cook Political Report	Solid R	February 23, 2022
Inside Elections	Solid R	March 11, 2022
Sabato's Crystal Ball	Safe R	March 2, 2022
Politico	Solid R	April 5, 2022
RCP	Safe R	June 9, 2022
Fox News	Solid R	July 11, 2022
DDHQ	Solid R	July 20, 2022
538	Solid R	June 30, 2022
The Economist	Safe R	September 28, 2022

==== Results ====
2022 Pennsylvania's 13th congressional district election
Party	Candidate	Votes	%
Republican	John Joyce (incumbent)	Unopposed	
Total votes		260,345	100.0
Republican hold			

== District 14 ==
2022 Pennsylvania's 14th congressional district election
- November 8, 2022
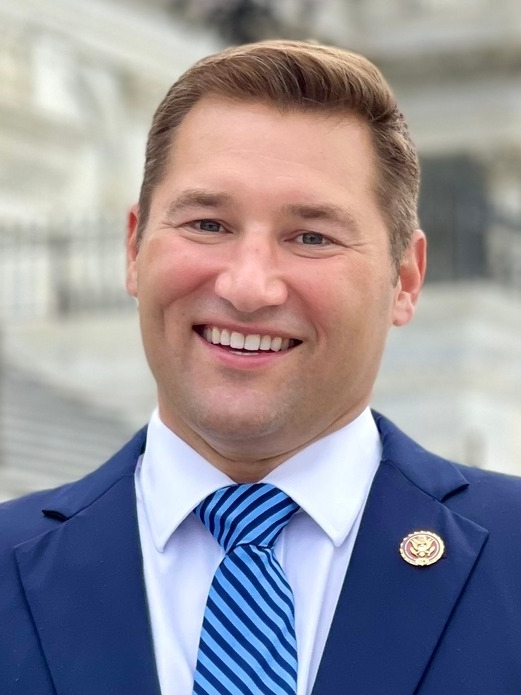
Nominee	Guy Reschenthaler
Party	Republican
Popular vote	230,865
Percentage	100.0%
- County results Reschenthaler: >90%
U.S. Representative before election
Guy Reschenthaler
Republican
Elected U.S. Representative
Guy Reschenthaler
Republican

The 14th district is based in Southwest Pennsylvania, including all of Washington, Greene, and Fayette counties, most of Indiana and Somerset counties, and parts of Westmoreland County. The district was mostly unchanged by redistricting, though it did have to expand eastward to take in more population. It had a PVI of R+18, and voted for Donald Trump by 32 points in 2020. Republican Guy Reschenthaler, who had represented the district since 2019, was most recently re-elected in 2022, having been unopposed in the primary and general elections.

=== Republican primary ===
==== Candidates ====
===== Nominee =====
- Guy Reschenthaler, incumbent U.S. representative

==== Endorsements ====
Guy Reschenthaler

U.S. executive branch officials

- Donald Trump, former president of the United States (2017–2021)

Organizations

- AIPAC PAC

==== Results ====
Republican primary results
Party	Candidate	Votes	%
Republican	Guy Reschenthaler (incumbent)	Unopposed	
Total votes		81,243	100.0

=== General election ===
==== Predictions ====
Source	Ranking	As of
The Cook Political Report	Solid R	February 23, 2022
Inside Elections	Solid R	March 11, 2022
Sabato's Crystal Ball	Safe R	March 2, 2022
Politico	Solid R	April 5, 2022
RCP	Safe R	June 9, 2022
Fox News	Solid R	July 11, 2022
DDHQ	Solid R	July 20, 2022
538	Solid R	June 30, 2022
The Economist	Safe R	September 28, 2022

==== Results ====
2022 Pennsylvania's 14th congressional district election
Party	Candidate	Votes	%
Republican	Guy Reschenthaler (incumbent)	Unopposed	
Total votes		230,865	100.0
Republican hold			

== District 15 ==
2022 Pennsylvania's 15th congressional district election
- November 8, 2022
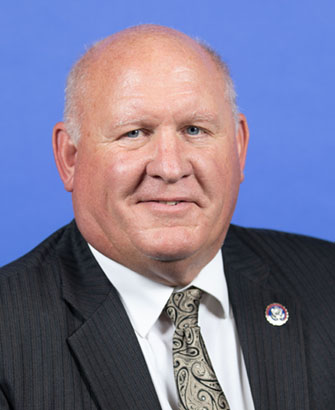

Nominee	Glenn Thompson	Mike Molesevich
Party	Republican	Democratic
Popular vote	213,417	91,729
Percentage	69.9%	30.1%
- County results Thompson: 50–60% 60–70% 70–80% 80–90%
U.S. Representative before election
Glenn Thompson
Republican
Elected U.S. Representative
Glenn Thompson
Republican

The 15th district is based in North Central Pennsylvania west of the Appalachian Divide, including State College, Lock Haven, and Bradford. The district was mostly unchanged by redistricting, though it did lose Johnstown in exchange for the parts of State College formerly in the 12th district. It had a PVI of R+20, and voted for Donald Trump by 37 points in 2020. Republican Glenn Thompson, who had represented the district since 2009, was most recently re-elected in 2022, receiving 69.9% of the vote.

=== Republican primary ===
==== Candidates ====
===== Nominee =====
- Glenn Thompson, incumbent U.S. representative

===== Declined =====
- Fred Keller, incumbent U.S. representative (filed to run in Pennsylvania's 9th congressional district, then announced retirement)

==== Endorsements ====
Glenn Thompson

Organizations

- AIPAC PAC
- National Rifle Association-Political Victory Fund

==== Results ====
Republican primary results
Party	Candidate	Votes	%
Republican	Glenn Thompson (incumbent)	Unopposed	
Total votes		99,270	100.0

=== Democratic primary ===
==== Nominee ====
- Mike Molesevich, former mayor of Lewisburg, environmental consultant, and Democratic nominee for Pennsylvania's 10th congressional district in 2016

=== General election ===
==== Predictions ====
Source	Ranking	As of
The Cook Political Report	Solid R	February 23, 2022
Inside Elections	Solid R	March 11, 2022
Sabato's Crystal Ball	Safe R	March 2, 2022
Politico	Solid R	April 5, 2022
RCP	Safe R	June 9, 2022
Fox News	Solid R	July 11, 2022
DDHQ	Solid R	July 20, 2022
538	Solid R	June 30, 2022
The Economist	Safe R	September 28, 2022

==== Results ====
2022 Pennsylvania's 15th congressional district election
Party	Candidate	Votes	%
Republican	Glenn Thompson (incumbent)	213,417	69.9
Democratic	Mike Molesevich	91,729	30.1
Total votes		305,146	100.0
Republican hold			

== District 16 ==
2022 Pennsylvania's 16th congressional district election
- November 8, 2022
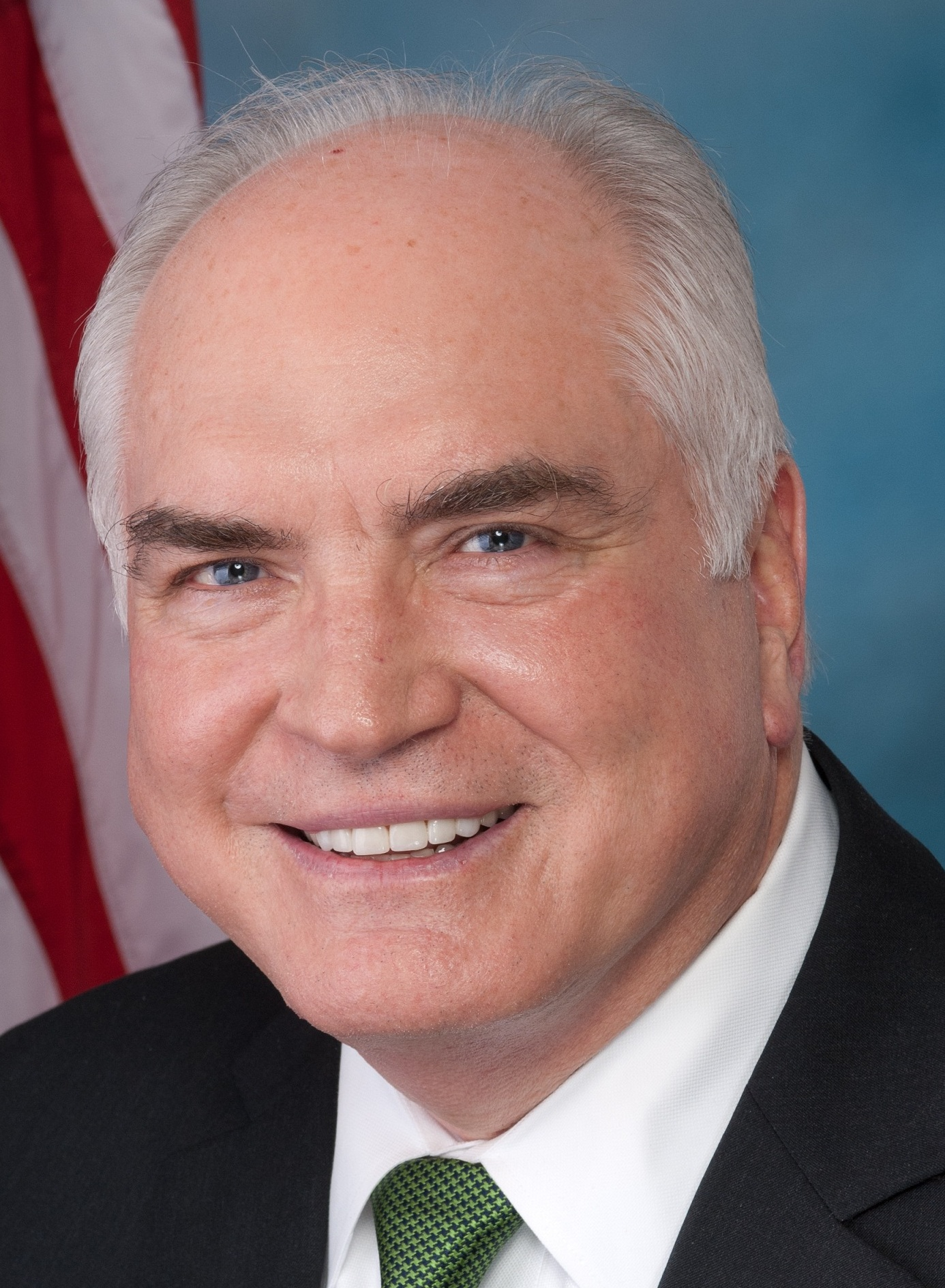

Nominee	Mike Kelly	Dan Pastore
Party	Republican	Democratic
Popular vote	190,546	130,443
Percentage	59.4%	40.6%
- County results Kelly: 60–70% Pastore 50–60%
U.S. Representative before election
Mike Kelly
Republican
Elected U.S. Representative
Mike Kelly
Republican

The 16th district is based in Northwest Pennsylvania, including all of Erie, Crawford, Mercer, Lawrence, and Butler counties and parts of Venango County. The district was mostly unchanged by redistricting. It had a PVI of R+13, and voted for Donald Trump by 21 points in 2020. Republican Mike Kelly, who had represented the district since 2011, was most recently re-elected in 2022, winning 59.4% of the vote in the general election.

=== Republican primary ===
==== Candidates ====
===== Nominee =====
- Mike Kelly, incumbent U.S. representative

==== Endorsements ====
Mike Kelly

U.S. executive branch officials

- Donald Trump, former president of the United States (2017–2021)

Organizations

- AIPAC PAC

==== Results ====
Republican primary results
Party	Candidate	Votes	%
Republican	Mike Kelly (incumbent)	Unopposed	
Total votes		87,028	100.0

=== Democratic primary ===
==== Candidates ====
===== Nominee =====
- Dan Pastore, FishUSA founder

===== Eliminated in primary =====
- Rick Telesz, farmer

==== Endorsements ====
Dan Pastore

Organizations

- Sierra Club

==== Results ====
Democratic primary results
Party	Candidate	Votes	%
Democratic	Dan Pastore	44,262	69.1
Democratic	Rick Telesz	19,788	30.9
Total votes		64,050	100.0

=== General election ===
==== Predictions ====
Source	Ranking	As of
The Cook Political Report	Solid R	February 23, 2022
Inside Elections	Solid R	March 11, 2022
Sabato's Crystal Ball	Safe R	March 2, 2022
Politico	Solid R	April 5, 2022
RCP	Safe R	June 9, 2022
Fox News	Solid R	July 11, 2022
DDHQ	Solid R	July 20, 2022
538	Solid R	June 30, 2022
The Economist	Safe R	September 28, 2022

==== Results ====
2022 Pennsylvania's 16th congressional district election
Party	Candidate	Votes	%
Republican	Mike Kelly (incumbent)	190,546	59.4
Democratic	Dan Pastore	130,443	40.6
Total votes		320,989	100.0
Republican hold			

== District 17 ==
2022 Pennsylvania's 17th congressional district election
- November 8, 2022
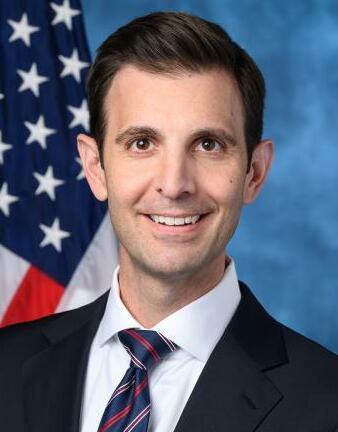

Nominee	Chris Deluzio	Jeremy Shaffer
Party	Democratic	Republican
Popular vote	193,615	169,013
Percentage	53.4%	46.6%
- Deluzio: 50–60% Shaffer: 50–60%
U.S. Representative before election
Conor Lamb
Democratic
Elected U.S. Representative
Chris Deluzio
Democratic

The 17th district is based in the western and northern suburbs of Pittsburgh, including parts of Allegheny County and all of Beaver County. The district was mostly unchanged by redistricting. It has an even PVI and voted for Joe Biden by 6 points in 2020. Democrat Conor Lamb, who represented the district since 2018, was re-elected in 2020 with 51.1% of the vote. He retired to run for the U.S. Senate in 2022. Lamb was succeeded by former Navy Officer Chris Deluzio, who was elected in 2022 by winning 53.4% of the vote in the general election.

=== Democratic primary ===
==== Candidates ====
===== Nominee =====
- Chris Deluzio, attorney and policy director of University of Pittsburgh Institute for Cyber Law, Policy and Security

===== Eliminated in primary =====
- Sean Meloy, senior political advisor for Victory Fund

===== Declined =====
- Conor Lamb, incumbent U.S. representative (ran for U.S. Senate)

==== Endorsements ====
Chris Deluzio

Organizations

- Allegheny County Democratic Party
- League of Conservation Voters
- New Politics
- Sierra Club
- VoteVets.org
- Working Families Party

==== Forum ====
2022 Pennsylvania's 17th congressional district democratic primary candidate forum
No.	Date	Host	Moderator	Link	Democratic	Democratic
Key: P Participant A Absent N Not invited I Invited W Withdrawn						
Key: P Participant A Absent N Not invited I Invited W Withdrawn					Chris Deluzio	Sean Meloy
1	Apr. 23, 2022	League of Women Voters of Great Pittsburgh; Robert Morris University	Kristen Davis		P	P

==== Results ====
Democratic primary results
Party	Candidate	Votes	%
Democratic	Chris Deluzio	62,389	63.6
Democratic	Sean Meloy	35,638	36.4
Total votes		98,027	100.0

=== Republican primary ===
==== Candidates ====
===== Nominee =====
- Jeremy Shaffer, former Ross Township commissioner and nominee for State Senate District 38 in 2018

===== Eliminated in primary =====
- Kathy Coder, political activist and 2018 lieutenant gubernatorial candidate
- Jason Killmeyer, conservative writer and national security expert

===== Did not appear on ballot =====
- Tricia Staible, manufacturing company president

===== Declined =====
- Sam DeMarco, Allegheny County at-large councilor and chair of the Allegheny County Republican Party

==== Forum ====
2022 Pennsylvania's 17th congressional district republican primary candidate forum
No.	Date	Host	Moderator	Link	Republican	Republican	Republican
Key: P Participant A Absent N Not invited I Invited W Withdrawn							
Key: P Participant A Absent N Not invited I Invited W Withdrawn					Kathy Coder	Jason Killmeyer	Jeremy Shaffer
1	Apr. 23, 2022	League of Women Voters of Great Pittsburgh; Robert Morris University	Kristen Davis		P	P	A

==== Results ====
Republican primary results
Party	Candidate	Votes	%
Republican	Jeremy Shaffer	40,965	58.7
Republican	Jason Killmeyer	16,801	24.0
Republican	Kathy Coder	12,079	17.3
Total votes		69,845	100.0

=== General election ===
==== Debate ====
2022 Pennsylvania's 17th congressional district debate
No.	Date	Host	Moderator	Link	Democratic	Republican
Key: P Participant A Absent N Not invited I Invited W Withdrawn						
Key: P Participant A Absent N Not invited I Invited W Withdrawn					Chris Deluzio	Jeremy Shaffer
1	Nov. 2, 2022	KDKA-TV	Ken Rice		P	P

==== Endorsements ====
Chris Deluzio (D)

U.S. executive branch officials

- Barack Obama, 44th president of the United States (2009–2017)

Statewide officials

- John Fetterman, lieutenant governor of Pennsylvania (2019–2023) and Democratic nominee for U.S. Senate in 2022

U.S. representatives

- Mike Doyle, U.S. representative from Pennsylvania's 18th congressional district (1995–2003, 2019–2022), Pennsylvania's 14th congressional district (2003–2019)
Jeremy Shaffer (R)

U.S. representatives

- Kevin McCarthy, House Minority Leader (2019–2023) and U.S. representative from California's 23rd congressional district (2013–2023), California's 22nd congressional district (2007–2013)

Organizations

- United States Chamber of Commerce

==== Predictions ====
Source	Ranking	As of
The Cook Political Report	Tossup	February 23, 2022
Inside Elections	Tossup	August 25, 2022
Sabato's Crystal Ball	Lean R (flip)	November 7, 2022
Politico	Tossup	April 5, 2022
RCP	Lean R (flip)	October 21, 2022
Fox News	Lean R (flip)	November 1, 2022
DDHQ	Lean R (flip)	October 31, 2022
538	Tossup	October 25, 2022
The Economist	Tossup	November 1, 2022

==== Polling ====
Poll source	Date(s) administered	Sample size	Margin of error	Chris Deluzio (D)	Jeremy Shaffer (R)	Undecided
Brilliant Corners Research & Strategies (D) (Note: This poll was sponsored by the DCCC Targeting and Analytics Department)	September 18–20, 2022	400 (LV)	± 4.9%	49%	43%	8%
Lake Research Partners (D) (Note: This poll was sponsored by Deluzio's campaign)	July 18–21, 2022	400 (LV)	± 4.9%	43%	42%	15%
RMG Research	June 4–6, 2022	500 (LV)	± 4.5%	44%	44%	12%
DCCC Targeting and Analytics Department (D)	May 9–10, 2022	494 (LV)	± 4.4%	44%	41%	16%

Hypothetical polling

Generic Democrat vs. generic Republican

Poll source	Date(s) administered	Sample size	Margin of error	Generic Democrat	Generic Republican	Undecided
Change Research (D) (Note: This poll was sponsored by the House Majority PAC)	October 19, 2022	–	–	45%	44%	11%

==== Results ====
2022 Pennsylvania's 17th congressional district election
Party	Candidate	Votes	%
Democratic	Chris Deluzio	193,615	53.4
Republican	Jeremy Shaffer	169,013	46.6
Total votes		362,628	100.0
Democratic hold			

== Notes ==
Partisan clients
