= Steve Irwin (attorney) =

Pennsylvania politician (born 1959)

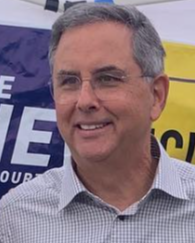
- Irwin in 2021

Chair of the Pennsylvania Advisory Committee of the U.S. Commission on Civil Rights
- Incumbent
- Assumed office March 2019

Banking & Securities Commissioner of Pennsylvania
- In office October 2006 – April 2014
- Governor: Ed Rendell; Tom Corbett
- Succeeded by: James R. Biery

Personal details
- Born: Steven Dane Irwin; July 1, 1959 (age 67) Brooklyn, New York, U.S.
- Party: Democratic
- Children: 3
- Education: Harvard University (BA); Georgetown University (JD)

Steven Dane Irwin (born July 1, 1959) is an American lawyer, activist, and politician who is the chair of the Pennsylvania Advisory Committee of the U.S. Commission on Civil Rights and previously was the Banking and Securities Commissioner of Pennsylvania.

A member of the Democratic Party, Irwin ran for Congress in 2022, but was defeated by State Representative Summer Lee in the primary.

== Early life ==
Irwin spent his early childhood in Queens, New York, and moved to St. Petersburg, Florida, when he was 10. His father, a Korean War veteran, worked as a butcher and his mother worked as a secretary to a rabbi. He attended Harvard University, on a scholarship, and went on to attend Georgetown Law School. At Georgetown Law, Irwin wrote for three of the school's law journals.

== Career ==
Irwin worked as a legislative aide for Senator Arlen Specter from 1982 to 1986. While working for Specter, Irwin took a leading role in helping to establish the Pittsburgh Light Rail and the Martin Luther King Jr. East Busway. Following his work with Specter, Irwin moved to Pittsburgh, to live with his wife, a Pittsburgh-native. His first job in Pittsburgh was clerking for judge Joseph F. Weis Jr., who served on the United States Court of Appeals for the Third Circuit.

Irwin is an attorney and litigates commercial, employment and regulatory cases. He serves as counsel for the Healthcare Council of Western Pennsylvania, Pittsburgh Zoo and PPG Aquarium.

In 2006, Irwin was nominated to the position of Banking Commissioner of Pennsylvania, by Governor Ed Rendell and he was confirmed by the Pennsylvania Senate. Irwin served in this position, during the Rendell and Corbett administrations before Corbett, a Republican, removed him from the position in 2014. In this position, Irwin oversaw state investment regulations and fought financial fraud. He worked closely with the North American Securities Administrators Association to translate the Dodd-Frank Act to the state level.

Irwin has long been an active member of the Allegheny County Democratic Committee and was the campaign manager four times for the Democratic nominees running for Attorney General of Pennsylvania.

=== 2022 congressional campaign ===
Irwin announced his candidacy for Pennsylvania's 12th congressional district in November 2021. Congressman Mike Doyle had previously announced his retirement and went on to endorse Irwin's candidacy in March 2022. Irwin's candidacy was also endorsed by former Pittsburgh Mayor Bill Peduto, Rendell and Democratic Majority for Israel.

The initial votes, which were primarily mail-in ballots, favored Irwin and he held a commanding lead on much of election night. However, his lead shrank when in-person votes were tabulated and he lost to state representative Summer Lee by fewer than 750 votes.

== Personal life ==
Irwin is married to Andi, an artist, and has three children. He is an avid musician and plays the accordion. Irwin also serves as the host of the Pittsburgh political show, "Political Jungle" that airs on PCTV.

One of the only Jews in St. Petersburg, he was often bullied and his house was egged because he was Jewish. He is a former member of the synagogue, Tree of Life – Or L'Simcha Congregation where there was a mass shooting in 2018. Irwin personally knew about half of the 11 shooting victims.

Irwin is on the Anti-Defamation League's Midwest regional board and previously was an ADL National Commissioner.
