= A. William Schenck =

American politician

A. William Schenck III is a former Secretary of the Pennsylvania Department of Banking. He currently serves on the Pennsylvania Higher Education Assistance Agency Board.
