= Alexandra Hunt =

American politician and researcher

- Born: c. 1993 (age 32–33); Rochester, New York, U.S.
- Education: University of Richmond (BS); Drexel University (MS); Temple University (MPH)
- Political party: Democratic
- Website: Official website

Alexandra M. Hunt (born c. 1993) is an American political candidate, public health worker, published research scientist, and activist from Pennsylvania. She is a member of the Democratic Party. Hunt has run to represent Pennsylvania's 3rd congressional district in the United States House of Representatives and to serve as city controller of Philadelphia.

== Early life and career ==
Hunt is from Rochester, New York. She had attended the private school Allendale Columbia school in the suburbs, where both of her parents worked as teachers. She has a twin brother. Her twin brother struggled with a learning disability. She moved out of her mother's house while still in high school. Hunt attended the University of Richmond; she worked her way through college by working as a server and a stripper. She completed her Bachelor of Science in psychology in 2014.

After graduating from Richmond, Hunt moved to Philadelphia, where she earned a Master of Science in interdisciplinary health sciences at Drexel University and a Master of Public Health from Temple University. During Hunt's time at Drexel University, she contributed to a group project in college researching HSV-1 (herpes simplex virus type 1) activating the DNA damage response, and assisted on a group college research project with her classmates on oxygen exposure during cardiopulmonary resuscitation in a preclinical trial at Children's Hospital of Philadelphia. Hunt said she rode as an emergency medical technician with Plymouth Meeting Ambulance Association. Alexandra also said she worked at Fox Chase Cancer Center in the clinical research department when the COVID-19 pandemic began and volunteered in the community at COVID-19 testing sites and distributing food and other necessities. During Hunt's time in clinical research, she said she published group college project research articles on psychological distress in patients with metastatic cancer, the use of the NCCN thermometer to measure the prevalence and correlates of psychological distress in cancer patients, and the feasibility of using food frequency questionnaire to assess dietary patterns in patients with advanced gastrointestinal malignancies.

== Political career ==
=== Congressional campaign ===
In February 2021, Hunt announced her candidacy for the United States House of Representatives in Pennsylvania's 3rd congressional district in the 2022 elections against incumbent Dwight Evans, who Hunt considers to be too moderate. Running as a progressive, Hunt supported the Green New Deal, Medicare for All, forgiving student loan debt, and repealing FOSTA-SESTA. During the campaign, she opened an OnlyFans account in response to an Internet troll who said he was looking forward to her setting up an account after she loses, saying that she did so to lessen the stigma around sex work. On top of Hunt facing backlash for sex work during her campaign, she also went through a cyberattack. This cyberattack affected Hunt's campaign site and her emailing system.

Though Hunt's past sex work was highlighted during her campaign, specifically by The New York Times and many other outlets, she was endorsed by Gloria Steinem, a well-known feminist who started the National Women's Political Caucus. Hunt lost the nomination to Evans, receiving 20% of the vote while Evans received 76%. Hunt has continued to be an advocate for mental health and public health responses to gun violence.

=== Philadelphia controller campaign ===
Following Rebecca Rhynhart's resignation as Philadelphia city controller in order to run for mayor of Philadelphia, Hunt declared her candidacy in the 2023 special election to fill the position. She expressed support for paying reparations to Black people. She placed second in the primary election with 31% of the vote.

== Personal life ==
Hunt has coached youth soccer, but was asked to leave her position when parents found out about her past sex work. She had an abortion when she was 18 years old and claims to have survived domestic violence and two sexual assaults.

== Electoral history ==
2022 U.S. House of Representatives Democratic primary election, PA-03
Party	Candidate	Votes	%
Democratic	Dwight Evans	97,709	75.57
Democratic	Alexandra Hunt	25,712	19.89
Democratic	Michael Cogbill	5,728	4.43
Write-in		153	0.12
Total votes		129,302	100.00

2023 Philadelphia City Controller Democratic special primary election
Party	Candidate	Votes	%
Democratic	Christy Brady	86,884	46.11
Democratic	Alexandra Hunt	59,068	31.35
Democratic	John Thomas	42,292	22.45
Write-in		170	0.09
Total votes		188,414	100.00
