= Summer Lee =

American politician (born 1987)

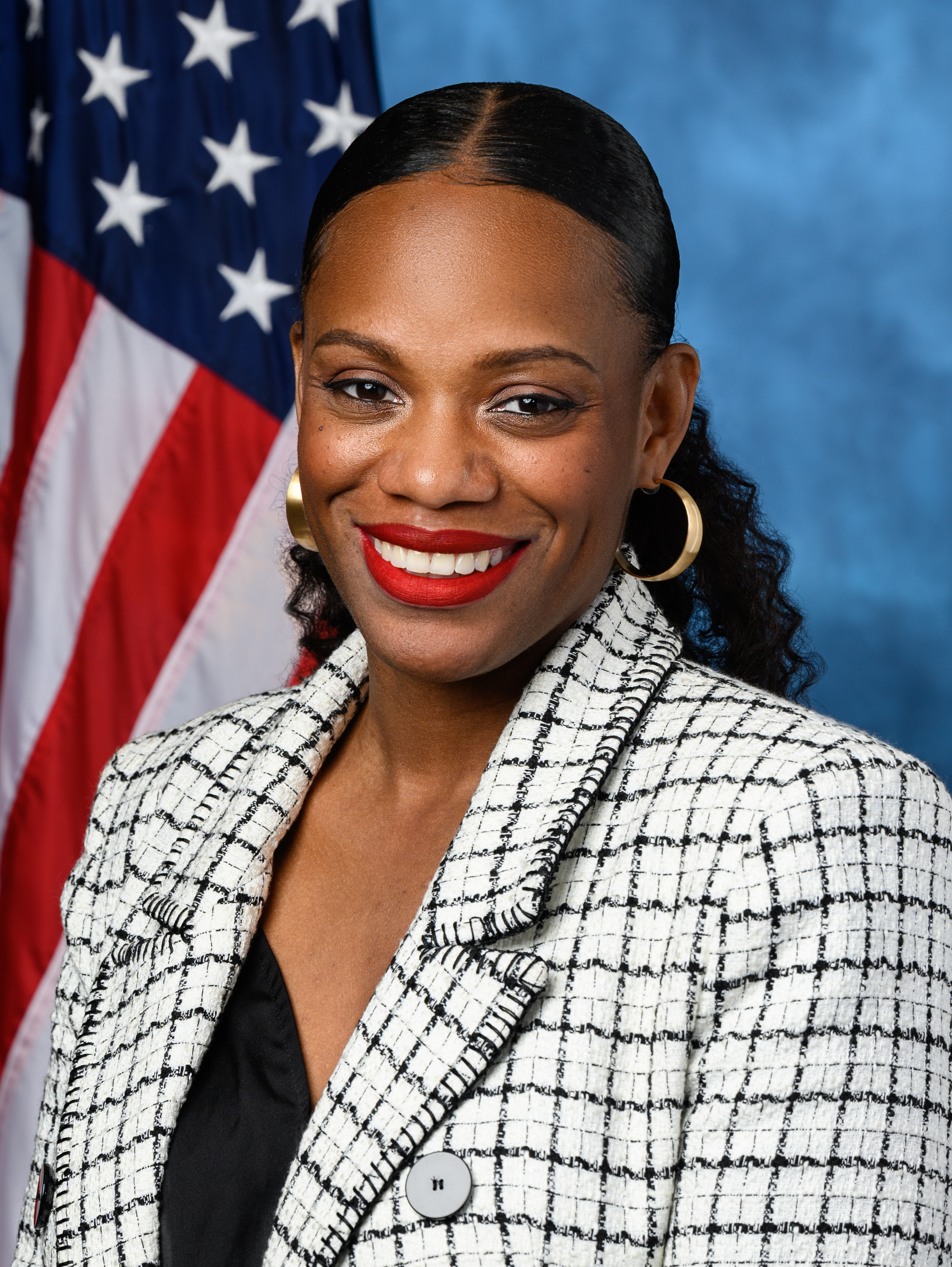
- Official portrait, 2022

Member of the U.S. House of Representatives from Pennsylvania's 12th district
- Incumbent
- Assumed office January 3, 2023
- Preceded by: Mike Doyle (redistricted)

Member of the Pennsylvania House of Representatives from the 34th district
- In office January 1, 2019 – December 7, 2022
- Preceded by: Paul Costa
- Succeeded by: Abigail Salisbury

Personal details
- Born: November 26, 1987 (age 38) North Braddock, Pennsylvania, U.S.
- Party: Democratic
- Other political affiliations: Working Families; Democratic Socialists of America (2018–2021)
- Education: Pennsylvania State University (BA); Howard University (JD)
- Website: House website Campaign website
- Lee's voice Lee on the Pittsburgh synagogue shooting following the gunman's conviction in federal court. Recorded June 21, 2023

Summer Lynn Lee (born November 26, 1987) is an American politician and social activist serving as the U.S. representative for Pennsylvania's 12th congressional district since 2023. She is a member of the Democratic Party. Her district includes Pittsburgh, much of southern and eastern Allegheny County, and part of western Westmoreland County. After winning the 2022 congressional primary and the general election, Lee became the first Black woman to represent Pennsylvania in Congress.

Lee was a Democratic member of the Pennsylvania House of Representatives for the 34th district from 2019 to 2022. She was the first Black woman to represent Southwestern Pennsylvania in the state legislature. Lee is a former member of the Democratic Socialists of America (DSA). The group supported her in her initial run for state office, but she departed after disagreements with the organization's Pittsburgh chapter. She is considered a member of "The Squad", a small group of young left-wing Democrats in the U.S. House of Representatives.

== Early life and education ==
Lee was raised in North Braddock, Pennsylvania, and attended Woodland Hills High School. She graduated with a Bachelor of Arts in journalism, with minors in international studies and French from Pennsylvania State University in 2009 and earned a Juris Doctor from the Howard University School of Law in 2015. She campaigned for Bernie Sanders in the 2016 Democratic primaries after graduating.

== Pennsylvania House of Representatives (2019–2022) ==
Lee challenged incumbent representative Paul Costa in the Democratic primary for the 34th district in 2018. An organizer from Pittsburgh's DSA chapter approached her about running after she led a successful write-in campaign for a school board candidate. She defeated Costa, 67.8% to 32.2%, attributing her victory to grassroots campaigning. She was unopposed in the general election.

During the 2020 Democratic Party presidential primaries, Lee endorsed Sanders.

=== Committee assignments ===
- Education
- Health
- Judiciary

== U.S. House of Representatives (2022–present) ==
=== Elections ===
==== 2022 ====
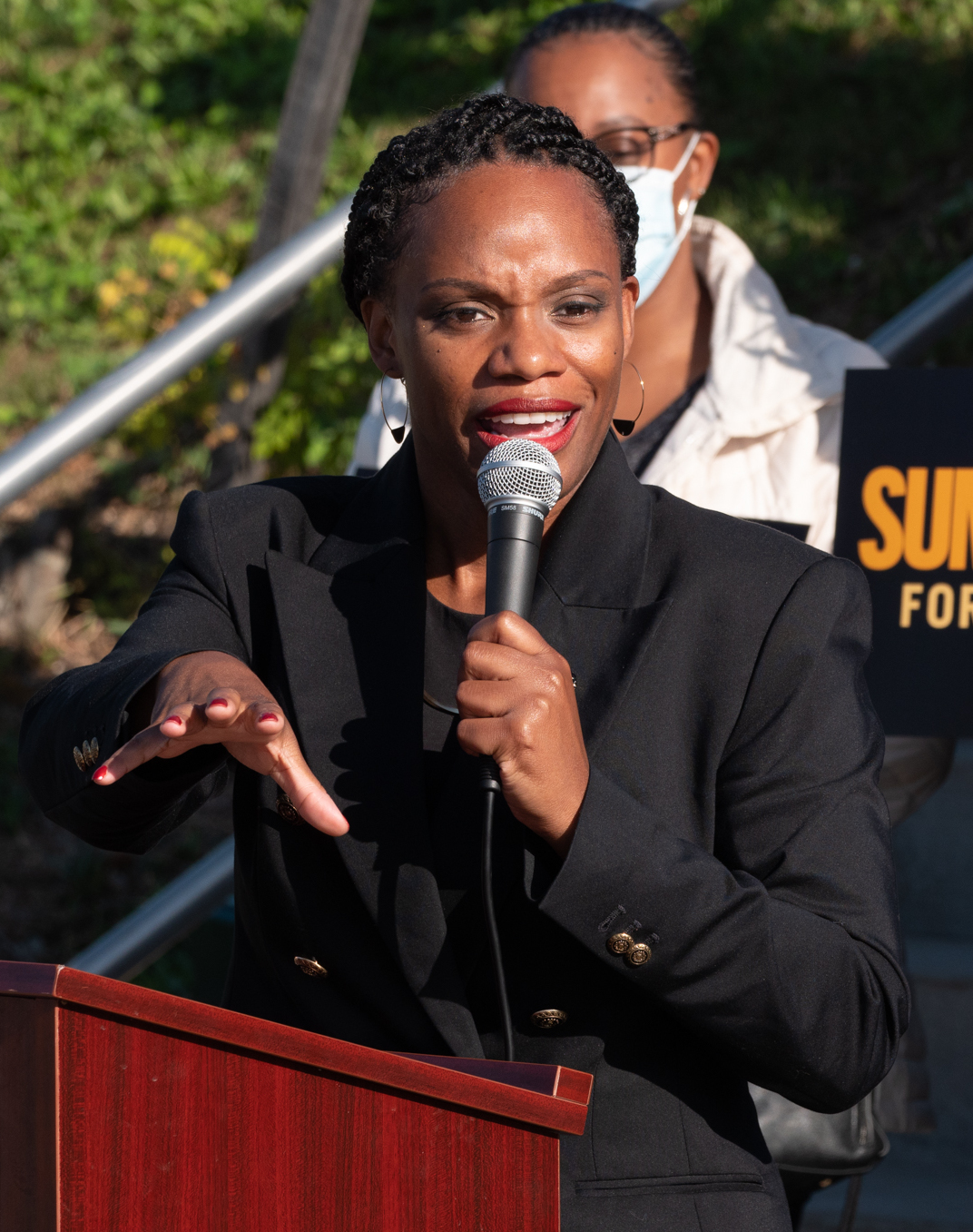
Lee announcing her congressional campaign

In October 2021, Lee announced her candidacy for Pennsylvania's 18th congressional district after the incumbent representative, Mike Doyle, announced his retirement. After Pennsylvania's new congressional districts were chosen in February 2022, most of the old 18th district, including Pittsburgh as well as parts of the Mon Valley and Westmoreland County, became the 12th district, and Lee announced she would run there.

Lee won the Democratic primary election on May 17, 2022, defeating rival Steve Irwin. Though Irwin had an early lead on election night with early and mail-in ballots, Lee emerged with a victory of around 740 votes once in-person Election Day votes were counted. She won the Allegheny County portion of the district by almost 4,500 votes. Most networks had declared Lee the winner by May 20, and Irwin conceded that day.

In the November 8 general election, Lee defeated Republican Mike Doyle (no relation to the Democratic incumbent).

Lee simultaneously ran for reelection to the Pennsylvania House of Representatives; she was reelected to a third term with little opposition, but was required to resign the seat to assume her new role in the U.S. House, which she did on December 7, 2022. With elections in the 32nd district, where incumbent Tony DeLuca died in October 2022 but was reelected posthumously to a 21st term, and the 35th district, where incumbent Austin Davis was simultaneously reelected to a third full term and elected lieutenant governor of Pennsylvania, an unusual situation arose in which the Democratic Party gained control of the chamber, having won 102 seats to the Republican Party's 101 in the 2022 elections, but would begin the new legislative term with just 99 members, due to these three vacancies in solidly Democratic districts in Allegheny County.

==== 2024 ====
In 2024, Lee faced a primary challenge from Edgewood councilwoman Bhavini Patel, who ran towards the political center compared to Lee. Amid concerns that her criticism of Israel could cost her renomination in a district with a significant Jewish population, Lee cultivated endorsements from prominent Democrats including House minority leader Hakeem Jeffries and Senator Bob Casey Jr. The race between Lee and Patel, who is pro-Israel, was seen as a bellwether for other primary races where pro-Israel candidates are challenging progressive, Israel-critical incumbents. Ultimately Lee defeated Patel but, unlike Lee, fellow progressive Israel critics Jamaal Bowman and Cori Bush were defeated for renomination by pro-Israel candidates who, unlike Patel, received backing from the pro-Israel AIPAC.

In the general election, Lee defeated Republican James Hayes, 56.4% to 43.6%, winning a second term.

==== 2026 ====
Lee faced William Parker, whom she had also defeated in the 2022 Democratic primary, in the May 2026 primary. She defeated Parker and advanced to the general election, where she is scheduled to face Republican James Hayes in a rematch of the 2024 election.

In June 2026, The Philadelphia Inquirer reported that Pennsylvania progressives had mentioned Lee as a potential candidate for the U.S. Senate in 2028. Later that month, a social-media post by Lee referring to 2028 prompted speculation about a possible Senate bid; Lee denied that the post contained any "innuendo" about a candidacy.

=== Tenure ===
In February 2026, Lee delivered the Working Families Party response to President Donald Trump's 2026 State of the Union Address.

==== Abortion ====
Lee supports abortion rights. Lee joined 40 other House Democrats in a letter calling on the Biden administration to use all means possible to preserve FDA approval for mifepristone and protect access to these treatments nationwide, in response to a ruling by Northern District of Texas judge Matthew J. Kacsmaryk.

==== Affirmative action ====
In response to the U.S. Supreme Court's decision in Students for Fair Admissions v. Harvard, which held that race-based affirmative action programs in college admissions processes violate the Equal Protection Clause of the Fourteenth Amendment, Lee stated that she was "disgusted that our country just enshrined racial inequity in higher education and economic immobility into law."

==== Economy ====
Lee was among the 46 Democrats who voted against final passage of the Fiscal Responsibility Act of 2023 in the House. She was the only no-vote among western Pennsylvania House members. She had previously decried Republicans' willingness to take the country "to the brink of economic catastrophe" to win budget concessions.

==== Gun control ====
On March 29, 2023, two Pittsburgh Catholic schools received what investigators deemed were hoax active shooter threats that prompted evacuations, lockdowns and large responses from police. This came two days after a highly publicized school shooting in Nashville. In response, Lee said that having to endure active shootings and related evacuations, drills and hoaxes is "no way for our kids to live," and blamed the proliferation of guns in America for causing the widespread panic of the fake active shooting reports.

On April 7, 2023, Lee harshly criticized the Tennessee House's expulsion of Democratic representatives Justin Pearson and Justin Jones. The lawmakers were expelled after joining a protest against mass shootings on the Tennessee house floor. Her criticism was also aimed at Republicans' overall approach to gun control, saying "people are dying because Republicans want to put politics over the lives of the people they represent. They ask for safety for themselves, but not for school children, and they'll sacrifice the lives of our loved ones for their lobbyists."

==== Immigration and Customs Enforcement ====
In a June 2026 public statement in response to the death of Daphy Michel, a Haitian asylum seeker who found unconscious and later pronounced dead two days after being dropped off at a bus stop by United States Immigration and Customs Enforcement officers and whose death was ruled a homicide, Lee expressed support for abolishing ICE.

==== Infrastructure ====
After a Norfolk Southern train derailed in Pittsburgh on April 8, 2023, Lee called for more accountability from railroads, and protection from so-called "bomb trains" that carry hazardous materials through populated areas. This was two months after a train derailment in East Palestine, Ohio, which also involved a Norfolk Southern train. In response to these events, Lee publicly supported multiple bills in Congress that look to enforce strict regulations on the rail industry. She is an original co-sponsor of the DERAIL Act, which would put stricter federal rail safety regulations in place that were rolled back during the Trump administration.

==== Iran ====
Lee and other progressive Democrats voted against a resolution condemning Iran's aerial attack on Israel in April. She also voted against an embargo on sending American technology to Iran and a resolution requesting the European Union designate Iran's Islamic Revolutionary Guard Corps as a terrorist organization.

==== Israel and Palestine ====
On April 4, 2023, Lee joined Senator Bernie Sanders, and at least nine House Democrats, in signing a letter to President Joe Biden and Secretary of State Antony Blinken expressing concern over rising violence between Israelis and Palestinians and the new Israeli government's attempt to weaken the country's independent judiciary.

On April 25, 2023, Lee was one of 19 representatives (18 Democrats and 1 Republican) to vote against House Resolution 311, a resolution honoring America's relationship with Israel on the 75th anniversary of its independence and encouraging the expansion and strengthening of the Abraham Accords.

On May 5, 2023, Lee was one of 17 cosponsors of the "Defending the Human Rights of Palestinian Children and Families Living Under Israeli Military Occupation Act," which "prohibits U.S. taxpayer funding to the Government of Israel from being used for the military detention, abuse, or ill-treatment of Palestinian children in Israeli military detention."

On June 13, 2023, Lee was one of 13 representatives (eleven Democrats and two Republicans) who voted against a bill mandating the Biden administration appoint a special envoy for the Abraham Accords.

On July 18, 2023, she, along with eight other Progressive Democrats (Alexandria Ocasio-Cortez, Cori Bush, Jamaal Bowman, André Carson, Ilhan Omar, Ayanna Pressley, Delia Ramirez, and Rashida Tlaib), voted against a non-binding resolution proposed by August Pfluger which states that "the State of Israel is not a racist or apartheid state", that Congress rejects "all forms of antisemitism and xenophobia" and that "the United States will always be a staunch partner and supporter of Israel." In a tweet, Congresswoman Lee wrote, "I reject antisemitism and xenophobia in all its forms. Whether we're talking about India, Israel, or Sri Lanka, we are not true allies if we cannot push our partners to uphold basic human rights & democratic values."

On October 25, 2023, Lee and eight other progressive Democrats (Ocasio-Cortez, Bowman, Bush, Carson, Omar, Ramirez, Tlaib, and Al Green), along with Republican Thomas Massie, voted against a resolution supporting Israel in the wake of the 2023 Hamas attack on Israel. The resolution stated that the House of Representatives: "stands with Israel as it defends itself against the barbaric war launched by Hamas and other terrorists" and "reaffirms the United States' commitment to Israel's security"; the resolution passed by an overwhelming 412-10-6 margin. Lee has instead voiced support for a ceasefire in the wake of Israel's military campaign against Hamas, co-sponsoring an opposing resolution demanding a ceasefire in the conflict. She has condemned Hamas's attack. She has also accused Israel of war crimes. Lee voted against a foreign aid package for Israel.

==== Russia ====
Lee, along with nearly fifty other members of Congress, was barred from entering Russia on May 19, 2023.

==== Syria ====
In 2023, Lee was among 56 Democrats to vote in favor of H.Con.Res. 21, which directed President Joe Biden to remove U.S. troops from Syria within 180 days.

==== TikTok ====
In light of a potential ban on TikTok in the United States, Lee has supported the platform, calling it "an incredible organizing tactic." She voted against a bill that would force TikTok's parent company to sell the app or face a ban.

=== Caucus memberships ===
- Black Maternal Health Caucus
- Congressional Black Caucus
- Congressional Caucus for the Equal Rights Amendment (vice chair)
- Congressional Equality Caucus
- Congressional Progressive Caucus

=== Committee assignments ===
==== 119th Congress ====
- Committee on Education and the Workforce
  - Subcommittee on Early Childhood, Elementary, and Secondary Education
  - Subcommittee on Health, Employment, Labor, and Pensions
- Committee on the Judiciary
  - Subcommittee on Immigration Integrity, Security, and Enforcement
  - Subcommittee on the Constitution and Limited Government
- Committee on Oversight and Government Reform (until June 2026)

==== 118th Congress ====
- Committee on Oversight and Accountability
- Committee on Science, Space, and Technology

== Electoral history ==
=== 2018 ===
2018 Democratic primary for Pennsylvania State Representative District 34
Party	Candidate	Votes	%
Democratic	Summer Lee	6,914	67.77
Democratic	Paul Costa (incumbent)	3,288	32.23
Total votes		10,202	100

2018 General election Pennsylvania State Representative District 34
Party	Candidate	Votes	%
Democratic	Summer Lee	Unopposed	
Total votes		21,240	100.0%
Democratic hold			

=== 2020 ===
2020 Democratic primary for Pennsylvania State Representative District 34
Party	Candidate	Votes	%
Democratic	Summer Lee	11,863	76.36
Democratic	Christopher Roland	3,672	23.64
Total votes		15,535	100

2020 General election Pennsylvania State Representative District 34
Party	Candidate	Votes	%
Democratic	Summer Lee	Unopposed	
Total votes		27,129	100.0%
Democratic hold			

=== 2022 ===
2022 Democratic primary for U.S. Representative
Party	Candidate	Votes	%
Democratic	Summer Lee	48,002	41.9
Democratic	Steve Irwin	47,014	41.0
Democratic	Jerry Dickinson	12,440	10.9
Democratic	Jeff Woodard	5,454	4.8
Democratic	William Parker	1,670	1.5
Total votes		114,580	100

2022 Pennsylvania's 12th congressional district election
Party	Candidate	Votes	%
Democratic	Summer Lee	184,674	56.2
Republican	Mike Doyle (Note: No relationship to the Democratic incumbent)	143,946	43.8
Total votes		328,620	100
Democratic hold			

=== 2024 ===
2024 Pennsylvania's 12th Congressional District Democratic Primary
Party	Candidate	Votes	%
Democratic	Summer Lee	64,594	60.65
Democratic	Bhavini Patel	41,902	39.35
Total votes		106,496	100

Pennsylvania's 12th congressional district, 2024
Party	Candidate	Votes	%
Democratic	Summer Lee (incumbent)	234,802	56.4
Republican	James Hayes	181,426	43.6
Total votes		416,228	100.0

== Personal life ==
Lee lives in Swissvale, Pennsylvania. She has described herself as a first-generation college and law school graduate who was raised by a working-class single mother, and has spoken publicly about the burden of her student-loan debt.

During her first term in Congress, Lee shared a three-bedroom house with fellow representative Delia Ramirez within walking distance of their offices, a living arrangement the two said helped them manage Washington housing costs and navigate Congress together.

== See also ==
- List of African-American United States representatives
- List of Democratic Socialists of America who have held office in the United States
- Women in the United States House of Representatives

== Notes ==
U.S. House of Representatives
Preceded by Fred Keller	Member of the U.S. House of Representatives from Pennsylvania's 12th congressional district 2023–present	Incumbent
U.S. order of precedence (ceremonial)
Preceded by Laurel Lee	United States representatives by seniority 329th	Succeeded by Anna Paulina Luna
