= Pennsylvania Department of Banking and Securities =

Agency of the government of Pennsylvania

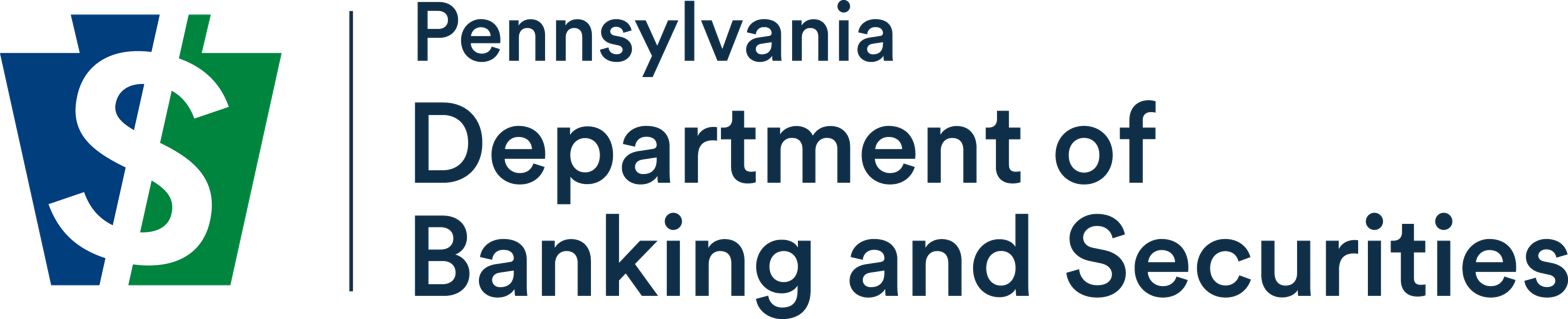

Agency overview
- Formed: June 8, 1891
- Jurisdiction: Government of Pennsylvania
- Headquarters: Market Square Plaza, Suite 1300; 17 North 2nd Street; Harrisburg, Pennsylvania; 40°15′37″N 76°52′57.5″W
- Employees: 174
- Annual budget: $20.8 million (FY 2010)
- Agency executive: Wendy S. Spicher, Secretary of the Department of Banking and Securities
- Website: dobs.pa.gov

The Pennsylvania Department of Banking and Securities is a cabinet-level agency in Pennsylvania.

== Organization ==
The Department is under the direction and control of a secretary of banking, who is appointed by the governor of Pennsylvania to serve as a member of the governor's cabinet. The secretary is assisted in managing the department by an executive deputy secretary of banking, a deputy secretary of banking for Depository Institutions and a deputy secretary of Banking for Non-Depository Institutions and Consumer Services.

== Responsibilities ==
The agency provides oversight of financial institutions and is charged with fostering economic growth while concurrently protecting consumers and investors. The bureau regulates the approximately 225 traditional banks that have received state charters, as well as over 14,000 non-bank lenders, including mortgage brokers, securities dealers, debt managers, and pawnshops. The department is fully funded by licensing fees and is not dependent upon tax revenue..

== See also ==
- List of Pennsylvania state agencies
