= Albert Wohlsen =

American politician (1919-2004)

Albert Bahlinger Wohlsen, Jr. (November 21, 1919 – January 12, 2004) was an American businessman and politician, who served as the interim Mayor of Lancaster, Pennsylvania, from 1979 to 1980. He was the mayor during the partial meltdown at the nearby Three Mile Island Nuclear Generating Station, which occurred only a few weeks into his term.

== Early life ==
Albert Bahlinger Wohlsen, Jr. was born in Lancaster, Pennsylvania, to Albert B. Wohlsen and Kathryne Sharpe Wohlsen. He was one of three children, along with sister Carolyn and brother Robert. Wohlsen graduated from the Franklin & Marshall Academy. He served in the United States Marine Corps, serving as a corporal with the 1st Marine Division in Guam and Tientsin, China during World War II.

Wohlsen was the president and chairman of the board of the Wohlsen Construction Company, a business established by his grandfather in 1890. He was chairman of the Mayor's Advisory Committee under Mayor Thomas J. Monaghan, who served two non-consecutive terms from 1958 to 1962 and 1966 and 1974, and under Mayor George Coe, who served between those two terms. Wohlsen served on the Lancaster architectural review board in the late 1960s and the Lancaster County Parks Board in the early 1970s. He received the Community Service Award from Lancaster Rotary Club in 1977.

== Mayor ==
Wohlsen was appointed interim mayor in 1979 after Mayor Richard M. Scott resigned to serve as adjutant general of Pennsylvania. Wohlsen was a Republican, and was one of several candidates, including Scott, that the state Republican Party had compelled to join the political arena from the private world during the early 1970s and 1980s. Wohlsen's first challenge as mayor was dealing with a major snowstorm that struck the city during his first day in office. Only a few weeks into his mayoral term, the 100-ton Three Mile Island Nuclear Generating Station experienced a partial meltdown. Despite his experience in the construction business, Wohlsen acknowledged he did not know enough about nuclear power to appreciate the seriousness of the accident. Nobody from Governor Dick Thornburgh's office attempted to communicate with Wohlsen or any Lancaster officials the day of the meltdown. Wohlsen considered and started to prepare the evacuation the city's 57,000 residents as a result of the meltdown, but ultimately did not. Other city officials encouraged him to order elderly residents of high-rises to travel to their families ahead of a general evacuation, but Wohlsen refused, concerned it would incite panic. Wohlsen himself declined to leave the city, claiming, "I felt it was my responsibility to stay here and see what happened. To be the last one to leave the ship."

Wohlsen was especially concerned that radioactive water would get into the Lancaster water supply. As a precaution, he had the Susquehanna River intake shut down, and relied on water from the Conestoga River. Wohlsen set up a phone line to field questions from the public. Upon realizing the Lancaster City Hall had no radio with which to monitor the news about Three Mile Island, Wohlsen went home and picked up a miniature reproduction of a horse-drawn fire engine, which included a built-in, battery-powered radio. Although Wohlsen himself described it as a "little, cheap radio", it served as the primary source to city officials for news about the accident for the next several months. During the meltdown, Thornburgh considered evacuating Harrisburg and Elizabethtown residents to Lancaster, where they would stay in dormitories at Franklin & Marshall and Millersville State colleges. Wohlsen argued against this proposal, worried it would create "utter chaos" for his city and residents.

Wohlsen spent many of the months following the meltdown involved in legal battles with Three Mile Island and presenting testimony before presidential and congressional committees. In a May 1979 letter to Thornburgh, Wohlsen voiced strong opposition to plans to discharge 600,000 gallons of treated radioactive water into the Susquehanna River. Wohlsen also testified before a U.S. Senate subcommittee on nuclear regulation in November 1979, where he complained that energy company Met-Ed, the owner of the plant, was "resistive to good, tough public review of the cleanup operations". The city later filed a lawsuit against the utility, which eventually led to a settlement that helped pay for radiation monitoring. Despite the Three Mile Island accident, Wohlsen refused for the rest of his life to condemn nuclear power.

Also during his tenure as mayor, Wohlsen formed the city's first mounted police unit, which was supported by donations from Lancaster County residents. He also denied a city church's application to demolish a historic structure on North Duke Street, and initiated the cleanup of the third block of East King Street. After 10 months as mayor, Wohlsen was succeeded by Arthur E. Morris. Wohlsen received several awards during his term as mayor. In 1979, he received the Lancaster Citizenship Award from the American Legion Post 34, an Appreciation of Services from the City of Lancaster, and a Recognition Award from Martin Luther King Jr. Memorial Committee. In 1980, he received the American Heritage Award from Lancaster Sertoma Club, the Distinguished Community Service Citation from Elizabethtown College, the Good Government Award from Lancaster Jaycees and the Toastmasters Communication Achievement Award. Also that year, he received civic awards from the Mount Horses No. 14, the Free & Accepted Masons and the M.W.P.H.G.L. of Pennsylvania.

== Post-mayor ==
In 1979, Wohlsen was named an honorary lifetime member of Boys Club of Lancaster. In 1983, he chaired a task force for the School District of Lancaster to study the idea of merit pay for outstanding teachers, and to look into the possibilities of offering math and science teachers higher-than-beginning step salaries to compete with business. Charlie Smithgall, who served as mayor from 1998 to 2006, said he often sought advice from Wohlsen during his tenure. In 1989, Wohlsen ran Republican candidate Mary Lou Broucht's unsuccessful campaign for Lancaster mayor. Wohlson died on January 12, 2004, at age 84.

== Personal life ==
Wohlsen married Katherine Bevis on January 29, 1939, a marriage that lasted for the rest of his life. They had two daughters, Barbara and Nancy. At the time of his death, he had four grandchildren and six great-grandsons. During his time as mayor, Wohlsen and his wife lived in a 1760 home, which had once been the residence of John Passmore, the first mayor of Lancaster. Wohlsen was a member of Grace Lutheran Church in Lancaster.

Political offices
Preceded by Richard M. Scott	Mayor of Lancaster, Pennsylvania; 1979–1980	Succeeded by Arthur E. Morris
