= Charlie Smithgall =

American politician and pharmacist (1945–2022)

41st Mayor of Lancaster, Pennsylvania
- In office January 1998 – January 3, 2006
- Preceded by: Janice Stork
- Succeeded by: Rick Gray

Personal details
- Born: September 20, 1945 Lancaster, Pennsylvania, U.S.
- Died: October 18, 2022 (aged 77) Lancaster, Pennsylvania, U.S.
- Party: Republican
- Education: Philadelphia College Of Pharmacy and Science
- Profession: Pharmacist, Politician

Charles W. Smithgall (September 20, 1945 – October 18, 2022) was an American politician, pharmacist, and businessman. Smithgall served as the mayor of Lancaster, Pennsylvania, for two terms from January 1998 until January 3, 2006. He is credited with spearheading several major infrastructure and redevelopment projects throughout Lancaster, including the conversion of the then-vacant Watt & Shand department store into the Lancaster County Convention Center and Marriott Hotel, as well as the construction of Clipper Magazine Stadium, the main Queen Street Station of the Red Rose Transit Authority, and Binns Park.

Smithgall, a Civil War re-enactor, was considered an expert on antique cannons and artillery. He acquired one of the largest private collections of cannons in the United States, including the single largest privately held collection of the artillery from the American Civil War. He worked as a consultant for a number of Civil War-era films and television series, including Gettysburg in 1993 and Lincoln in 2012.

== Biography ==
=== Early life and education ===
Smithgall was born in Lancaster and graduated from J. P. McCaskey High School in 1963. He received a Bachelor of Science degree in pharmacy from the Philadelphia College of Pharmacy and Science, which is now known as the University of the Sciences in Philadelphia, in 1968. Smithgall married his wife, Debbie Smithgall, in 1972. The couple had one daughter, Allison, who was born in 1979.

=== Career ===
Smithgall was the owner of Smithgalls' Pharmacy, a family business founded in 1916. The Smithgall family operated a second pharmacy in Lancaster on Columbia Avenue until the store's closure in 2008.

Prior to becoming mayor of Lancaster, Smithgall was a member of the Northwest Neighborhood Association, which opposed a proposed trolley linking downtown Lancaster with the Park City Center. He also served as a member of the Republican Committee of Lancaster County. Smithgall was elected Mayor of Lancaster in 1997 after his predecessor, two-term Democrat Janice Stork, declined to run for a third term. He defeated the Democratic candidate, Jon Lyons, by 52 to 36 percent of the total vote. Smithgall was sworn into office in January 1998.

Smithgall, a Republican, lost his re-election bid for a third term to Democrat Rick Gray in 2005. In 2009, Smithgall, who was not a candidate for mayor at the time, received 227 write-in votes in the mayoral primary election by supporters of the former mayor. After consideration following his write-in primary victory, Smithgall announced his intention to accept the Republican write-in nomination and seek a third term as mayor on June 26, 2009. Smithgall lost a bid for a third term in the 2009 mayoral election and the 2013 mayoral election.

=== Canons and artillery ===
An enthusiast of the American Civil War, Smithgall was a Civil War re-enactor from 1961. He worked as a consultant for several documentaries and films on the Civil War, including the 1993 movie, Gettysburg, in which he also appeared on screen as an artillery commander, and the former History Channel series, Civil War Journal. Smithgall collected antique cannons, and owned approximately 40 cannons as of 2009. During an on-air interview after the Independence Day Celebration in Lancaster's Long's Park on July 1, 2012, Smithgall stated that he had over seventy cannons in his collection including the very first cannon purchased by the United States government.

=== Death ===
Smithgall died of heart disease at Penn Medicine Lancaster General Hospital in Lancaster, Pennsylvania, on October 18, 2022, at age 77.

Political offices
Preceded by Janice Stork	Mayor of Lancaster, Pennsylvania; January 1998 – January 3, 2006	Succeeded by Rick Gray
