= 2025 Lancaster, Pennsylvania mayoral election =

Lancaster mayoral election, 2025
- November 4, 2025
Candidate	Jaime Arroyo	Tony Dastra
Party	Democratic	Green
Popular vote	9,086	1,137
Percentage	83.35%	10.43%
Mayor before election
Danene Sorace
Democratic
Elected mayor
Jaime Arroyo
Democratic

The 2025 mayoral election in Lancaster, Pennsylvania, was held on November 4, 2025, and resulted in the election of Democratic Party nominee Jaime Arroyo to his first term as mayor of Lancaster, the first Latino mayor of Lancaster.

== Background ==
Two-term incumbent mayor Danene Sorace, a Democrat, did not seek re-election.

== Campaign ==
The general election was contested by three candidates: Democratic nominee Jaime Arroyo, a member of the Lancaster City Council; Green Party nominee Tony Dastra, an employee of the Lancaster Township Public Works Department and candidate for mayor in 2017; and independent candidate J.S. "Woody" Chandler, a retired English teacher at McCaskey High School and U.S Navy veteran. Janet Diaz, another city council member, ran for the Democratic nomination, but lost to Arroyo after a social media post some considered racist or Islamophobic towards fellow city council member Ahmed Ahmed, who was running for reelection, and then missing a scheduled debate with Arroyo.

== Results ==
Mayor of Lancaster, 2025
Primary election
Party	Candidate	Votes	%
Democratic	Jaime Arroyo	3,710	83.48%
Democratic	Janet Diaz	710	15.98%
Democratic	Other	13	0.29%
	Write-ins	11	0.25%
Total votes		4,444	100.00%

Mayor of Lancaster, 2025 general election
Party	Candidate	Votes	%
Democratic	Jaime Arroyo	9,086	83.35%
Green	Tony Dastra	1,137	10.43%
Independent	J.S. "Woody" Chandler	572	5.25%
	Write-ins	106	0.97%
Total votes		10,901	100.00%
Democratic hold			

== See also ==
- 2025 United States elections
- List of mayors of Lancaster, Pennsylvania
