= 2026 Pennsylvania gubernatorial election =

- November 3, 2026
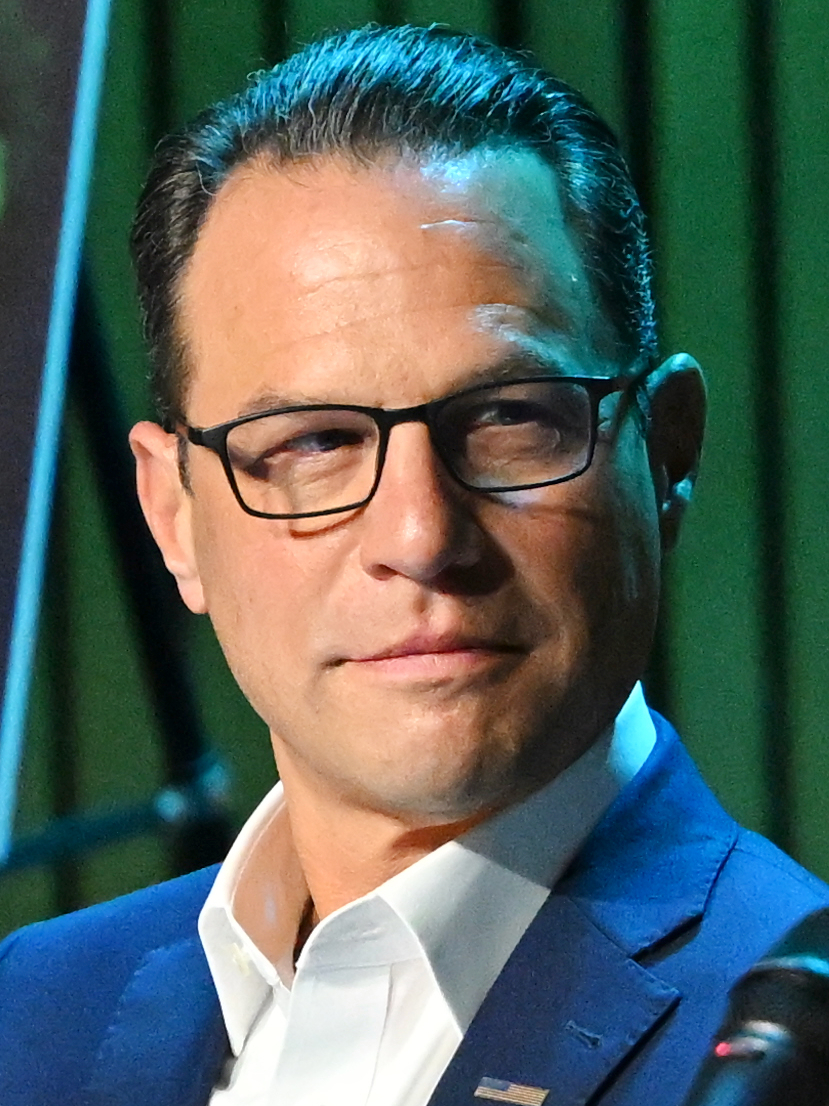

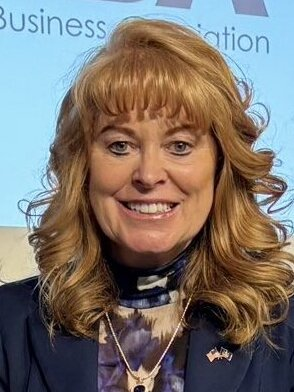
Nominee	Josh Shapiro	Stacy Garrity
Party	Democratic	Republican
Running mate	Austin Davis	Jason Richey
Popular vote	3,039,710	1,914,345
Percentage	60.56%	38.14%
- County results Shapiro: 50–60% 60–70% 70–80% 80–90% Garrity: 40–50% 50–60% 60–70% 70–80%
Governor before election
Josh Shapiro
Democratic
Elected Governor
Josh Shapiro
Democratic

The 2026 Pennsylvania gubernatorial election was held on November 3, 2026, to elect the governor of Pennsylvania. Democratic incumbent Josh Shapiro won a second term, defeating Republican state treasurer Stacy Garrity in a landslide.

Primary elections were held on May 19, 2026. Shapiro and Garrity secured their nominations unopposed. This was one of five Democratic-held governorships up for election in 2026 in a state that Donald Trump won in the 2024 presidential election.

Although Pennsylvania is one of the nation's most premier swing states at the federal level, the gubernatorial election was never considered in serious contention. Josh Shapiro won the governor's mansion by a very comfortable margin four years earlier, and was widely expected to repeat that performance in 2026. Polls consistently showed him leading by 20 points or more against his Republican challenger, which was reflected in the final results on election night.

== Background ==
Pennsylvania is a purple state located in the Northeastern United States. A part of the Rust Belt, it was narrowly won by Republican Donald Trump in his non-consecutive second victory in 2024 after similarly narrow victories by Democrat Joe Biden in 2020 and Trump in his first election in 2016.

The state has a Democratic and Republican senator, making it one of only three states to have a split Senate delegation, (Note: The other two are Maine, with an independent who caucuses with the Democrats and a Republican, and Wisconsin, with a Democrat and a Republican.) while Republicans hold a majority in the state's House delegation, with ten seats to the Democrats' seven. Democrats also control the Pennsylvania House of Representatives while Republicans control the Pennsylvania Senate.

Republicans have not won a Pennsylvania gubernatorial election since 2010. Incumbent Democratic governor Josh Shapiro was first elected with 56.5% of the vote in 2022, succeeding term-limited Democrat Tom Wolf.

== Democratic primary ==
=== Governor ===
==== Candidates ====
===== Nominee =====
- Josh Shapiro, incumbent governor (2023–present)

===== Declined =====
- Bob Casey Jr., former U.S. senator (2007–2025)

==== Endorsements ====
Josh Shapiro

Labor unions

- American Federation of Teachers Pennsylvania
- Pennsylvania Conference of Teamsters

Organizations

- Giffords
- Jewish Democratic Council of America

Political parties

- Pennsylvania Democratic Party

==== Results ====
Democratic primary results
Party	Candidate	Votes	%
Democratic	Josh Shapiro (incumbent)	1,116,960	100.0
Total votes		1,116,960	100.0

=== Lieutenant governor ===
==== Candidates ====
===== Nominee =====
- Austin Davis, incumbent lieutenant governor (2023–present)

==== Endorsements ====
Austin Davis

Labor unions

- American Federation of Teachers Pennsylvania
- Pennsylvania Conference of Teamsters

Political parties

- Pennsylvania Democratic Party

==== Results ====
Democratic primary results
Party	Candidate	Votes	%
Democratic	Austin Davis (incumbent)	1,072,694	100.0
Total votes		1,072,694	100.0

== Republican primary ==
=== Governor ===
Stacy Garrity was the only candidate on the ballot for the Republican nomination, making her the presumptive nominee. Supporters of previous nominee State Senator Doug Mastriano launched a write-in campaign, though Mastriano had previously stated he would not run for the nomination and had not expressed support for the campaign. Mastriano ultimately received 7,980 write-in votes.

==== Candidates ====
===== Nominee =====
- Stacy Garrity, Pennsylvania state treasurer (2021–present)

===== Withdrawn =====
- John Ventre, former Pennsylvania director for the Mutual UFO Network and perennial candidate (ran for lieutenant governor)

===== Declined =====
- Scott Martin, state senator from SD-13 (2017–present) and candidate for governor in 2022 (endorsed Garrity)
- Doug Mastriano, state senator from SD-33 (2019–present) and nominee for governor in 2022
- Dan Meuser, U.S. representative from PA-09 (2019–present) (running for re-election, endorsed Garrity)
- Dave Sunday, Pennsylvania attorney general (2025–present) (endorsed Garrity)
- Glenn Thompson, U.S. representative from PA-15 (2009–present) (running for re-election, endorsed Garrity)
- Mike Turzai, former speaker of the Pennsylvania House of Representatives (2015–2020) from HD-28 (2001–2020)

==== Endorsements ====
Stacy Garrity

Executive branch officials

- Donald Trump, president of the United States (2017–2021, 2025–present) (previously endorsed Meuser)

U.S. senators

- Dave McCormick, Pennsylvania (2025–present)
- Rick Santorum, former Pennsylvania (1995–2007)

U.S. representatives

- Rob Bresnahan, PA-08 (2025–present)
- Ryan Mackenzie, PA-07 (2025-present)
- Dan Meuser, PA-09 (2019–present)
- Lloyd Smucker, PA-11 (2017–present)
- Glenn Thompson, PA-15 (2009–present)
- Scott Perry, PA-10 (2013–present)

Statewide officials

- Tom Corbett, former governor of Pennsylvania (2011–2015)
- Timothy DeFoor, auditor general of Pennsylvania (2021–present)
- Dave Sunday, Pennsylvania attorney general (2025–present)

State legislators

- Scott Martin, SD-13 (2017–present)
- Joe Pittman, majority leader of the Pennsylvania Senate (2022–present) from SD-41 (2019–present)
- Jim Struzzi, HD-62 (2018–present)
- Jesse Topper, minority leader of the Pennsylvania House of Representatives (2025–present) from HD-78 (2014–present)
- Kim Ward, president pro tempore of the Pennsylvania Senate (2022–present) from SD-39 (2009–present)
- Martina White, HD-170 (2015–present)

Organizations

- Maggie's List

Political parties

- Pennsylvania Republican Party
Josh Shapiro (D)

Organizations

- Democrats for Education Reform
Dan Meuser (declined)

Executive branch officials

- ~~Donald Trump, president of the United States (2017–2021, 2025–present)~~ (later endorsed Garrity)

==== Polling ====
Hypothetical polling

Poll source	Date(s) administered	Sample size (Note: Key: A – all adults RV – registered voters LV – likely voters V – unclear)	Margin of error	Stacy Garrity	Doug Mastriano	Dan Meuser	Scott Perry	Kristin Phillips-Hill	Others	Undecided
Public Policy Polling (D)	September 18–19, 2025	524 (V)	± 4.3%	20%	39%	–	–	–	–	41%
Public Policy Polling (D)	May 2025	433 (LV)	–	18%	39%	6%	–	–	–	37%
Pennsylvania Leadership Conference	April 8, 2024	240 (V)	–	7%	6%	–	4%	3%	1%	79%

==== Results ====
Republican primary results
Party	Candidate	Votes	%
Republican	Stacy Garrity	641,534	100.0
Total votes		641,534	100.0

=== Lieutenant governor ===
==== Candidates ====
===== Nominee =====
- Jason Richey, chair of the Allegheny County Republican Party and candidate for governor in 2022

===== Eliminated in primary =====
- John Ventre, former Pennsylvania director for the Mutual UFO Network and perennial candidate (previously ran for governor)

===== Withdrawn =====
- Cris Dush, state senator from SD-25 (2021–present) (endorsed Richey)
- Brian Thomas, businessman

===== Declined =====
- Tom DiBello, Montgomery County Commissioner

==== Endorsements ====
Jason Richey

U.S. senators

- Dave McCormick, Pennsylvania (2025–present)

U.S. representatives

- Mike Kelly, PA-09 (2011–present)
- Dan Meuser, PA-09 (2019–present)
- Glenn Thompson, PA-15 (2009–present)

Statewide officials

- Stacy Garrity, treasurer of Pennsylvania (2021–present) and 2026 gubernatorial nominee
- Dave Sunday, Pennsylvania attorney general (2025–present)

State legislators

- Cris Dush, SD-25 (2021–present)

Political parties

- Pennsylvania Republican Party

==== Results ====
Primary results by county: Richey: 50–60%; 60–70%; 70–80%; 80–90%; Ventre: 50–60%; 60–70%; 70–80%

Republican primary results
Party	Candidate	Votes	%
Republican	Jason Richey	428,740	65.6
Republican	John Ventre	225,238	34.4
Total votes		653,978	100.0

== Libertarian convention ==
=== Governor ===
==== Nominee ====
- Ken Krawchuk, member of the Libertarian Party Judicial Committee and nominee for governor in 1998, 2002, and 2018

=== Lieutenant governor ===
==== Nominee ====
- John Thomas, educator and nominee for U.S. Senate in 2024

== Green convention ==
The Commonwealth Court ordered Dastra and Bolton off the general election ballot, after failing to reach the required threshold of 5,000 signatures.

=== Governor ===
==== Disqualified ====
- Tony Dastra, former Lancaster home rule commissioner, Green nominee for mayor in 2025 and independent candidate in 2017 (disqualified; running as a write-in)

=== Lieutenant governor ===
==== Disqualified ====
- Craig Bolton, chair of the Philadelphia Green Party (disqualified)

== General election ==
=== Campaign ===
A major issue in the general election has been the growing opposition to AI data centers, similarly experienced throughout the country. Shapiro, despite having previously supported the construction of two Amazon data center campuses estimated at $20 million the previous year and being quoted as saying Pennsylvania was "all in on AI", signed an executive order in August 2026 that implemented new regulations on them and eliminated fast-tracking of approvals to build them. Garrity has criticized Shapiro for this, claiming he "sold us out" for his prior support of Amazon's $20 million data center projects, although Garrity has similarly made comments supportive of AI data centers in the past and to which Shapiro has also capitalized on.

=== Predictions ===
Source	Ranking	As of
The Cook Political Report	Solid D	October 29, 2026
Decision Desk HQ	Safe D	November 3, 2026
Fox News	Solid D	November 1, 2026
Inside Elections	Solid D	October 29, 2026
NBC News	Solid D	November 3, 2026
RealClearPolitics	Solid D	November 1, 2026
Sabato's Crystal Ball	Safe D	November 2, 2026
Silver Bulletin	Solid D	November 3, 2026

=== Debates ===
2026 Pennsylvania gubernatorial debates and forums
No.	Date	Host	Moderator	Link	Democratic	Republican
Key: P Participant A Absent N Not invited I Invited W Withdrawn						
Key: P Participant A Absent N Not invited I Invited W Withdrawn					Shapiro	Garrity
1	Oct. 7, 2026	abc27	Dennis Owens, Lisa Sylvester	abc	P	P

=== Post-primary endorsements ===
Josh Shapiro (D)

Executive branch officials

- Barack Obama, former president of the United States (2009–2017)

Labor unions

- AFSCME District Council 47
- Amalgamated Transit Union Local 85
- Bricklayers Local 1
- Eastern Atlantic States Regional Council of Carpenters
- Fraternal Order of Police Lodges 5, 11, 92, and 109
- IBEW Local 5, 98, and 459
- International Brotherhood of Boilermakers Local 13
- International Union of Operating Engineers Local 66 and 542
- International Union of Painters and Allied Trades
- Iron Workers Local Union #3
- Pennsylvania AFL-CIO
- Pennsylvania Association of Staff Nurses and Allied Professionals
- Pennsylvania Professional Fire Fighters Association
- Pennsylvania State Education Association
- Philadelphia Building and Construction Trades
- Pittsburgh Building and Construction Trades
- SEIU State Council
- United Association Local 27 and 520

Organizations

- CASA In Action
- End Citizens United
- Everytown for Gun Safety
- Human Rights Campaign
- Moms Demand Action
- Planned Parenthood Pennsylvania PAC
- Steel City Stonewall Democrats
Stacy Garrity (R)

U.S. representatives

- John Joyce, PA-13 (2019–present)
- Fred Keller, former PA-12 (2019–2023)
- Mike Kelly, PA-16 (2011–present)
- Guy Reschenthaler, PA-14 (2019–present)

Statewide officials

- Ron DeSantis, governor of Florida (2019–present)

State legislators

- Dave Argall, SD-29 (2009–present)
- Lisa Baker, SD-20 (2007–present)
- Camera Bartolotta, SD-40 (2015–present)
- Sheryl Delozier, HD-88 (2009–present)
- Wayne Langerholc, SD-35 (2017–present)
- Doug Mastriano, SD-33 (2019–present) and 2022 gubernatorial nominee
- Tim O'Neal, HD-48 (2018–present)
- Clint Owlett, HD-68 (2018–present)
- Kristin Phillips-Hill, SD-28 (2019–present)
- David Rowe, HD-85 (2019–present)

Organizations

- Associated Builders and Contractors
- National Federation of Independent Business
- Pennsylvania Pro-Life Federation

=== Polling ===
Aggregate polls

Source of poll aggregation	Dates administered	Dates updated	Josh Shapiro (D)	Stacy Garrity (R)	Other/Undecided (Note: Calculated by taking the difference of 100% and all other candidates combined.)	Margin
270toWin	September 22 – October 21, 2026	October 22, 2026	56.8%	33.6%	9.6%	Shapiro +23.2%
Decision Desk HQ	through October 21, 2026	October 22, 2026	57.1%	33.0%	9.9%	Shapiro +24.1%
FiftyPlusOne	through October 21, 2026	October 22, 2026	57.4%	34.5%	8.1%	Shapiro +22.9%
RealClearPolitics	September 15 – October 18, 2026	October 22, 2026	57.2%	33.4%	9.4%	Shapiro +23.8%
Silver Bulletin	through October 18, 2026	October 22, 2026	57.0%	34.6%	8.4%	Shapiro +22.4%
Average			57.1%	33.8%	9.1%	Shapiro +23.3%

Poll source	Date(s) administered	Sample size	Margin of error	Josh Shapiro (D)	Stacy Garrity (R)	Other	Undecided
Research Co.	October 30 – November 1, 2026	450 (LV)	± 4.6%	59%	34%	1% (Note: Ken Krawchuck (L) with 1%)	6%
ActiVote	October 1–21, 2026	400 (LV)	± 4.9%	61.5%	38.5%	—	—
Franklin & Marshall College	October 7–18, 2026	808 (RV)	± 4.1%	52%	30%	4% (Note: "Some other candidate" with 4%)	14%
Franklin & Marshall College	October 7–18, 2026	808 (RV)	± 4.1%	54% (Note: Includes voters who lean towards a given candidate)	33%	4% (Note: "Some other candidate" with 4%)	9%
PennLive (Note: Poll sponsored by the Bravo Group)	October 5–11, 2026	628 (RV)	± 4.5%	58%	28%	7% (Note: "Someone else" with 6% and "Would not vote" with 1%)	8%
Quinnipiac University	October 1–5, 2026	1,159 (LV)	± 3.9%	59% (Note: Includes lean voters & those who already voted)	34%	3% (Note: Ken Krawchuk (L) with 2%; "Refused" with 1%)	4%
Z to A Research (D) (Note: Poll sponsored by Rust Belt Rising, which supports Democrats)	September 28 – October 1, 2026	630 (LV)	–	53%	34%	3% (Note: Ken Krawchuk (L) with 3%)	9%
Susquehanna Polling & Research (R)	September 22–30, 2026	700 (LV)	± 3.7%	52%	31%	–	17%
PennLive	September 16–22, 2026	624 (RV)	± 4.3%	55%	28%	10% (Note: "Someone else" with 9% and "Would not vote" with 1%)	8%
The New York Times/The Philadelphia Inquirer/Siena University	September 15–22, 2026	615 (LV)	± 4.4%	58%	38%	—	4%
The New York Times/The Philadelphia Inquirer/Siena University	September 15–22, 2026	615 (RV)	± 4.5%	57%	38%	—	5%
PennLive	August 18–22, 2026	711 (RV)	± 4.4%	56%	25%	—	19%
Franklin & Marshall College	August 17–23, 2026	501 (RV)	± 5.5%	50%	25%	7% (Note: Tony Dastra (G) with 2%; "Some other candidate" with 5%)	18%
The New York Times/The Philadelphia Inquirer/Siena University	August 17–21, 2026	760 (LV)	± 4.6%	55%	39%	—	6%
The New York Times/The Philadelphia Inquirer/Siena University	August 17–21, 2026	760 (RV)	± 4.5%	54%	37%	—	8%
National Public Affairs (R)	July 26–30, 2026	600 (LV)	± 4.0%	50%	43%	—	7%
Quinnipiac University	July 9–13, 2026	895 (RV)	± 4.3%	53%	40%	3% (Note: "Someone else", "Wouldn't Vote", and "Refused" with 1%)	4%
PennLive	June 18–25, 2026	644 (RV)	± 4.14%	54%	29%	7% (Note: "Someone else" with 6%; "Would not vote" with 1%)	9%
Franklin & Marshall College	June 8–14, 2026	546 (RV)	± 5.1%	50%	28%	6% (Note: "Some other candidate" with 6%)	16%
MAD Global Strategy (Note: Poll sponsored by Natural Allies for a Clean Energy Future)	June 9–11, 2026	600 (LV)	± 4.0%	48%	31%	—	18%
PennLive	May 20–24, 2026	683 (LV)	± 5.0%	53%	29%	—	18%
Susquehanna Polling & Research (R)	March 18–29, 2026	700 (LV)	± 3.7%	58%	36%	—	5%
Franklin & Marshall College	February 18 – March 1, 2026	834 (RV)	± 4.1%	48%	28%	7% (Note: "Some other candidate" with 7%)	17%
Quinnipiac University	February 19–23, 2026	836 (RV)	± 4.7%	55%	37%	1% (Note: "Refused" with 1%)	7%
Quinnipiac University	September 25–29, 2025	1,579 (RV)	± 3.3%	55%	39%	1%	5%
Susquehanna Polling & Research (R)	September 22–28, 2025	700 (LV)	± 3.7%	54%	36%	—	9%

Hypothetical polling

Josh Shapiro vs. Doug Mastriano
Aggregate polls

Source of poll aggregation	Dates administered	Dates updated	Josh Shapiro (D)	Doug Mastriano (R)	Other/Undecided	Margin
RealClearPolitics	September 22–29, 2025	November 24, 2025	55.5%	38.0%	6.5%	Shapiro +17.5%

Poll source	Date(s) administered	Sample size	Margin of error	Josh Shapiro (D)	Doug Mastriano (R)	Other	Undecided
Quinnipiac University	September 25–29, 2025	1,579 (RV)	± 3.3%	56%	39%	—	5%
Susquehanna Polling & Research (R)	September 22–28, 2025	704 (LV)	± 3.7%	55%	37%	—	7%

=== Results ===

Legend
- County flips
  Democratic
  Hold
  Flip
  Republican
  Hold

2026 Pennsylvania gubernatorial election
Party	Candidate	Votes	%	±%
Democratic	Josh Shapiro (incumbent); Austin Davis (incumbent)	3,039,710	60.56	
Republican	Stacy Garrity; Jason Richey	1,914,345	38.14	
Libertarian	Ken Krawchuk; John Thomas	64,992	1.29	
Total votes			100.0	
Democratic hold				

== See also ==
- 2026 United States elections
- 2026 Pennsylvania elections
- 2026 United States House of Representatives elections in Pennsylvania
- 2026 Pennsylvania Senate election
- 2026 Pennsylvania House of Representatives election

== Notes ==
Partisan clients
