= J. P. McCaskey =

J. P. McCaskey may refer to:

- John Piersol McCaskey, educator and mayor of Lancaster, Pennsylvania, from 1906 to 1910
- J. P. McCaskey High School, high school in Lancaster, Pennsylvania
