= Arthur E. Morris =

American politician

Mayor Arthur E. Morris

39th Mayor of Lancaster, Pennsylvania
- In office 1980–1990
- Preceded by: Albert Wohlsen
- Succeeded by: Janice Stork

Personal details
- Born: 1946 (age 79–80)
- Party: Republican
- Occupation: Civil Engineer

Arthur E. Morris is an American politician and professional engineer. Arthur Morris was the Pennsylvania State Mile High School Champion in 1963. He earned a B.S. degree in Civil Engineering from Penn State University (where he was a member of Alpha Epsilon Pi) and an Honorary Doctor of Science from Franklin and Marshall College.

== Biography ==
Morris designed flood control structures as a Hydraulic Engineer for the Pennsylvania Department of Forest and Waters from 1968 to 1970. He then worked for the City of Lancaster, Pennsylvania first as the City Engineer and later as Director of Public Works from 1970 to 1980.

On January 7, 1980, Morris was sworn as the youngest mayor in Lancaster history at the age of 34. He served as the mayor of Lancaster, Pennsylvania from 1980 to 1990. He served as President of Acer Engineers and Consultants from 1990 to 1993. From 1994 to 1996, Morris served as vice-president for research and membership of Public Technology Inc. Since 1997, he has been President of Keystone National Alliance and Utility Solutions.

Morris chaired the Board of the Lancaster County Convention Center Authority and the Nuclear Regulatory Commission’s Advisory Committee for the Decontamination of Three Mile Island.

From 2002 until December 31, 2006, Morris served on the board of the Sustainable Energy Fund of Central Eastern Pennsylvania, which was founded by the Pennsylvania Public Utility Commission.

In January 2008, former Lancaster County Commissioner Molly Henderson sued Morris, Lancaster Newspapers, Inc., and eight newspaper employees claiming that they injured her reputation during her tenure as Commissioner. The dispute centered around building a downtown convention center, and followed her defeat in a 2007 re-election bid. On June 7, 2011 the Court of Common Pleas, Chester County, Pennsylvania entered a judgement in favor of Morris which judgement was affirmed by the Superior Court of Pennsylvania on September 28, 2012. The "Arthur Morris Lancaster Mile" Race is held in his honor as a fund raiser for his legal defense fund.

Political offices
Preceded by Albert Wohlsen	Mayor of Lancaster, Pennsylvania; 1980–1990	Succeeded by Janice C. Stork
