= Bare (surname) =

Bare is a surname. Notable people with the surname include:

- Bobby Bare (born 1935), American country music singer and songwriter
- Bobby Bare Jr. (born 1966), American musician
- Howard Bare (1911–2002), mayor of Lancaster, Pennsylvania (1950–1951)
- Jeanne Baré (1740–1803), French botanist and seafarer
- Kendig C. Bare (1913–1989), twice mayor of Lancaster, Pennsylvania (1950 and 1951–58)
- Mike Bare (born 1983), Wisconsin politician
- Ray Bare (1949–1994), Major League Baseball pitcher
- Richard L. Bare (1913–2015), American director of television shows and movies
- Thomas D. Bare (1867–1931), American newspaper editor and politician
