= George Coe (disambiguation) =

George Coe (1929–2015) was an American stage, film and television actor and voice artist.

George Coe may also refer to:

- George Albert Coe, American scholar
- George Coe (Lincoln County War) (1856–1941), Old West cowboy
- George Coe (Michigan politician) (1811–1869), politician from the U. S. state of Michigan
- George Coe (mayor), American mayor of Lancaster, Pennsylvania, 1962–1966

== See also ==
- George H. Coes (1828–1897), minstrel musician
