= Harry Trout =

Harry Trout may refer to:

- Harry E. Trout (1876–1941), head college football coach for the West Virginia University Mountaineers in 1903
- Harry L. Trout (1853–1920), American mayor of Lancaster, Pennsylvania (1915–1920)

== See also ==
- Harry Trott (1866–1917), Australian cricketer
