= John McGonigle =

John McGonigle may refer to:

- John P. McGonigle, American sheriff and convicted criminal
- Johnny McGonigle (born 1944), British boxer

== See also ==
- John MacGonigle (fl. 1877–1884), American politician
