= Smeltz =

Smeltz is a surname. Notable people with the surname include:

- Edwin Smeltz, American politician
- Shane Smeltz (born 1981), New Zealand (association) footballer
