= Molly Henderson =

American politician

Molly S. Henderson

Lancaster County Commissioner
- In office January 5, 2004 – January 5, 2008
- Preceded by: Ron Ford
- Succeeded by: Craig Lehman

Personal details
- Born: September 14, 1953 (age 72) Cumberland, Maryland
- Party: Democratic
- Spouse: Alex Henderson

Molly Henderson (born September 14, 1953) is a former Commissioner of Lancaster County, Pennsylvania. The Commissioners are the chief executive and legislative officials of the County, which has 500,000 residents spread over 940 square miles (2,400 km^{2}) and an annual County budget of $300 million. Henderson was elected in 2003 to a four-year term and was the lone Democrat on the Board of Commissioners in a County where Republicans outnumber Democrats two to one.

Henderson was previously Head of Public Health for the City of Lancaster, Pennsylvania, the County seat. Henderson was not re-elected as Lancaster County Commissioner on November 7, 2007. Henderson was succeeded by Craig Lehman as the minority Commissioner.

== Other careers ==
She is a former high school and college teacher, holding a doctorate degree from Temple University, a master's degree from West Chester University and her B.S. from James Madison University. Henderson is also a Respiratory Therapist and worked at Lancaster General Hospital prior to her teaching and government careers.

Henderson's book Pressed: Public Money, Private Profit - A Cautionary Tale tells the story of the development, building, and financing of the Lancaster County Convention Center and Marriott Hotel in downtown Lancaster. The highly controversial "convention center project," as it was known to those in Lancaster County (pop. 510,000), was originally proposed in 1999 as a $75 million "public-private" partnership. The project included a publicly owned convention center ($30 million) and a privately owned hotel ($45 million). By the time the convention center and hotel opened in 2009, the project's cost had ballooned to more than $170 million, with more than 90% of the total cost of both the convention center and hotel borne by Pennsylvania taxpayers.

== Political views ==
Henderson is a notable opponent of the Lancaster County Convention Center Authority's controversial $170 million hotel/convention center in downtown Lancaster on the site of the former Watt & Shand building. The project's supporters believe it would promote the revitalization of the city's center. Its opponents, however, feel it poses an unacceptable risk to taxpayers. The hotel portion of the project is owned 50% by Lancaster Newspapers, Inc. which have been accused of using their monopoly print position in the County to promote the project and stifle opposition. Henderson has been referenced in more than 2,200 newspaper articles, over 700 of which concern the Lancaster County Convention Center project, many of them attacking her position.

== Personal life ==
Henderson is married to Alex Henderson and has two children, Alexander "Ander" Henderson and Leslie Henderson.

== See also ==
- Lancaster County
- Lancaster City
- Lancaster Newspapers
