= Christian Kieffer =

American politician (1799–1885)

Mayor of Lancaster, Pennsylvania
- In office 1852–1854
- Preceded by: Michael Carpenter
- Succeeded by: Jacob Alrights

Member of the Pennsylvania House of Representatives from the Lancaster County district
- In office 1841–1842

Personal details
- Party: Whig

Christian Kieffer was an American politician who served in the Pennsylvania House of Representatives as a member of the Whig Party from 1841 to 1842. He also served as the sixth mayor of Lancaster, Pennsylvania, from 1852 to 1854.

== Biography ==
Christian Kieffer was born in 1799 near Mercersburg, Pennsylvania. He was a copper merchant who served on the Lancaster School Board and city council before serving in the Pennsylvania House of Representatives from 1841 to 1842 as a member of the Whig Party. He was elected mayor of Lancaster from 1852 to 1855. He died on September 4, 1885, in Lancaster.

Political offices
Preceded by Michael Carpenter	Mayor of Lancaster, Pennsylvania; 1852–1854	Succeeded by Jacob Alrights
