= Frank Musser =

American politician

Frank Custer Musser was an American politician. He served as the 27th mayor of Lancaster, Pennsylvania from 1922 to 1930. He ran for Congress in Pennsylvania but was unsuccessful.

Political offices
Preceded by Horace E. Kennedy	Mayor of Lancaster, Pennsylvania; 1922–1930	Succeeded by T. Warren Metzger
