= Old City Hall (Lancaster, Pennsylvania) =

- U.S. National Register of Historic Places
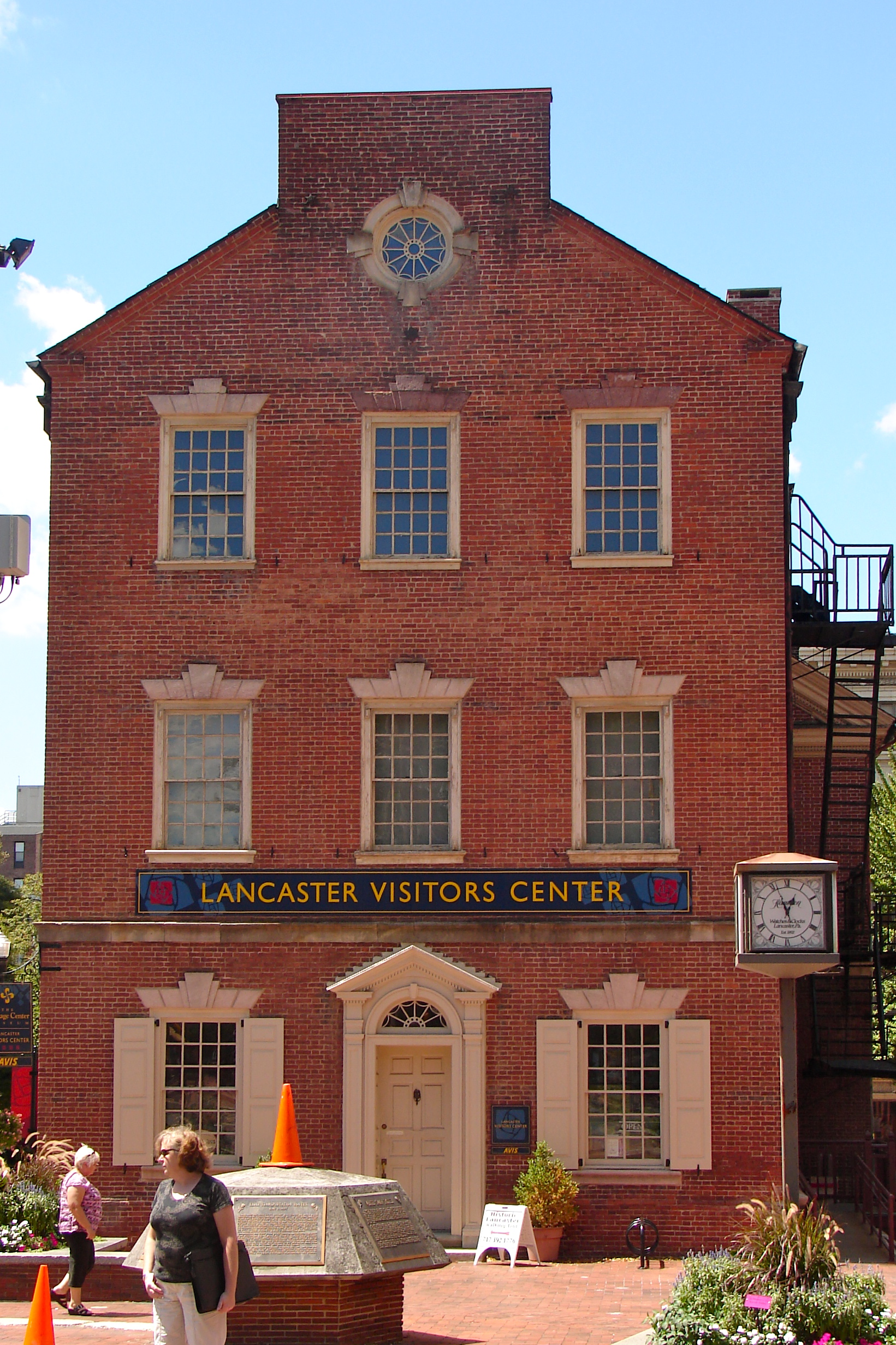
- Old City Hall, August 2011

- Location within Pennsylvania Location within the United States
- Location: Penn Sq., Lancaster, Pennsylvania
- Coordinates: 40°2′17″N 76°18′23″W
- Area: less than one acre
- Built: 1795–1797
- Architectural style: Federal
- NRHP reference No.: 72001129
- Added to NRHP: June 30, 1972

The Old City Hall, also known as the County Court House and State House, is a historic, American city hall building that is located in Lancaster, Lancaster County, Pennsylvania.

It was added to the National Register of Historic Places in 1972.

== History and architectural features ==
Built between 1795 and 1797, this historic structure is a three-and-one-half-story, brick building with stone accents that was designed in the Federal style. It was built as a "public office house" and housed the Commonwealth offices when Lancaster was the capital from 1799 to 1812. This building, which was restored in 1924, has also housed city and county offices, a Masonic lodge, a post office, and library.

== See also ==
- List of mayors of Lancaster, Pennsylvania
