= Horace E. Kennedy =

American politician

Horace E. Kennedy was an American politician. He served as the 26th mayor of Lancaster, Pennsylvania from 1920 to 1922.

Political offices
| Preceded by Harry L. Trout | Mayor of Lancaster, Pennsylvania; 1920–1922 | Succeeded by Frank Musser |
