= Simon Shissler =

American politician (1856–1951)

Simon Shissler was an American politician.

== Early life ==
Shissler was born on April 16, 1856, in Paradise Township, Lancaster County, Pennsylvania. At the age of two, he moved to Lancaster, Pennsylvania, where he began attending public schools. His father died when Shissler was 13-years-old.

== Career ==
Following his father's death, young Shissler became John Hull's apprentice in a cigar making business. Three years later, he worked for Albright & Bros and Metzger & Wiley, before excepting a position as a mailman where he served four years. In June 1889, Shissler formed his own business on 52nd North Queen Street, a tobacco firm called Simon Shissler and Son.

In 1890 Shissler was elected as a city council representative from the Democratic Party in a majorly Republican state. After the 1892 election, he served on the Special Water Committee and next year represented the Fifth ward of the state of Pennsylvania.

In 1898, the people of Lancaster, Pennsylvania, voted him in as the twentieth mayor of the city for a two-year term. He won election by one vote. Simon Shissler decided not to pursue re-election, and in spring 1900 he joined the school board of the ward following by a service to the City Democratic Committee. In the early 1920s, he served as city comptroller.

== Personal life ==
In 1879, Shissler married Alice Anderson. Together they had three children: Henry, Walter and Clyde, with the latter of which he owned a retail elgar and tobacco firm for 30 years. Shissler retired from business in 1937 and died on April 3, 1951. Shissler’s great-grandson, Andrew Shissler of Bethel Park, Pennsylvania, was famous for playing lead bass in Morningside, later named Three Seventy Six after the departure of vocalist and co-founding member, Bryan Brunsel.

Political offices
Preceded by Edwin Smeltz	Mayor of Lancaster, Pennsylvania; 1898–1900	Succeeded by Henry Muhlenberg
