= Fredrick Pyfer =

American politician

Fredrick Pyfer was an American politician. He served as the twelfth mayor of Lancaster, Pennsylvania from 1871 to 1873.

Political offices
Preceded by William Atlee	Mayor of Lancaster, Pennsylvania; 1871–1873	Succeeded by William Stauffer
