= Henry F. Walton =

American politician (1858–1921)

Speaker of the Pennsylvania House of Representatives
- In office 1895–1896
- Preceded by: Caleb C. Thompson
- Succeeded by: Henry K. Boyer
- In office 1903–1906
- Preceded by: William T. Marshall
- Succeeded by: Frank B. McClain

Personal details
- Born: October 2, 1858 Stroudsburg, Pennsylvania
- Died: May 5, 1921 (aged 62) Philadelphia, Pennsylvania
- Party: Republican

Henry F. Walton (October 2, 1858 – May 4, 1921) was an American politician who served as speaker of the Pennsylvania House of Representatives from 1895 to 1896 and 1903 to 1906.

== Early life ==
Walton was born on October 2, 1858, in Stroudsburg, Pennsylvania. His family moved to Philadelphia when he was one year old. He was educated in the School District of Philadelphia and had private tutors. He studied law in the office of Wayne MacVeagh and George Tucker Bispham.

== Career ==
In 1884, Walton became an assistant city solicitor of Philadelphia. He was elected to the Pennsylvania House of Representatives in 1890 and made a run for speaker in 1892. Although he was unsuccessful in becoming speaker, he was appointed chairman of the judiciary committee. He was elected speaker of the house in 1895. He did not run for reelection in 1896, instead running for the Fifth District seat in the Pennsylvania Senate. In 1899, he was appointed solicitor of the Philadelphia County sheriff's office. He ran for the Senate again in 1900, but lost the Republican nomination to William H. Berkelbach. Walton returned to the House in 1902 and was once again elected speaker. He did not run for reelection in 1906. He was elected state party chairman in 1910 and 1911, but did not seek another term in 1912.

In 1910, Walton was elected Prothonotary of the County of Philadelphia and Clerk of the Courts of Common Pleas by the board of judges. He held this position until his death on May 4, 1921. His cause of death was described as an "an acute attack of neuritis".
