= Robert Clark (mayor) =

American politician

Robert Clark was an American politician. He served as the eighteenth mayor of Lancaster, Pennsylvania from 1890 to 1894.

Political offices
Preceded by Edward Edgerly	Mayor of Lancaster, Pennsylvania; 1890–1894	Succeeded by Edwin Smeltz
