= Frank B. McClain =

Pennsylvania politician

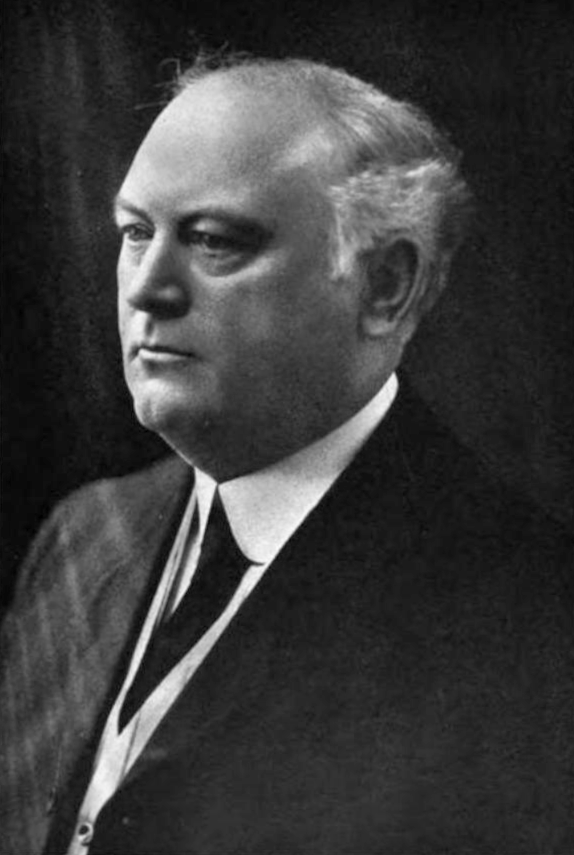

11th Lieutenant Governor of Pennsylvania
- In office January 20, 1915 – January 15, 1919
- Governor: Martin Brumbaugh
- Preceded by: John Reynolds
- Succeeded by: Edward Beidleman

Mayor of Lancaster, Pennsylvania
- In office January 3, 1910 – January 20, 1915
- Preceded by: John McCaskey
- Succeeded by: Harry Trout

61st Speaker of the Pennsylvania House of Representatives
- In office 1907–1909
- Preceded by: Henry Walton
- Succeeded by: John Cox

Member of the Pennsylvania House of Representatives from the Lancaster County district
- In office January 1, 1895 – January 3, 1910

Personal details
- Born: Francis Bernard McClain; April 14, 1864 Lancaster, Pennsylvania
- Died: October 11, 1925 (aged 61) Lancaster, Pa
- Party: Republican
- Spouse: Ellen Bernardine O'Neill/O'Neil
- Children: 1 (died in infancy)
- Profession: Cattle trader
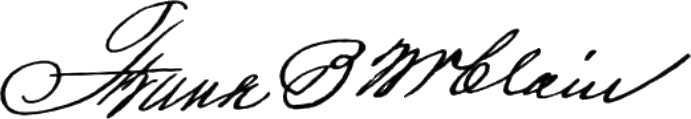
- Signature

Francis Bernard McClain (April 14, 1864 – October 11, 1925) was the 11th lieutenant governor of Pennsylvania from 1915 to 1919.

== Biography ==
McClain was born in Lancaster, Pennsylvania, during the American Civil War. He was the son of Francis McClain from Derry, Ireland. His mother was Susan Mulhatton from Lancaster, Pennsylvania. He attended parochial schools in Lancaster, Pennsylvania, and graduated from Lancaster High School Class of 1881. He received an honorary Doctorate of Laws from Villanova University 1919. He worked as a cattle dealer and was instrumental in the formation of the Lancaster Live-Stock Exchange and was elected the first president. McClain married Ellen Bernardine O'Neill of Lancaster, Pennsylvania, on February 14, 1888 (Valentine's Day); they had one child, who died in infancy.

In 1894, McClain was elected as Republican to the state legislature, House of Representatives, for the State of Pennsylvania. He was re-elected in 1896, 1898, 1900,1902, 1904, 1906, and 1908. Vice-president of the Committee on Appropriations, he was also a member of other committees and special committees including, Ways and Means, and Corporations and Railroads. Elected Speaker for the House of Representatives 1907–1909. 1910 elected Republican Mayor (24th) of Lancaster, Pennsylvania. 1911 re-elected for 4 years term as mayor. He resigned January 6, 1915, to qualify for office of (11th) Lt. Governor for the State of Pennsylvania, which he was then elected to in November 1914.

McClain was a member of several charitable and philanthropic organisations. Some of these were: trustee of Home for Friendless Children, director of Lancaster Historical Society, member of the Union League of Philadelphia, Pennsylvania, member of the Young Republican Club, vice-president of the Thaddeus Stevens Industrial School of Lancaster, member of the Moose Lodge, director of the A. Herr-Smith Library of Lancaster, member of the Elks, member of the American Club of Pittsburgh, Pennsylvania, member of the Saddle and Sirloin Club of Chicago, president for over 20 years of The Terrapin Club of Philadelphia, Pennsylvania.

McClain died in Lancaster, Pennsylvania, after a long illness, on October 11, 1925, aged 61 years old. He is buried in St. Mary's Roman Catholic Cemetery, Lancaster, Pennsylvania. He was known as "The Red Rose of Lancaster" for the red rose he always wore in his lapel.(KFH)

Political offices
Preceded by John Reynolds	Lieutenant Governor of Pennsylvania; 1915–1919	Succeeded by Edward Beidleman
Preceded by John McCaskey	Mayor of Lancaster, Pennsylvania; 1910–1915	Succeeded by Harry Trout
Preceded by Henry Walton	Speaker of the Pennsylvania House of Representatives; 1907–1909	Succeeded by John Cox
Party political offices
Preceded by John Reynolds	Republican nominee for Lieutenant Governor of Pennsylvania; 1914	Succeeded by Edward Beidleman
