= William Atlee =

American politician

William Atlee was an American politician. He served as the eleventh mayor of Lancaster, Pennsylvania from 1869 to 1871.

Political offices
| Preceded by George Sanderson | Mayor of Lancaster, Pennsylvania; 1869–1871 | Succeeded by Fredrick Pyfer |
