= William Morton (American politician) =

American politician

William Morton was an American politician. He served as the sixteenth mayor of Lancaster, Pennsylvania from 1886 to 1888.

Political offices
Preceded by David Rosenmiller	Mayor of Lancaster, Pennsylvania; 1886–1888	Succeeded by Edward Edgerly
