= James Ross (mayor) =

American politician

James Ross was an American politician. He was the 29th mayor of Lancaster, Pennsylvania, from 1934 to 1938.

Political offices
Preceded by T. Warren Metzger	Mayor of Lancaster, Pennsylvania; 1934–1938	Succeeded by Dale Cary
