= Janice Stork =

40th Mayor of Lancaster, Pennsylvania
- In office January 1990 – January 1998
- Preceded by: Arthur E. Morris
- Succeeded by: Charlie Smithgall

Personal details
- Party: Democratic
- Profession: Businessperson and politician

Janice C. Stork is an American politician, businesswoman, and member of the Democratic Party. Stork was elected as the first female Mayor of Lancaster, Pennsylvania, on November 7, 1989, defeating Republican challenger, Mary Lou Broucht. Stork, who had previously served on the Lancaster City Council, served as Mayor for two, consecutive four-year terms from January 1990 until January 1998.

Stork narrowly won re-election to second term in November 1993. She defeated former Lancaster County Commissioner Brad S. Fischer, by only 255 votes, or 2.2%, the second-closest mayoral election in the city's history.

She retired from office in January 1998 and was succeeded by Republican Mayor Charlie Smithgall.

Political offices
Preceded by Arthur E. Morris	Mayor of Lancaster, Pennsylvania; 1990–1998	Succeeded by Charlie Smithgall
