= Edward Edgerly =

American politician

Edward Edgerly was an American politician. He served as the seventeenth mayor of Lancaster, Pennsylvania from 1888 to 1890.

Political offices
Preceded by William Morton	Mayor of Lancaster, Pennsylvania; 1888–1890	Succeeded by Robert Clark
