= Chester Cummings =

American politician

Chester Cummings was an American politician. He served as the 22nd mayor of Lancaster, Pennsylvania, from 1902 to 1906.

Political offices
Preceded by Henry Muhlenberg	Mayor of Lancaster, Pennsylvania; 1902–1906	Succeeded by John Piersol McCaskey
