= Henry Muhlenberg (mayor) =

American politician

Henry Muhlenberg was an American politician. He served as the 21st mayor of Lancaster, Pennsylvania from 1900 to 1902.

Political offices
Preceded by Simon Shissler	Mayor of Lancaster, Pennsylvania; 1900–1902	Succeeded by Chester Cummings
