= David Rosenmiller =

American politician

David Rosenmiller was an American politician. He served as the fifteenth mayor of Lancaster, Pennsylvania from 1884 to 1886.

Political offices
Preceded by John MacGonigle	Mayor of Lancaster, Pennsylvania; 1884–1886	Succeeded by William Morton
