= Richard M. Scott =

American politician (1918–2005)

Dick Scott
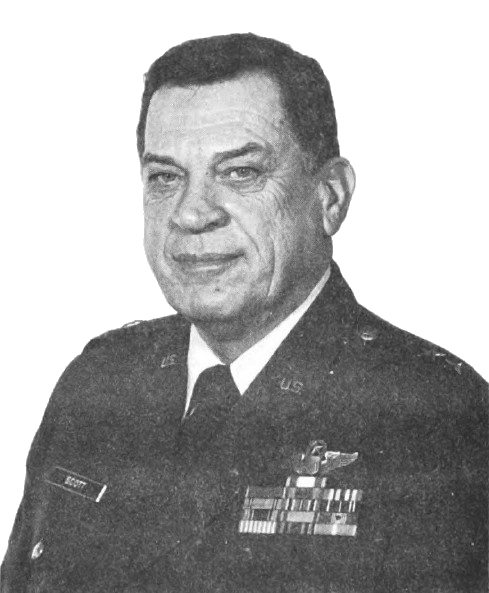
- Dick Scott as a Major General in 1979

Adjutant General of Pennsylvania
- In office 1979–1986
- Governor: Dick Thornburgh

Mayor of Lancaster, Pennsylvania
- In office 1974–1979
- Preceded by: Thomas J. Monaghan
- Succeeded by: Albert Wohlsen

Personal details
- Born: April 28, 1918 Lancaster, Pennsylvania, US
- Died: January 2, 2005 (aged 86) Reading, Pennsylvania, US

Military service
- Allegiance: United States of America
- Branch/service: United States Army Air Forces; United States Air Force
- Years of service: 1942–1970 Active Duty; 1979–1986 National Guard
- Rank: Major General
- Commands: Pennsylvania National Guard; 67th Fighter Bomber Squadron
- Battles/wars: World War II
- Awards: Distinguished Service Medal; Legion of Merit; Air Medal

Richard Martin Scott (April 28, 1918 – January 2, 2005) was an American politician, U.S. Air Force pilot, and the former Mayor of Lancaster, Pennsylvania. He is best known to have led the effort to bring professional baseball back to the city of Lancaster. This was realized with the creation of the Lancaster Barnstormers, of the Atlantic League of Professional Baseball. He also served as Adjutant General of Pennsylvania from 1979 to 1986.

== Biography ==
Scott was born in the city of Lancaster, Pennsylvania, to Roy V. and Laura Scott. He graduated from the Lancaster Boys' High School in 1936 and was subsequently appointed to the United States Military Academy from Pennsylvania's 10th congressional district by Republican representative J. Roland Kinzer in 1938. Scott graduated from West Point with a B.S. degree in engineering in May 1942. He then completed flight training in December 1942.

Scott was stationed in England in January 1944 and began flying P-38 missions over Europe during World War II. While assigned to the 385th Fighter Squadron, 364th Fighter Group, 8th Fighter Command on March 15, 1944, Scott's plane clipped a transmission tower in the Netherlands, shearing off his left wing and forcing a crash landing in Nazi-occupied territory. Scott eluded capture for several months with the help of the Dutch resistance, with whom he joined for several months. The Dutch resistance conceived a plot to help Scott escape the Netherlands by traveling through occupied Belgium and France before arriving in neutral Switzerland. However, Nazi spies who had infiltrated the resistance learned of the plot and Scott was arrested by German authorities.

Scott managed to escape from the Nazis twice during his detention. In 1945, he escaped for the second time from a prisoner of war camp in Sagan, Germany, and was able to rejoin the American forces. Upon reaching the Americans, Scott was nearly shot by them because they did not initially believe he was an escaped American prisoner of war.

After the war, Scott served as a fighter test pilot at Eglin Air Force Base in Florida from August 1945 to August 1946 and then as a cold weather test pilot at Ladd Air Force Base in Alaska from September 1946 to November 1948.

In April 1954, Scott was deployed to the Western Pacific. He served with the 18th Fighter Bomber Wing in South Korea and commanded the 67th Fighter Bomber Squadron in Taiwan and Okinawa.

While stationed at Sandia Base from February 1956 to June 1958, Scott studied political science at the University of New Mexico. He later earned an M.A. degree in international affairs from The George Washington University in 1963. Scott was also June 1949 graduate of the Air Command and Staff College, a January 1956 graduate of the Armed Forces Staff College, a July 1963 graduate of the National War College and a 1980 graduate of the Senior Reserve Component Officer Course at the Army War College.

Scott retired from the United States Air Force in 1970 as a brigadier general. He was elected Mayor of Lancaster, Pennsylvania, in 1973. He was re-elected in 1977. Under his leadership, Lancaster City was renewed with the Armstrong-National Central Bank and a lower crime rate.

Albert Wohlsen was appointed interim mayor in 1979 after Scott resigned as mayor to serve as adjutant general of Pennsylvania from 1979 to 1986 under former Pennsylvania Governor Dick Thornburgh. Promoted to major general, he was the first Pennsylvania adjutant general affiliated with the Air National Guard instead of the Army National Guard. As adjutant general, Scott led the Pennsylvania National Guard and the state's veterans programs.

His military awards include the Distinguished Service Medal, the Legion of Merit and the Air Medal. In 2004, a highway bridge on Pennsylvania Route 72 over a rail line through Manheim Township, Lancaster County was named the "General Richard M. Scott Bridge" in his honor.

Scott died on January 2, 2005, at Reading Hospital in Reading, Pennsylvania at the age of 86. In 2006, Scott was posthumously inducted into the Pennsylvania Department of Military and Veterans Affairs Hall of Fame.

Political offices
Preceded by Thomas J. Monaghan	Mayor of Lancaster, Pennsylvania; 1974–1979	Succeeded by Albert B. Wohlsen, Jr.
