= 2017 Lancaster, Pennsylvania, mayoral election =

Lancaster mayoral election, 2017
- November 7, 2017
Candidate	Danene Sorace	Cindy Stewart
Party	Democratic	Republican
Popular vote	4,804	1,490
Percentage	72.44%	22.47%
Mayor before election
Rick Gray
Democratic
Elected mayor
Danene Sorace
Democratic

The 2017 mayoral election in Lancaster, Pennsylvania, was held on November 7, 2017, and resulted in the election of Democratic Party nominee Danene Sorace to her first term as mayor.

== Background ==
Three-term incumbent mayor Rick Gray, a Democrat, did not seek re-election.

== Campaign ==
The general election was contested by five candidates: Democratic nominee Danene Sorace, a member of the Lancaster City Council; Republican Party nominee Cindy Stewart, a retired nonprofit executive; and independent candidates John "Woody" Chandler, a former U.S. Navy sailor and teacher; Tony Dastra, a coffee shop shift manager and open government activist; and Zac Nesbitt, a restaurant server and co-chair of the Lancaster Pride Fest.

Norman Bristol Colon, a political consultant and activist; and Kevin Ressler, a community organizer and advocate, also sought the Democratic nomination. Stewart was unopposed for the Republican nomination.

== Results ==
Mayor of Lancaster, 2017
Primary election
Party	Candidate	Votes	%
Democratic	Danene Sorace	2,012	46.91%
Democratic	Kevin Ressler	1,260	29.38%
Democratic	Norman Bristol Colon	1,014	23.64%
	write-ins	3	0.07%
Total votes		4,289	100.00%

Mayor of Lancaster, 2017 general election
Party	Candidate	Votes	%
Democratic	Danene Sorace	4,804	72.44%
Republican	Cindy Stewart	1,490	22.47%
Independent	Tony Dastra	149	2.25%
Independent	Zac Nesbitt	69	1.04%
Independent	John "Woody" Chandler	68	1.03%
	write-ins	52	0.78%
Total votes		6,632	100.00%
Democratic hold			

== See also ==
- 2017 United States elections
- List of mayors of Lancaster, Pennsylvania
