= T. Warren Metzger =

American politician

T. Warren Metzger was an American politician. He served as the 28th mayor of Lancaster, Pennsylvania from 1930 to 1934.

Political offices
Preceded by Frank Musser	Mayor of Lancaster, Pennsylvania; 1930–1934	Succeeded by James Ross
