= Dale Cary =

American politician

Dale Cary is a former American politician. He served as the 30th mayor of Lancaster, Pennsylvania from 1938 to 1950.

Political offices
Preceded by James Ross	Mayor of Lancaster, Pennsylvania; 1938–1950	Succeeded by Kendig C. Bare
