= George Sanderson (politician) =

American politician (1810–1886)

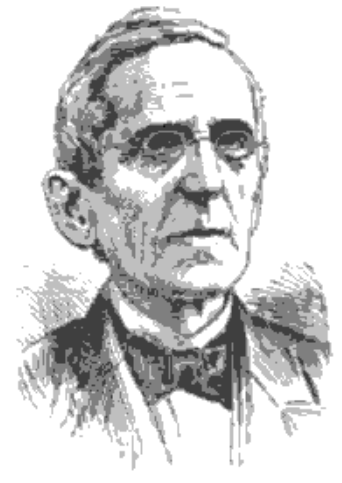

Mayor of Lancaster, Pennsylvania
- In office 1859–1868

Member of the Pennsylvania State Senate
- In office 1851–1854
- Constituency: 17th district

Personal details
- Born: February 25, 1810 Boston, Massachusetts
- Died: April 1, 1886 (aged 76) Scranton, Pennsylvania
- Party: Whig
- Spouse: Marion Kingsbury
- Education: Boston Latin School
- Occupation: Politician

George Sanderson (February 25, 1810 – April 1, 1886) was an American politician who served as a Whig member of the Pennsylvania State Senate for the 17th district from 1851 to 1854 and as the tenth mayor of Lancaster, Pennsylvania, from 1859 to 1868.

== Early life ==
Sanderson was born in Boston, Massachusetts, and received his education at the Boston Latin School. He worked in merchandising in New York City, New York prior to his relocation to Geneva, New York.

Following his marriage to Marion Kingsbury, he relocated with her to Towanda, Pennsylvania. He studied law and served as District Attorney for six years before resigning to work in private business.

== Career ==
He was elected to the Pennsylvania State Senate for the 17th district and served from 1851 to 1854. He befriended Colonel George W. Scranton in 1853 and became one of the founders of Scranton, Pennsylvania.

As mayor of Lancaster, Pennsylvania, Sanderson formed the Lancaster City Police force in 1865.

He died at his home in Green Ridge, Scranton on April 1, 1886, and was interred at Forest Hill Cemetery in Dunmore, Pennsylvania.

Pennsylvania State Senate
Preceded by Henry Fulton	Member of the Pennsylvania Senate, 17th district 1851-1853	Succeeded by William Henry Welsh
Political offices
Preceded by Thomas Henry Burrowes	Mayor of Lancaster, Pennsylvania; 1859–1868	Succeeded by William Atlee
