= Danene Sorace =

American politician

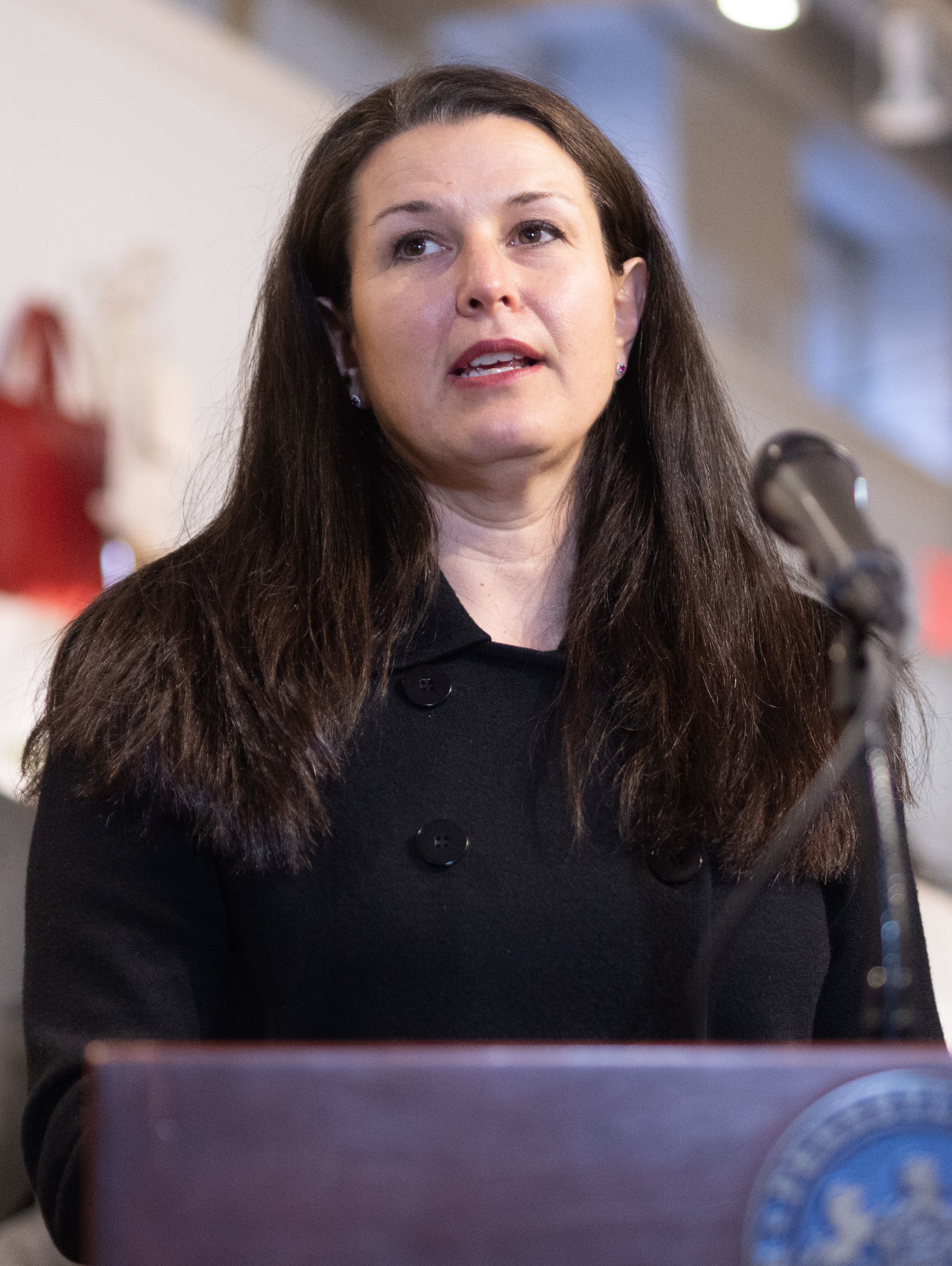
- Sorace in 2022

43rd Mayor of Lancaster, Pennsylvania
- In office January 3, 2018 – January 5, 2026
- Preceded by: Rick Gray
- Succeeded by: Jaime Arroyo

Personal details
- Party: Democratic
- Education: Albright College (B.A.); Rutgers University(M.P.P.)

Danene Sorace is an American politician and former mayor of Lancaster, Pennsylvania. She was elected as the 43rd mayor of Lancaster and the second woman to serve in the position. She is a member of the Democratic Party. She received her bachelor's degree from Albright College and her master's degree in public policy from Rutgers University. She is also the former director of the Answer program at Rutgers.

Sorace won election as mayor in 2017 with 73 percent of the vote to 23 percent for Republican nominee Cindy Stewart, and three independent candidates garnering a combined 4 percent. She began her term on January 3, 2018. Prior to becoming mayor, she served one four-year term on the Lancaster city council where she headed the finance committee.

Sorace was reelected as mayor in 2021, defeating independent Willie E. Shell Sr.

== Electoral history ==
Mayor of Lancaster, 2017
Primary election
Party	Candidate	Votes	%
Democratic	Danene Sorace	2,012	46.9%
Democratic	Kevin Ressler	1,260	29.4%
Democratic	Norman Bristol Colon	1,014	23.6%
Write-in		3	0.1%
Total votes		4,289	100.00%

Mayor of Lancaster, 2017 general election
Party	Candidate	Votes	%
Democratic	Danene Sorace	4,804	72.4%
Republican	Cindy Stewart	1,490	22.5%
Independent	Tony Dastra	149	2.2%
Independent	Zac Nesbitt	69	1.0%
Independent	John "Woody" Chandler	68	1.0%
Write-in		52	0.8%
Total votes		6,632	100.0%
Democratic hold			

Mayor of Lancaster, 2021
Party	Candidate	Votes	%
Democratic	Danene Sorace (incumbent)	4,487	72.8%
Independent	Willie E. Shell, Sr.	1,614	26.2%
Write-in		60	1.0%
Total votes		6,161	100.0%
Democratic hold			
