= Howard Bare =

American attorney and politician

Howard C. Bare (November 23, 1911 — July 13, 2002) was an attorney. He was the mayor of Lancaster, Pennsylvania for eight months from 1950 to 1951 during the period when his brother Kendig C. Bare, elected mayor in 1950, was in military service in the Korean War.

Political offices
Preceded by Kendig C. Bare	Mayor of Lancaster, Pennsylvania; 1950–1951	Succeeded by Kendig C. Bare
