= Park City Center =

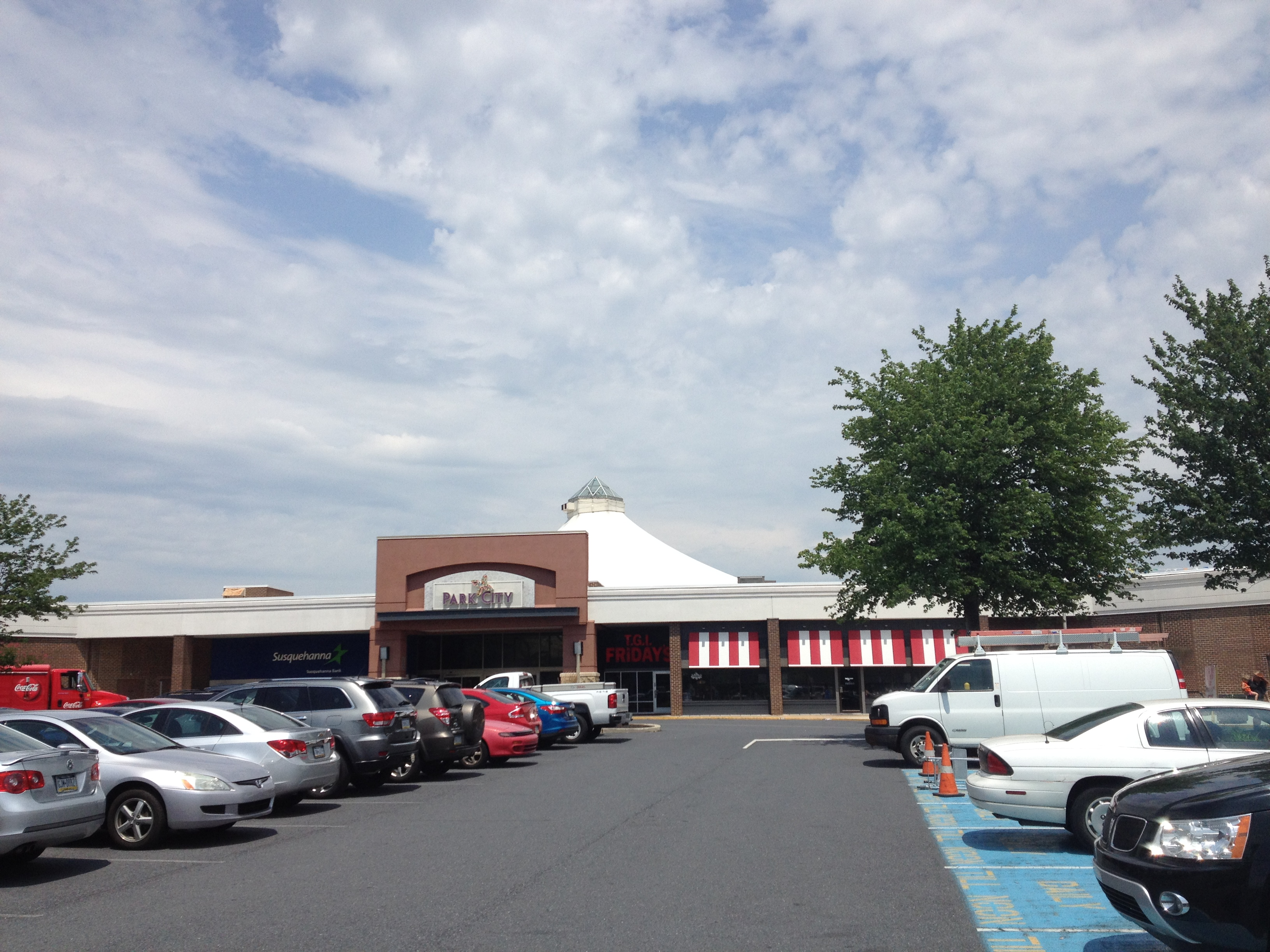
- South entrance to Park City Center
- Location: Lancaster, Pennsylvania, U.S.
- Coordinates: 40.0673°N 76.3390°W
- Address: 142 Park City Center
- Opened: September 1971; 55 years ago
- Developer: Park City Shopping Center Corporation
- Manager: GGP
- Owner: GGP
- Num. of stores: 160+
- Num. of anchor tenants: 5
- Floor area: 1,443,000 square feet (134,100 m^{2})
- Floors: 1 with partial lower level (2 in Boscov's, JCPenney, Raymour and Flanigan, and former Sears)
- Parking: Parking lot with 7,000 spaces
- Public transit: RRTA bus: 8 LT bus: 7
- Website: www.parkcitycenter.com

Park City Center is a shopping mall located in Lancaster, Pennsylvania, and is the largest enclosed shopping center in Lancaster County. It is situated at the intersection of U.S. Route 30 and Harrisburg Pike. The mall has over 170 stores and features Boscov's, JCPenney, Kohl's, Raymour & Flanigan, and Round 1 Bowling & Amusement.

With 170 stores, Park City Center is currently the fourth largest shopping mall in Pennsylvania.

== History ==
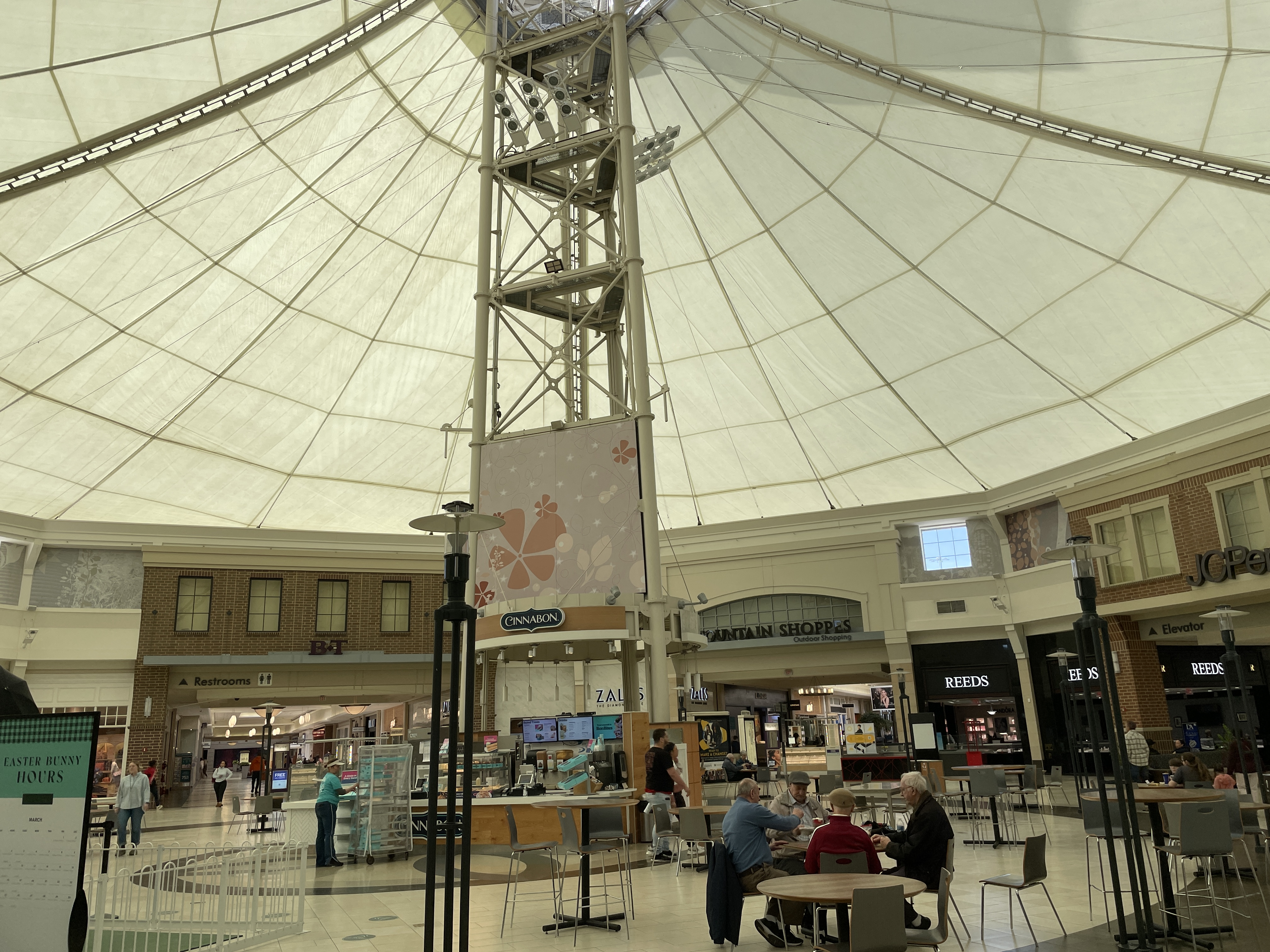
Center court of Park City Center

While often confused as being developed by The Rouse Company due to its design, the time it opened, and its current operator (Brookfield Properties), Park City Center was actually developed by the Park City Shopping Center Corporation, a joint venture between the Nassau Shopping Center Corporation and local Lancaster businessmen Melvin Hyman, Lawrence Hyman, and Lee Drunkenbrod.

The mall originally opened in 1971. The shape of the mall resembles a snowflake, with its stores occupying 8 corridors extending from the center. The roof in the center of the mall is a large white tent, and encloses the octagonal Center Court. The mall underwent a major renovation in 2008, which took 18 months and included updates to every part of the mall. During its early years Park City was also called "Mall of Four Seasons" because of the seasonal names given to the original four corridors leading to each anchor. Going clockwise from west to east was JCPenney in the two-story Winter quadrant, Sears in Spring, Gimbel's (later Pomeroy's then Boscov's) in Summer, and Watt & Shand (later Bon-Ton) in Autumn. The state of the art mall located in the heart of Pennsylvania Dutch Country was one of the first to have its own closed-circuit television. Studios for Park City Communications and Lancaster/York/Harrisburg CBS affiliate WLYH-TV 15 were located on the first floor in the Winter wing alongside an ice skating rink.

In 1985, the lower level had a major remodel/renovation removing the ice rink, golf course, movie theaters, ETC, and adding the Food Court and the anchor store, Clover.

In 1996, Clover closed their store at the mall due to an acquisition by one of its competitors May Department Store. Department Store, Kohls would open in the former Clover space on September 20, 1996.

Around 2007-2008, the latest major renovation occurred that remodeled most of the interior, and gained a new section called the Fountain Shoppes between the JCPenney and The Bon-Ton space that gained a center fountain, and stores like Coldstone Creamery, Banana Republic, and Starbucks.

In April 2018, The Bon-Ton store closed when the entire chain went out of business. In 2019, the mall announced plans to demolish The Bon-Ton anchor store and construct an open air entryway with two freestanding restaurants, a courtyard, and a new enclosed mall entrance. The plans were put on hold and eventually cancelled due to the onset of the COVID-19 pandemic.

In December 2018, Sears announced that it would close its anchor store. In August 2019, it was announced that the Sears anchor building would be remodeled to house a Round One Entertainment venue, which opened in 2020.

On November 6, 2024, Raymour & Flanigan Furniture and Mattress Store opened on both floors of the former Bon-Ton space.
