= Kendig C. Bare =

American politician (1913–1989)

Mayor of Lancaster, Pennsylvania
- In office 1951–1958
- Preceded by: Howard Bare
- Succeeded by: Thomas J. Monaghan
- In office 1950–1950
- Preceded by: Dale Cary
- Succeeded by: Howard Bare

Personal details
- Born: November 5, 1913
- Died: January 12, 1989 (aged 75)

Military service
- Allegiance: United States
- Years of service: 1950 – 1951
- Battles/wars: Korean War

Kendig C. Bare (November 5, 1913 – January 12, 1989) was an American politician.

== Career ==
As a youth, Kendig was involved in the Order of DeMolay, serving as an officer for Lancaster Chapter in 1932 and as chairman of the 1934 Conclave of the Associated Chapters of the Order of DeMolay in Pennsylvania. At that Conclave, he was elected state master councillor of Pennsylvania DeMolay, serving a one-year term. During his tenure, Bare began publication of the Keystone Crusader, a newsletter for all members of DeMolay in Pennsylvania. The Keystone Crusader remains in publication to this day.

Bare was the 31st mayor of Lancaster, Pennsylvania, from 1950 until 1958, except for an eight-month period (1950–1951) when he was called into military service in the Korean War. During Kendig's absence, his brother Howard Bare assumed the duties of mayor.

In honor of Bare, the City of Lancaster named the Public Safety building in his honor, however this facility is no longer in use.

Political offices
Preceded by Dale Cary	Mayor of Lancaster, Pennsylvania; 1950	Succeeded by Howard Bare
Preceded by Howard Bare	Mayor of Lancaster, Pennsylvania; 1951–1958	Succeeded by Thomas J. Monaghan
