= Thomas J. Monaghan (politician) =

American politician

Mayor of Lancaster, Pennsylvania
- In office 1958–1962
- In office 1966–1969
- In office 1970–1974

Pennsylvania Secretary of Commerce
- In office 1961–1963
- Governor: David L. Lawrence
- Preceded by: William R. Davlin
- Succeeded by: John K. Tabor

Personal details
- Born: Thomas Joseph Monaghan; July 26, 1914 Mahanoy City, Pennsylvania
- Died: August 2, 1992 (aged 78) Lancaster, Pennsylvania
- Party: Democratic
- Spouse: Sylvia Krick (m. 1944-his death)
- Children: 3

Thomas Joseph Monaghan (July 26, 1914 – August 2, 1992) was an American politician. Despite losing the 1953 mayoral election, Monaghan won in 1957 and went on to serve three terms as Mayor of Lancaster, Pennsylvania: his first term ran from 1958 to 1962, his second term ran from 1966 to 1969 and he won reelection for a third term that ran from 1970 to 1974. In 1961 and 1973, Monaghan ran for reelection but was defeated. Between 1961 and 1963 he served as Pennsylvania's Secretary of Commerce under Governor David L. Lawrence. Monaghan was indicted on one extortion and two tax evasion charges in 1975, but was convicted of only one charge of tax evasion.

== Early life ==
Thomas J. Monaghan was born on July 26, 1914, to Thomas J. Monaghan and Mary Monaghan in Mahanoy City, Pennsylvania. Monaghan served in the U.S. Navy between 1942 and 1945, in the fleet supply division during the South Pacific campaign of World War II.

== Political career ==
=== Mayor of Lancaster, Pennsylvania ===
==== Unsuccessful 1953 campaign ====
In the primary election in May 1953, Monaghan was nominated, without opposition, as the Democratic candidate for mayor. He ran against Republican Kendig C. Bare, who, being the incumbent mayor, was running for reelection. Monaghan promised prospective voters that he would improve the city's sewage and water facilities to accommodate its expanding boundaries, build a new police station, and eliminate slums and substandard housing. The general election took place in November 1953. Monaghan lost to Bare by 636 votes.

==== First term (1958-1962) ====
===== Campaign, election and inauguration =====
In March 1957, the Democratic City Committee unanimously endorsed Monaghan as their party's candidate for mayor; he was an ideal candidate, according to the committee, because he had a good deal of prior political experience and understood Lancaster's citizens' needs well. Monaghan accepted the endorsement, and on May 21 was nominated uncontested as Democratic candidate in the primary election. Monaghan's opponent was Harold W. Budding, a Republican.

Monaghan won the general election in November by 1,236 votes, becoming the first Democratic mayor of Lancaster since 1933, when James H. Ross defeated Edward Rhoads. Monaghan had a total of 10,389 votes to Budding's 9,153. He had gained favor from some Republican voters due to his apparent personal integrity and dedication to getting people, regardless of party, interested in government. Two of the council posts, three of the school board posts, and the positions of city treasurer and city controller were also won by Democrats.

He was sworn in on January 6, 1958, by incumbent mayor Kendig C. Bare. In his inaugural speech Monaghan stated that Democrats would be slow to adopt new policies. Monaghan presented to Bare the Red Rose Award, an award for "outstanding citizens" that Bare himself had established in 1950.

==== Unsuccessful reelection campaign ====
In March 1961 Monaghan began his campaign for another term. His opponent was George Coe, a Republican. Monaghan, who believed that voters had the right to know their candidates' views, offered Coe the chance to host a series of discussions with him. Coe, however, refused to; Richard A. Snyder, the chairman of Lancaster County's Republican Party, barred Coe from appearing alongside Monaghan. After Coe said he would fire certain officials if he were elected, Monaghan accused Coe and the Republican Party of trying to return the spoils system to the Lancaster government.

In the general election, which was counted on November 7, Coe won by 1,385 votes. Coe had earned 11,873 votes and Monaghan 10,488, although Monaghan briefly had the lead in the first returns. Monaghan congratulated Coe, with whom he claimed to be "well-enough acquainted", and said that he would help him transition into office.

==== Second term (1965-1969) ====
===== Campaign, election and inauguration =====
In March 1965, Monaghan accepted a unanimous nomination from the Democratic City Committee. His opponent Jack F. Tracy, a Republican who had once associated with George Coe's administration but since disavowed it, refused to debate Monaghan, because Tracy expected Monaghan to question him on the matter. Monaghan derided the Republican Party for "making false promises" and compared Tracy unfavorably to Barry Goldwater.

Monaghan won the 1965 mayoral election, which took place on November 2, by 565 votes. Monaghan had earned 10,621 votes and Tracy 10,056. After the election had ended but before the votes were counted, a victory parade extended 4 miles (6.4 km) through southern and southwestern Lancaster in anticipation of a Democratic victory. He was sworn in on the morning of January 3, 1966. His inauguration was accompanied by the creation of a city council to replace the commission system that had hitherto governed the city. The only Democratic member of the council, though, was its head T. R. Appel II.

==== Third term (1970-1974) ====
===== Campaign and reelection =====
In February 1969, Monaghan announced in a press conference that he would seek another term. He ran against Daniel S. Templeton, a councilman belonging to the Republican Party, and William L. Hershey of the Constitutional Party. Monaghan won by 656 votes; he earned 7,838 votes, Templeton 7,182 and Hershey 1,025.

===== Contract work kickbacks scandal =====
In 1973, the Philadelphia Grand Jury accused Monaghan of having accepted a series of payments, totalling over $20,000, from Thomas A. Graham, chairman of Meridian Engineering, Inc., from 1969 to 1972. Meridian Engineering, Inc. was a Philadelphia-based civil engineering firm that had been doing contract work for Lancaster. The payments were kickbacks, since the city had paid Meridian about $614,000 for three projects, including a sewer silo. At a grand jury presentment, Monaghan denied the allegations, whereas Graham corroborated them. A probe in 1975 into the allegations revealed that Monaghan was the only official involved in the payments.

Lancaster officials were shocked by the allegations, as they knew Monaghan to be an honest and upstanding person. Program Planner Paul P. Passaniti said, "In the two years I worked for [Monaghan], there's never been an incident to arouse any question". Public Safety Director Herbert C. Yost remarked, "I've known Tom for a long time, and if he says he's innocent of any wrong doing, then he's innocent in my estimation". Even Templeton, Monaghan's former opponent who had later become Director of Public Works, doubted the allegations. The scandal did not lead to the cancellation of a banquet held in January 1974 to bid him farewell after his third term ended; in fact, 570 people attended it.

In 1975, Monaghan was charged by a federal grand jury with two counts of understating his income on federal income tax returns in 1971 and 1972. He was charged, at the same time, with a count of extortion for allegedly coercing the kickbacks from Graham. Monaghan pleaded no contest. The extortion count and one of the counts of tax evasion were dropped. Monaghan was convicted of the remaining count of tax evasion, for which he was placed under probation for three years and fined $5,000.

=== Pennsylvania Secretary of Commerce ===
In November 1961 Governor Lawrence appointed Monaghan Secretary of Commerce to succeed William R. Davlin, who had died in October. Monaghan was sworn in on December 1, 1961.

=== Other positions ===
From 1979 to 1981 Monaghan was an administrator with the state treasurer's Bureau of Public Assistance Disbursements. He was also a Pennsylvania delegate to the White House Conference on Children and Youth, and a member of Governor Lawrence's Committee on Unemployment Compensation. During the 1960s, he was Lancaster County's Democratic campaign manager.

== Nonpolitical activities ==
Monaghan joined the 134th Lodge of the Benevolent and Protective Order of Elks in 1952, and in 1965 was named Elk of the Year by the lodge for his service to the Lancaster community. At various points in time he served as director of the Lancaster Citizen Scholarship Foundation, the Lancaster County Farm and Home Foundation, the Lancaster Sales and Marketing Executives Club, and the Central Pennsylvania Chapter of the National Arthritis Foundation. He served as director and president of the Lancaster County Boy Scout Council, chairman of both the Lancaster and Pennsylvania United Service Organizations and vice president of the Lancaster County Community Council.

== Personal life and death ==
Thomas Monaghan married Sylvia Krick, a nurse at the Lancaster General Hospital, in 1944 at St. Mary's Catholic Church. The wedding was officiated by Reverend George Brown. The best man was Monaghan's brother, Joseph Monaghan, and the maid of honor was Monaghan's cousin, Norma Morfing. The couple had three children: Thomas Jr., Charles P. and Mary.

Monaghan died on August 2, 1992, at his home in Lancaster after a long illness.

Political offices
Preceded by Kendig C. Bare	Mayor of Lancaster, Pennsylvania; 1958–1962	Succeeded by George Coe
Preceded by George Coe	Mayor of Lancaster, Pennsylvania; 1966–1974	Succeeded by Richard M. Scott
