= John Passmore (politician) =

American politician

John Passmore was an American politician. He served as the first mayor of Lancaster, Pennsylvania from 1818 to 1820. Resided at a colonial mansion built in 1750 by Thomas Poultney (merchant) on the corner of Shippen and East Orange Streets in Lancaster, PA. An historical marker was placed in front of this house in 1950.

Political offices
Preceded by Office established	Mayor of Lancaster, Pennsylvania; 1818–1820	Succeeded by Samuel Carpenter
