= John Piersol McCaskey =

J. P. McCaskey
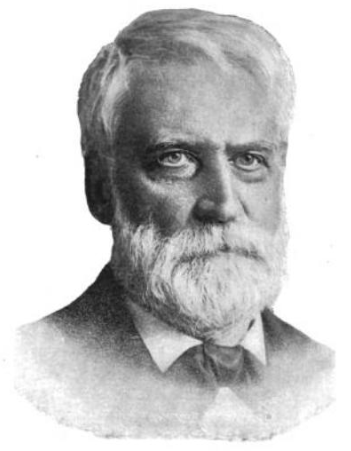

Mayor of Lancaster, Pennsylvania
- In office 1906 – January 3, 1910
- Preceded by: Chester Cummings
- Succeeded by: Frank B. McClain

Personal details
- Born: October 9, 1837 Gordonville, Pennsylvania
- Died: September 19, 1935 (aged 97) Lancaster, Pennsylvania

John Piersol McCaskey (October 9, 1837 – September 19, 1935), known as J. P. McCaskey, was an American educator, politician, textbook and songbook editor and publisher, and a journalist, among other things. He served as the 23rd Mayor of Lancaster, Pennsylvania, from 1906 to 1910. (Incorrect death year and/or mayoral years in articles cited: of) McCaskey admired Abraham Lincoln above all other famous historical figures, and he was a member of the Republican Party.

== Biography ==
McCaskey is most remembered in the field of education, and the high school in Lancaster, opened in 1938, is named in his honor. McCaskey taught in the Boys' High School beginning in 1855, and was teacher and principal there for 50 years with the exception of one year, 1857–1858, which he spent mostly in the old Evening Express printing office, studying the printing process. His work as editor of The Pennsylvania School Journal for 55 years gave him a platform from which to influence the curriculum (e.g., introduction of music, art, and astronomy)and to promote practices such as memory work in the evolving "common schools" across the state of Pennsylvania and beyond. Through The Journal, McCaskey and E. E. Higbee, state superintendent of public instruction, campaigned for Arbor Day to be celebrated in the Commonwealth's public schools starting in the spring of 1885. McCaskey had already introduced the celebration of Arbor Day to Pennsylvania by leading a program at his school in 1884. Over the next 20 years, he and the Lancaster High School, which included a girls' department, held two Arbor Days annually, complete with afternoon programs lasting sometimes 2-2 1/2 hours. Students and faculty planted over 9,000 trees all around the town. McCaskey considered his work as editor of the Journal his most important contribution, followed by his compilation of many songbooks which were sold throughout the United States. While he was very well loved and respected by his many students, who called themselves "Jack's boys," he ranked his accomplishments as a teacher and principal below his Journal editorship and songbooks. The most important goal of education, according to McCaskey, was the building of character. The inscription on his tombstone reflects that goal: "Builder of Men".

McCaskey was born on a farm near the village of Gordonville in Leacock Township, Lancaster County, Pennsylvania. Gordonville, Pennsylvania, on October 9, 1837. His father's family belonged to the Presbyterian Church, while his mother's family were members of the Episcopal Church. They attended services regularly at both churches. He learned to read at an early age before going to the old Zook schoolhouse, among the first "common schools" in Pennsylvania, and was required to read daily and often aloud from the Bible. By the time he was ten or eleven, he left home for the Oak Hill Academy in Paradise for one or two five-month terms. In May 1849, McCaskey began boarding with relatives in the city of Lancaster to attend one of the few public high schools opened in the state at that time. He studied first at a "secondary school" on Duke Street under a noted and influential teacher, Howard Worcester Gilbert, and then attended Boys' High, the male department of Lancaster High School, starting in 1850. However, he did not graduate with his class in 1855 because he left school early that year to get a job to help support his family. His father (William), mother (Margaret) and his six younger siblings were forced to move from the Leacock Township farm into Lancaster because of financial losses. Young J. P. began teaching at Boys' High in the fall of 1855 with neither a high school diploma nor any college work. This was possible because the public school system was just emerging and requirements for teachers were few: good scholarship and good character, both of which were qualities attested to by his teachers.

In 1860, McCaskey married Ellen Margaret Chase in Bath, New York. The couple had seven children, six natural(two of whom died as children and one as a young adult) and one foster child, a Jewish boy from Russia whom the McCaskeys took in and encouraged to grow in his faith. The McCaskeys attended St. James Episcopal Church in Lancaster; McCaskey served on the vestry for a record 66 years. Christmas was his favorite holiday. He was among the first to publish Christmas carols and songs in his songbooks, and included was "Jolly Old St. Nicholas," the verses of which Lancastrians incorrectly believed he had written. (Emily Huntington Miller wrote the text as a poem, "Lilly's Secret", which appeared in December 1865 in The Little Corporal; it was set to music most likely by James Ramsey Murray.)

One of McCaskey's brothers, William Spencer McCaskey, entered the U. S. Civil War at age 17, serving for its duration and fighting in many of the largest battles; he went on to have an illustrious career in the U. S. Army, retiring in 1907 as a major general. His life is recounted in a 2014 biography, Last Man Standing: William Spencer McCaskey, by Dennis Farioli, Ron Nichols, and Lee Noyes; J. P. McCaskey's life is chronicled in a 2015 biography, Lancaster's Good Man, John Piersol McCaskey, by Dolores Parsil.

McCaskey died at his home in Lancaster on September 19, 1935, just weeks shy of his 98th birthday. An early proponent of cremation, his remains are interred in Greenwood Cemetery in Lancaster, Pennsylvania.

Political offices
Preceded by Chester Cummings	Mayor of Lancaster, Pennsylvania; 1906–1910	Succeeded by Frank B. McClain
