= Edwin Smeltz =

American politician

Edwin Smeltz was an American politician. He served as the nineteenth mayor of Lancaster, Pennsylvania from 1894 to 1898.

Political offices
Preceded by Robert Clark	Mayor of Lancaster, Pennsylvania; 1894–1898	Succeeded by Simon Shissler
