= John MacGonigle =

American politician

John MacGonigle was an American politician. He served as the fourteenth mayor of Lancaster, Pennsylvania from 1877 to 1884.

Political offices
| Preceded by William Stauffer | Mayor of Lancaster, Pennsylvania; 1877–1884 | Succeeded by David Rosenmiller |
