= Mindy Myers =

American Democratic political strategist and campaign executive

- Born: April 12, 1976 (age 50); Lancaster, Pennsylvania, U.S.
- Education: American University
- Occupations: Political campaign executive Democratic strategist

Mindy Elizabeth Myers (born April 12, 1976) is an American Democratic political strategist and campaign executive. Myers was the first female executive director Democratic Senatorial Campaign Committee in the 2018 cycle.

Raised in Lancaster, Pennsylvania, she graduated from American University and immediately started working in the Capitol Hill office of Senator Tom Daschle of South Dakota, then Senate Majority Leader.

She led the Democratic Senatorial Campaign Committee's independent expenditures for the 2016 election cycle. She has previously served as campaign manager and chief of staff to Senator Elizabeth Warren, campaign manager of Sheldon Whitehouse's U.S. Senate election in Rhode Island in 2006 and Richard Blumenthal in U.S. Senate election in Connecticut in 2010, and interned as a special assistant in the Clinton administration White House Office of Legislative Affairs before becoming deputy director for constituency outreach for Al Gore 2000 presidential campaign and served as the state director in New Hampshire for Barack Obama 2008 presidential campaign. In the political climate surrounding the 2016 American general election, she was named by Politico as one of Washington, D.C.'s 30 most powerful people, one of just 5 women on that list.
