= Harry L. Trout =

American politician

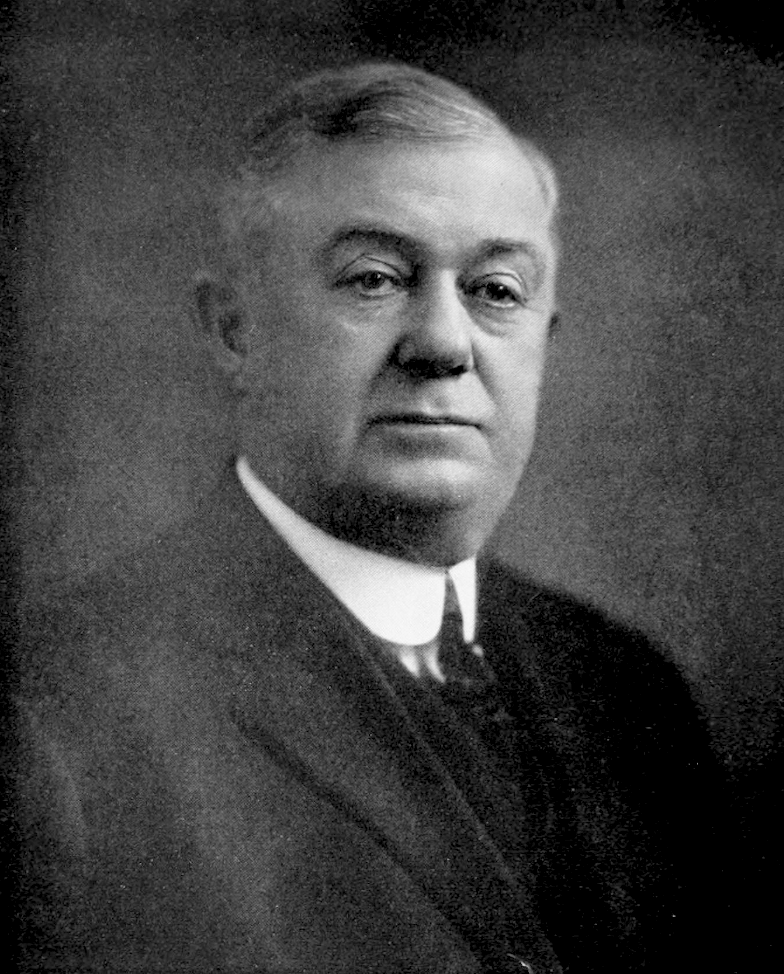

Mayor of Lancaster, Pennsylvania
- In office January 6, 1915 – January 5, 1920

Personal details
- Born: October 28, 1853; Lancaster, Pennsylvania
- Died: January 5, 1920 (aged 66); Lancaster, Pennsylvania
- Political party: Republican
- Spouse: Sarah E. Colby (m. 1875)
- Children: 1
- Occupation: Bookbinder, politician
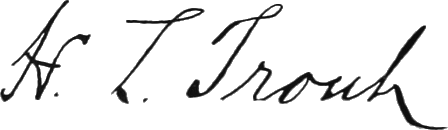
- Signature

Harry L. Trout (1853–1920) was an American politician. He served as the 25th mayor of Lancaster, Pennsylvania from 1915 to 1920.

== Biography ==
Harry L. Trout was born in Lancaster, Pennsylvania on October 28, 1853. He attended public schools, and apprenticed to become a bookbinder.

He married Sarah E. Colby on September 2, 1875, and they had one daughter.

A Republican, he held a number of public offices, beginning in 1889. He was appointed mayor of Lancaster in 1915 to complete the term of Frank B. McClain, who had been elected lieutenant governor.

Trout was reelected as mayor, but died from a bronchial infection at Lancaster General Hospital on January 5, 1920, one hour after he would have been sworn into office.

Political offices
Preceded by Frank B. McClain	Mayor of Lancaster, Pennsylvania; 1915–1920	Succeeded by Horace E. Kennedy
