= George Coe (mayor) =

Mayor of Lancaster, Pennsylvania

George Coe (February 22, 1906 - February 8, 1992) was an American politician. He served as the mayor of Lancaster, Pennsylvania from 1962 to 1966. As mayor he pushed for demolition of a large number of buildings in downtown Lancaster to facilitate redevelopment.

Political offices
Preceded by Thomas J. Monaghan	Mayor of Lancaster, Pennsylvania; 1962–1966	Succeeded by Thomas J. Monaghan
