= J. P. McCaskey High School =

Location
- 445 N Reservoir St; Lancaster County, Pennsylvania; United States; 40.04704°N 76.29081°W

Information
- Type: Public high school
- Established: 1938
- School district: School District of Lancaster
- Superintendent: Keith Miles
- Principal: Justin Reese
- Teaching staff: 179.85 (FTE)
- Enrollment: 2,620 (2022–2023)
- Student to teacher ratio: 14.57
- Colors: Red and black
- Mascot: Red Tornado Tornado Man
- Website: J. P. McCaskey

J. P. McCaskey High School is a public high school located in Lancaster, Pennsylvania, United States. Located on the east side of Lancaster, it is named after John Piersol McCaskey, a local educator.

The campus consists of two buildings: J. P. McCaskey, which is usually referred to either as "JPM" or simply "JP"; and McCaskey East, which is referred to as "East". Also on the McCaskey campus are a number of playing fields (for soccer, baseball, softball, and field hockey), tennis courts, and a stadium. Nearby are Wickersham Elementary School and Lincoln Middle School.

== History ==
John Piersol McCaskey High School opened on 3 May 1938, accepting Lancaster city's first gender-integrated class of students. The high school was named for John McCaskey, a local educator, composer, and politician.

The construction is a product of the post-Depression Works Progress Administration. The original façade, lobby, and auditorium are set in Art Deco style. The main building was subsequently extended.

In 2021, the outside of the JP McCaskey Building was used in an episode of the Disney Channel TV show Bunk'd, as well as a trailer for the 2023 film Bottoms.

== Notable alumni ==
- Madeline Anderson (1945), filmmaker, first African-American woman to direct a documentary film, first African-American woman to executive produce a nationally distributed television show
- John Darrenkamp (class of 1953; dropped out in 1952 to join the military), baritone at the Metropolitan Opera
- Barney Ewell, sprinter, 1948 Summer Olympics silver medalist
- Jennifer Gareis (1988), actress
- David Greene, 1994, host of NPR's Morning Edition
- Jerry Johnson, professional basketball player
- Mindy Myers, campaign manager
- John Parrish, former MLB pitcher
- Lamar Patterson, National Basketball Association (NBA) player and second round draft pick
- Franklin J. Schaffner (valedictorian, Class of 1938), film director (Planet of the Apes, Patton, Nicholas and Alexandra)
- Matt Watson, former MLB outfielder
- Kris Wilson, former NFL tight end
