= Lancaster County Convention Center =

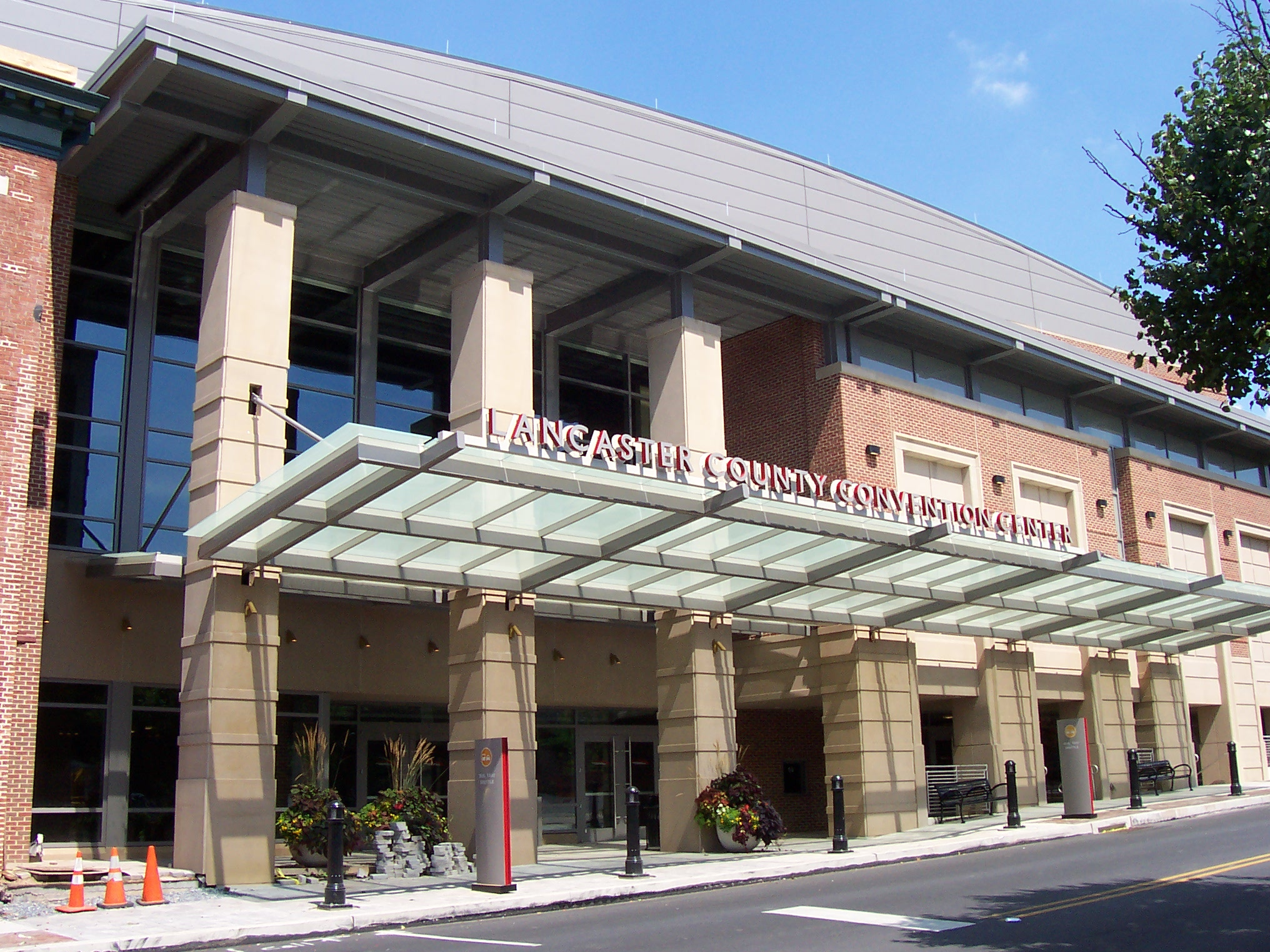
- Interactive map of the Lancaster County Convention Center area

General information
- Location: 3 East Vine Street; Lancaster, PA 17603
- Coordinates: 40°2′15″N 76°18′17″W
- Construction started: 2006
- Completed: 2009

Design and construction
- Architect: Cooper Carry

Other information
- Seating capacity: 6,500 (Freedom Hall)

Website
- www.lancasterconventioncenter.com

The Lancaster County Convention Center (LCCC) is a publicly owned convention center in the city of Lancaster, Pennsylvania, USA. With initial site preparation in late 2006 and completion in the summer of 2009, the Lancaster County Convention Center is one of several projects intended to help revitalize downtown Lancaster.

The convention center is integrated with the Lancaster Marriott at Penn Square, Lancaster's tallest building. The architecture of the hotel lobby and "shared space" includes the façade of the former Watt & Shand department store building, which was at one time listed on the National Register of Historic Places

The approximate cost to construct the hotel and convention center was $177.6 million.

== History ==
In 1997, the Lancaster Campaign and the Economic Development Action Group, made up of community members, contracted with LDR International in an effort to stimulate economic revitalization of the city of Lancaster, called the Economic Development Action Agenda (EDAA) for Prince and South Duke Streets and downtown Lancaster. The plan identified projects and strategies important to the development of these commercial areas. The list was reduced to seventeen strategies, including separate proposals to develop a new conference center and to revitalize Lancaster's historic Watt & Shand building, which had been vacant since The Bon-Ton Department Store departed in 1995. The action agenda focused on the construction of a new conference center and the redevelopment of Lancaster Square, including the former Armstrong/Lancaster Square Building and the Hotel Brunswick. Separately, the plan recommended adaptive reuse of the Watt & Shand Building to include a mix of retail stores and offices, with one or more venues designed to attract tourists.

A Convention Center Task Force formed in 1998 to address the EDAA, called for the development of a meeting facility. As a result, the EDAA evolved to become a plan for a convention center and hotel at Penn Square. Task force members approached Penn Square Partners (PSP), who purchased the dormant Watt & Shand Building in February 1998, about the potential of developing the property into a privately owned hotel.

After a marketing study of the hotel and convention center idea, Penn Square Partners and the Lancaster Foundation jointly petitioned the Lancaster County Commissioners to create a Convention Center Authority and to initiate a hotel room tax to support the project. On 15 September 1999, the Lancaster County Convention Center Authority (LCCCA) was established, and local officials appointed a seven-member volunteer board of directors.

In 2001, the LCCCA and PSP formalized their relationship for the purpose of developing, designing, building, and operating a convention center and hotel.

=== Funding ===
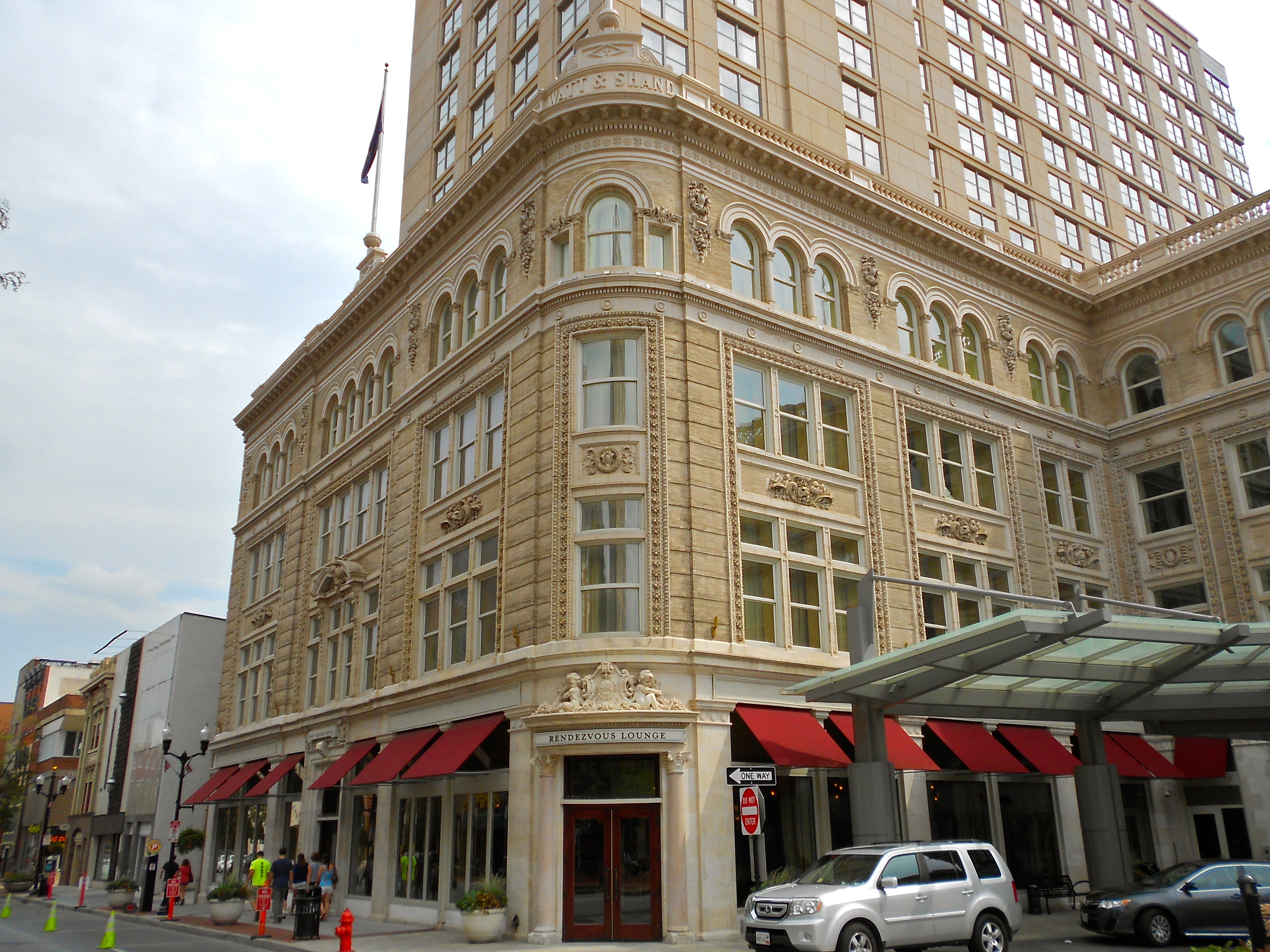
Watt & Shand building in 2012

In January 2000, Lancaster County Commissioners imposed a 3.9% tax on hotel room rentals to generate the funding necessary to construct and market the convention center. Twenty percent of the revenue from this tax is used to fund campaigns aimed at attracting convention center visitors and tourists. In March 2000, local hoteliers filed the first of several lawsuits challenging the constitutionality of the hotel room tax. As a result of litigation, the LCCC was put on hold for three years. In April 2003, the project was substantially redesigned and enlarged, and a new marketing report was completed in 2006. In early 2006, Penn Square Partners sold the former Watt & Shand property to the Redevelopment Authority of the City of Lancaster. The building, which originally sold for $1.25 million, was purchased by the city for $7 million. Construction bonds are expected to be repaid with lease payments from future earnings of the hotel.

Although original proposals for the convention center project focused on the adaptive reuse of the historic Watt & Shand building, which was listed on the National Register of Historic Places, only the façade was retained and the entire building was demolished in 2006 and 2007. The reason given by the LCCCA, and Tom Smithgall of High Industries, master planner for the project, was that the building could not be rehabilitated.

== Project partners ==
- Cooper Carry, Inc.: Atlanta, Georgia architectural firm contracted to design the LCCC and Lancaster Marriott at Penn Square.
- George K. Baum & Company: A West Conshohocken-based advisory firm under contract to assist the LCCCA with financial matters.
- High Associates, Ltd.: Master developer of the Lancaster County Convention Center and the Lancaster Marriott at Penn Square
- High Construction Company: The Lancaster-based construction manager for the Lancaster Marriott at Penn Square.
- Interstate Hotels and Resorts: A hotel management company hired by Penn Square Partners and the Lancaster County Convention Center Authority to manage the Lancaster Marriott at Penn Square and the convention center, respectively.
- MM Architects, Inc.: Lancaster-based architectural firm contracted to design a parking garage to enhance downtown parking.
- Reynolds Construction, Inc.: Harrisburg-based construction manager for the convention center project.
- Empire Services: Reading-based demolition and excavation company for the convention center project.

== Thaddeus Stevens & Lydia Hamilton Smith Historic Site ==
The Lancaster County Convention Center development includes the exterior preserved residence and law office of Thaddeus Stevens and his confidant Lydia Hamilton Smith's boarding houses. The internal development of these two historic sites is integrated into the Vine Street entrance and lobby of the convention center.

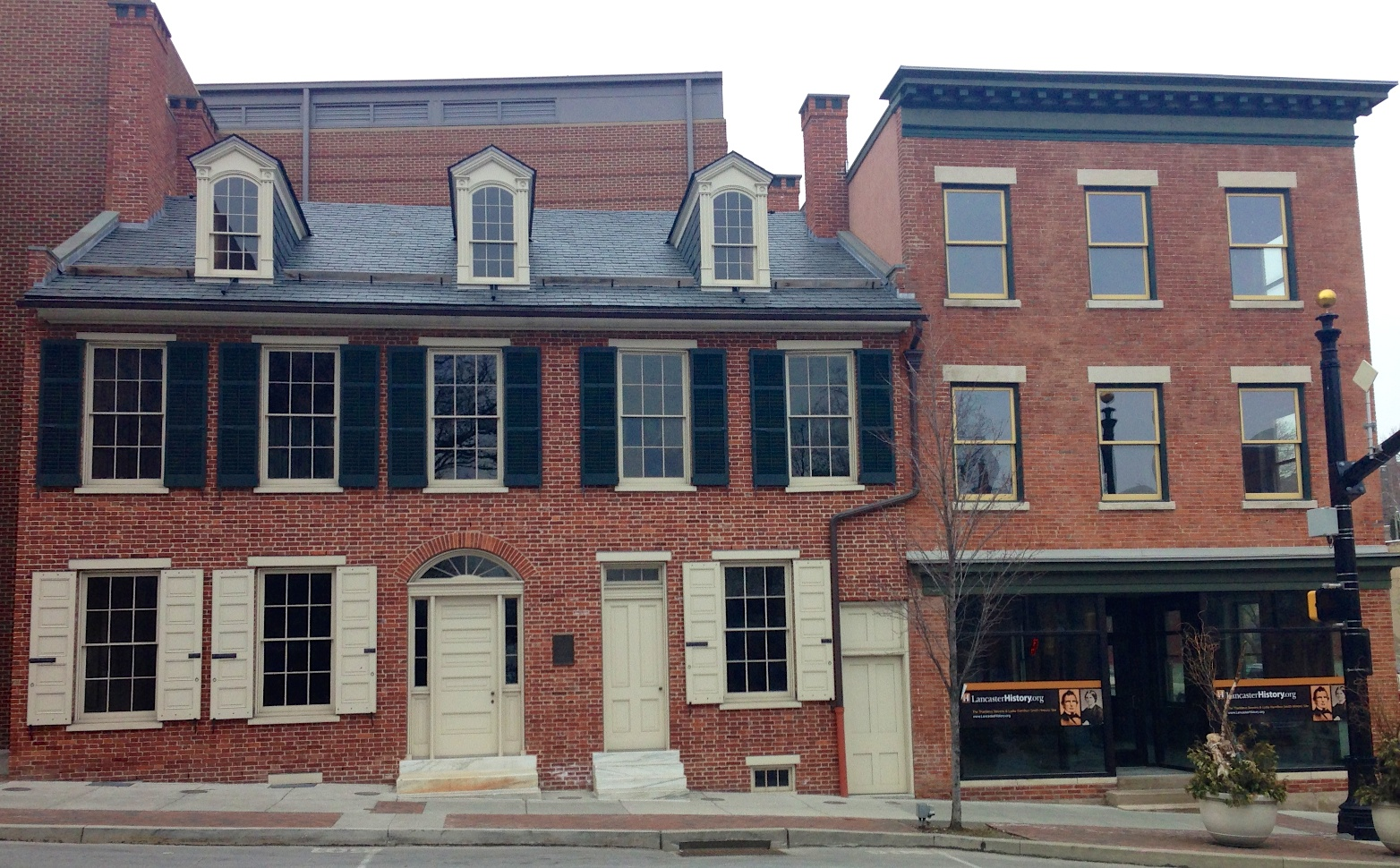
Residence and law office of Thaddeus Stevens

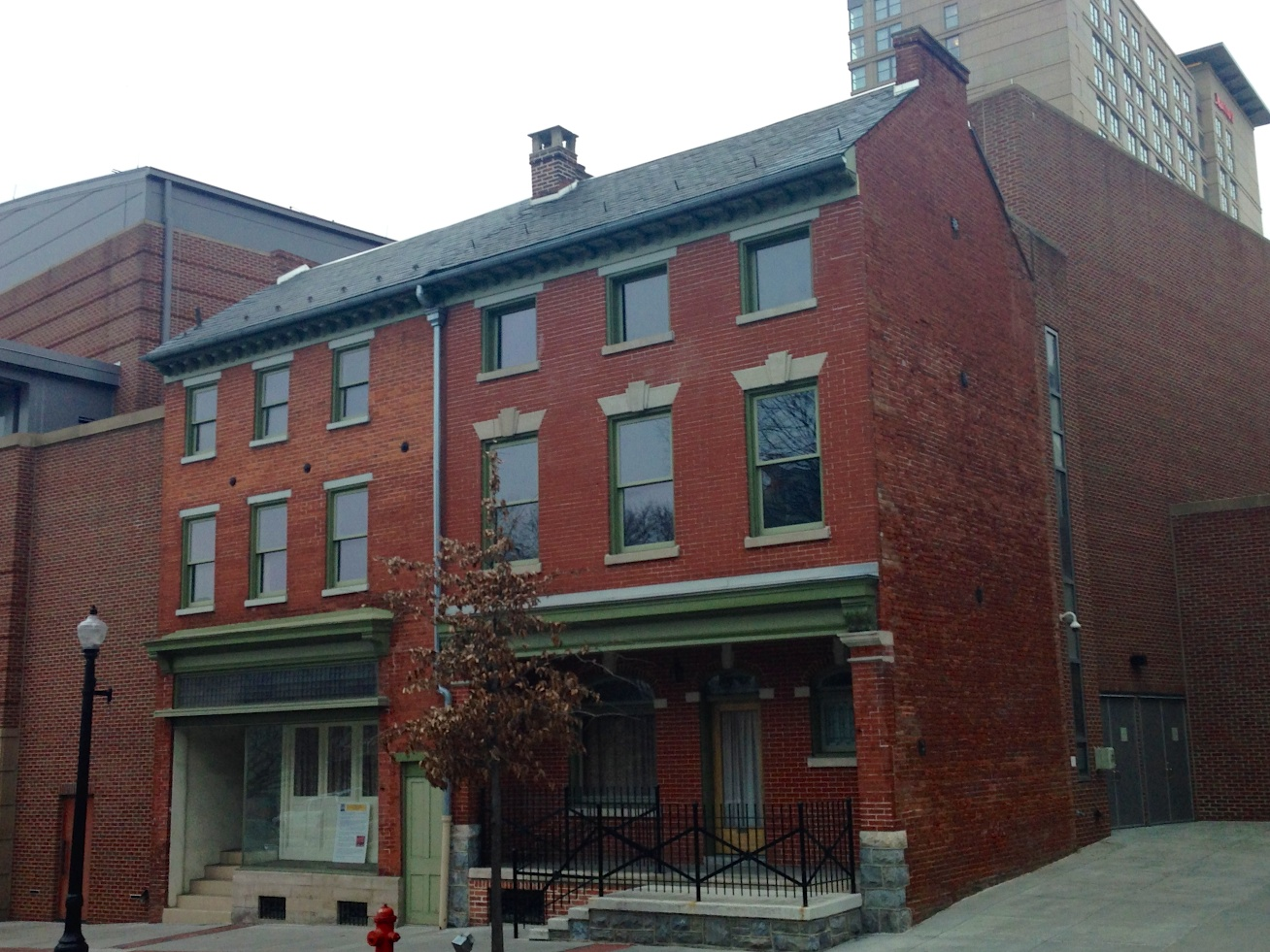
Exterior of the Lydia Hamilton Smith house
