= List of mayors of Lancaster, Pennsylvania =

Mayor of Lancaster, Pennsylvania
- Incumbent; Jaime Arroyo since January 5, 2026
- Inaugural holder: John Passmore
- Formation: 1818

The Mayor of Lancaster, Pennsylvania, is the elected, chief executive of the city of Lancaster, Pennsylvania, USA. The mayor is elected for a four-year term. The city of Lancaster, Pennsylvania has had 44 mayors since 1818.

== Mayors of Lancaster ==
Mayor	Party	Term start	Term end
John Passmore		1818	1820
Samuel Carpenter		1821	1823
Nathaniel Lightner		1824	1830
John Mathiot		1831	1843
Michael Carpenter		1843	1851
Christian Kieffer		1852	1854
Jacob Albright		1855	1855
John Zimmerman		1856	1857
Thomas Henry Burrowes		1858	1858
George Sanderson		1859	1868
William Atlee		1869	1871
Fredrick Pyfer		1871	1873
William Stauffer		1873	1877
John MacGonigle		1877	1884
David Rosenmiller		1884	1886
William Morton		1886	1888
Edward Edgerly		1888	1890
Robert Clark		1890	1894
Edwin Smeltz		1894	1898
Simon Shissler		1898	1900
Henry Muhlenberg		1900	1902
Chester Cummings		1902	1906
John Piersol McCaskey		1906	1910
Frank B. McClain		1910	1915
Harry L. Trout		1915	1920
Horace E. Kennedy		1920	1922
Frank Musser		1922	1930
T. Warren Metzger		1930	1934
James Ross		1934	1938
Dale Cary		1938	1950
Kendig C. Bare		1950	1950
Howard Bare		1950	1951
Kendig C. Bare		1951	1958
Thomas J. Monaghan		1958	1962
George Coe		1962	1966
Thomas J. Monaghan		1966	1974
Richard M. Scott		1974	1979
Albert Wohlsen		1979	1980
Arthur E. Morris	Republican	1980	1990
Janice Stork	Democratic	1990	January 1998
Charlie Smithgall	Republican	January 1998	January 3, 2006
Rick Gray	Democratic	January 3, 2006	January 2, 2018
Danene Sorace	Democratic	January 2, 2018	January 5, 2026
Jaime Arroyo	Democratic	January 5, 2026	Incumbent

== See also ==
- Old City Hall (Lancaster, Pennsylvania)
- Lancaster history
