= 2022 Pennsylvania gubernatorial election =

- November 8, 2022
- Turnout: 60.6%
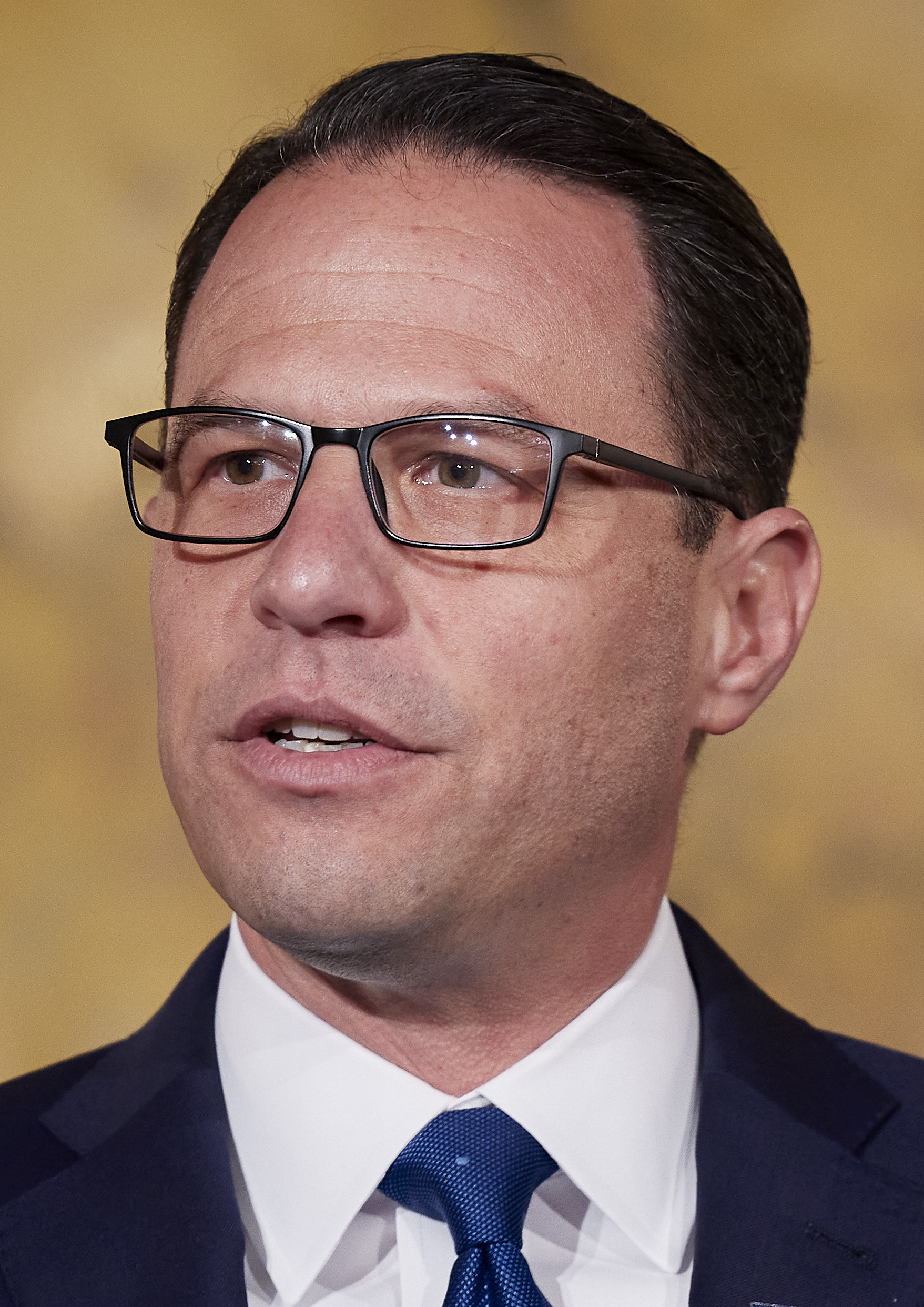

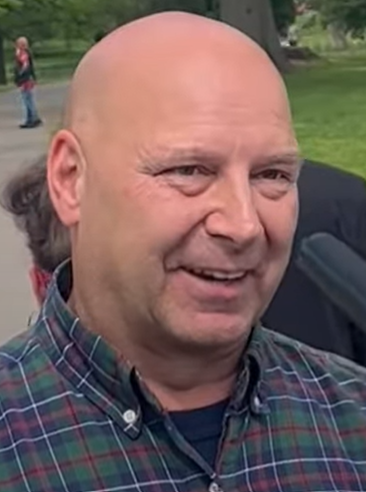
Nominee	Josh Shapiro	Doug Mastriano
Party	Democratic	Republican
Running mate	Austin Davis	Carrie DelRosso
Popular vote	3,031,137	2,238,477
Percentage	56.49%	41.71%
- Shapiro: 40–50% 50–60% 60–70% 70–80% 80–90% >90% Mastriano: 40–50% 50–60% 60–70% 70–80% 80–90% >90% Tie: 40–50% 50% No data
Governor before election
Tom Wolf
Democratic
Elected Governor
Josh Shapiro
Democratic

The 2022 Pennsylvania gubernatorial election was held on November 8, 2022, to elect the governor and lieutenant governor of Pennsylvania. Democratic state attorney general Josh Shapiro defeated Republican state senator Doug Mastriano to win his first term in office. Shapiro succeeded Democratic incumbent Tom Wolf, who was term limited.

In the primaries on May 17, 2022, Shapiro was unopposed for the Democratic nomination. Mastriano, who was endorsed by Donald Trump, won the Republican nomination with 44% of the vote over former representative Lou Barletta and former U.S. attorney William McSwain. Although the election was expected to be competitive due to Pennsylvania's reputation as a swing state, Mastriano had trouble fundraising, made few media appearances, committed multiple gaffes, was accused of antisemitism against Shapiro, and generated controversy from his far-right positions. Mastriano's struggles helped Shapiro take a strong polling lead that continued up to the election.

Shapiro defeated Mastriano by almost 15 points, the largest margin for a non-incumbent candidate for Pennsylvania governor since 1946, and earned the most votes of a Pennsylvania gubernatorial candidate at just over three million. His large margin of victory was credited with helping down-ballot Democrats in concurrent elections. The victory also marked the first time since 1844 that the Democratic Party won three consecutive gubernatorial elections in Pennsylvania, and the first since 1950 that any party had done so. According to exit polls, Shapiro won independent voters by a 31-point margin, which contributed to Mastriano's defeat.

== Democratic primary ==
=== Governor ===
==== Campaign ====
Pennsylvania Attorney General Josh Shapiro ran unopposed and was described as the Democratic Party's presumptive nominee by The Philadelphia Inquirer and the Pennsylvania Capital-Star early in the campaign, with the Capital-Star reporting that efforts to recruit a primary challenger to the left of Shapiro had failed.

==== Candidates ====
===== Nominee =====
- Josh Shapiro, Pennsylvania Attorney General (2017–2023), former member of the Montgomery County Board of Commissioners (2012–2017), former state representative for PA-153 (2005–2012)

===== Failed to qualify for ballot access =====
- Tega Swann, Christian minister

===== Declined =====
- Brendan Boyle, U.S. representative for Pennsylvania's 2nd congressional district (2019–present) and former U.S. representative for Pennsylvania's 13th congressional district (2015–2019) (ran for re-election)
- John Fetterman, lieutenant governor of Pennsylvania (2019–2023), candidate for the U.S. Senate in 2016 (ran for the U.S. Senate)
- Sara Innamorato, state representative for the 21st legislative district (2019–2023)
- Jim Kenney, mayor of Philadelphia (2016–2024)
- Joe Torsella, former Pennsylvania state treasurer (2017–2021)

==== Endorsements ====
Josh Shapiro

U.S. senators

- Bob Casey Jr., U.S. senator from Pennsylvania (2007–2025)

State executives

- Ed Rendell, former governor of Pennsylvania (2003–2011), chair of the National Governors Association (2008–2009)
- Tom Wolf, governor of Pennsylvania (2015–2023)

U.S. representatives

- Matt Cartwright, U.S. representative from Pennsylvania's 8th congressional district (2019–present) and 17th district (2013–2019)
- Madeleine Dean, U.S. representative from Pennsylvania's 4th congressional district (2019–present)
- Dwight Evans, U.S. representative from Pennsylvania's 3rd congressional district (2019–present) and 2nd district (2016–2019)
- Susan Wild, U.S. representative from Pennsylvania's 7th congressional district (2019–present) and 15th district (2018–2019)

State legislators

- Jessica Benham, state representative from the 36th district (2021–present)
- Danilo Burgos, state representative from the 197th district (2019–present)
- Michael B. Carroll, state representative from the 118th district (2007–2022)
- Jay Costa, minority leader of the Pennsylvania Senate (2011–present), state senator from the 43rd district (1996–present)
- Austin Davis, state representative from the 35th district (2018–2023) and candidate for lieutenant governor
- Dave Delloso, state representative from the 162nd district (2019–present)
- Marty Flynn, state senator from the 22nd District (2021–present)
- Dan Frankel, state representative from the 23rd district (1999–present)
- Pat Harkins, state representative from the 1st district (2007–present)
- Vincent Hughes, state senator from the 7th district (1994–present)
- Tim Kearney, state senator from the 26th district (2019–present)
- Malcolm Kenyatta, state representative from the 181st district (2019–present) and candidate for U.S. Senate
- Patty Kim, state representative from the 103rd district (2013–present)
- Emily Kinkead, state representative from the 20th district (2020–present)
- Joanna McClinton, state representative from the 191st district (2015–present), minority leader of the Pennsylvania House of Representatives (2020–2023)
- Robert Merski, state representative from the 2nd district (2019–present)
- Gerald Mullery, state representative from the 119th district (2011–present)
- Eddie Day Pashinski, state representative from the 121st district (2007–present)
- Brian Sims, state representative from the 182nd district (2013–2022)
- Sharif Street, state senator from the 3rd district (2017–present)
- Anthony H. Williams, state senator from the 8th District (1999–present), minority whip of the Pennsylvania Senate (2011–present)
- Mike Zabel, state representative from the 163rd district (2019–present)

Local officials

- George Brown, mayor of Wilkes-Barre (2020–present)
- Darrell L. Clarke, president of the Philadelphia City Council (2012–present), member of the Philadelphia City Council from the 5th district (1999–present)
- Paige Gebhardt Cognetti, Mayor of Scranton (2020–present)
- Kathy Dahlkemper, Erie County executive (2014–2022) and former U.S. representative from Pennsylvania's 3rd congressional district (2009–2011)
- Rich Fitzgerald, Allegheny County executive (2012–present)
- Larry Krasner, District Attorney of Philadelphia (2018–present)

Party officials

- Marcel Groen, former chair of the Pennsylvania Democratic Party (2015–2018)

Labor unions

- AFL–CIO
- Allegheny County Labor Council
- Amalgamated Transit Union
- American Federation of State, County and Municipal Employees
- Eastern Atlantic States Regional Council of Carpenters
- Greater Pennsylvania Regional Council of Carpenters
- International Brotherhood of Boilermakers, Local #154
- International Brotherhood of Electrical Workers
- International Brotherhood of Teamsters
- International Union of Operating Engineers
- Laborers' International Union of North America
- SEIU
- Sheet Metal Workers' International Association
- UFCW Local #1776 Keystone State

Organizations

- Democratic Governors Association
- Democratic Jewish Outreach PA
- Giffords
- Jewish Democratic Council of America
- MeidasTouch
- NARAL Pro-Choice America
- Penn State College Democrats
- Pennsylvania Democratic Party
- Planned Parenthood Action Fund

Individuals

- Mark Kelly Tyler, pastor of Mother Bethel A.M.E. Church
- Marc Zumoff, former play-by-play announcer for the Philadelphia 76ers

==== Results ====
Democratic primary (governor)
Party	Candidate	Votes	%
Democratic	Josh Shapiro	Unopposed	
Total votes		1,227,151	100.0%

=== Lieutenant governor ===
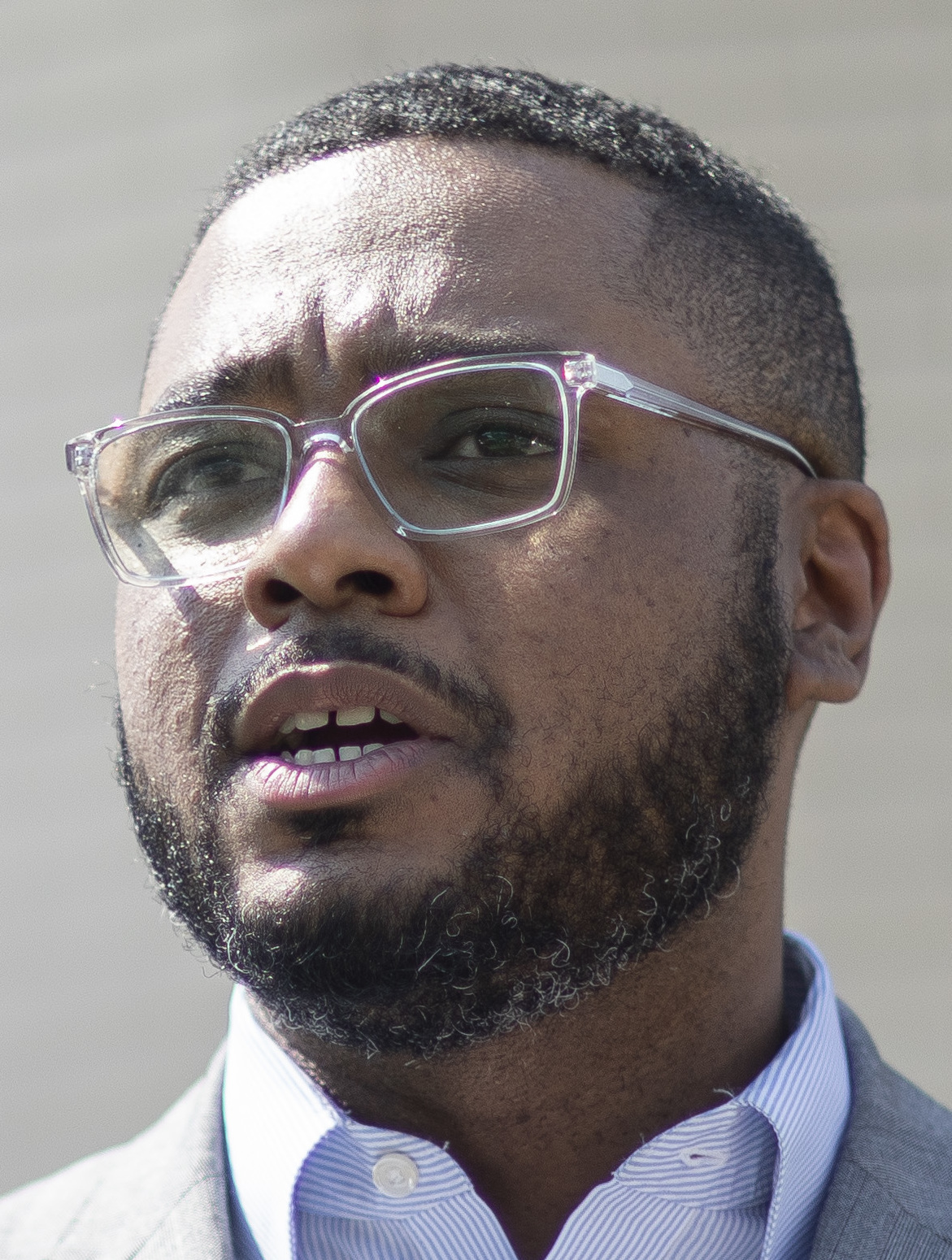
Democratic nominee Austin Davis

==== Candidates ====
===== Nominee =====
- Austin Davis, state representative from the 35th district (2018–2022)

===== Eliminated in primary =====
- Brian Sims, state representative from the 182nd district (2012–2022)
- Ray Sosa, candidate for lieutenant governor of Pennsylvania in 2018

===== Declined =====
- Elizabeth Fiedler, state representative for the 184th legislative district (2019–present)
- Steve Irwin, banking commissioner of Pennsylvania (2006–2014) (ran unsuccessfully for Congress)
- Michelle Kenney, activist for Black Lives Matter and mother of Antwon Rose
- Malcolm Kenyatta, state representative for the 181st legislative district (2019–present) (ran unsuccessfully for the U.S. Senate, endorsed Shapiro)
- Joe Torsella, former Pennsylvania state treasurer (2017–2021)

===== Withdrew =====
- Patty Kim, state representative for the 103rd legislative district (2013–present), Harrisburg City Council member (2006–2012) (running for re-election)
- Mark Pinsley, Lehigh County controller (2019–present) (running for State Senate)

==== Endorsements ====
Austin Davis

State executives

- Ed Rendell, former governor of Pennsylvania (2003–2011) and chair of the National Governors Association (2008–2009)
- Josh Shapiro, Pennsylvania attorney general (2017–2023)
- Tom Wolf, Governor of Pennsylvania (2015–2023)

State legislators

- Jay Costa, minority leader of the Pennsylvania Senate (2011–present), state senator from the 43rd district (1996–present)

State representatives

- Joanna McClinton, minority leader of the Pennsylvania House of Representatives (2020–2023)

Local officials

- Darrell L. Clarke, president of the Philadelphia City Council (2012–present), Philadelphia City Councillor from the 5th district (1999–present)
- Ed Gainey, Mayor of Pittsburgh (2022–2026)

Labor unions

- SEIU

Newspapers and other media

- The Philadelphia Tribune

Organizations

- Pennsylvania Democratic Party
Brian Sims

Organizations

- LGBTQ Victory Fund

==== Results ====
Results by county Davis: 40–50%; 50–60%; 60–70%; 70–80%; 80–90%

Democratic primary (lieutenant governor)
Party	Candidate	Votes	%
Democratic	Austin Davis	768,141	63.00%
Democratic	Brian Sims	305,959	25.09%
Democratic	Ray Sosa	145,228	11.91%
Total votes		1,219,328	100.0%

== Republican primary ==
In the Republican primary, leading candidates included former congressman Lou Barletta, Montgomery County commissioner Joe Gale, political strategist Charlie Gerow, former U.S. Attorney William McSwain, state Senator Doug Mastriano, and former Delaware County councilmember Dave White.

Several key issues, such as school choice, natural gas exploration in PA, and tax reform, were early themes in the Pennsylvania GOP debates before the primary election, while voting laws in the Commonwealth were a later topic of debate.

Due to his support for overturning the results of the 2020 presidential election and his role in the January 6 U.S. Capitol attack, many Republicans expressed concern about Mastriano's ability to win the general election. As a result, the party encouraged other candidates to drop out to allow for an alternative to Mastriano to gain traction.

On May 12, president pro tempore of the Pennsylvania Senate Jake Corman dropped out and endorsed Barletta. On May 14, former president Donald Trump endorsed Mastriano. On May 12, The Philadelphia Inquirer reported that former U.S. Representative Melissa Hart would also drop out and endorse Barletta. Mastriano won the primary with almost 44% of the vote, defeating his nearest competitor, Barletta, by over 23 points.

The New York Times reported in mid-June that Mastriano had been aided in the primary by the Pennsylvania Democratic Party and Shapiro's campaign with an ad equating him to Trump. Shapiro defended the move, saying the ad demonstrated the contrast between him and Mastriano as part of the general election campaign. The Times saw it as part of a nationwide strategy to gain easier opponents in November.

=== Governor ===
==== Candidates ====
===== Nominee =====
- Doug Mastriano, state senator from SD-33 (2019–present) and candidate for PA-13 in 2018

===== Eliminated in primary =====
- Lou Barletta, U.S. representative from PA-11 (2011–2019), Republican nominee for U.S. Senate in 2018
- Joe Gale, member of the Montgomery County Board of Commissioners (2016–present), candidate for lieutenant governor of Pennsylvania in 2018
- Charlie Gerow, vice-chair of the American Conservative Union
- William McSwain, U.S. attorney for the Eastern District of Pennsylvania (2018–2021)
- Dave White, member of the Delaware County Council (2012–2017)
- Nche Zama, cardiothoracic surgeon

===== Withdrew =====
- Shawn Berger, restaurant owner
- Guy Ciarrocchi, CEO of the Chester County Chamber of Business & Industry (2014–present), Chief of staff to Lieutenant Governor Jim Cawley (2011–2014) (ran unsuccessfully for U.S. House)
- Jake Corman, state senator from District 34 (1999–2022), President pro tempore of the Pennsylvania Senate (2020–2022) (endorsed Barletta)
- Melissa Hart, U.S. representative from Pennsylvania's 4th congressional district (2001–2007), state senator from District 40 (1991–2001) (endorsed Barletta)
- Scott Martin, state senator from District 13 (2017–present)
- Jason Monn, former mayor of Corry (2015–2016) (ran for State Representative)
- Jason Richey, attorney at K&L Gates (endorsed McSwain)
- Mike Turzai, speaker of the Pennsylvania House of Representatives (2015–2020), state representative from HD-28 (2001–2020), candidate for Governor of Pennsylvania in 2018
- John Ventre, Westmoreland County Republican Committeeman

===== Declined =====
- Ryan Aument, state senator for the 36th senatorial district (2015–present)
- Jeff Bartos, businessman and nominee for lieutenant governor of Pennsylvania in 2018 (ran unsuccessfully for U.S. Senate)
- Jim Cawley, former lieutenant governor of Pennsylvania (2011–2015) (endorsed Barletta)
- Laureen Cummings, former Lackawanna County commissioner and Republican nominee for Pennsylvania's 17th congressional district in 2012
- Brian Fitzpatrick, U.S. representative from Pennsylvania's 1st congressional district (2019–present) (ran for re-election)
- Daniel J. Hilferty, former CEO of Independence Blue Cross
- Mike Kelly, U.S. representative from Pennsylvania's 16th congressional district (2011–present) (ran for re-election)
- Dan Laughlin, state senator for the 49th senatorial district (2017–present)
- Paul Mango, businessman and candidate for governor of Pennsylvania in 2018
- Dan Meuser, U.S. representative from Pennsylvania's 9th congressional district (2019–present) (running for re-election, endorsed Barletta)
- Jason Ortitay, state representative for the 46th legislative district (2015–present) (ran for re-election)
- Pat Toomey, U.S. senator

==== Debate ====
2022 Pennsylvania gubernatorial election Republican primary debate
No.	Date	Host	Moderator	Link	Participants							
Key: P Participant N Non-invitee												
Key: P Participant N Non-invitee					Lou Barletta	Jake Corman	Joe Gale	Charlie Gerow	Melissa Hart	Doug Mastriano	William McSwain	Dave White
1	Apr 27, 2022	ABC 27/WPXI	Dennis Owens; Lisa Sylvester		P	N	N	N	N	P	P	P

==== Endorsements ====
Lou Barletta

Executive branch officials

- Steve Bannon, former White House Chief Strategist and Senior Counselor to the President (2017)
- Bill Stepien, former White House Director of Political Affairs (2017–2018)

U.S. senators

- Rick Santorum, U.S. senator from Pennsylvania (1995–2007) and candidate for president in 2012 and 2016 (previously endorsed Corman)

U.S. representatives

- Melissa Hart, U.S. representative from Pennsylvania's 4th congressional district (2001–2007)
- Ronny Jackson, U.S. representative from Texas's 13th congressional district (2021–present) and former Physician to the President (2013–2018)
- Fred Keller, U.S. representative from Pennsylvania's 12th congressional district (2019–2023)
- Tom Marino, U.S. representative from Pennsylvania's 12th congressional district (2019) and 10th district (2011–2019)
- Dan Meuser, U.S. representative from Pennsylvania's 9th congressional district (2019–present)
- Keith Rothfus, former U.S. representative from Pennsylvania's 12th congressional district (2013–2019)

State officials

- Jim Cawley, former lieutenant governor of Pennsylvania (2011–2015)
- Mark Schweiker, former governor of Pennsylvania (2001–2003)

State legislators

- Lisa Baker, state senator from SD-20 (2007–present)
- Karen Boback, state representative from 117th district (2007–present)
- Jake Corman, President pro tempore of the Pennsylvania Senate (2020–2022), state senator from SD-34 (1999–2022)
- Doyle Heffley, state representative from the 122nd district (2011–present)
- Aaron Kaufer, state representative from 120th district (2015–present)
- Kurt Masser, state representative from the 107th district (2011–present)

Organizations

- Oil and Gas Workers Association
Jake Corman (withdrawn)

Executive branch officials

- Kellyanne Conway, former senior counselor to the president (2017–2020)

U.S. senators

- ~~Rick Santorum, former U.S. senator from Pennsylvania (1995–2007) and candidate for President in 2012 and 2016~~ (switched endorsement to Barletta after Corman withdrew)
Charlie Gerow

U.S. representatives

- Newt Gingrich, former U.S. representative from Georgia's 6th congressional district (1979–1999), former Speaker of the United States House of Representatives (1995–1999)
- G.T. Thompson, U.S. representative from Pennsylvania's 15th congressional district (2019–present) and 5th district (2009–2019)
- Robert Smith Walker, former U.S. representative from Pennsylvania's 16th congressional district (1977–1997)

Organizations

- American Conservative Union
Doug Mastriano

U.S. presidents

- Donald Trump, 45th president of the United States (2017–2021)

Executive branch officials

- Michael Flynn, former National Security Advisor (2017)

Local officials

- Rudy Giuliani, former mayor of New York City (1994–2001)

Organizations

- Gab, alt-tech social media service

Individuals

- Jenna Ellis, legal advisor to former President Donald Trump
- Mike Lindell, founder and CEO of MyPillow
William McSwain

U.S. senators

- Pat Toomey, U.S. senator from Pennsylvania (2011–2023)

Party officials

- Robert Gleason, former chair of the Pennsylvania Republican Party (2006–2017)
Jason Richey (withdrawn)

Individuals

- Mike Ditka, former head coach of the Chicago Bears (1982–1992)
Dave White

Executive branch officials

- Richard Grenell, former special presidential envoy for Serbia and Kosovo Peace Negotiations (2019–2021), former U.S. Ambassador to Germany (2018–2020), and former acting Director of National Intelligence (2020)

State legislators

- Dan Laughlin, state senator from the 49th district (2017–present)
- Kim Ward, state senator from the 39th district (2009–present), Majority Leader of the Pennsylvania Senate (2020–present)
Declined to endorse

Organizations

- Pennsylvania Republican Party

Newspapers and other media

- The Philadelphia Inquirer

==== Polling ====
Graphical summary

Source of poll aggregation	Dates administered	Dates updated	Lou Barletta	Jake Corman	Doug Mastriano	William McSwain	Dave White	Other (Note: Calculated by taking the difference of 100% and all other candidates combined.)	Margin
Real Clear Politics	May 3–16, 2022	May 17, 2022	20.3%	2.7%	34.3%	15.3%	9.8%	17.6%	Mastriano +14.0

Poll source	Date(s) administered	Sample size (Note: Key: A – all adults RV – registered voters LV – likely voters V – unclear)	Margin of error	Lou Barletta	Jake Corman	Scott Martin	Doug Mastriano	William McSwain	Dave White	Other	Undecided
The Trafalgar Group (R)	May 14–16, 2022	1,195 (LV)	± 2.9%	25%	–	–	37%	17%	10%	6% (Note: Gerow with 4%; Gale with 3%)	5%
Emerson College	May 14–15, 2022	1,000 (LV)	± 3.0%	22%	2%	–	34%	12%	9%	7% (Note: Gerow with 3%; Hart with 2%; Gale and Zama with 1%)	15%
Susquehanna Polling & Research (R)	May 12–15, 2022	400 (LV)	± 4.9%	15%	1%	–	29%	18%	8%	6% (Note: Gerow with 3%; Hart, Gale, and "Other" with 1%; Zama with 0%)	24%
	May 13, 2022	Hart withdraws from the race									
	May 12, 2022	Corman withdraws from the race									
The Trafalgar Group (R)	May 6–8, 2022	1,080 (LV)	± 3.0%	18%	5%	–	28%	14%	15%	9% (Note: Hart with 4%, Gale with 3%, Gerow with 2%)	11%
Fox News	May 3–7, 2022	1,001 (LV)	± 3.0%	17%	5%	–	29%	13%	11%	9% (Note: Hart with 4%; Gale with 2%; Gerow, Zama, and "Other" (volunteered response) with 1%)	15%
Franklin & Marshall College	April 20 – May 1, 2022	325 (RV)	± 6.9%	11%	1%	–	20%	12%	8%	11% (Note: "Someone else" with 5%; Hart and Zama with 2%; Gale and Gerow with 1%)	34%
The Trafalgar Group (R)	April 11–13, 2022	1,074 (LV)	± 3.0%	19%	3%	–	22%	17%	11%	8% (Note: Hart with 4%, Gale and Zama with 2%, Gerow with 1%)	19%
Franklin & Marshall College	March 30 – April 10, 2022	317 (RV)	± 6.6%	10%	2%	–	15%	12%	5%	14% (Note: "Someone else" with 7%, Gale and Hart with 3%, Gerow with 1%, Zama with 0%)	40%
Eagle Consulting Group (R)	April 7–9, 2022	502 (LV)	± 4.4%	11%	–	–	19%	13%	7%	6%	44%
Emerson College	April 3–4, 2022	1,000 (LV)	± 3.0%	20%	4%	–	19%	8%	12%	11% (Note: Gale, Gerow, and Hart with 3%; Zama with 2%)	27%
Emerson College	March 26–28, 2022	372 (LV)	± 5.0%	12%	2%	–	16%	6%	6%	8% (Note: Gale and Hart with 3%; Gerow with 2%; Zama with 0%)	49%
Fox News	March 2–6, 2022	517 (LV)	± 4.0%	19%	6%	3%	18%	11%	14%	2% (Note: Zama and "Other" (volunteered response) with 1%)	25%
The Trafalgar Group (R)	February 1–4, 2022	1,070 (LV)	± 3.0%	24%	5%	4%	20%	4%	–	14%	29%
Public Policy Polling (D) (Note: Poll sponsored by the Democratic Governors Association)	November 9–10, 2021	648 (LV)	± 3.8%	14%	4%	3%	18%	2%	1%	4% (Note: Gale with 3%; Richley with 1%)	56%
Susquehanna Polling & Research (R)	September 24–30, 2021	313 (LV)	± 5.6%	27%	–	6%	–	0%	–	6% (Note: "None/other" with 4%; Gale and Richey with 1%; Ciarrocchi, Gerow, Laughlin, and Zama with 0%)	60%
WPA Intelligence (R) (Note: Poll sponsored by Club for Growth Action)	May 10–12, 2021	826 (LV)	± 3.4%	16%	–	–	19%	–	–	17% (Note: "Someone else" with 10%; "Other" with 7%)	49%
Susquehanna Polling & Research (R)	February 16–24, 2021	272 (LV)	± 5.9%	20%	–	–	11%	3%	–	8% (Note: Meuser with 3%, Cawley with 2%, "None/other" with 1%; Gale and Richey with 1%)	60%

==== Results ====
Results by county Mastriano: 30–40%; 40–50%; 50–60%; 60–70%; 70–80%; 80–90%; Barletta: 40–50%; 50–60%; 70–80%; McSwain: 30–40%; White: 50–60%

Republican primary (governor)
Party	Candidate	Votes	%
Republican	Doug Mastriano	591,240	43.81%
Republican	Lou Barletta	273,252	20.25%
Republican	William McSwain	212,886	15.78%
Republican	Dave White	129,058	9.56%
Republican	Melissa Hart (withdrawn) (Note: Withdrew after deadline, remained on ballot)	54,752	4.06%
Republican	Joe Gale	27,920	2.07%
Republican	Jake Corman (withdrawn)	26,091	1.93%
Republican	Charlie Gerow	17,922	1.33%
Republican	Nche Zama	16,238	1.20%
Total votes		1,349,359	100.00%

=== Lieutenant governor ===
==== Candidates ====
===== Nominee =====
- Carrie DelRosso, state representative for HD-33 (2021–2022), Member of Oakmont Borough Council (2018–2021)

===== Eliminated in primary =====
- Jerry Carnicella, candidate for state representative for HD-72 in 2018 and 2020 and for state senator in SD-35 in 2016
- Jeff Coleman, state representative for HD-60 (2001–2004), founder of Churchill Strategies
- Teddy Daniels, candidate for Pennsylvania's 8th congressional district in 2020
- Russ Diamond, state representative for HD-102 (2015–present)
- Chris Frye, Mayor of New Castle, Pennsylvania (2019–present)
- Angela Grant, school director for the Jersey Shore Area School District (2019–present)
- Rick Saccone, state representative for HD-39 (2011–2019), nominee for Pennsylvania's 18th congressional district in 2018
- Clarice Schillinger, executive director of Back to School PA PAC

==== Declined ====
- Brandon Flood, former secretary of the Pennsylvania Board of Pardons (2019–2021) (endorsed Coleman)

==== Endorsements ====
Teddy Daniels

State legislators

- Doug Mastriano, state senator from the 33rd district (2019–present)
Jeff Coleman

U.S. senators

- Pat Toomey, U.S. senator from Pennsylvania (2011–present)

Individuals

- Brandon Flood, former secretary of the Pennsylvania Board of Pardons (2019–2021)
Russ Diamond

Organizations

- Stand for Health Freedom

==== Results ====
DelRosso: 10–20%; 20–30%; 30–40%; 40–50%; Saccone: 20–30%; 30–40%; Daniels: 10–20%; 20–30%; 30–40%; 50–60%; Schillinger: 20–30%; 40–50%; Coleman: 20–30%; 30–40%; 40–50%; Diamond: 60–70%; Brown: 20–30%; 40–50%; Frye: 20–30%; 50–60%

Republican primary (lieutenant governor)
Party	Candidate	Votes	%
Republican	Carrie DelRosso	318,970	25.59%
Republican	Rick Saccone	195,774	15.71%
Republican	Teddy Daniels	150,935	12.11%
Republican	Clarice Schillinger	148,442	11.91%
Republican	Jeff Coleman	126,072	10.11%
Republican	James Jones	113,966	9.14%
Republican	Russ Diamond	74,265	5.96%
Republican	John Brown	59,267	4.75%
Republican	Chris Frye	58,752	4.71%
Total votes		1,246,443	100.00%

== Libertarian nomination ==
The Libertarian Party nominees qualified for the general election ballot on August 1.

=== Governor ===
==== Nominee ====
- Matt Hackenburg, aerospace computer engineer

==== Eliminated in board vote ====
- Nicole Shultz, auditor of Windsor Township, York County (2022–present) and treasurer of the Libertarian Party of Pennsylvania (2021–2022) (originally ran for Lieutenant Governor; running as the Keystone nominee for Lieutenant Governor)

==== Withdrew ====
- Joe Soloski, public accountant and nominee for state representative from the 81st district in 2018 and state treasurer in 2020 (running as the Keystone nominee)

=== Lieutenant governor ===
==== Nominee ====
- Tim McMaster, IT analyst, farmer, and nominee for state senator from the 48th district in 2021

==== Withdrew ====
- Nicole Shultz, auditor of Windsor Township, York County (2022–present) and treasurer of the Libertarian Party of Pennsylvania (2021–2022) (ran for Governor)

== Green convention ==
The Green Party nominees qualified for the general election ballot on August 1.

=== Governor ===
==== Nominee ====
- Christina DiGiulio, environmental activist and former analytical chemist

==== Withdrew ====
- Christina Olson, small business owner and co-chair of the Green Party of Pennsylvania

=== Lieutenant governor ===
==== Nominee ====
- Michael Bagdes-Canning, mayor of Cherry Valley (2022–present), former member of the Cherry Valley Borough Council (1989–2022), and nominee for state representative from the 64th district in 2016 and 2020

== Keystone nomination ==
=== Governor ===
==== Nominee ====
- Joe Soloski (Keystone nominee), public accountant and Libertarian nominee for state representative from the 81st district in 2018 and state treasurer in 2020 (originally ran as a Libertarian)

==== Withdrew ====
- Eddie Wenrich (independent), store manager (ran for state representative)

=== Lieutenant governor ===
==== Nominee ====
- Nicole Shultz (Keystone nominee), auditor of Windsor Township, York County (2022–present) and treasurer of the Keystone Party of Pennsylvania (2022–present) (originally ran as a Libertarian for lieutenant governor and later governor)

== General election ==
=== Campaign ===
Attorney General Josh Shapiro ran a progressive campaign emphasizing protecting abortion rights, voter rights, and raising the state's minimum wage to $15 an hour. On criminal justice issues, Shapiro promised to sign a bill abolishing the death penalty having previously supported it, but also faced criticism from some left-wing voters for adopting a "tough on crime" image. In addition, he has openly feuded with Philadelphia District Attorney Larry Krasner.

State Senator Doug Mastriano positioned himself as a staunch ally of former president Donald Trump, promoting conspiracy theories about the 2020 election, defense of Confederate monuments, arming school teachers with firearms, and disregarding COVID-19 safety protocols. Mastriano also drew accusations of antisemitism for using anti-semitic dogwhistles against Shapiro. One of Mastriano's most vocal supporters was Andrew Torba, the CEO of far-right social media website Gab, a website on which the perpetrator of the Tree of Life Synagogue shooting posted before committing the massacre. Torba donated $500 to the Mastriano campaign, and Mastriano himself told the Gab founder in an interview, "Thank God for what you've done."

No debate was held during the general election, as Shapiro and Mastriano were unable to come to an agreement on how to debate. In addition, Mastriano did not release his first general election ads until October, while the more well-funded Shapiro had already spent $18.6 million in television broadcasting by that time. These factors, combined with Mastriano's refusal to talk to major media outlets and decision to ban journalists from campaign rallies, severely limited his voter outreach.

=== Predictions ===
Source	Ranking	As of
The Cook Political Report	Likely D	September 29, 2022
Inside Elections	Lean D	October 7, 2022
Sabato's Crystal Ball	Likely D	September 28, 2022
Politico	Likely D	October 25, 2022
RCP	Lean D	November 2, 2022
Fox News	Likely D	November 1, 2022
538	Solid D	October 28, 2022
Elections Daily	Likely D	November 7, 2022

=== Post-primary endorsements ===
Josh Shapiro (D)

Executive branch officials

- Joe Biden, president of the United States (2021–2025)
- Michael Chertoff, former secretary of homeland security (2005–2009) (Republican)
- Kamala Harris, vice president of the United States (2021–2025)
- Bill Kristol, former chief of staff to the vice president (1989–1993) (Independent)
- Patrick Murphy, former under secretary of the army (2016–2017)
- Barack Obama, former president of the United States (2009–2017)
- Jim Schultz, associate White House counsel (2017) (Republican)

U.S. senators

- Cory Booker, New Jersey (2013–present)

Statewide officials

- Joe Conti, former chief executive officer of the Pennsylvania Liquor Control Board (2006–2013) (Republican)
- Roy Cooper, governor of North Carolina (2017–2025)
- John Fetterman, lieutenant governor of Pennsylvania (2019–2023)
- Robert Jubelirer, former lieutenant governor of Pennsylvania (2001–2003) (Republican)
- Beverly D. Mackereth, former secretary of the Pennsylvania Department of Public Welfare (2013–2015) (Republican)
- Brad Mallory, former Pennsylvania secretary of transportation (1995–2002) (Republican)
- Phil Murphy, governor of New Jersey (2018–2026)
- Sandra Schultz Newman, former justice of the Pennsylvania Supreme Court (1996–2006) (Republican)
- J. B. Pritzker, governor of Illinois (2019–present)

U.S. representatives

- Bob Brady, former PA-01 (1998–2019)
- Liz Cheney, WY-AL (2017–2023) (Republican)
- Charlie Dent, former PA-15 (2005–2018) (Republican) (previously declined to endorse)
- Mike Doyle, PA-18 (1995–2022)
- Jim Greenwood, former PA-08 (1993–2005) (Republican)
- Chrissy Houlahan, PA-06 (2016–present)
- Adam Kinzinger, IL-16 (2011–2023)(Republican)
- Conor Lamb, PA-17 (2018–2023)
- Mary Gay Scanlon, PA-05 (2019–present)

State legislators

- Aerion Abney, state representative from the 19th district (2022–present)
- Jane S. Baker, state representative from the 134th district (2001–2002) (Republican)
- Ryan Bizzarro, state representative from the 3rd district (2013–present)
- Donna Bullock, state representative from the 195th district (2015–present)
- Raymond Bunt, state representative from the 147th district (1983–2006) (Republican)
- J. Scot Chadwick, state representative from the 110th district (1985–2000) (Republican)
- Mario Civera, state representative from the 164th district (1980–2010) (Republican)
- Lita Indzel Cohen, former state representative from the 148th district (1993–2002) (Republican)
- Maria Collett, state senator from the 12th district (2019–present)
- Scott Conklin, state representative from the 77th district (2007–present)
- Elizabeth Fiedler, state representative from the 184th district (2019–present)
- Mike Hanna, state representative from the 76th district (1991–2019), Democratic Whip of the Pennsylvania House of Representatives (2011–2019)
- Jordan A. Harris, state representative from the 186th district (2013–present), Democratic Whip of the Pennsylvania House of Representatives (2019–present)
- David Heckler, state senator from the 10th district, state representative from the 143rd district (1987–1993)
- Mary Isaacson, state representative from the 175th district (2019–present)
- James B. Kelly III, state representative from the 28th district (1971–1976) (Republican)
- Rick Krajewski, state representative from the 188th district (2021–present)
- Summer Lee, state representative from the 34th district (2019–2023) and 2022 Democratic nominee for Pennsylvania's 12th congressional district
- Robert Matzie, state representative from the 16th district (2009–present)
- Jennifer O'Mara, state representative from the 165th district (2019–present)
- Darisha Parker, state representative from the 198th district (2020–present)
- Marguerite Quinn, state representative from the 143rd district (2007–2019) (Republican)
- Nikil Saval, state senator from the 1st district (2020–present)
- Melissa Shusterman, state representative from the 157th district (2019–present)
- Jared Solomon, state representative from the 202nd district (2017–present)
- Dave Steil, former state representative from the 31st district (1993–2008) (Republican)

Local officials

- Michael Bloomberg, mayor of New York City (2002–2013) and co-founder and CEO of Bloomberg L.P.
- Morgan Boyd, Lawrence County Commissioner Chairman (2020–present) (Republican)
- Kendra Brooks, member of the Philadelphia City Council from the at-large district (2020–present) (Working Families)
- Allan Domb, member of the Philadelphia City Council (2016–2022)
- Steven Fulop, mayor of Jersey City (2013–present)
- Ed Gainey, mayor of Pittsburgh (2022–present)
- Jamie Gauthier, member of the Philadelphia City Council from the 3rd District (2020–2022)
- Derek S. Green, member of the Philadelphia City Council from the at-large district (2016–present)
- Helen Gym, member of the Philadelphia City Council from the at-large district (2016–present)
- Jim Kenney, mayor of Philadelphia (2016–present), member of the Philadelphia City Council from the at-large district (1992–2015)
- Michael Nutter, mayor of Philadelphia (2008–2016), member of the Philadelphia City Council from the 4th district (1992–2006)
- Dennis M. O'Brien, former member of the Philadelphia City Council (2012–2016), former state representative from the 169th district (1977–1980; 1983–2012), former speaker of the Pennsylvania House of Representatives (2007–2008) (Republican)
- Maria Quiñones-Sánchez, member of the Philadelphia City Council (2008–2022)
- Rebecca Rhynhart, Philadelphia City Controller (2018–present)
- Katherine Gilmore Richardson, at-large member of the Philadelphia City Council (2020–present)
- Danene Sorace, mayor of Lancaster (2018–present)
- Isiah Thomas, member of the Philadelphia City Council At-Large (2020–present)

Labor unions

- Association of Pennsylvania State College and University Faculties
- Fraternal Order of Police
- Pennsylvania Association of Staff Nurses and Allied Professionals
- Pennsylvania Professional Firefighters Association
- Pennsylvania State Education Association
- Pennsylvania State Troopers Association
- Philadelphia Federation of Teachers
- United Mine Workers
- United Steelworkers

Organizations

- AAPI Victory Fund
- Bend the Arc
- Black Economic Alliance
- CeaseFirePA
- Clean Water Action
- Conservation Voters of Pennsylvania
- Democrats Abroad
- Democratic Senatorial Campaign Committee
- Emgage
- Everytown for Gun Safety
- Gen-Z for Change
- Human Rights Campaign
- The Lincoln Project
- MoveOn
- National Democratic Redistricting Committee
- National Wildlife Federation
- PennEnvironment
- Republican Accountability Project
- Ricky’s Pride PAC
- Sierra Club
- Stonewall Democrats-Pittsburgh chapter

Newspapers and other media

- The Daily Item
- The Patriot-News
- The Philadelphia Inquirer
- The Philadelphia Tribune
- Pittsburgh Post-Gazette
- The Tribune-Democrat
- The York Dispatch
- USA Today

Individuals

- Nina Ahmad, 2020 Democratic nominee for Pennsylvania Auditor General
- Jackson Browne, musician and activist
- Larry Ceisler, political strategist
- Peter Coyote, actor, screenwriter and narrator
- Franco Harris, former professional football player for the Pittsburgh Steelers and collegiate football player for the Penn State Nittany Lions
- Reid Hoffman, co-founder of LinkedIn
- Karla Jurvetson, physician and philanthropist
- Sam Katz, Republican nominee for mayor of Philadelphia in 1999 and 2003 (Independent)
- Sarah Longwell, conservative political strategist and publisher of The Bullwark (Republican)
- Mary L. Trump, psychologist, author and niece of former president Donald Trump
- Shannon Watts, founder of Moms Demand Action
- Robert Wilburn, former CEO of the Gettysburg National Battlefield Museum Foundation and former president of Indiana University of Pennsylvania
Doug Mastriano (R)

Executive branch officials

- Ben Carson, former HUD secretary (2017–2021)

State officials

- Ron DeSantis, governor of Florida (2019–present) and former U.S. Representative from Florida's 6th congressional district (2013–2018)
- Stacy Garrity, treasurer of Pennsylvania (2021–present)

U.S. senators

- Rick Santorum, U.S. senator from Pennsylvania (1995–2007), U.S. representative from Pennsylvania's 17th congressional district (1991–1995)

U.S. representatives

- Lou Barletta, U.S. representative from Pennsylvania's 11th congressional district (2011–2019)
- John Joyce, U.S. representative from Pennsylvania's 13th congressional district (2019–present)
- Fred Keller, U.S. representative from Pennsylvania's 12th congressional district (2019–2023), former state representative from the 85th district (2011–2019)
- Mike Kelly, U.S. representative from Pennsylvania's 16th congressional district (2019–present), former U.S. representative from Pennsylvania's 3rd congressional district (2011–2019)
- Dan Meuser, U.S. representative from Pennsylvania's 9th congressional district (2019–present), former secretary of the Pennsylvania Department of Revenue (2011–2015)
- Scott Perry, chair of the House Freedom Caucus (2022–2024), U.S. representative from Pennsylvania's 10th congressional district (2019–present), former U.S. representative from Pennsylvania's 4th congressional district (2013–2019)
- Guy Reschenthaler, U.S. representative for Pennsylvania's 14th congressional district (2019–present), former state senator from the 37th district (2015–2019)
- Lloyd Smucker, U.S. representative from Pennsylvania's 11th congressional district (2019–present), former U.S. representative from Pennsylvania's 16th congressional district (2017–2019), member of the Pennsylvania State Senate from the 13th district (2009–2016)
- Marjorie Taylor Greene, U.S. representative from Georgia's 14th congressional district (2021–present)
- G.T. Thompson, U.S. representative from Pennsylvania's 15th congressional district (2019–present), former U.S. representative from Pennsylvania's 5th congressional district (2009–2019), ranking member of the House Agriculture Committee (2021–present)

State legislators

- Stephanie Borowicz, Pennsylvania state representative from the 76th district (2019–present)
- Kim Ward, Pennsylvania state senator from the 39th district (2009–present) and majority leader of the Pennsylvania Senate (2020–present)

Local officials

- Bernard Kerik, former Police Commissioner of New York City (2000–2001) and pardoned felon

Individuals

- Kathy Barnette, political commentator and candidate for U.S. Senate in Pennsylvania in 2022
- Joe D'Orsie, candidate for Pennsylvania state representative from the 47th district in 2022
- Sean Feucht, Christian gospel singer and former worship leader at Bethel Church
- Kari Lake, former television news anchor and Republican nominee for Governor of Arizona in 2022 election
- Mehmet Oz, television personality and 2022 Republican senate nominee
- Jack Posobiec, alt-right political activist, conspiracy theorist and provocateur
- Andrew Torba, white supremacist and CEO of Gab
- Donald Trump Jr., businessman and former television personality

Organizations

- America First Secretary of State Coalition
- Gun Owners of America
- National Right to Life Committee
- NRA Political Victory Fund
- Pennsylvania Republican Party
Declined to endorse

Executive branch officials

- Tom Ridge, U.S. secretary of Homeland Security (2003–2005), Homeland Security advisor (2001–2003), governor of Pennsylvania (1995–2001), U.S. representative from Pennsylvania's 21st congressional district (1983–1995) (Republican)

U.S. senators

- Mitt Romney, U.S. senator from Utah (2019–present), former governor of Massachusetts (2003–2007) and nominee for President in 2012 (Republican)
- Pat Toomey, U.S. senator from Pennsylvania (2011–2023) and former U.S. representative from Pennsylvania's 15th congressional district (1999–2005) (Republican)

U.S. representatives

- ~~Charlie Dent, former U.S. representative from Pennsylvania's 15th congressional district (2005–2018) (Republican)~~ (previously declined to endorse, then endorsed Shapiro)
- Phil English, former U.S. representative from Pennsylvania's 3rd congressional district (2003–2009) and Pennsylvania's 21st congressional district (1995–2003) (Republican)
- Brian Fitzpatrick, U.S. representative from Pennsylvania's 1st congressional district (2019–present), former U.S. representative from Pennsylvania's 8th congressional district (2017–2019) (Republican)
- Tom Marino, U.S. representative from Pennsylvania's 12th congressional district (2019) and 10th district (2011–2019) (Republican)

State officials

- Tom Corbett, governor of Pennsylvania (2011–2015), attorney general of Pennsylvania (2005–2011, 1995–1997), U.S. attorney for the Western District of Pennsylvania (1989–1993) (Republican)
- Doug Ducey, governor of Arizona (2015–2023) and chair of the Republican Governors Association (2020–2022) (Republican)
- Larry Hogan, governor of Maryland (2015–2023) (Republican)
- Chris Sununu, governor of New Hampshire (2017–present) (Republican)

State legislators

- Todd Stephens, state representative from the 151st district (2011–2023) (Republican)

Organizations

- Republican Jewish Coalition

Individuals

- Jeff Bartos, 2018 Republican nominee for Lieutenant Governor of Pennsylvania (Republican)
- George Will, libertarian-conservative political commentator and author (Independent, former Republican)

=== Fundraising ===
Campaign finance reports as of December 31, 2022
Candidate	Raised	Spent	Cash on hand
Josh Shapiro (D)	$67,981,264	$54,967,428	$403,274
Doug Mastriano (R)	$7,055,316	$7,081,556	$1,018,238
Source: Commonwealth of Pennsylvania

=== Polling ===
Aggregate polls

Source of poll aggregation	Dates administered	Dates updated	Josh Shapiro (D)	Doug Mastriano (R)	Other (Note: Calculated by taking the difference of 100% and all other candidates combined.)	Margin
Real Clear Politics	October 24–31, 2022	October 31, 2022	52.6%	40.6%	6.8%	Shapiro +12.0%
FiveThirtyEight	June 10 – October 31, 2022	October 28, 2022	51.5%	40.9%	7.6%	Shapiro +10.7%
Average			52.1%	40.8%	7.2%	Shapiro +11.4%

Graphical summary

Poll source	Date(s) administered	Sample size	Margin of error	Josh Shapiro (D)	Doug Mastriano (R)	Other	Undecided
Research Co.	November 4–6, 2022	450 (LV)	± 4.6%	53%	41%	2% (Note: "Some other candidate" with 2%)	4%
Targoz Market Research	November 2–6, 2022	631 (LV)	± 3.8%	52%	46%	3% (Note: Hackenburg (L) with 1%; "All others" with 2%)	–
InsiderAdvantage (R)	November 3, 2022	750 (LV)	± 3.6%	51%	43%	3% (Note: Hackenburg (L) with 2%; "Someone else" with 1%)	4%
The Trafalgar Group (R)	November 1–3, 2022	1,097 (LV)	± 2.9%	50%	45%	2%	3%
Remington Research Group (R)	November 1–2, 2022	1,180 (LV)	± 2.8%	52%	40%	3% (Note: Hackenburg (L) with 2%; DiGiulio (G) with 1%)	4%
Marist College	October 31 – November 2, 2022	1,152 (RV)	± 3.8%	54%	39%	1% (Note: "Another party's candidate" with 1%)	7%
Marist College	October 31 – November 2, 2022	1,021 (LV)	± 4.0%	54%	40%	–	5%
Susquehanna Polling & Research (R)	October 28 – November 1, 2022	700 (LV)	± 3.7%	52%	38%	1% (Note: "Other" with 1%; "Refuse" with <1%)	9%
Emerson College	October 28–31, 2022	1,000 (LV)	± 3.0%	50%	41%	5% (Note: Hackenburg (L) with 2%; DiGiulio (G) with 2%; Soloski (K) with <1%; "Someone else" with 1%)	5%
Emerson College	October 28–31, 2022	1,000 (LV)	± 3.0%	53%	43%	5% (Note: Hackenburg (L) with 2%; DiGiulio (G) with 2%; Soloski (K) with <1%; "Someone else" with 1%)	–
Suffolk University	October 27–30, 2022	500 (LV)	± 4.4%	52%	40%	1% (Note: Hackenburg (L) with 1%; Soloski (K) with 1%; DiGuilio (G) with <1%)	7%
Fox News	October 26–30, 2022	1,005 (RV)	± 3.0%	53%	37%	4% (Note: "Other" with 2%; "Wouldn't vote" with 2%)	6%
Big Data Poll	October 27–28, 2022	1,005 (LV)	± 3.1%	49%	44%	4% (Note: Hackenburg (L) with 2%, Soloski (K) with 1%, Digiulio (G) with 1%)	4%
co/efficient (R)	October 26–28, 2022	1,716 (LV)	± 3.4%	51%	41%	4% (Note: "Someone else" with 4%)	4%
Muhlenberg College	October 24–28, 2022	460 (LV)	± 6.0%	54%	40%	2% (Note: "Neither/Other" with 2%)	4%
Wick Insights (R)	October 26–27, 2022	1,000 (LV)	± 3.2%	49%	43%	2% (Note: "someone else" with 2%)	6%
Siena Research/NYT	October 24–26, 2022	620 (LV)	± 4.4%	53%	40%	<1% (Note: Hackenburg (L) with <1%; Digiulio (G) with <1%; Soloski (K) with <1%)	7%
InsiderAdvantage (R)	October 25, 2022	750 (LV)	± 3.6%	50%	42%	4% (Note: Hackenburg (L) with 3%, "someone else" with 1%)	4%
YouGov/CBS News	October 21–24, 2022	1,084 (LV)	± 4.1%	54%	45%	–	–
Franklin & Marshall College	October 14–23, 2022	620 (RV)	± 5.3%	54%	32%	6% (Note: "Some other candidate" with 3%; Hackenburg (L) with 2%; "Not going to vote" with 1%)	10%
Franklin & Marshall College	October 14–23, 2022	384 (LV)	± 6.8%	58%	36%	–	–
Rasmussen Reports (R)	October 19–20, 2022	972 (LV)	± 3.0%	43%	40%	6% (Note: "Some other candidate" with 6%)	10%
Echelon Insights	October 18–20, 2022	500 (LV)	± 4.8%	50%	38%	3% (Note: DiGuilo (G), Hackenburg (L) and Soloski (K) with 1%)	8%
InsiderAdvantage (R)	October 19, 2022	550 (LV)	± 4.2%	49%	42%	3% (Note: Hackenburg (L) with 2%; "Someone else" with 1%)	6%
CNN/SSRS	October 13–17, 2022	901 (RV)	± 4.1%	56%	39%	5% (Note: "Neither" with 4%; "Other" with 1%)	–
CNN/SSRS	October 13–17, 2022	703 (LV)	± 4.6%	56%	41%	2% (Note: "Neither" with 1%; "Other" with 1%)	–
Wick Insights	October 8–14, 2022	1,013 (LV)	± 3.1%	49%	46%	2% (Note: "Someone else" with 2%)	3%
Patriot Polling	October 10–12, 2022	857 (RV)	–	50%	45%	–	5%
Fabrizio Ward (R)/Impact Research (D)	October 4–12, 2022	1,400 (LV)	± 4.4%	53%	42%	1% (Note: "Other" with 1%)	4%
The Trafalgar Group (R) (Note: This poll was sponsored by The Daily Wire.)	October 8–11, 2022	1,078 (LV)	± 2.9%	53%	44%	1% (Note: Hackenburg (L) with 1%; "Other" with <1%)	2%
Monmouth University	September 29 – October 3, 2022	610 (RV)	± 4.8%	54%	38%	–	8%
Suffolk University	September 27–30, 2022	500 (LV)	± 4.4%	48%	37%	2% (Note: DiGuilo (G) and Hackenburg (L) with 1%; Soloski (K) with <1%)	13%
Emerson College	September 23–26, 2022	1,000 (LV)	± 3.0%	51%	41%	2% (Note: "Someone else" with 2%)	7%
Fox News	September 19–25, 2022	1,008 (RV)	± 3%	51%	40%	–	9%
Franklin & Marshall College	September 19–25, 2022	517 (RV)	± 5.6%	51%	37%	–	12%
InsiderAdvantage (R)	September 23–24, 2022	550 (LV)	± 4.2%	52%	37%	4% (Note: Hackenburg (L) with 3%; "Someone else" with 1%)	7%
Marist College	September 19–22, 2022	1,242 (RV)	± 3.5%	53%	40%	<1% (Note: "Another party's candidate" with <1%)	6%
Marist College	September 19–22, 2022	1,043 (LV)	± 3.8%	54%	42%	–	4%
The Phillips Academy Poll	September 16–19, 2022	759 (RV)	± 3.6%	46%	43%		12%
Muhlenberg College	September 13–16, 2022	420 (LV)	± 6.0%	53%	42%	1% (Note: "Neither/Other" with 1%)	3%
The Trafalgar Group (R)	September 13–15, 2022	1,078 (LV)	± 2.9%	47%	45%	4% (Note: Hackenburg (L) and "Other" with 2%)	3%
Monmouth University	September 8–12, 2022	605 (RV)	± 4.0%	54%	36%	–	–
YouGov/CBS News	September 6–12, 2022	1,188 (LV)	± 3.8%	55%	44%	–	1%
RABA Research	August 31 – September 3, 2022	679 (LV)	± 3.8%	47%	41%	4% (Note: "Someone else" with 4%)	9%
Survey Monkey (D) (Note: This poll was sponsored by Center Street PAC, which opposes Mastriano.)	August 31 – September 1, 2022	1,012 (RV)	± 3.0%	53%	32%	–	15%
Survey Monkey (D)	August 31 – September 1, 2022	616 (LV)	± 3.0%	56%	35%	–	9%
Emerson College	August 22–23, 2022	1,034 (LV)	± 3.0%	47%	44%	3%	6%
Franklin & Marshall College	August 15–21, 2022	522 (RV)	± 5.3%	48%	36%	4% (Note: Hackenburg (L) with 2%; DiGiulio (G) and "Some other candidate" with 1%; Soloski (K) with 0%)	12%
The Trafalgar Group (R)	August 15–18, 2022	1,096 (LV)	± 2.9%	49%	45%	2% (Note: Hackenburg (L) and "Other" with 1%)	5%
Public Opinion Strategies (R)	August 7–10, 2022	600 (RV)	± 4.0%	51%	37%	–	11%
Fox News	July 22–26, 2022	908 (RV)	± 3.0%	50%	40%	1%	8%
Blueprint Polling (D)	July 19–21, 2022	712 (LV)	± 3.7%	51%	39%	–	10%
Beacon Research (D) (Note: This poll was sponsored by the Environmental Voter Project.)	July 5–20, 2022	1,012 (RV)	± 3.1%	49%	35%	1%	12%
Beacon Research (D)	July 5–20, 2022	609 (LV)	± 4.0%	52%	39%	1%	7%
Global Strategy Group (D) (Note: This poll was sponsored by EDF Action and NRDC Action Fund.)	July 14–19, 2022	1,200 (LV)	± 2.9%	50%	42%	–	7%
Fabrizio Ward (R)/Impact Research (D)	June 12–19, 2022	1,382 (LV)	± 4.4%	49%	46%	–	5%
Cygnal (R)	June 16–17, 2022	535 (LV)	± 4.2%	48%	45%	–	7%
Suffolk University	June 10–13, 2022	500 (LV)	± 4.4%	44%	40%	3% (Note: DiGuilo (G) and Hackenburg (L) with 1%; Soloski (K) and "someone else" with <1%)	13%

Hypothetical polling

Generic Democrat vs. generic Republican

Poll source	Date(s) administered	Sample size	Margin of error	Generic Democrat	Generic Republican	Undecided
Public Opinion Strategies (R)	May 12–18, 2022	600 (RV)	± 4.6%	47%	45%	8%

== Results ==
2022 Pennsylvania gubernatorial election
Party	Candidate	Votes	%	±%
Democratic	Josh Shapiro; Austin Davis	3,031,137	56.49%	−1.28%
Republican	Doug Mastriano; Carrie DelRosso	2,238,477	41.71%	+1.01%
Libertarian	Matt Hackenburg; Tim McMaster	51,611	0.96%	−0.02%
Green	Christina DiGiulio; Michael Bagdes-Canning	24,436	0.46%	−0.09%
Keystone	Joe Soloski; Nicole Shultz	20,518	0.38%	N/A
Total votes		5,370,763	100.0%	N/A
Turnout			60.59%	
Registered electors		8,864,831		
Democratic hold				

=== By county ===
County	Josh Shapiro Democratic Party		Doug Mastriano Republican Party		Jonathan Hackenburg Libertarian Party		Christina Digiulio Green Party		Joseph Soloski Keystone Party		Margin		Total votes
#	#	%	#	%	#	%	#	%	#	%	#	%	Total votes
Adams	18,821	40.51%	26,819	57.73%	467	1.01%	160	0.34%	192	0.41%	-7,998	-17.22%	46,459
Allegheny	393,386	68.68%	169,913	29.66%	5,354	0.93%	2,319	0.40%	1,841	0.32%	223,473	39.02%	572,813
Armstrong	9,523	33.46%	18,419	64.73%	265	0.93%	88	0.31%	162	0.57%	-8,896	-31.27%	28,457
Beaver	36,917	50.39%	34,777	47.47%	811	1.11%	386	0.53%	371	0.51%	2,140	2.92%	73,262
Bedford	4,721	21.25%	17,198	77.40%	167	0.75%	56	0.25%	78	0.35%	-12,477	-56.15%	22,220
Berks	78,757	50.87%	72,185	46.63%	1,936	1.25%	1,096	0.71%	844	0.55%	6,572	4.24%	154,818
Blair	17,716	35.20%	31,823	63.22%	412	0.82%	199	0.40%	184	0.37%	-14,107	-28.02%	50,334
Bradford	7,389	31.47%	15,529	66.14%	279	1.19%	164	0.70%	118	0.50%	-8,140	-34.67%	23,479
Bucks	185,339	59.02%	122,982	39.16%	2,935	0.93%	1,694	0.54%	1,091	0.35%	62,357	19.86%	314,041
Butler	40,065	42.87%	51,546	55.15%	1,101	1.18%	367	0.39%	382	0.41%	-11,481	-12.28%	93,461
Cambria	22,885	40.66%	32,381	57.53%	489	0.87%	291	0.52%	235	0.42%	-9,496	-16.87%	56,281
Cameron	639	33.81%	1,200	63.49%	26	1.38%	3	0.16%	22	1.16%	-561	-29.68%	1,890
Carbon	10,743	40.90%	14,943	56.90%	326	1.24%	151	0.57%	101	0.38%	-4,200	-16.00%	26,264
Centre	35,653	57.49%	25,201	40.64%	654	1.05%	209	0.34%	300	0.48%	10,452	16.85%	62,017
Chester	160,796	62.32%	92,585	35.88%	2,713	1.05%	1,093	0.42%	838	0.32%	68,211	26.44%	258,025
Clarion	5,114	33.19%	10,019	65.03%	154	1%	57	0.37%	63	0.41%	-4,905	-31.84%	15,407
Clearfield	10,326	32.87%	20,525	65.34%	316	1.01%	125	0.40%	119	0.38%	-10,199	-32.47%	31,411
Clinton	5,293	37.61%	8,512	60.48%	134	0.95%	59	0.42%	75	0.53%	-3,219	-22.87%	14,073
Columbia	10,148	41.08%	13,959	56.51%	372	1.51%	109	0.44%	115	0.47%	-3,811	-15.43%	24,703
Crawford	12,609	38.41%	19,541	59.52%	338	1.03%	166	0.51%	175	0.53%	-6,932	-21.11%	32,829
Cumberland	61,319	52.86%	52,280	45.07%	1,342	1.16%	513	0.44%	548	0.47%	9,039	7.79%	116,002
Dauphin	68,585	59.95%	43,580	38.10%	1,162	1.02%	604	0.53%	467	0.41%	25,005	21.85%	114,398
Delaware	170,162	67.83%	76,880	30.65%	2,102	0.84%	1,126	0.45%	585	0.23%	93,282	37.18%	250,855
Elk	4,843	35.41%	8,597	62.85%	121	0.88%	61	0.45%	56	0.41%	-3,754	-27.44%	13,678
Erie	63,081	59.74%	40,433	38.29%	1,037	0.98%	569	0.54%	479	0.45%	22,648	21.45%	105,599
Fayette	20,120	42.92%	26,165	55.82%	322	0.69%	137	0.29%	133	0.28%	-6,045	-12.90%	46,877
Forest	825	37.64%	1,340	61.13%	12	0.55%	6	0.27%	9	0.41%	-515	-23.49%	2,192
Franklin	21,612	33.07%	42,731	65.39%	571	0.87%	210	0.32%	226	0.35%	-21,119	-32.32%	65,350
Fulton	1,128	17.94%	5,092	80.99%	39	0.62%	13	0.21%	15	0.24%	-3,964	-63.05%	6,287
Greene	5,142	39.14%	7,706	58.65%	108	0.82%	93	0.71%	90	0.68%	-2,564	-19.51%	13,139
Huntingdon	5,597	30.34%	12,579	68.19%	145	0.79%	60	0.33%	67	0.36%	-6,982	-37.85%	18,448
Indiana	13,032	39.80%	19,179	58.58%	248	0.76%	148	0.45%	135	0.41%	-6,147	-18.78%	32,742
Jefferson	5,038	28.27%	12,433	69.77%	218	1.22%	68	0.38%	63	0.35%	-7,395	-41.5%	17,820
Juniata	2,761	28.27%	6,851	70.14%	94	0.96%	41	0.42%	21	0.21%	-4,090	-41.87%	9,768
Lackawanna	54,442	61.28%	32,697	36.80%	774	0.87%	583	0.66%	347	0.39%	21,745	24.48%	88,843
Lancaster	108,233	48.26%	112,040	49.96%	2,530	1.13%	740	0.33%	725	0.32%	-3,807	-1.70%	224,268
Lawrence	16,023	44.15%	19,611	54.03%	323	0.89%	180	0.50%	157	0.43%	-3,588	-9.88%	36,294
Lebanon	23,646	41.88%	31,731	56.19%	601	1.06%	257	0.46%	231	0.41%	-8,085	-14.31%	56,466
Lehigh	79,991	58.67%	53,468	39.22%	1,591	1.17%	734	0.54%	550	0.40%	26,523	19.45%	136,334
Luzerne	57,598	49.63%	56,326	48.53%	1,100	0.95%	605	0.52%	435	0.37%	1,272	1.10%	116,064
Lycoming	15,643	33.80%	29,755	64.29%	523	1.13%	180	0.39%	184	0.40%	-14,112	-30.49%	46,285
McKean	4,392	29.85%	10,082	68.53%	119	0.81%	55	0.37%	64	0.44%	-5,690	-38.68%	14,712
Mercer	18,282	40.33%	26,273	57.96%	408	0.90%	216	0.48%	152	0.34%	-7,991	-17.63%	45,331
Mifflin	5,119	30.39%	11,460	68.02%	150	0.89%	50	0.30%	68	0.40%	-6,341	-37.63%	16,847
Monroe	32,009	54.41%	25,604	43.52%	650	1.10%	378	0.64%	186	0.32%	6,405	10.89%	58,827
Montgomery	285,712	69.18%	121,289	29.37%	3,463	0.84%	1,384	0.34%	1,168	0.28%	163,883	39.81%	413,016
Montour	3,640	46.33%	4,037	51.38%	106	1.35%	43	0.55%	31	0.39%	-397	-5.05%	7,857
Northampton	72,269	55.63%	54,928	42.28%	1,466	1.13%	711	0.55%	527	0.41%	17,341	13.35%	129,901
Northumberland	12,052	36.58%	19,094	57.95%	466	1.41%	282	0.86%	1,057	3.21%	-7,042	-21.37%	32,951
Perry	6,912	34.15%	12,928	63.87%	234	1.16%	84	0.42%	82	0.41%	-6,016	-29.72%	20,240
Philadelphia	426,885	85.68%	65,293	13.10%	2,492	0.50%	2,372	0.48%	1,218	0.24%	361,592	72.58%	498,260
Pike	10,339	41.14%	14,371	57.18%	210	0.84%	128	0.51%	85	0.34%	-4,032	-16.04%	25,133
Potter	1,513	21.29%	5,235	73.68%	77	1.08%	112	1.58%	168	2.36%	-3,722	-52.39%	7,105
Schuylkill	21,203	38.25%	33,008	59.54%	674	1.22%	288	0.52%	262	0.47%	-11,805	-21.29%	55,435
Snyder	4,867	31.69%	10,215	66.50%	166	1.08%	57	0.37%	55	0.36%	-5,348	-34.81%	15,360
Somerset	9,473	29.08%	22,559	69.25%	274	0.84%	139	0.43%	131	0.40%	-13,086	-40.17%	32,576
Sullivan	1,024	33.87%	1,923	63.61%	33	1.09%	27	0.89%	16	0.53%	-899	-29.74%	3,023
Susquehanna	5,768	33.31%	11,153	64.41%	180	1.04%	110	0.64%	105	0.61%	-5,385	-31.10%	17,316
Tioga	4,494	26.98%	11,840	71.08%	170	1.02%	84	0.50%	70	0.42%	-7,346	-44.10%	16,658
Union	6,898	42.81%	8,897	55.22%	179	1.11%	75	0.47%	64	0.40%	-1,999	-12.41%	16,113
Venango	7,777	37.18%	12,741	60.91%	220	1.05%	81	0.39%	100	0.48%	-4,964	-23.73%	20,919
Warren	6,032	37.55%	9,704	60.40%	164	1.02%	77	0.48%	88	0.55%	-3,672	-22.85%	16,065
Washington	45,030	48.10%	47,052	50.26%	906	0.97%	271	0.29%	358	0.38%	-2,022	-2.16%	93,617
Wayne	8,466	37.22%	13,868	60.98%	211	0.93%	115	0.51%	83	0.36%	-5,402	-23.76%	22,743
Westmoreland	77,152	45.93%	87,804	52.27%	1,613	0.96%	677	0.40%	722	0.43%	-10,652	-6.34%	167,968
Wyoming	4,519	38.37%	6,966	59.15%	140	1.19%	91	0.77%	61	0.52%	-2,447	-20.78%	11,777
York	83,649	44.86%	98,622	52.89%	2,628	1.41%	809	0.43%	768	0.41%	-14,973	-8.03%	186,476
Totals	3,031,137	56.49%	2,238,477	41.71%	51,611	0.96%	24,436	0.46%	20,518	0.38%	792,660	14.78%	5,366,179

==== By congressional district ====
Shapiro won 11 of 17 congressional districts, including two that elected Republicans.

District	Shapiro	Mastriano	Representative
1st	59%	39%	Brian Fitzpatrick
2nd	76%	22%	Brendan Boyle
3rd	92%	6%	Dwight Evans
4th	66%	32%	Madeleine Dean
5th	70%	28%	Mary Gay Scanlon
6th	61%	37%	Chrissy Houlahan
7th	55%	43%	Susan Wild
8th	54%	44%	Matt Cartwright
9th	38%	59%	Dan Meuser
10th	55%	43%	Scott Perry
11th	46%	52%	Lloyd Smucker
12th	68%	30%	Mike Doyle (117th Congress)
12th	68%	30%	Summer Lee (118th Congress)
13th	34%	64%	John Joyce
14th	44%	55%	Guy Reschenthaler
15th	38%	60%	Glenn Thompson
16th	48%	50%	Mike Kelly
17th	62%	36%	Conor Lamb (117th Congress)
17th	62%	36%	Chris Deluzio (118th Congress)

== Analysis ==
Josh Shapiro defeated Doug Mastriano by 14.8%. While this marked a 2.73% Republican swing from 2018, it was still 13.18% larger than Joe Biden's win in the presidential race in Pennsylvania two years earlier in 2020, and 9.86% larger than Shapiro's reelection for Attorney General that same year. All counties in the Keystone State voted the exact same way they did in 2018, with Shapiro doing best in heavily populated Southeastern Pennsylvania, which is made up of Philadelphia and its suburbs, Berks County (Reading), the Lehigh Valley (Allentown, Bethlehem, and Easton), the Wyoming Valley (Scranton, Wilkes-Barre, and Hazleton), the Susquehanna Valley (Harrisburg and Carlisle), Erie County in the northwest corner, and finally, Greater Pittsburgh in the southwest.

Doug Mastriano, meanwhile, piled up large margins in Pennsylvania's rural counties, but also won some populous places located in the western part of the state, like Butler, Washington, and Westmoreland counties near Pittsburgh. However, Mastriano significantly underperformed President Donald Trump's margins in the 2020 Presidential election in some of those counties; Westmoreland County, for example, voted for Trump by 28 points in 2020, but only backed Mastriano by 6 points in 2022. A similar leftward shift happened in neighboring Washington County, with Shapiro only losing the county by 2 points despite Joe Biden losing the county by over 20 points 2 years earlier. Mastriano also carried Lancaster, including the counties contained either fully or partially within his State Senate district, namely Adams, Franklin and York. Except for Adams and Franklin counties, Lancaster and York were once again carried by single digits by the Republican gubernatorial candidate just like 2018, as Mastriano's extremist views likely turned off moderate independents and Republicans in these areas.

Southeastern Pennsylvania, a strong Democratic area during elections, shifted more Democratic. This region, with strongly Democratic Philadelphia, anchored by its suburbs, has become a Democratic stronghold in elections. Shapiro comfortably won all Delaware Valley counties and piled up large margins in its suburbs. Its electorate is highly educated, affluent, and diverse. In addition to the region's strong Democratic tilt, abortion rights were a significant campaign issue among voters. According to CNN polling data, 62% of Pennsylvania voters believed abortion should be legal, and those voters broke for Shapiro by a landslide margin of 81%–18%. College-educated voters, who made up 41% of the electorate, also voted heavily for Shapiro by a 64%–35% margin. Shapiro won 92% of Black voters, 72% of Latino voters, and 50% of White voters. According to Ron Brownstein of CNN in 2023, Shapiro won independent voters by double-digit margins, which contributed to Mastriano's defeat.

=== Voter demographics ===
Voter demographic data for 2022 was collected by CNN. The voter survey is based on exit polls completed by 2,657 voters in person as well as by phone.

2022 Pennsylvania gubernatorial election voter demographics (CNN)
Demographic subgroup	Shapiro	Mastriano	% of total vote
Ideology
Liberals	94	4	25
Moderates	71	28	41
Conservatives	13	86	34
Party
Democrats	96	3	37
Republicans	16	83	40
Independents	64	33	24
Gender
Men	48	50	49
Women	63	37	51
Marital status
Married	52	47	64
Unmarried	65	33	36
Gender by marital status
Married men	49	50	36
Married women	55	44	29
Unmarried men	53	43	14
Unmarried women	73	27	21
Race/ethnicity
White	50	48	81
Black	92	8	8
Latino	72	25	8
White voters by gender
White men	43	55	41
White women	58	42	41
Age
18–24 years old	72	25	7
25–29 years old	69	31	5
30–39 years old	64	34	13
40–49 years old	55	44	11
50–64 years old	51	49	29
65 and older	51	47	34
2020 presidential vote
Biden	96	3	48
Trump	15	84	45
First time midterm election voter
Yes	66	30	12
No	54	45	88
Education
Never attended college	41	59	24
Some college education	59	38	21
Associate degree	54	44	14
Bachelor's degree	58	41	23
Advanced degree	72	27	18
Education by race
White college graduates	62	37	35
White no college degree	43	56	47
Non-white college graduates	76	23	6
Non-white no college degree	82	17	12
Education by gender/race
White women with college degrees	69	30	17
White women without college degrees	50	49	24
White men with college degrees	55	44	18
White men without college degrees	35	63	23
Non-white	80	19	19
Issue regarded as most important
Crime	55	42	11
Abortion	80	19	37
Inflation	33	66	28
Feelings about Roe v. Wade being overturned
Enthusiastic/satisfied	14	84	38
Dissatisfied/angry	84	15	59
Abortion should be
Legal	81	18	62
Illegal	16	83	34

== See also ==
- 2022 Pennsylvania elections

== Notes ==
Partisan clients
