= Libertarian Party of Pennsylvania =

State affiliate of the Libertarian Party

- Abbreviation: LPPA
- Chairperson: Greg Deal
- Founded: 1971
- Headquarters: 3915 Union Deposit Road; P.O. Box 223; Harrisburg, PA 17109
- Membership (2021): ▲45,469
- Ideology: Libertarianism
- National affiliation: Libertarian Party
- Colors: Gold-yellow
- Statewide executive offices: 0 / 5
- Justices of the PA Supreme Court: 0 / 7
- Seats in the PA Senate: 0 / 50
- Seats in the PA House: 0 / 203
- PA seats in the U.S. Senate: 0 / 2
- PA seats in the U.S. House: 0 / 18
- Other elected officials: 108 (June 2024)

Website
- lppa.org

The Libertarian Party of Pennsylvania (LPPA) is the Pennsylvania affiliate of the Libertarian Party. Since March 2023, it has been chaired by Greg Deal.

== Leadership ==
Executive Committee
Chair	Vice Chair	Secretary	Treasurer
Gregory Deal	Bryan Goodnight	Alfa Shaw	Greg Perry

== LPPA Platform ==
The party believes that each individual must be free to do as she or he pleases as long as she or he does not infringe upon the equal right of others. Another tenet is that force must not be used on an individual, unless that individual has initiated the use of force or fraud. The party also believes that only those laws that are consistent with the purpose of the government to protect and secure individuals' rights should be utilized by the government.

== History ==
=== Takeover by Mises Caucus ===
The Mises Caucus, a Paleolibertarian group with ties to the Ron Paul 2012 presidential campaign who described the Caucus as "the libertarian wing of the Libertarian Party," staged a takeover of the national Libertarian party at the 2022 Libertarian National Convention on May 28. Concurrently, state branches staged takeovers of state affiliates and took control of 37 of the state parties. As a result, the parties of New Mexico, Virginia, and Massachusetts disaffiliated from the National Libertarian Party, and in late 2022 formed the Association of Liberty State Parties. In Pennsylvania, Rob Cowburn led the local Mises branch in taking over the party, however, older members of the state committee, and various county branch leaders, left the party in protest and formed the Keystone Party of Pennsylvania led by Gus Tatlas, the former leader of the York County branch of the party.

On December 28, 2023, former LPPA Executive Director Kevin Gaughen issued a press release titled "The LP of Pennsylvania Has Collapsed!" Gaughen denounced the Mises Caucus as the cause of the drop in the number of due-paying members from ~1,600 to 597 resulting in a 45.9% decline in total party income and that the party now has only $17,953 in its treasury, though it started with $47,377.92 during the takeover. He also pointed out that all Mises endorsed libertarians in the 2022 election lost, and that the only libertarians that were elected in Pennsylvania in 2022 were non-Mises old-guard. He also noted that before the takeover the party had 39 active county and regional committees covering 48 counties, which dropped to 20 active committees covering 22 counties post-takeover.

== Elected officeholders ==
The Libertarian Party of Pennsylvania has had many candidates elected to city and county positions throughout Pennsylvania, though the party does not hold any of the state's federal positions or seats in the state legislature. There are currently 108 elected Libertarian officeholders in Pennsylvania as of June 2024.

== Electoral performance ==
=== Federal elections ===
==== U.S. President ====
Election year	Vote percentage	±%	Votes	Presidential candidate	Vice presidential candidate	Result	Reference
1980	0.7%	N/A	33,263	Ed Clark	David Koch	4th	
1984	0.1%	▼0.59	6,982	David Bergland	James A. Lewis	4th	
1988	0.3%	▲0.1	12,051	Ron Paul	Andre Marrou	4th	
1992	0.4%	▲0.2	21,477	Andre Marrou	Nancy Lord	4th	
1996	0.6%	▲0.2	28,000	Harry Browne	Jo Jorgensen	4th	
2000	0.2%	▼0.4	11,248	Harry Browne	Art Olivier	6th	
2004	0.4%	▲0.1	21,185	Michael Badnarik	Richard Campagna	3rd	
2008	0.3%	▼ nil	19,912	Bob Barr	Wayne Allyn Root	4th	
2012	0.9%	▲0.5	49,991	Gary Johnson	Jim Gray	3rd	
2016	2.4%	▲1.5	146,715	Gary Johnson	Bill Weld	3rd	
2020	1.2%	▼1.2	79,380	Jo Jorgensen	Spike Cohen	3rd	

==== U.S. Senate ====
Year	Candidate	Votes	Percentage
1980	David K. Walter	18,595	0.4%
1982	Barbara I. Karkutt	19,244	0.5%
1988	Henry E. Haller II	11,822	0.3%
1992	John Perry	219,319	4.6%
1994	Donald Ernsberger	59,115	1.7%
1998	Jack Iannantuono	46,103	1.6%
2000	John Featherman	45,775	1.0%
2004	Betsy Summers	79,263	1.4%
2012	Rayburn Smith	96,926	1.7%
2016	Edward T. Clifford III	235,142	3.9%
2018	Dale Kerns	50,153	1.0%
2022	Erik Gerhardt	72,887	1.4%
