= 2016 United States presidential election in New Mexico =

- November 8, 2016
- Turnout: 62.36% (of eligible voters)

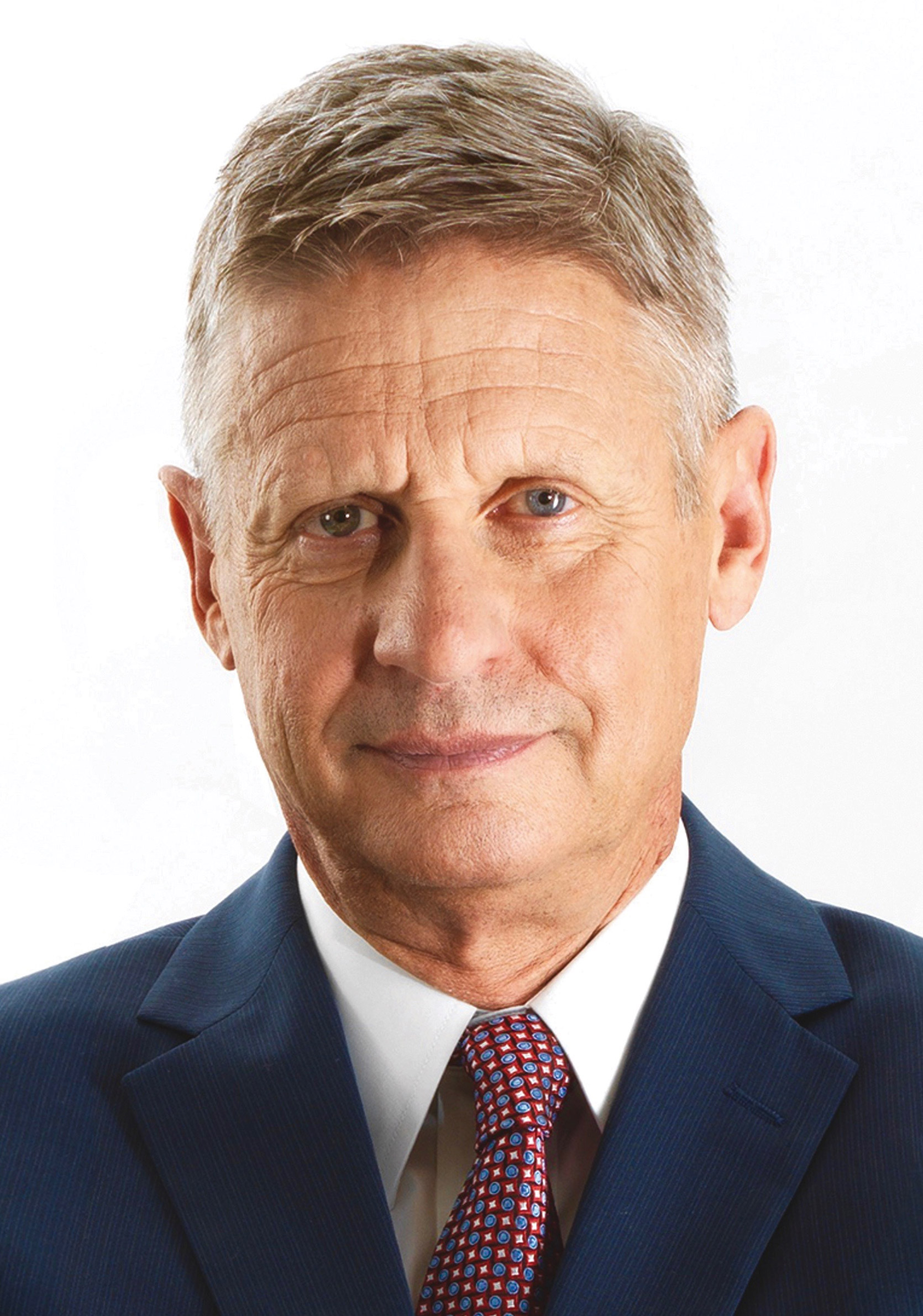
Nominee	Hillary Clinton	Donald Trump	Gary Johnson
Party	Democratic	Republican	Libertarian
Home state	New York	New York	New Mexico
Running mate	Tim Kaine	Mike Pence	Bill Weld
Electoral vote	5	0	0
Popular vote	385,234	319,667	74,541
Percentage	48.26%	40.04%	9.34%

Clinton
40–50%
50–60%
60–70%
70–80%
80–90%
90–100%
Trump
40–50%
50–60%
60–70%
70–80%
80–90%
90–100%
No data
President before election
Barack Obama
Democratic
Elected President
Donald Trump
Republican

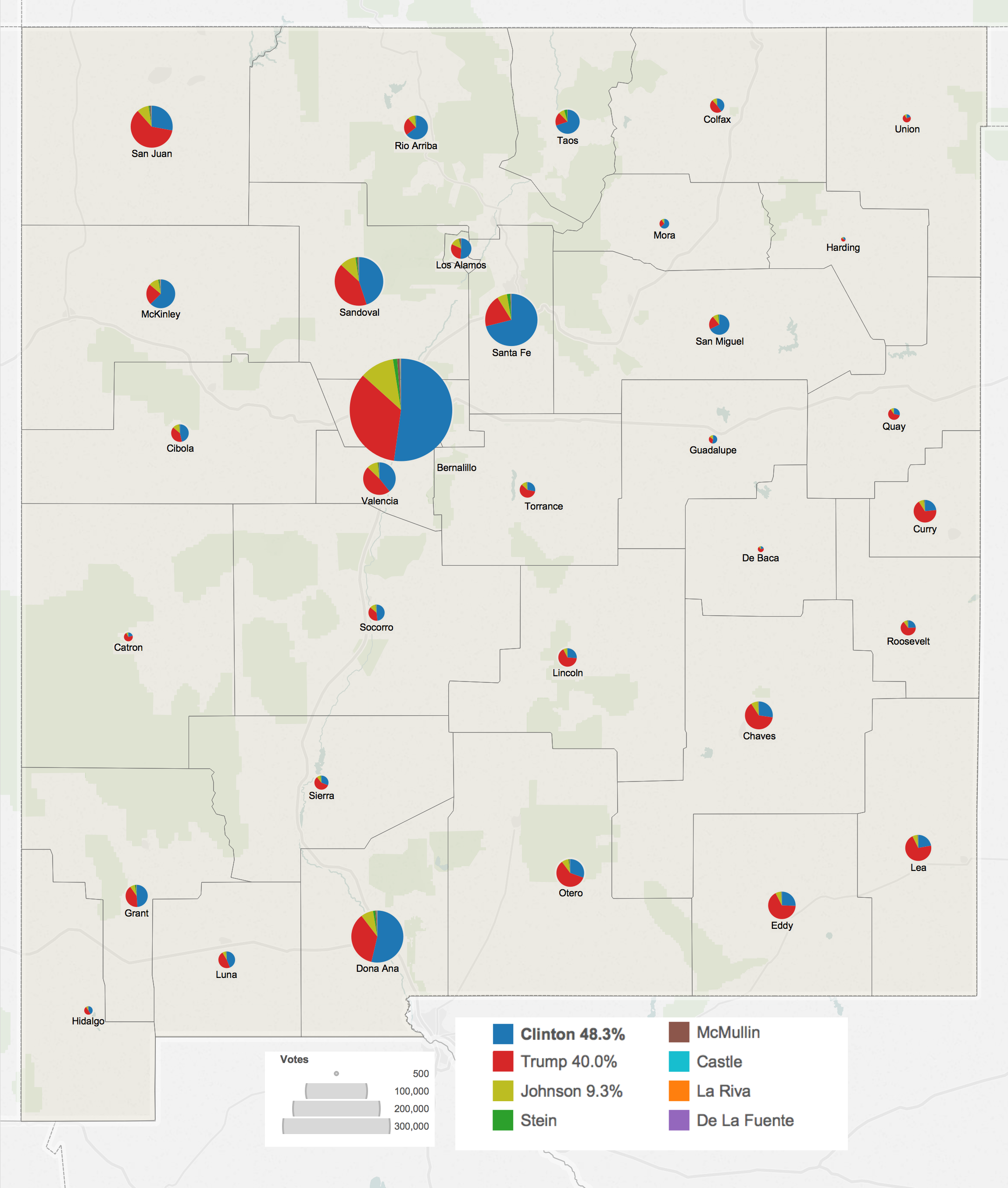
Results by county showing number of votes by size and candidates by color

Treemap of the popular vote by county

The 2016 United States presidential election in New Mexico was held on Tuesday, November 8, 2016, as part of the 2016 United States presidential election in which all 50 states plus the District of Columbia participated. New Mexico voters chose electors to represent them in the Electoral College via a popular vote, pitting the Republican Party's nominee, businessman Donald Trump, and running mate Indiana Governor Mike Pence against Democratic Party nominee, former Secretary of State Hillary Clinton, and her running mate Virginia Senator Tim Kaine. New Mexico has five electoral votes in the Electoral College.

Clinton won the state of New Mexico with a plurality, by a margin of 8.2 percentage points. The state had long been considered leaning Democratic, or a state Clinton would win, due to its large population of Hispanic/Latino and Native American voters. Former New Mexico Governor Gary Johnson achieved 9% in his home state, his best performance of any state, and the Libertarian Party's best performance in any single state since Ed Clark received 11.66% of the vote in Alaska in 1980. Johnson's result was also the best result for a third party or independent candidate in New Mexico since Ross Perot's campaign in 1992.

This is the third time since 1912, when New Mexico attained statehood, that the state voted for a candidate who did not win the Electoral College, the other instances being 1976 and 2000. However, in this election and in 2000, the state did vote for the winner of the popular vote. This also marked the second of only three times since its statehood in 1912 that a non-incumbent Republican won the White House without carrying New Mexico (along with 2000 and 2024). Trump became the first Republican to win the White House without carrying Los Alamos County since Dwight D. Eisenhower in 1952, as well as the first to do so without carrying Sandoval County since Richard Nixon in 1968.

== Primary elections ==
=== Democratic primary ===
Four candidates appeared on the Democratic Party (United States) presidential primary ballot:

- Bernie Sanders
- Hillary Clinton
- Rocky De La Fuente
- Martin O'Malley (withdrawn)

New Mexico Democratic primary, June 7, 2016
Candidate	Popular vote		Estimated delegates		
Candidate	Count	Percentage	Pledged	Unpledged	Total
Hillary Clinton	111,334	51.53%	18	9	27
Bernie Sanders	104,741	48.47%	16	0	16
Uncommitted	—N/a		0	0	0
Total	216,075	100%	34	9	43

=== Republican primary ===
Republican primary results by county: Donald Trump: 50–60%; 60–70%; 70–80%; 80–90%

Twelve candidates appeared on the Republican presidential primary ballot:

- Jeb Bush (withdrawn)
- Ben Carson (withdrawn)
- Chris Christie (withdrawn)
- Ted Cruz (withdrawn)
- Carly Fiorina (withdrawn)
- Jim Gilmore (withdrawn)
- Mike Huckabee (withdrawn)
- John Kasich (withdrawn)
- Rand Paul (withdrawn)
- Marco Rubio (withdrawn)
- Rick Santorum (withdrawn)
- Donald Trump

Donald Trump, the only candidate with an active campaign, won every delegate from New Mexico.

New Mexico Republican primary, June 7, 2016
Candidate	Votes	Percentage	Actual delegate count		
Candidate	Votes	Percentage	Bound	Unbound	Total
Donald Trump	73,908	70.64%	24	0	24
Ted Cruz (withdrawn)	13,925	13.31%	0	0	0
John Kasich (withdrawn)	7,925	7.57%	0	0	0
Ben Carson (withdrawn)	3,830	3.66%	0	0	0
Jeb Bush (withdrawn)	3,531	3.37%	0	0	0
Carly Fiorina (withdrawn)	1,508	1.44%	0	0	0
Unprojected delegates:			0	0	0
Total:	104,627	100.00%	24	0	24
Source: The Green Papers

== General election ==
=== Polling ===
Albuquerque Journal October 2, 2016

- Clinton 35%
- Trump 31%
- Johnson 24%
- Stein 2%

Albuquerque Journal November 5, 2016

- Clinton 45%
- Trump 40%
- Johnson 11%
- Stein 3%

Clinton won every pre-election poll conducted. Her margin of victory varied from 2 points to 13 points. The last poll showed Clinton ahead of Trump 46% to 44%, while the RealClearPolitics average of the last three had Clinton leading Trump 45.3% to 40.3% on the day of the election, with Gary Johnson at 9.3% and Green Party candidate Jill Stein at 2.3%. Johnson's highest level of support was 25% in a Washington Post-SurveyMonkey poll in early September.

=== Predictions ===
Source	Ranking	As of
Los Angeles Times	Safe D	November 6, 2016
CNN	Safe D	November 4, 2016
Cook Political Report	Likely D	November 7, 2016
Electoral-vote.com	Lean D	November 8, 2016
Rothenberg Political Report	Safe D	November 7, 2016
Sabato's Crystal Ball	Likely D	November 7, 2016
RealClearPolitics	Tossup	November 8, 2016
Fox News	Lean D	November 7, 2016

=== Results ===
2016 United States presidential election in New Mexico
Party	Candidate	Votes	%	±%
Democratic	Hillary Clinton; Tim Kaine	385,234	48.26%	−4.73
Republican	Donald Trump; Mike Pence	319,667	40.04%	−2.80
Libertarian	Gary Johnson; Bill Weld	74,541	9.34%	+5.79
Green	Jill Stein; Ajamu Baraka	9,879	1.24%	+0.90
Better for America	Evan McMullin; Nathan Johnson	5,825	0.73%	N/A
Constitution	Darrell Castle; Scott Bradley	1,514	0.19%	+0.06
Socialism and Liberation	Gloria La Riva; Dennis Banks	1,184	0.15%	N/A
American Delta	Rocky De La Fuente; Michael Steinberg	475	0.06%	N/A
Total votes		798,319	100.00%	
Democratic win				

==== By county ====
County	Hillary Clinton Democratic		Donald Trump Republican		Gary Johnson Libertarian		Various candidates Other parties		Margin		Total votes cast
County	#	%	#	%	#	%	#	%	#	%	Total votes cast
Bernalillo	143,417	52.22%	94,698	34.48%	29,682	10.81%	6,865	2.50%	48,719	17.74%	274,662
Catron	427	20.84%	1,464	71.45%	111	5.42%	47	2.29%	-1,037	-50.61%	2,049
Chaves	5,534	27.30%	12,872	63.50%	1,609	7.94%	256	1.26%	-7,338	-36.20%	20,271
Cibola	3,741	46.40%	3,195	39.63%	970	12.03%	157	1.95%	546	6.77%	8,063
Colfax	2,129	39.93%	2,585	48.48%	527	9.88%	91	1.71%	-456	-8.55%	5,332
Curry	3,121	23.34%	9,035	67.58%	973	7.28%	241	1.80%	-5,914	-44.24%	13,370
De Baca	193	21.21%	620	68.13%	89	9.78%	8	0.88%	-427	-46.92%	910
Doña Ana	37,947	53.71%	25,374	35.92%	5,471	7.74%	1,856	2.63%	12,573	17.79%	70,648
Eddy	5,033	25.59%	13,147	66.85%	1,275	6.48%	212	1.08%	-8,114	-41.26%	19,667
Grant	6,276	48.99%	5,288	41.28%	899	7.02%	348	2.72%	988	7.71%	12,811
Guadalupe	970	53.09%	595	32.57%	238	13.03%	24	1.31%	375	20.52%	1,827
Harding	156	29.60%	311	59.01%	55	10.44%	5	0.95%	-155	-29.41%	527
Hidalgo	784	41.88%	910	48.61%	137	7.32%	41	2.19%	-126	-6.73%	1,872
Lea	3,930	22.19%	12,495	70.55%	1,098	6.20%	189	1.07%	-8,565	-48.36%	17,712
Lincoln	2,331	26.19%	5,896	66.23%	560	6.29%	115	1.29%	-3,565	-40.04%	8,902
Los Alamos	5,562	51.10%	3,359	30.86%	1,512	13.89%	452	4.15%	2,203	20.24%	10,885
Luna	3,195	43.80%	3,478	47.68%	481	6.59%	141	1.93%	-283	-3.88%	7,295
McKinley	13,576	62.55%	5,104	23.52%	2,412	11.11%	611	2.82%	8,472	39.03%	21,703
Mora	1,536	62.93%	665	27.24%	194	7.95%	46	1.88%	871	35.69%	2,441
Otero	6,124	30.53%	11,887	59.26%	1,613	8.04%	436	2.17%	-5,763	-28.73%	20,060
Quay	1,017	28.47%	2,212	61.93%	299	8.37%	44	1.23%	-1,195	-33.46%	3,572
Rio Arriba	9,592	64.47%	3,599	24.19%	1,425	9.58%	262	1.76%	5,993	40.28%	14,878
Roosevelt	1,454	24.44%	3,884	65.28%	482	8.10%	130	2.18%	-2,430	-40.84%	5,950
San Juan	12,865	27.90%	27,946	60.61%	4,200	9.11%	1099	2.38%	-15,081	-32.71%	46,110
San Miguel	7,285	67.76%	2,313	21.51%	915	8.61%	238	2.21%	4,972	46.25%	10,751
Sandoval	27,707	44.91%	25,905	41.99%	6,657	10.79%	1,421	2.30%	1,802	2.92%	61,690
Santa Fe	50,793	71.10%	14,332	20.06%	4,362	6.11%	1,947	2.73%	36,461	51.04%	71,434
Sierra	1,612	31.11%	3,010	58.10%	442	8.53%	117	2.26%	-1,398	-26.99%	5,181
Socorro	3,313	48.24%	2,616	38.09%	802	11.68%	137	1.99%	697	10.15%	6,868
Taos	10,668	69.91%	2,727	17.87%	1,179	7.73%	686	4.50%	7,941	52.04%	15,260
Torrance	1,785	28.23%	3,714	58.73%	692	10.94%	133	2.10%	-1,929	-30.50%	6,324
Union	320	18.80%	1,216	71.45%	134	7.87%	32	1.88%	-896	-52.65%	1,702
Valencia	10,841	39.29%	13,215	47.89%	3,046	11.04%	490	1.78%	-2,374	-8.60%	27,592
Total	385,234	48.26%	319,667	40.04%	74,541	9.34%	18,877	2.36%	65,567	8.22%	798,319

Counties that flipped from Democratic to Republican

- Colfax (largest city: Raton)
- Hidalgo (largest city: Lordsburg)
- Valencia (largest village: Los Lunas)

==== By congressional district ====
Clinton won two of three congressional districts.

District	Trump	Clinton	Representative
1st	35%	52%	Michelle Lujan Grisham
2nd	50%	40%	Steve Pearce
3rd	37%	52%	Ben Ray Luján

== See also ==
- 2016 Democratic Party presidential debates and forums
- 2016 Democratic Party presidential primaries
- 2016 Republican Party presidential debates and forums
- 2016 Republican Party presidential primaries
