= Liberal Party USA =

Political party in the United States

- Chairperson: Trisha Butler
- Founded: December 3, 2022; 3 years ago (as Association of Liberty State Parties); February 12, 2024; 2 years ago (as Liberal Party USA)
- Split from: Libertarian Party
- Registered voters (2024): 31,343
- Ideology: Classical liberalism; Liberal conservatism
- Political position: Center

Website
- www.liberalpartyusa.org

The Liberal Party USA (formerly known as Association of Liberty State Parties) is a classical liberal political party in the United States that is affiliated with multiple state parties.

In 2022, the state libertarian parties from Massachusetts and New Mexico disaffiliated from the national Libertarian Party and affiliated with one another. The Libertarian Party of Virginia also split, with some members leaving to form a new party, the Virginia Classical Liberal Party, that affiliated with Liberal Party USA. Additionally, the Liberal Party of Pennsylvania is associated with the organization.

For the 2024 United States presidential election, Liberal Party USA nominated Laura Ebke and party chairwoman Trisha Butler as the party's first presidential and vice presidential nominees.

== History ==
=== Association of Liberty State Parties (2022-2024) ===
At the 2022 Libertarian National Convention members of the Mises Caucus, a paleolibertarian group, staged a takeover of the Libertarian Party and shifted the party in a rightward direction. The caucus got their members elected to sweep leadership positions, including Angela McArdle as chair and Joshua Smith as vice-chair. After the takeover, many non-Mises-affiliated members walked out, criticizing the group for rejecting libertarian orthodoxy and for several allegedly racist statements Caucus members had made in the past. More ardent members of the party started to splinter, with Pennsylvania, the state with the most elected Libertarian officeholders, seeing a hardliner Mises-affiliated member, Rob Cowburn, being named chairman, resulting in dissidents splitting to form the Keystone Party of Pennsylvania.

After the Mises-dominated Libertarian Party adopted the national divorce as part of the party's official core rallying cries, several moderate members of the party began to mutiny, with the state Libertarian affiliates in New Mexico and Virginia disaffiliating from the national party, and in the case of Virginia, dissolving itself. The party in New Mexico also highlighted that according to LP bylaws, that there can never be more than two executive positions overturned in a single convention, making the Mises sweep illegal. The Mises-dominated party changed the bylaws after their sweep to amend this. After Mises-affiliated libertarians in Virginia reformed their branch of the party quickly seeing backing from the national party, the dissidents then formed a splinter group, the Virginia Classical Liberal Party. Additionally, after the Libertarian Association of Massachusetts disaffiliated, Mises hardliners formed the Libertarian Party of Massachusetts, which the national party recognized as the official libertarian branch in the state. Mises was also able to block the disaffiliation of the New Hampshire party.

The Association of Liberty State Parties (ALSP) was officially formed on December 3, 2022, as a national party committee between the Massachusetts and New Mexico parties, and the Virginian splinters. The party's first goal was to organize a national convention for the nomination of candidates for President and Vice President of the United States, and to expand into more states.

=== Liberal Party USA (2024 - Present) ===
After briefly flirting with creating its own national political party, the Keystone Party of Pennsylvania began merger talks with ALSP in mid-2023. A preliminary platform and values statement was drafted by Chris Luchini (ALSP chairman), Kevin Gaughen (Keystone chairman), Brian Doss, Joshua Eakle, Jonathan Casey, and Tyler Harris over the course of several months.

Keystone and ALSP had a merger meeting at the Cambria Hotel in Nashville, Tennessee from December 8–10, 2023. Members from all ALSP state parties were in attendance, as well as representatives from Keystone, and also representatives from prospective new state parties that had not yet been formed. At that meeting, the platform and values were workshopped further, a strategy was formulated to create a new nationwide political party, and Joshua Eakle first suggested the name "Liberal Party" for the new organization.

During a subsequent Zoom meeting on January 12, 2024, the new organization officially adopted the name "Liberal Party" and named Trisha Butler to serve as the Liberal Party's pro-tem chairwoman until the inaugural convention. This was announced on February 12, 2024.

As part of their new affiliation to the Liberal Party USA, the Keystone Party announced that it would be changing its name to the Liberal Party of Pennsylvania.

On May 30, 2024, the Liberal Party officially adopted its platform and values statement. Party co-founder, and former leader of the Keystone Party, Kevin Gaughen, announced on Twitter the adoption of the party's official bylaws as well as the addition of three state affiliates in Missouri, Utah, and Wyoming.

The party announced the creation of a Nebraska affiliate on its social media on July 26, 2024. Later on September 13, 2024, the party announced its recognition of the Oklahoma Freedom Party as its affiliate in Oklahoma.

==== 2024 United States presidential ticket ====
The party previously announced that it would not have a candidate for the 2024 United States presidential election with the Massachusetts party reporting it would run Libertarian candidates Chase-Ter Maat on their ballot line. However, in September 2024, Liberal Party USA formed its first presidential ticket, with ballot access in New Mexico as well as automatic write-in status in nine other states, consisting of former Nebraska Republican Party politician and pro-life conservative libertarian Laura Ebke for president, with their party chairwoman and classical liberal Trisha Butler nominated for vice president. Ebke and Butler received only 859 individual votes for 0.00% of the electorate.

==== First national convention ====
The inaugural Liberal Party National Convention was held on December 6–8, 2024, in Houston, Texas. Two new state affiliates, the New Hampshire Classic Liberal Party and the Montana Liberal Party, became affiliated with the party, and the party is currently working on creating 10 new state affiliates. Interim chair Trisha Butler was elected as the first permanent chair.

==== Opposition towards the Trump Administration ====
The party has presented a clear opposition to the policies and governing approach associated with the Second administration of Donald Trump, particularly in areas concerning immigration enforcement. Chair Trisha Butler stated on social media “The federal government is killing Americans in our streets.” in response to the Death of Alex Pretti.

== Platform ==
Liberal Party USA supports election reform, particularly ballot access reform and removing first-past-the-post voting, while rejecting any law which would restrict voting. It also supports representation reform, particularly proportional representation.

The party also supports reducing the federal government's size and power. In the economic area, the party favors “simpler and less invasive methods of taxation” which would only raise the amount of money needed for a functioning government, along with a balanced budget. The party's platform also argues for anti-corruption laws, the repeal of qualified immunity laws, and more transparency in government.

Liberal Party USA believes that, while the environment must be protected, protection “must be balanced with individual and economic freedoms.” It favors class-action lawsuits against polluters. It also supports healthcare reform and “free migration, free trade, and expanded federalism”, while opposing nationalism.

Liberal Party USA is strongly supportive of individual rights, including the rights to self-defense and to bear arms and freedom of speech and religion. It also supports bodily autonomy and education as parents see fit without government interference, along with a right to privacy. Liberal Party USA is strongly supportive of LGBTQ+ rights. It also supports ending civil asset forfeiture and decriminalizing victimless crimes, including sex work and gambling. The party also supports jury nullification and ending the war on drugs .

In the economic area, the party strongly supports capitalism, with its platform “[rejecting] any unnecessary impositions on the right of individuals or businesses to trade freely and/or to maintain the livelihoods of their choosing.” It strongly supports private property and a decrease in government regulation of the economy, although it believes that addressing harms that arise from social or commercial activity is a legitimate government function. The party opposes land-use regulations.

Regarding foreign policy, Liberal Party USA mainly follows the non-aggression principle (it believes that war should only be declared in the event that the United States or any ally is attacked), and believes that only Congress has the power to declare war. It encourages participation in treaties as long as they are of mutual benefit to the United States and to the other parties involved and supports free trade with as little restriction as possible between nations.

== Symbols ==
The party is represented by a Bison, it was chosen as the party's mascot because of its association with freedom, life, service, abundance, and unity. It is also rooted in the American Identity embodying strength, respect and resilience.

== List of affiliates ==
State/territorial party	Chairperson	Members	Upper house seats	Lower house seats	Ballot access	Presidential ballot access (2024)
Liberty Alliance of Massachusetts	Peter Everett		0 / 34	0 / 163	Yes	No
Missouri Liberal Party			0 / 34	0 / 163	No	No
Montana Liberal Party	Sid Daoud		0 / 50	0 / 100	No	No
Nebraska Liberal Party	Schuyler Windham		0 / 49		No	No
New Hampshire Classic Liberal Party	Daryl D’Angelo		0 / 24	0 / 400	No	No
Libertarian Party of New Mexico	Chris Luchini	15,211 (2024)	0 / 34	0 / 163	Yes	Yes
Oklahoma Freedom Party			0 / 48	0 / 101	No	No
Oregon Liberal Party			0 / 30	0 / 60	No	No
Liberal Party of Pennsylvania	Jennifer Moore		0 / 34	0 / 163	No	No
Liberal Party Utah			0 / 29	0 / 75	No	No
Classical Liberal Party of Virginia			0 / 34	0 / 163	No	No
Wyoming Liberal Party			0 / 30	0 / 60	No	No

== See also ==
- Forward Party
- Liberalism in the United States
- Third parties in the United States
- Approval voting and ranked-choice voting
- Free markets
