= 2022 Pennsylvania elections =

- November 8, 2022

Elections were held in Pennsylvania on November 8, 2022. On that date, the state held elections for Governor and Lieutenant Governor (on one ticket), U.S. Senate, U.S. House of Representatives, Pennsylvania State Senate, Pennsylvania House of Representatives, and various other government leadership positions.

== Redistricting ==
As a result of the 2020 Census, Pennsylvania's congressional, State Senate, and State House districts would all be redrawn. Summary 2020 census data released by the United States Census Bureau in April 2021 announced that Pennsylvania would lose one congressional seat.

== United States Senate ==
Incumbent Republican senator Pat Toomey announced he would retire at the end of his term and not seek re-election in 2022. Democratic lieutenant governor John Fetterman defeated Republican nominee celebrity doctor Mehmet Oz in the general election, making it the only Senate seat to change party control in 2022.

2022 United States Senate election in Pennsylvania
Party	Candidate	Votes	%	±%
Democratic	John Fetterman	2,751,012	51.25%	+3.91%
Republican	Mehmet Oz	2,487,260	46.33%	−2.44%
Libertarian	Erik Gerhardt	72,887	1.36%	−2.53%
Green	Richard L. Weiss	30,434	0.57%	N/A
Keystone	Dan Wassmer	26,428	0.49%	N/A
Total votes		5,368,021	100.0%	N/A
Democratic gain from Republican				

== United States House of Representatives ==
The general election was held on November 8. Following the 2020 Census, reapportionment led to Pennsylvania's House delegation shrinking from 18 seats to 17 seats; redistricting determined the new district lines.

== Governor and lieutenant governor ==
Incumbent Democratic governor Tom Wolf was term-limited and was not allowed by law to seek re-election for a third term. Lieutenant Governor John Fetterman was eligible for re-election to a second term, but instead chose to run for the United States Senate to replace retiring Sen. Pat Toomey.

The Democratic ticket of state attorney general Josh Shapiro and State Representative Austin Davis defeated the Republican ticket of State Senator Doug Mastriano and State Representative Carrie DelRosso.

2022 Pennsylvania gubernatorial election
Party	Candidate	Votes	%	±%
Democratic	Josh Shapiro; Austin Davis	3,031,137	56.49%	−1.28%
Republican	Doug Mastriano; Carrie DelRosso	2,238,477	41.71%	+1.01%
Libertarian	Matt Hackenburg; Tim McMaster	51,611	0.96%	−0.02%
Green	Christina DiGiulio; Michael Bagdes-Canning	24,436	0.46%	−0.09%
Keystone	Joe Soloski; Nicole Shultz	20,518	0.38%	N/A
Total votes		5,366,179	100.0%	N/A
Registered electors		8,864,831		
Democratic hold				

== State Senate ==
25 of 50 seats (even-numbered districts) in the Pennsylvania Senate were up for election in Pennsylvania's general election.

Party	Leader	Before	After	Change
Republican	Jake Corman (retired)	28	28	Steady
Democratic	Jay Costa	21	22	▲1
Independent	John Yudichak (retired)	1	0	▼1
Total		50	50	

== House of Representatives ==
All 203 seats in the Pennsylvania House of Representatives were up for election in the general election. Democrats won a majority of seats for the first time since 2008.

Party	Leader	Before	After	Change
Democratic	Joanna McClinton	90	102	▲12
Republican	Bryan Cutler	113	101	▼12
Total		203	203	

== Municipal elections ==
Five Philadelphia City Council seats were up for election in Pennsylvania's general election due to resignations from the incumbents to run for mayor.

== Pennsylvania ballot measures ==
No statewide ballot measures were on the ballot in 2022.

== See also ==
- Elections in Pennsylvania
- Electoral reform in Pennsylvania
- Bilingual elections requirement for Pennsylvania (per Voting Rights Act Amendments of 2006)
- Political party strength in Pennsylvania
- Politics of Pennsylvania
