= Liberal Party of Pennsylvania =

American minor political party

- Chairman: Jennifer Moore
- Secretary: John Waldenberger, Sarah Dever
- Founder: Gus Tatlas, Jenn Moore, Steve Scheetz, Nicole Shultz
- Founded: April 2022; 4 years ago
- Split from: Libertarian Party of Pennsylvania
- Ideology: Libertarianism; Classical liberalism
- National affiliation: Liberal Party USA

Website
- keystone.party

The Liberal Party of Pennsylvania is a third party in Pennsylvania founded as the Keystone Party of Pennsylvania in 2022, rebranding to the Liberal moniker in 2024, with a focus on political solutions through the electoral process and classical liberalism having split from the Libertarian Party for "veering too hard to the right."

== Keystone Party ==
=== Establishment ===
Logo of the Keystone Party prior to its affiliation with the Liberal Party USA.

The party was founded by members of the Libertarian Party of Pennsylvania who felt the Libertarian Party was "veering too hard to the right". (Note: At this time, the Libertarian Party of Pennsylvania just had its leadership seized by the Mises Caucus) The party's first chairman was the Chairman of the York County branch of the Libertarian Party, Gus Tatlas. The Keystone Party was founded in April 2022 with the stated goal of bridging the gap between the two main parties in the state and to better represent issues relevant to Pennsylvanians. Instead of building their party on divisive rhetoric, Keystone Party leaders purport to seek to build an inclusive dialogue of political issues Pennsylvanians can agree on like governmental reform, fair elections, social and criminal justice reform, individual rights and taxation. There had previously been a call to form a "Keystone Party" in 1912 among various Democratic Pennsylvania Representatives for the 1912 United States elections due to the stranglehold that Political Bosses had over the state party, although, ultimately, the split never occurred.

=== 2022 election in Pennsylvania ===
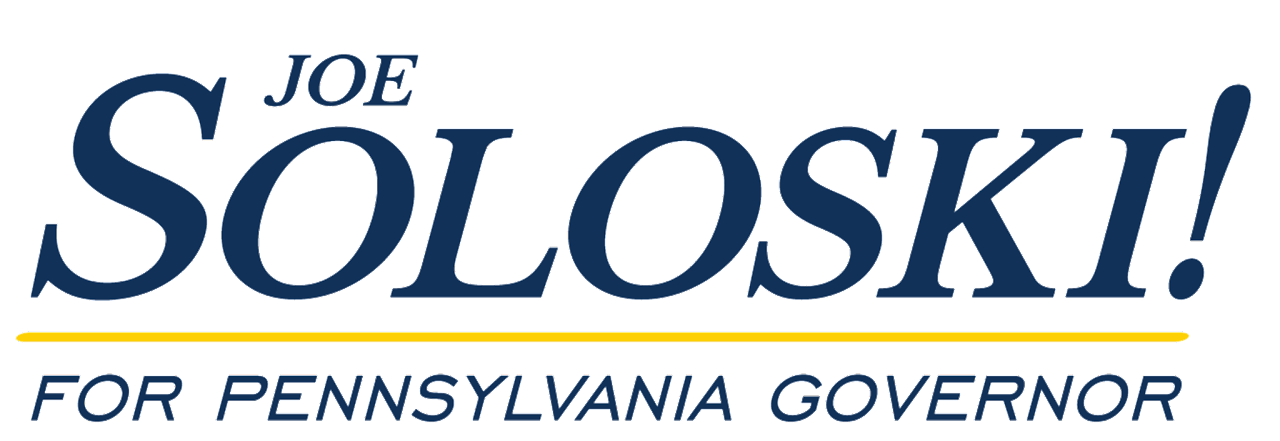
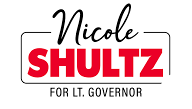
Joe Soloski's (left) and Nicole Shultz's (right), the Keystone nominees in 2022, campaign logos.

The party's candidates received ballot access on August 1 for the 2022 Pennsylvania elections by receiving more than 5,000 signatures of registered voters.

Their candidate for the 2022 United States Senate election in Pennsylvania was Dan Wassmer. Wassmer is a lawyer originally from Nassau County, New York, but now lives in Pike County. A former Libertarian, he was the Libertarian candidate for Attorney General in 2020. He received 25,808 votes or 0.5% of the electorate placing him in last place among options on the ballot.

Their candidates for the 2022 Pennsylvania gubernatorial election were Joseph P. Soloski for Governor and Nicole Shultz for Lieutenant Governor. Soloski is an accountant from Centre County and former Libertarian. He ran for the Pennsylvania House of Representatives, District 81 in 2016 and in the 2020 Pennsylvania State Treasurer election both as a Libertarian. He initially sought the nomination from the Libertarian party, but withdrew and joined the Keystone party. Shultz is another former Libertarian. She originally ran as a candidate for the Libertarian nominee for Lt. Governor, withdrew, and announced her candidacy for the Libertarian nominee for governor. Upon losing that election she joined the Keystone party and successfully sought their bid for Lt. Governor. She is an auditor from Windsor Township, York County, Pennsylvania and had been the Pennsylvania Libertarian Party's treasurer from 2021 to 2022. Soloski and Shultz's ticket got 20,036 votes or 0.4% of the electorate. Like Wassmer, this put them in last place for candidates on the ballot.

The party also stood two candidates for the Pennsylvania House of Representatives in district 93 and district 104 respectively. In district 93 Keystone candidate Kristine Cousler-Womack received 888 votes, or 3% of the electorate falling behind both the incumbent Mike Jones and his Democratic challenger Chris Rodkey. In district 104, Keystone candidate David Kocur received the best showing of the party in terms of percentage. He received 4,838 votes or 29.5% of the electorate, falling behind Democratic candidate Dave Madsen.

=== Post 2022 election ===
==== MarchOnHarrisburg ====
Party founder and leader Gus Tatlas voiced his support for the bi-partisan MarchOnHarrisburg movement, led by Rabbi Michael Pollack, on November 27, 2022. The movement seeks to implement legislation that would result in a "gift ban" to outlaw the ability for members of the Pennsylvania General Assembly to receive "gifts" in exchange for voting a certain way on bills.

==== Dauphin County lawsuit ====
On January 23, 2023, two members of the Keystone party sued Dauphin County for violating their first amendment rights. The two members of the party, Dave Kocur, the party's candidate in the 104th district, and Kevin Gaughen, a former Libertarian who was elected auditor of Silver Spring Township in 2021 and member of the party board, were told that they must immediately cease collecting signatures and vacate from Fort Hunter Park by Dauphin County Parks and Recreation director Anthea Stebbin alongside two security officers in June, 2022. The County stated in their defense that when they purchased the land which would become the park in 1980, one of the clauses of the deed was that no political activities would take place on the property. The pair argued that since it is public parkland, that the clause of the deed is unconstitutional and that the County government shouldn't be allowed restrict First Amendment rights based on clauses of deeds. The pair's legal team, the Foundation for Individual Rights and Expression (FIRE), cited a 1966 Supreme Court case, Evans v. Newton, which states that any local government's property-conveyance restrictions must comport with the Constitution. The county was noted as being unusually confrontational on the issue by the American Civil Liberties Union. The County called FIRE's legal notice a "threat" and refused to negotiate with either the defendants, their legal team, or the ACLU, forcing the issue to reach litigation. On April 26, 2023, the United States District Court for the Middle District of Pennsylvania found in favor of Gaughen and Kocur and ordered Dauphin County and Stebbin to end the unconstitutional ban on political speech in Fort Hunter Park, as well as pay Gaughen and Kocur $91,000.

==== Telford ====
John Waldenberger, a perennial candidate best known for his 2018 bid for the 53rd District switched from the Libertarian party after the Mises takeover and has become the Keystone Party's treasurer. Waldenberger, a longtime citizen participant in the Telford borough council, had been leading an effort to remove Robert Jacobus, a Republican borough councilmen due to his staunchly anti-LGBT policies and is running against him in the 2023 election as a member of the Keystone party. Waldenberger would go on to get last place with 497 votes, however, Jacobus lost his seat to a slate of Republican and Democratic challengers.

==== National party ====
On April 26, 2023, party chairman Kevin Gaughen announced on X that the Keystone party would be taking steps to become a nationwide party by "creating bylaws, adopting a platform, selecting our national board of directors, forming new state affiliates, and possibly nominating candidates". Gaughen stated that the new National Keystone Party would not be "Libertarian Party 2.0" and would differ from the Libertarian party in three main ways. Firstly, the party would exclude "kooks" such as anarchists and extremists. Secondly, the party will not focus on creating "bold" statements and hosting rallies, instead the goal of the party will be to run candidates. And thirdly, the National Keystone party will be professional with "mature public messaging, competent leadership, and we intend to only nominate candidates who we believe will increase the goodwill of the organization". The national Keystone Party never officially formed, as the party instead chose to affiliate with the Liberal Party USA in 2024 instead.

== Liberal Party ==
On March 12, 2024, the Keystone Party announced on X that they were rebranding as the Liberal Party of Pennsylvania and was joining the national Liberal Party USA, a coalition of Libertarian splinter parties that subscribe to classical liberalism and was formerly known as the "Association of State Liberty Parties". The newly rebranded party announced that it would run candidates for Attorney General, Treasurer, Auditor General and United States Senate. Despite that, the party did not run a candidate for Auditor General, Treasurer, nor Attorney General in that year's elections.

=== 2025 elections ===
The party stood Daniel Wassmer as its candidate for judge to the Pennsylvania superior court in 2025, their first contested election since the rebranding, running as the only third party candidate alongside Republican Maria Battista and Democrat Brandon Neuman. Wassmer was described as a perennial candidate and centered his campaign on implementing ranked choice voting in the state. Wassmer, who operates a private law firm, refused to be reviewed by the Pennsylvania Bar Association and therefore was the only candidate who did not get their recommendation. Wassmer would get 71,648 votes, or 1.95% of the electorate, with Neuman ultimately winning the election with 55.93%.

The party also backed Dylan Stevens in the race for mayor of Westover, although the election is officially non-partisan with all candidates having to run a write in campaign. Stevens earned 13 votes; he won the election by just one vote, marking the Liberal Party's first electoral victory.

=== 2026 elections ===
The party did not stand any candidates in 2026.

== Leadership ==
=== Chairmen ===
No.	Name	Tenure	Residence	Notes
1.	Gus Tatlas	April 2022 - ????	York	Former Chairman of the Libertarian Party of York County
2.	Kevin Gaughen	???? - ????		Former executive director of the Libertarian Party of Pennsylvania
3.	Steve Scheetz	???? - ????		Former chairman of the Libertarian Party of Pennsylvania
?	Jennifer Moore	???? -		

=== Executive ===
The governing executive of the Liberal Party is its board of directors. As of 2026 the board consists of the following members:

- Jennifer Moore (chairwoman)
- Avery Rumberger (vice chairman)
- John Waldenberger (secretary, recording)
- Sarah Dever (secretary, transmitting)
- Nicole Shultz (treasurer)
- Steve Scheetz (representative at large)
- Kevin Gaughen (representative at large)
- Adam Christian Reinhardt (northeast representative)
- Joe Soloski (northcentral representative)
- Brandon Magoon (northwest representative)
- Matt Baltsar (southeast representative)
- Herb Bouquet (southcentral representative)

== Election results ==
2025 Pennsylvania Superior Court election
Party	Candidate	Votes	%
Democratic	Brandon Neuman	2,056,528	55.93%
Republican	Maria Battista	1,548,563	42.12%
Liberal	Dan Wassmer	71,648	1.95%
Total votes		3,676,739	100.0%
Democratic hold			

2022 Pennsylvania gubernatorial election
Party	Candidate	Votes	%	±%
Democratic	Josh Shapiro; Austin Davis	3,031,137	56.49%	▼1.28%
Republican	Doug Mastriano; Carrie DelRosso	2,238,477	41.71%	▲1.01%
Libertarian	Matt Hackenburg; Tim McMaster	51,611	0.96%	▼0.02%
Green	Christina DiGiulio; Michael Bagdes-Canning	24,436	0.46%	▼0.09%
Keystone	Joe Soloski; Nicole Shultz	20,518	0.38%	New
N/A	Write-Ins	1,723	0.0%	Nil
Total votes		5,366,179	100%	▲7.05%
Democratic hold				

2022 United States Senate election in Pennsylvania
Party	Candidate	Votes	%	±%
Democratic	John Fetterman	2,751,012	51.25%	▲3.91%
Republican	Mehmet Oz	2,487,260	46.33%	▼2.44%
Libertarian	Erik Gerhardt	72,887	1.36%	▼2.53%
Green	Richard L. Weiss	30,434	0.57%	New
Keystone	Dan Wassmer	26,428	0.49%	New
Total votes		5,368,021	100%	N/A
Democratic gain from Republican				

PA House election, 2022: Pennsylvania House, District 93
Party	Candidate	Votes	%	±%
Republican	Mike Jones	18,751	63.4%	▼36.6%
Democratic	Chris Rodkey	9,956	33.6%	▲33.6%
Keystone	Kristine Cousler-Womack	887	3.0%	New
Margin of victory		8,795	28.9%	▼71.1%
Turnout		16,401	100%	▼41.1%

PA House election, 2022: Pennsylvania House, District 104
Party	Candidate	Votes	%	±%
Democratic	Dave Madsen	11,563	70.5%	▲26.4%
Keystone	David Kocur	4,838	29.5%	New
Margin of victory		6,725	41%	▲38.2%
Turnout		16,401	100%	▼44.2%

== Platform ==
The Party's officially endorsed stances at the time of their foundation are:

- Part-time Legislature. Lawmakers should be required to spend half the year living among their constituents.
- Term Limits. Legislatures should have an undefined but "reasonable" term limit to prevent gridlock.
- Anti-corruption. Seeking greater enforcement of anti-corruption efforts across the state.
- Protection of Individual Rights. Curtailing government overreach and state authority into the lives of its citizens. Ending any government interference over the bodies of individuals. Right to bear arms under the Second Amendment to the United States Constitution. Total marriage equality.
- Reduction of Overreaching Authority. Reducing the number of un-elected officials in the state and ending extra-legislative rule making.
- Budget Balancing. The state should not spend more than it receives in revenue.
- Election reform. Increasing ballot access to third parties. Having independent redistricting commissions. Implement a form of ranked voting and blanket primaries in Pennsylvania.
- Criminal justice reform. Expungement of convictions for victimless crimes. Restoration of rights to convicts. Implement jury nullification in Pennsylvania.
- School choice. Allowing parents to determine which school their children attend be it public, private, charter, or home schooled.
- Environmentalism. Moving Pennsylvania towards green energy with no energy source being subsidized with tax dollars and allowing class action lawsuits against polluters.
- Free Markets. Reducing the amount of government interference in the market to a minimum. Ending property tax in Pennsylvania. Ending land use regulations to their simplest forms.
- Cryptocurrency. removing any and all government regulations on cryptocurrency.
- Immigration. Reducing government inefficiency regarding immigration. Allowing "peaceful people" to seek citizenship.
- Privacy. Protection of privacy as a fundamental right including banking secrecy laws.
- National Guard. Removing any federal control over the Pennsylvania National Guard.
