= Liberty Alliance of Massachusetts =

Political party in Massachusetts

- Abbreviation: LAMA
- Chairperson: Don Graham
- Founded: 1972; 54 years ago
- Membership (2020): ▲19,097
- Ideology: Libertarianism
- National affiliation: Liberal Party USA (since 2022); Libertarian Party (1972–2022)
- Senate: 0 / 40
- House of Representatives: 0 / 160
- U.S. Senate: 0 / 2
- U.S. House of Representatives: 0 / 9

Website
- www.lpmass.org

The Liberty Alliance of Massachusetts (LAMA), previously known as the Libertarian Party of Massachusetts and Libertarian Association of Massachusetts (LAMA), (Note: Only groups with "major party status" are allowed to use the term "party" in their name per Massachusetts law, as such, when the Libertarian Party of Massachusetts doesn't receive enough votes for "major party status" they change their name to the Libertarian Association of Massachusetts) is a libertarian political party in Massachusetts. It was affiliated with the national Libertarian Party from its founding until 2022, and is now affiliated with Liberal Party USA.

Under the system of political parties and political designations in Massachusetts, the Libertarian Association is often the only third political party to receive enough votes to become an officially recognized party alongside the Republican Party and Democratic Party; although the Green-Rainbow Party is sometimes electorally successful enough to qualify. After losing it in 2020, it regained major party status due to the results of the 2022 elections before losing it again in 2024.

== History ==
Former presidential candidate Ed Clark and Rebecca Shipman, the affiliate's gubernatorial candidate, spoke at the 1982 state convention at the Holiday Inn in Somerville which was attended by the majority of the two hundred registered Libertarians in the state. Later the party attempted to challenge the 40,000 signature requirement to appear on the ballot and force the Secretary of State to accept the 10,000 signatures they had gathered, but the district court rejected the injunction due to "vagueness" in their affidavits.

In the 2002 Senate election the Republican failed to appear on the ballot for the first time in Massachusetts history, coincidentally the previous Republican candidate in 1996 was Bill Weld, resulting in John Kerry's only opponent being Libertarian Michael Cloud which resulted in most conservatives voting for Kerry, but a significant amount voted for Cloud giving him 18.4% of the vote which at the time was the best percentage showing for a Libertarian in a Senate race until Joe Miller received nearly 30% in 2016, but they still hold the total vote record.

At the party's 2018 convention, it formally endorsed ranked-choice voting and nominated candidates for the 2018 midterm elections. Dan Fishman, the political director for the party, ran to be State Auditor of Massachusetts. His campaign was noted for securing an endorsement by the Boston Globe. Fishman ultimately received 4% of vote in his run which secured ballot access for the Massachusetts state party affiliate.

On April 16, 2019, the party's former political director, Dan Fishman, was appointed to be the executive director for the Libertarian Party of the United States.

On June 5, 2022, the party severed its affiliation with the national Libertarian Party in response to the Libertarian National Committee recognizing alternate leadership of the state party.

In the 2022 general election, the party ran candidates for governor, U.S. House, auditor, and treasurer. The treasurer election in particular was an opportunity for the Libertarians to regain party status after losing it in 2020, given that it is a two-way race and the requirement for party status is 3% of the vote in any statewide election. The party's ballot access efforts in the treasurer's race were successful, with its candidate receiving 23% of the vote.

On December 3, 2022, the party affiliated with the Association of Liberty State Parties at the national level.

In 2024 the party had another split, with dissidents leaving to form the Prosperity and Freedom political group alongside dissidents from the ULM to form a third libertarian group in the state. In 2025, the party renamed itself the Liberty Alliance of Massachusetts.

== Electoral performance ==
The best Libertarian showing in Massachusetts in a vote for President of the United States was in the 2016 United States presidential election in Massachusetts when the Libertarian Party's ticket won 4.2% of the vote. Former Massachusetts Republican Governor Bill Weld was on that ticket as the vice president candidate, with Gary Johnson, the candidate for president.

The Libertarian Association of Massachusetts had the best percentage showing of any Libertarian candidate in a race for U.S. Senate until Joe Miller's candidacy in the 2016 United States Senate election in Alaska. Carla Howell in the 2000 United States Senate election in Massachusetts had won 11.9% and Michael Cloud in the 2002 United States Senate election in Massachusetts won 18.4% in a two-person race with Democratic John Kerry and no Republican on the ballot.

=== Presidential ===
Year	Presidential nominee	Votes
1972	John Hospers (Write-in)	43 (nil %)
1976	Roger MacBride (Write-in)	135 (nil %)
1980	Ed Clark	22,038 (0.9%)
1984	David Bergland	Not on ballot
1988	Ron Paul	24,251 (0.9%)
1992	Andre Marrou	7,458 (0.3%)
1996	Harry Browne	20,426 (0.8%)
2000	Harry Browne	16,366 (0.6%)
2004	Michael Badnarik	15,022 (0.5%)
2008	Bob Barr	13,189 (0.4%)
2012	Gary Johnson	30,920 (1.0%)
2016	Gary Johnson	138,018 (4.2%)
2020	Jo Jorgensen	47,013 (1.3%)

=== House ===
Year	House candidates	Votes	Change
2010	None	None	Steady
2012	1	16,668 (0.7%)	▲0.7%
2014	None	None	▼0.7%
2016	1	27,511 (0.9%)	▲0.9%
2018	None	None	▼0.9%
2022	1	5,995 (0.25%)	▲0.25%

=== Senate Class I ===
Year	Senate nominee	Votes	Change
2002	Michael Cloud	369,807 (18.4%)	Steady
2008	Robert J. Underwood	93,713 (3.1%)	▼15.3%
2014	None	None	▼0.9%

=== Senate Class II ===
Year	Senate nominee	Votes	Change
1982	Howard S. Katz	18,878 (0.9%)	Steady
1988	Freda Lee Nason	13,199 (0.5%)	▼0.4%
1994	Lauraleigh Dozier	14,484 (0.7%)	▲0.2%
2000	Carla Howell	308,860 (11.9%)	▲11.2%
2006	None	None	▼11.9%
2012	None	None	Steady
2018	None	None	Steady

=== Gubernatorial ===
Year	Gubernatorial nominee	Votes	Change
1982	Rebecca Shipman	17,918 (0.9%)	▲1.7%
1986	None	None	▼0.9%
1994	None	None	Steady
1998	Dean Cook	32,184 (1.7%)	▲1.7%
2002	Carla Howell	23,044 (1.1%)	▼0.6%
2022	Kevin Reed	39,244 (1.6%)	

== See also ==
- Joseph L. Kennedy
- Bill Weld – former member
