= Libertarian Party of New Mexico =

Political party in New Mexico

- Abbreviation: LPNM
- Chairman: Chris Luchini
- Founded: June 27, 1972; 54 years ago
- Membership (2021): 12,798
- Ideology: Libertarianism
- National affiliation: Liberal Party USA (since 2022); Libertarian Party (1972–2022)
- Senate: 0 / 42
- House of Representatives: 0 / 70
- U.S. Senate: 0 / 2
- U.S. House of Representatives: 0 / 3

Election symbol

Website
- lpnm.us

The Libertarian Party of New Mexico (LPNM) is a libertarian political party in New Mexico. It was affiliated with the national Libertarian Party from its founding until 2022, and is now affiliated with the Liberal Party USA.

Before 2022, it was a state affiliate of the Libertarian Party from the party's founding in 1972. Since 2016, it has been qualified as a major party in New Mexico. In 2018, it became the first Libertarian Party affiliate to have a statewide officeholder when Public Lands Commissioner Aubrey Dunn Jr. switched his partisan affiliation from Republican to Libertarian.

The party is currently barred from using the Libertarian Party name due to a trademark lawsuit from the national party. It is temporarily known simply as "LPNM".

== History ==
=== 1970s ===
On June 27, 1972, the Libertarian Party of New Mexico filed its articles of incorporation with the New Mexico Corporation Commission. Diana Amsden, Maurice McDonald, and Sidney Light were listed as the original directors. On July 22, the party held its first state convention where seven people were selected to serve on its executive committee and a political platform was approved.

On September 1, 1978, Bob Walsh filed a lawsuit in the U.S. District Court against County Clerk Emma C. Gonzales so that he could be placed onto the ballot for the New Mexico House of Representatives from the 22nd district. Assistant County Attorney John J. Carmody Jr. had advised Gonzales not to place Walsh onto the ballot as New Mexico law required political parties to file their party rules with the county clerk within thirty days after the party organization was formed, which the Libertarians did not do, and that the Libertarian Party did not have a process for nominating legislative office candidates in single county districts. On September 8, District Judge Phillip Baiamonte ruled against Walsh. Walsh appealed to the New Mexico Supreme Court, but the Supreme Court ruled against him.

=== 1980s ===
In 1983, Senate Bill 352, which would reduce the required number of signatures to appear on the election ballot from 3% of the total votes cast in the most recent presidential or gubernatorial election to 1% of the total votes cast in the most recent presidential or gubernatorial election, was introduced at the request of the Libertarian Party of New Mexico. The legislation passed in the New Mexico Senate and New Mexico House of Representatives. On April 7, Governor Toney Anaya signed the legislation into law.

=== 2010s ===
In 2016, the Libertarian presidential nominee, former New Mexico Governor Gary Johnson, received over 9% of the popular vote in the presidential election in New Mexico. By receiving over 5% of the popular vote in a statewide election Johnson gave the party major party status in New Mexico.

In January 2018, Aubrey Dunn Jr., the New Mexico Commissioner of Public Lands, announced that he had switched his party affiliation from Republican to Libertarian. Dunn was the first statewide official in the United States to be a member of the Libertarian Party.

During the 2018 gubernatorial election Bob Walsh filed to run as the party's gubernatorial nominee and Robin Dunn as the lieutenant gubernatorial nominee. However, both filed after the deadline forcing them to run as write-in candidates to appear on the general election ballot. In the primary both failed to receive enough write-in votes to appear on the general election ballot. The party maintained its major party status after receiving over 5% of the popular vote in the land commissioner and secretary of state elections.

=== 2020s ===
The LPNM ran a gubernatorial candidate in the 2022 election, marking the first time in the party's history that it had a gubernatorial candidate appear on the ballot.

On August 25, 2022, citing alleged interference by the Libertarian National Committee into state party affairs, the party terminated its affiliation with the national Libertarian Party. It affiliated with the Association of Liberty State Parties (later Liberal Party USA) later that year.

In June 2026, the Libertarian National Committee obtained a preliminary injunction preventing the party from using the Libertarian Party name. The New Mexico party announced it would temporarily use the "LPNM" acronym as its name while it fought an ongoing trademark lawsuit from the national party, which had recognized the Free New Mexico Party as its New Mexico affiliate. The LPNM blamed the lawsuit for preventing it from running statewide candidates in 2026.

== Elected officials ==
- Laura Burrows, University of New Mexico–Los Alamos Advisory Board
- Veronica Rodriguez, Anthony Water & Sanitation Board
- Kene Lane Terry, Logan School District board member
- Max Tenorio Jr., Luna Community College board member
- Robin L. Dunn, Soil & Water Supervisor 1, Claunch Pinto Soil & Water Conservation Board

== Election results ==
=== Presidential ===
Presidential election
Election year	Votes	Percentage	+/–	Presidential ticket
1976	1,110	0.3 / 100	▲0.3%	MacBride/Bergland
1980	4,365	1.0 / 100	▲0.7%	Clark/Koch
1984	4,459	0.9 / 100	▼0.1%	Bergland/Lewis
1988	3,268	0.6 / 100	▼0.2%	Paul/Marrou
1992	1,615	0.3 / 100	▲0.4%	Marrou/Lord
1996	2,996	0.5 / 100	▲0.3%	Browne/Jorgensen
2000	2,058	0.3 / 100	▼0.2%	Browne/Olivier
2004	2,382	0.3 / 100	▼ nil%	Badnarik/Campagna
2008	2,428	0.3 / 100	▼ nil%	Barr/Root
2012	27,787	3.6 / 100	▲3.3%	Johnson/Gray
2016	74,541	9.3 / 100	▲5.8%	Johnson/Weld
2020	12,585	1.4 / 100	▼8.0%	Jorgensen/Cohen

=== United States Senate ===
Year	Candidate	Votes	Percentage
1996	Bruce M. Bush	6,064	1.1%
2018	Gary Johnson	105,916	15.4%
2020	Bob Walsh	23,842	2.6%

=== Statewide elections ===
Year	Office	Candidate	Votes	Percentage
1990	Governor	Joseph E. Knight	788	0.2%
1990	Lt. Governor	Karia Lee Basta	788	0.2%
2018	Attorney General	A. Blair Dunn	32,931	4.8%
2018	Secretary of State	Ginger G. Grider	34,527	5.0%
2018	Commissioner of Public Lands	Michael G. Lucero	39,791	5.8%

== See also ==
- List of state parties of the Libertarian Party (United States)
