= Sandra Major =

American politician

- Major in 2008

Member of the Pennsylvania House of Representatives from the 111th district
- In office January 3, 1995 – January 3, 2017
- Preceded by: Kenneth E. Lee
- Succeeded by: Jonathan Fritz

Personal details
- Born: September 4, 1954 (age 72) Seaford, Delaware, U.S.
- Party: Republican
- Education: Keystone Junior College; University of Scranton

Sandra J. Major (born September 4, 1954) is an American politician who was a member of the Pennsylvania House of Representatives from the 111th District between 1995 and 2017. Prior to her election to the House, she was Susquehanna County Treasurer and district assistant to former Representative Carmel Sirianni.

== Career ==
Major was elected to the leadership position of Republican Caucus Chairwoman for the 2007–08 legislative session.

== Personal ==
Major is a graduate of Mountain View High School and Keystone Junior College. She also attended the University of Scranton. She is a member of several organizations, including the Pennsylvania Higher Education Assistance Agency.

In 2002, she was named to the PoliticsPA list of Best Dressed Legislators.

== Electoral history ==
Results 2000–2010
Year	Republican	Votes	Pct	Democrat	Votes	Pct	3rd Party	Party	Votes	Pct
2000	Sandra Major	19,614	77%	Angelo Sabbatini	5,713	23%				
2002	Sandra Major	15,191	100%	No Candidate						
2004	Sandra Major	21,619	90%	No Candidate			Jay Sweeney	Green	2,379	10%
2006	Sandra Major	16,013	83%	No Candidate			Jay Sweeney	Green	3,381	17%
2008	Sandra Major	21,430	87%	No Candidate			Jay Sweeney	Green	3,201	13%
2010	Sandra Major	14,358	75%	Jim Knapp	4,027	19%	Jay Sweeney	Green	1,103	6%
2012	Sandra Major	17,750	71%	Jeffrey Dahlander	7,243	29%				
