= Sirianni =

Sirianni is a surname. Notable people with the surname include:

- Carmel Sirianni (1922–1991), American politician
- Giuseppe Sirianni (1874–1955), Italian military officer
- Chuck Sirianni (born 1966), American Supercargo and Dispatcher
- Joseph Sirianni (born 1975), Australian tennis player
- Mike Sirianni (born 1972), American football player and coach
- Nick Sirianni (born 1981), American football coach
- Rob Sirianni (born 1983), Canadian-born Italian ice hockey player
