= Pennsylvania House of Representatives, District 111 =

American legislative district

Pennsylvania's 111th State House of Representatives district
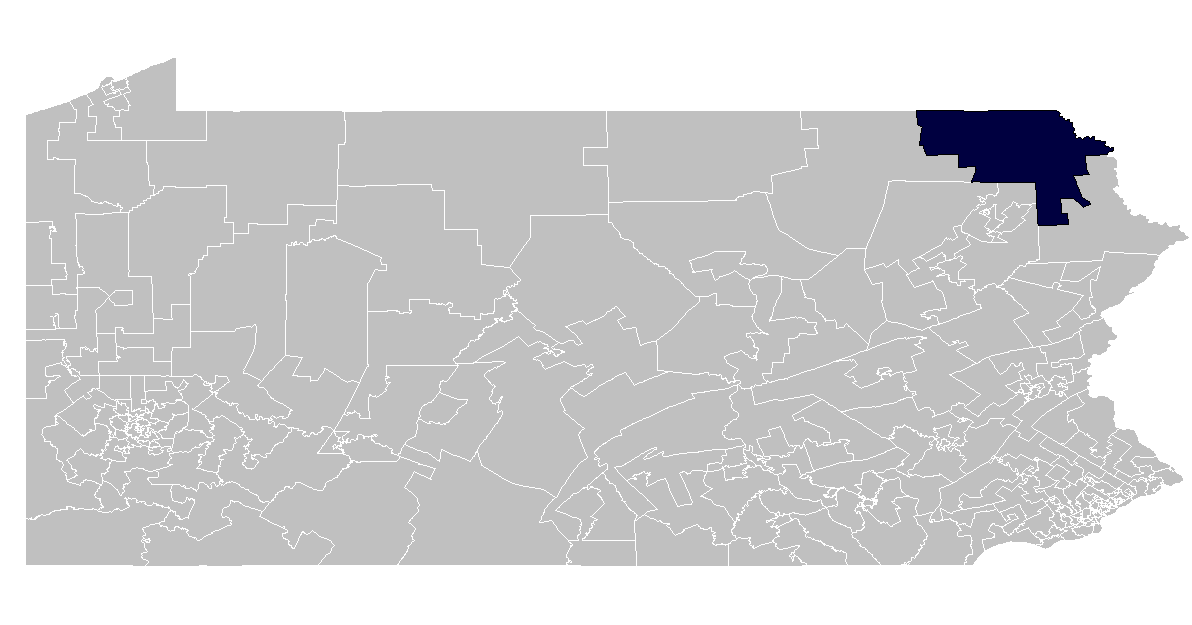
Representative
Jonathan Fritz; R–Honesdale

The 111th Pennsylvania House of Representatives District is located in Susquehanna County and Wayne County and includes the following areas:

- All of Susquehanna County
- Wayne County
  - Berlin Township
  - Bethany
  - Buckingham Township
  - Canaan Township
  - Clinton Township
  - Damascus Township
  - Dyberry Township
  - Honesdale
  - Lebanon Township
  - Manchester Township
  - Mount Pleasant Township
  - Oregon Township
  - Preston Township
  - Prompton
  - Scott Township
  - Starrucca
  - Texas Township
  - Waymart

== Representatives ==
Representative	Party	Years	District home	Note
Prior to 1969, seats were apportioned by county.
Kenneth B. Lee	Republican	1969 – 1974		
Carmel Sirianni	Republican	1975 – 1988		
Kenneth E. Lee	Republican	1989 – 1994		
Sandra Major	Republican	1995 – 2016	Montrose	
Jonathan Fritz	Republican	2017 – present		Incumbent
