= Jonathan Fritz =

American politician

Member of the Pennsylvania House of Representatives from the 111th district
- Incumbent
- Assumed office January 3, 2017
- Preceded by: Sandra Major
- Constituency: Wayne County (Part), Susquehanna County (Part)

Personal details
- Born: November 30, 1976 (age 49) Oregon Township, Pennsylvania, U.S.
- Party: Republican
- Education: Pennsylvania State University (BBA)

Jonathan Fritz (born November 30, 1976) is an American politician who has served in the Pennsylvania House of Representatives from the 111th district since 2017.

Fritz currently sits on the Appropriations, Finance, Gaming Oversight, Insurance, and Rules committees.
