= Kenneth E. Lee =

American politician

Member of the Pennsylvania House of Representatives from the 111th district
- In office January 3, 1989 – November 30, 1994
- Preceded by: Carmel Sirianni
- Succeeded by: Sandra Major

Personal details
- Born: February 11, 1961 (age 65) Muncy, Pennsylvania, United States
- Party: Republican
- Parent: Kenneth B. Lee (father)

Kenneth E. Lee (born February 11, 1961, in Muncy, Pennsylvania) is an American politician who served as a Republican member of the Pennsylvania House of Representatives.
