= 1978 Pennsylvania gubernatorial election =

- November 7, 1978
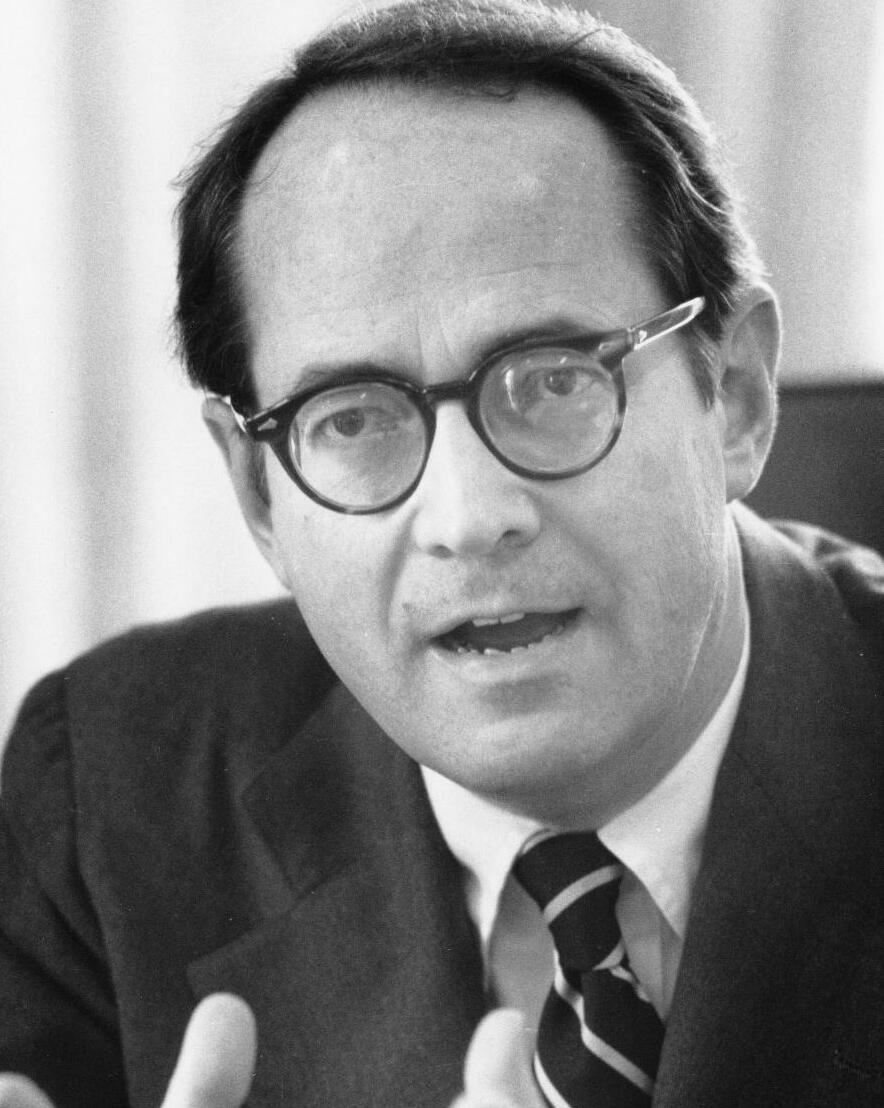

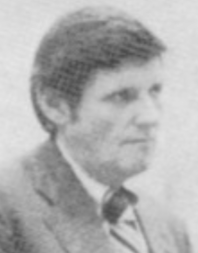
Nominee	Dick Thornburgh	Pete Flaherty
Party	Republican	Democratic
Running mate	Bill Scranton III	Robert P. Casey
Popular vote	1,966,042	1,737,888
Percentage	52.54%	46.44%
- County results Thornburgh: 40–50% 50–60% 60–70% 70–80% Flaherty: 40–50% 50–60% 60–70%
Governor before election
Milton Shapp
Democratic
Elected Governor
Dick Thornburgh
Republican

The 1978 Pennsylvania gubernatorial election was held on November 7, 1978. Incumbent Governor Milton Shapp was constitutionally ineligible to run for a third consecutive term in office. Republican Dick Thornburgh defeated Democrat Pete Flaherty in the general election.

== Democratic primary ==
=== Candidates ===
- Bob Casey, Auditor General (from Lackawanna County)
- Pete Flaherty, United States Deputy Attorney General and former mayor of Pittsburgh (from Allegheny County)
- Ernie Kline, Lieutenant Governor (from Westmoreland County)
- Jennifer Wesner, mayor of Knox (from Clarion County)

=== Campaign ===
The race began with a primary that slated an impressive field of candidates. Flaherty, the former Mayor of Pittsburgh who was known for providing a progressive challenge to urban machine politics, bested State Auditor General Bob Casey, who had lost the Democratic nomination for this office twice before. Casey's campaign was greatly hurt by the presence of another Bob Casey who was running on the ballot for Lieutenant Governor; voters believed they were selecting a ticket of Flaherty and the Auditor General when they chose the Pittsburgh teacher as the Democratic running mate. Lieutenant Governor Ernie Kline, who was frequently known as "assistant governor" during his time in office due to his policy skills, was endorsed by outgoing governor Milton Shapp, but finished a distant third.

=== Results ===
Pennsylvania gubernatorial Democratic primary election, 1978
Party	Candidate	Votes	%
Democratic	Pete Flaherty	574,899	44.89
Democratic	Bob Casey	445,146	34.76
Democratic	Ernie Kline	223,811	17.48
Democratic	Jennifer Wesner	36,770	2.87
Total votes		1,280,626	100.00

== Republican primary ==
=== Candidates ===
- Bob Butera, former State House Minority Leader (from Montgomery County)
- Henry Hager, State Senate Minority Leader (from Lycoming County)
- Alvin Jacobson, a disabled former soldier (from Adams County)
- David W. Marston, former U.S. Attorney for the Eastern District of Pennsylvania (from Montgomery County)
- Arlen Specter, former Philadelphia District Attorney (from Philadelphia County)
- Dick Thornburgh, former U.S. Attorney for the Western District of Pennsylvania (from Allegheny County)
- Andrew Watson

=== Campaign ===
Thornburgh's win came over the Republican leaders of both houses of the state legislature (House Minority Leader Bob Butera and Senate Minority Leader Henry Hager), as well as a former US Attorney, Dave Marston. Former Philadelphia District Attorney and future senator Arlen Specter was considered the front-runner in the months preceding the primary, but the moderate urban Republican's campaign faded as Thornburgh presented himself as a leader that could bridge both wings of the party.

=== Results ===
1978 Republican gubernatorial primary
Party	Candidate	Votes	%
Republican	Dick Thornburgh	325,376	32.63
Republican	Arlen Specter	206,802	20.74
Republican	Bob Butera	190,653	19.12
Republican	David W. Marston	161,813	16.23
Republican	Henry Hager	57,119	5.73
Republican	Andrew Watson	48,460	4.86
Republican	Alvin Jacobson	7,101	0.71
Total votes		997,324	100.00

== General election ==
=== Candidates ===
- Pete Flaherty, United States Deputy Attorney General and former Mayor of Pittsburgh (Democratic)
  - Running mate: Robert P. Casey, teacher
- Lee Frissell (Consumer)
  - Running mate: Betty Burkett
- Dick Thornburgh, former US Attorney (Republican)
  - Running mate: Bill Scranton III, newspaper publisher and son of former governor Bill Scranton
- Mark Zola (Socialist Workers)
  - Running mate: Naomi Berman

=== Campaign ===
Flaherty out-polled Thornburgh by double-digit margins for much of the campaign, but the Republican candidate used highly effective strategies to close the gap in the weeks leading up to election night. Thornburgh was successful in recruiting suburban moderates, as fellow moderate Republican Specter encouraged his metro Philadelphia supporters to rally behind Thornburgh. In contrast, the liberal Flaherty had trouble reaching out to conservative Democrats outside of his Western Pennsylvania base, a problem hindered by Casey's tepid support for the candidate over the lieutenant gubernatorial issue. Thornburgh also aggressively courted traditionally Democratic-leaning groups and gained the endorsements of the NAACP and several labor unions. Democratic support slowly waned under this strategy, which allowed Thornburgh to take a close victory.

=== Results ===
Percentage of each county that voted for the Socialist Workers ticket Socialist Workers: >0.9% 0.8–0.9% 0.7–0.8% 0.6–0.7% 0.5–0.6% 0.4–0.5% 0.3–0.4% 0.2–0.3% 0.1–0.2% 0–0.1%; No votes

Pennsylvania gubernatorial election, 1978
Party	Candidate	Running mate	Votes	Percentage
Republican	Dick Thornburgh	Bill Scranton III	1,996,042	52.54%
Democratic	Pete Flaherty	Bob Casey	1,737,888	46.44%
Socialist Workers	Mark Zola	Naomi Berman	20,062	0.54%
Consumer	Lee Frissell	Betty Burkett	17,593	0.47%
Write-ins	Write-in		384	0.01%
Totals			3,741,969	100.00%
Voter turnout (Voting age population)				64.60%
