= John A. Lawless =

American politician

Member of the Pennsylvania House of Representatives from the 150th district
- In office January 1, 1991 – November 30, 2002
- Preceded by: Joseph Lashinger
- Succeeded by: Jacqueline R. Crahalla

Personal details
- Born: November 30, 1957 (age 68) Philadelphia, Pennsylvania
- Party: Republican _{(1991–2000)} Democrat _{(2001–2003)}
- Spouse: divorced
- Education: West Chester University
- Occupation: Legislator (retired)

John A. Lawless (born November 30, 1957) is a former member of the Pennsylvania House of Representatives.

== Education and early career ==
He is a 1975 graduate of Methacton High School. He earned a degree from West Chester University in 1979 and has attended classes at Philadelphia College of Textiles and Science. He was first elected to represent the 150th legislative district as a Democrat in 1990 and switch over to the Republican Party two weeks later. During his tenure, he frequently clashed with the Republican leadership in the House Republican Caucus; one newspaper account said that he had "a tendency to tell his party's secrets to the news media."

== Sex Faire controversy ==
In February 2001, Lawless gained nationwide media attention when he began an effort to withhold state funding for Penn State University because of "Sex Faire," a student event featuring information on cervical cancer, sexually transmitted diseases, and safe sex practices that he labeled "classless acts of debauchery." The event also had games such as "orgasm bingo" and an "erotic-foods-guaranteed-to-turn-you-on" table. Lawless and a video crew attended the event, where he filmed tables with literature he labeled pornographic and "gingerbread men and women with artful icing." During the university's annual budget hearing, Lawless and several other legislators grilled Penn State President Graham Spanier on the event. During the 4-hour hearing, Lawless played the much-hyped 5-minute tape that he made at the event, causing several legislators to remark on its relative tameness. State Rep. Dan Frankel told the Pittsburgh Post-Gazette "No, I wasn't offended. You can find worse things in advertisements in some mainstream publications." State Rep. Babette Josephs said "I was very underwhelmed. This is what it was all about?," blaming the controversy on "somebody, it seems to me, with a problem in his personality and it gets played out because he is in a position of power." In a contentious moment, Lawless told Spanier of a Penn State student who made fun of his facial disfigurement in an e-mail message; Spanier responded by noting that the student had complained to a threatening call from Lawless. In the end, the legislature continued to fund Penn State University.

== Career as a Democrat ==
In the 2001 redistricting negotiations, House Republican leaders "eviscerated" Lawless' district, splitting it three ways in the 2002 Pennsylvania reapportionment plan. Lawless said "They shafted me. They took away my base. This was about cowards at work. This is about paying the debts to the boys." He said that he was considering running for re-election in spite of losing his political base or running for Pennsylvania Senate. Instead, in November 2001, Lawless changed his party registration to Democrat.

In that following May, Lawless ran for the Democratic nomination the Lieutenant Governor of Pennsylvania in the 2002 election, placing third. At the same time, he easily won the Democratic nomination for the newly reconfigured 150th legislative district; Jacqueline Crahalla won the Republican nomination and would face Lawless in election that November. In September 2002, Lawless caused a controversy when he was pulled over for a minor traffic violation by a Lower Providence Township, Pennsylvania police officer. Lawless used vulgar language to berate the officer and threatened the police department with a loss of state funds. In the November general election, Lawless lost to Crahalla by a mere 168 votes. Following the loss, he destroyed many constituent-related documents, rather than surrender them to Crahalla.

== Post-legislative career ==
He was one on the plaintiffs in the 2001 lawsuit challenging Robert Jubelirer's dual role as Pennsylvania Lt. Governor and President Pro Tem. of the Senate. When expenditures by the Pennsylvania Higher Education Assistance Agency (PHEAA) were publicly revealed, Lawless, who was a board member, was criticized for using PHEAA funds to purchase falconry lessons for himself at The Greenbrier in White Sulphur Springs, West Virginia. He currently is employed as the Corporate Secretary for the Delaware River Port Authority, although he was escorted by officials from the office in April 2010 because of an undisclosed disability he still collects a six-figure salary for an unknown reason.

Pennsylvania House of Representatives
Preceded by Joseph Lashinger	Member of the Pennsylvania House of Representatives for the 150th District; 1991 – 2002	Succeeded by Jacqueline R. Crahalla
