= Joseph Lashinger =

American politician

Joseph A. Lashinger, Jr.

Member of the Pennsylvania House of Representatives from the 150th district
- In office 1978–1990
- Preceded by: Robert Butera
- Succeeded by: John A. Lawless

Personal details
- Born: August 7, 1953 (age 72) Darby, Pennsylvania
- Party: Republican

Joseph A. Lashinger, Jr. (born August 7, 1953) is a former Republican member of the Pennsylvania House of Representatives.
