= Herbert Fineman =

American politician

78th Speaker of the Pennsylvania House of Representatives

Member of the Pennsylvania House of Representatives
- In office January 7, 1975 – May 23, 1977
- Preceded by: Kenneth Lee
- Succeeded by: Leroy Irvis

Member of the Pennsylvania House of Representatives
- In office January 7, 1969 – January 2, 1973
- Preceded by: Kenneth Lee
- Succeeded by: Kenneth Lee

Member of the Pennsylvania House of Representatives from the 194th district
- In office January 7, 1969 – May 23, 1977
- Preceded by: District created
- Succeeded by: Stephen Levin

Member of the Pennsylvania House of Representatives from the Philadelphia County district
- In office January 3, 1955 – November 30, 1968

Personal details
- Born: July 4, 1920 Philadelphia, Pennsylvania, U.S.
- Died: August 18, 2016 (aged 96) Philadelphia, Pennsylvania, U.S.
- Party: Democratic

Herbert Fineman (July 4, 1920 – August 18, 2016) was an American politician and former Speaker of the Pennsylvania House of Representatives.

Fineman from Wynnefield was first elected to the Pennsylvania House of Representatives in 1955 from the 194th District. Before being elected Speaker, he was the floor leader for the Democratic party in the Pennsylvania House.

In 1977, Fineman was convicted on charges of accepting payments from parents trying to get their children into graduate schools at state-supported universities.

He died on August 18, 2016.
