= Josh Shapiro =

Governor of Pennsylvania since 2023

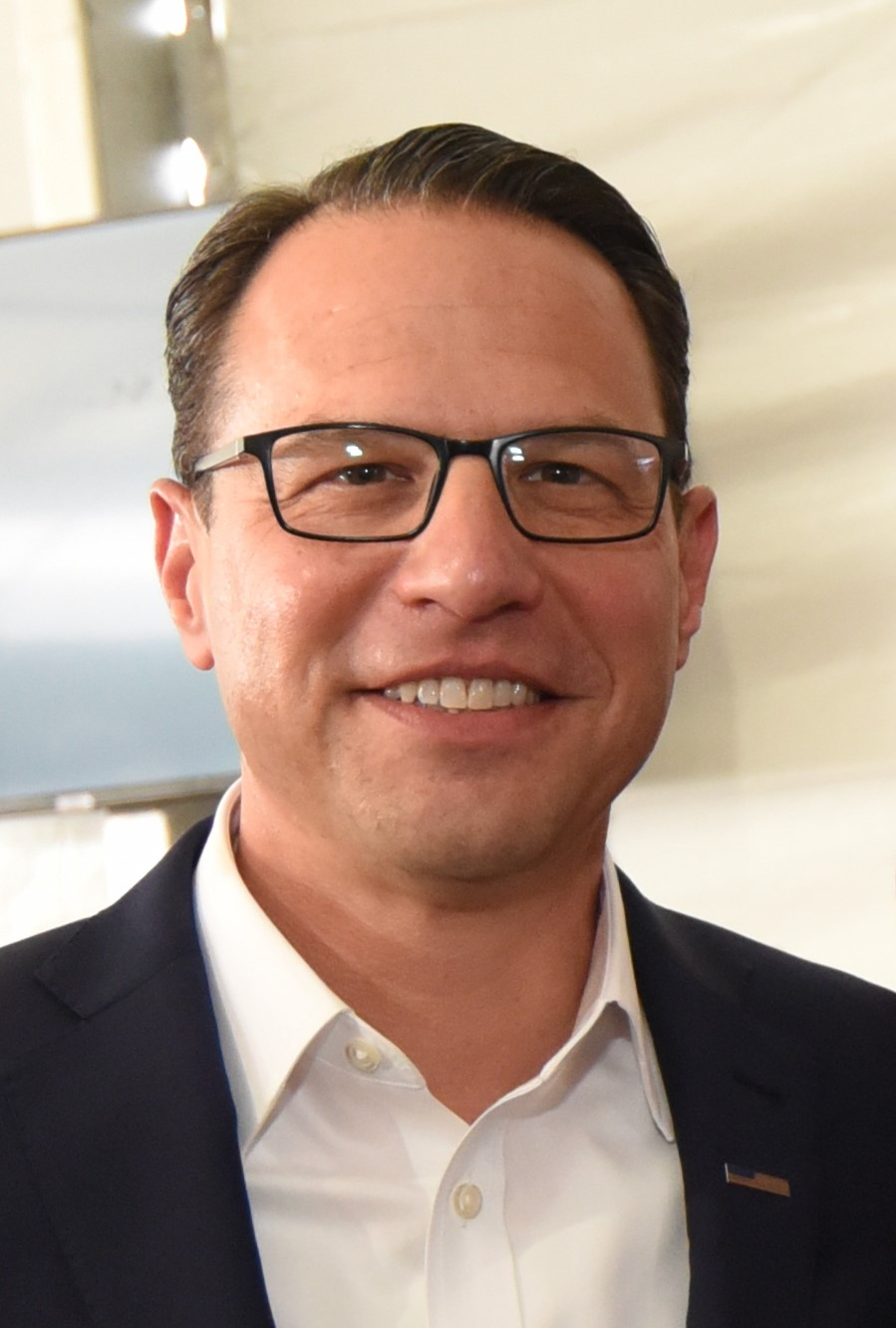
- Shapiro in 2023

48th Governor of Pennsylvania
- Incumbent
- Assumed office January 17, 2023
- Lieutenant: Austin Davis
- Preceded by: Tom Wolf

Attorney General of Pennsylvania
- In office January 17, 2017 – January 17, 2023
- Governor: Tom Wolf
- Preceded by: Bruce Beemer
- Succeeded by: Michelle Henry

Chair of the Montgomery County Board of Commissioners
- In office January 3, 2012 – January 17, 2017
- Preceded by: Jim Matthews
- Succeeded by: Val Arkoosh

Member of the Pennsylvania House of Representatives from the 153rd district
- In office January 4, 2005 – January 3, 2012
- Preceded by: Ellen Bard
- Succeeded by: Madeleine Dean

Personal details
- Born: Joshua David Shapiro; June 20, 1973 (age 53) Kansas City, Missouri, U.S.
- Party: Democratic
- Spouse: Lori Ferrara (m. 1997)
- Children: 4
- Education: University of Rochester (BA); Georgetown University (JD)
- Website: Government website Campaign website
- Shapiro's voice Shapiro on the response to the 2023 Interstate 95 highway collapse Recorded June 17, 2023

Joshua David Shapiro (born June 20, 1973) is an American politician and lawyer serving since 2023 as the 48th governor of Pennsylvania. A member of the Democratic Party, he was the attorney general of Pennsylvania from 2017 to 2023 and served on the Montgomery County Board of Commissioners from 2012 to 2017.

Born in Kansas City, Missouri, Shapiro was raised in Montgomery County, Pennsylvania. He studied political science at the University of Rochester and earned his Juris Doctor degree from Georgetown University. After that, he worked as a senior adviser to U.S. senator Robert Torricelli. Shapiro was elected to the Pennsylvania House of Representatives in 2004, defeating former Republican U.S. representative Jon D. Fox. He represented the 153rd district from 2005 to 2012. Shapiro was elected to the Montgomery County Board of Commissioners in 2011, marking the first time Republicans lost control of Montgomery County. Serving on the board from 2011 to 2017, he held the position of chairman, and in 2015, was also appointed chairman of the Pennsylvania Commission on Crime and Delinquency by Governor Tom Wolf.

Shapiro was elected Pennsylvania attorney general in 2016, defeating Republican John Rafferty Jr., and was reelected in 2020. As attorney general, he released the findings of a statewide grand jury report that revealed the abuse of children by Catholic priests and coverup by church leaders; he also helped negotiate $1 billion for Pennsylvania as part of a national opioid settlement. In the 2022 Pennsylvania gubernatorial election, Shapiro ran unopposed in the Democratic primary and defeated Republican nominee Doug Mastriano in the general election by a landslide. He was reelected in 2026.

In April 2025, Shapiro and his family survived an arson attack at the governor's mansion, hours after holding a Passover Seder.

== Early life and education ==
Joshua David Shapiro was born on June 20, 1973, in Kansas City, Missouri. He spent a few years of his childhood on a United States Navy base where his father, Steven Shapiro, served as a medical officer, before the family moved to Dresher, Pennsylvania, a community in Upper Dublin Township in Montgomery County. His father Steven works as a pediatrician in East Norriton, Pennsylvania, and his mother, Judi, was a teacher.

Shapiro was raised in a Jewish household. At age six, through his synagogue, the Beth Sholom Congregation in Elkins Park, and the Forman Hebrew Day School, he began writing letters to Avi Goldstein, a Soviet Jewish refusenik in Tbilisi, Soviet Georgia, and enlisted others in an international pen pal program he called Children for Avi. He attended high school at Akiba Hebrew Academy in Merion Station, Pennsylvania. He was a basketball team captain during his senior year. During high school, Shapiro spent five months studying and volunteering in Israel with his classmates, as part of a "service project" requirement, which they completed through "a program that took them to a kibbutz in Israel where he worked on a farm and at a fishery". The program also included service on an Israel Defense Forces base, an experience he described as being "a past volunteer in the Israeli army". According to his spokesperson in 2024, Shapiro was "at no time engaged in any military activities".

Shapiro attended the University of Rochester, where he majored in political science and graduated in 1995. Shapiro graduated from the Georgetown University Law Center in 2002.

== Early career ==
=== Capitol Hill ===
After graduating from college, Shapiro moved to Washington, D.C., where he spent six months working in the Israeli embassy's public diplomacy department beginning in April 1996. According to a Shapiro spokesperson, he worked there "to get foreign policy experience. His job largely involved educating the public about Israel." In September 1996, he began working for U.S. representative Peter Deutsch. He also worked as legislative assistant to U.S. senator Carl Levin and as a senior advisor to U.S. senator Robert Torricelli. While working for Torricelli, Shapiro planned foreign affairs tours in the Middle East and Asia, including a trip to North Korea. From 1999 to 2003, Shapiro worked as chief of staff to U.S. representative Joe Hoeffel, who represented parts of Montgomery County, Pennsylvania.

=== Pennsylvania House of Representatives ===
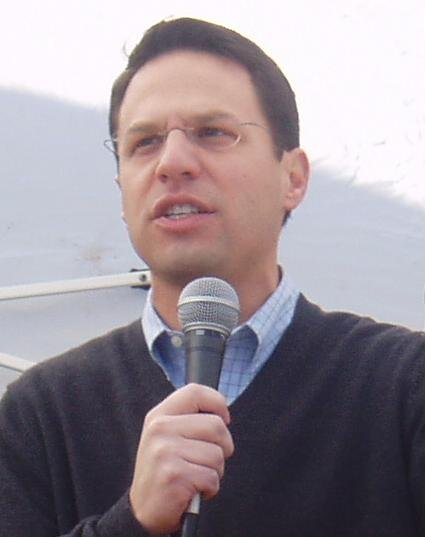
Shapiro as a State Representative, 2009

In 2004, Shapiro ran for the Pennsylvania House of Representatives in the 153rd district. He faced the Republican nominee, former congressman Jon D. Fox. Shapiro trailed in polling at the beginning of the race, but he knocked on 10,000 doors and ran a campaign centered on increasing education funding and better access to health care. He was elected by a margin of ten percentage points over Fox. Shapiro was reelected in 2006, 2008, and 2010.

As a member of the Pennsylvania House of Representatives, he built a reputation as a consensus builder who was willing to work across the aisle on a bipartisan basis. Following the 2006 elections, Democrats controlled the Pennsylvania State House by one seat, but the party was unable to unite behind a candidate for Speaker of the House. Shapiro helped broker a deal that resulted in the election of moderate Republican Dennis O'Brien as Speaker of the House. O'Brien subsequently named Shapiro as deputy speaker of the house. In 2008, following revelations that Democratic House minority leader Bill DeWeese was involved in a corruption scandal, Shapiro called for him to step down, citing him as a "symbol of a broken system" and arguing that DeWeese remaining in leadership would hurt Democrats statewide in the 2008 elections.

In 2007 and 2009, Shapiro introduced three separate bills into the House to divest state funds from Iran and later Sudan. The "bill and similar efforts around the country make a moral argument against investing in countries with a history of terror or genocide." "The idea of pulling out of companies that do business with Iran is based on earlier such efforts that crippled the apartheid South African government. But thus far, the South African campaign has not been replicated." In 2010, Shapiro, U.S. senator Bob Casey, and state representative Dan Frankel pushed for national legislation to allow states' pension funds to divest from business engaging with Iran.

While a state representative, Shapiro was one of the first public backers of then-Senator Barack Obama's candidacy for president in 2008. This was in contrast with much of the Pennsylvania Democratic political establishment, which supported Hillary Clinton in the presidential primary.

From 2006 through 2017, Shapiro also practiced corporate law at the firm Stradley, Ronon, Stevens, and Young in Philadelphia.

=== Montgomery County commissioner ===
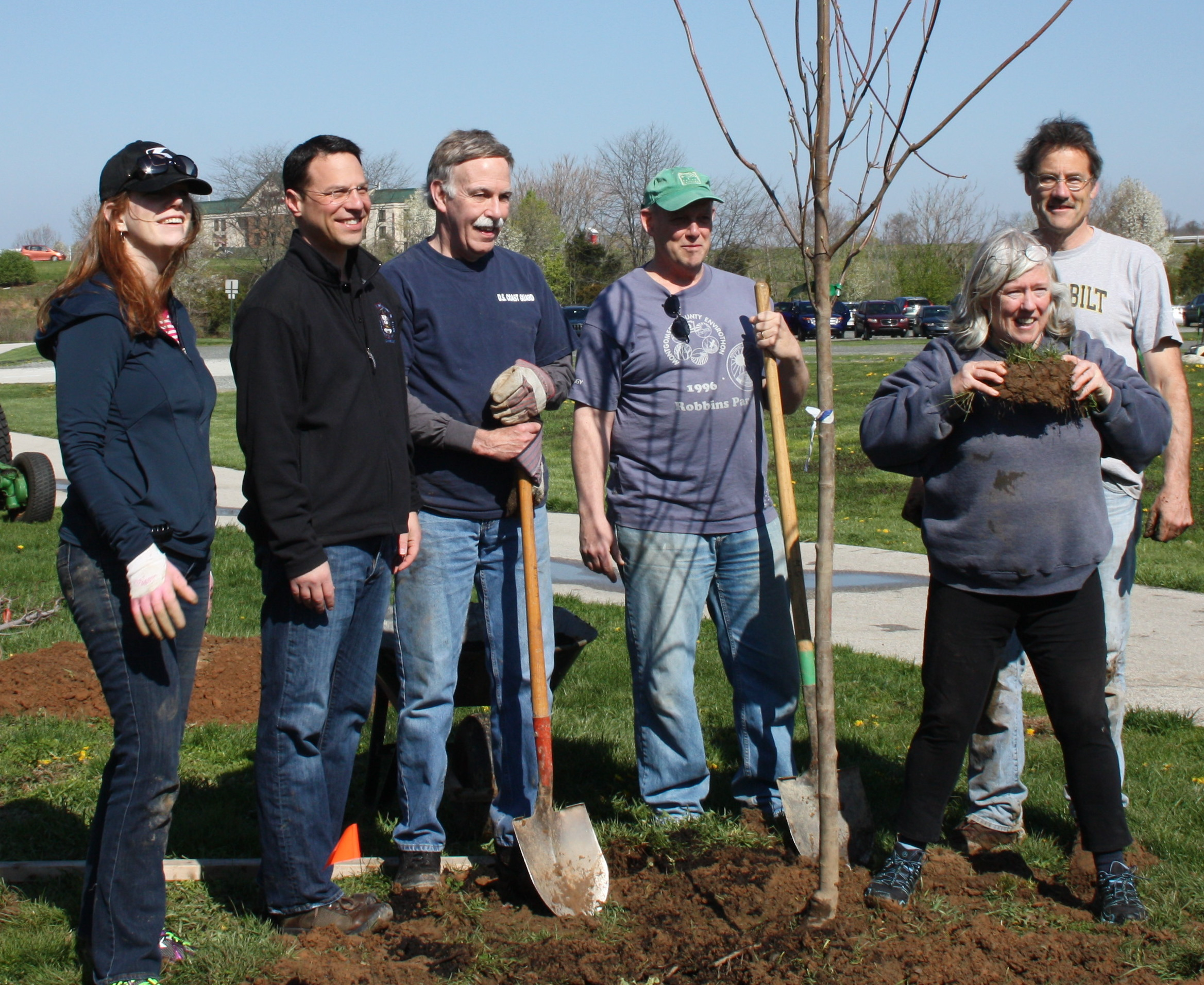
Shapiro at a tree-planting event, 2014

Shapiro won election to the Montgomery County Board of Commissioners in 2011. The election marked the first time in history that the Republican Party lost control of the Montgomery County Board of Commissioners. Shapiro chaired the board from 2012 to 2016.

Shapiro's commission duties centered on social services and administration. Castor, the board's only Republican member during Shapiro's tenure, praised Shapiro's work, calling him "the best county commissioner I ever knew" and "very good at arriving at consensus". In 2016, Shapiro voted for an 11% tax increase, which was an average increase of $66 in property taxes. During his tenure, the board of commissioners implemented zero-based budgeting and shifted county pension investments from hedge funds to index funds. Democrats retained a majority on the board of commissioners in the 2015 election, as Shapiro and his running mate, Val Arkoosh, both won election.

In April 2015, Governor Tom Wolf named Shapiro the chair of the Pennsylvania Commission on Crime and Delinquency.

=== Campaigns for Pennsylvania attorney general ===
Shapiro announced his candidacy for Pennsylvania attorney general in January 2016. While he had practiced with Philadelphia's Stradley Ronon firm and chaired the Pennsylvania Commission on Crime and Delinquency, he had never served as a prosecutor. Shapiro campaigned on his promise to restore the office's integrity following Kathleen Kane's resignation and also promised to work to combat the opioid epidemic.

His campaign was supported by President Barack Obama, presidential candidate Hillary Clinton, and businessman and former mayor of New York City Michael Bloomberg, who was among the largest donors to Shapiro's campaign. He won the Democratic primary for attorney general in April 2016, defeating Stephen Zappala and John Morganelli with 47 percent of the vote. In November 2016, Shapiro narrowly defeated the Republican nominee, state senator John Rafferty Jr., with 51.3 percent of the vote.

Shapiro was reelected in 2020, defeating Republican nominee Heather Heidelbaugh with 50.9% of the vote. He received 3,461,472 votes, the most of any candidate in Pennsylvania history, and outran Joe Biden in the concurrent presidential election.

== Pennsylvania attorney general ==
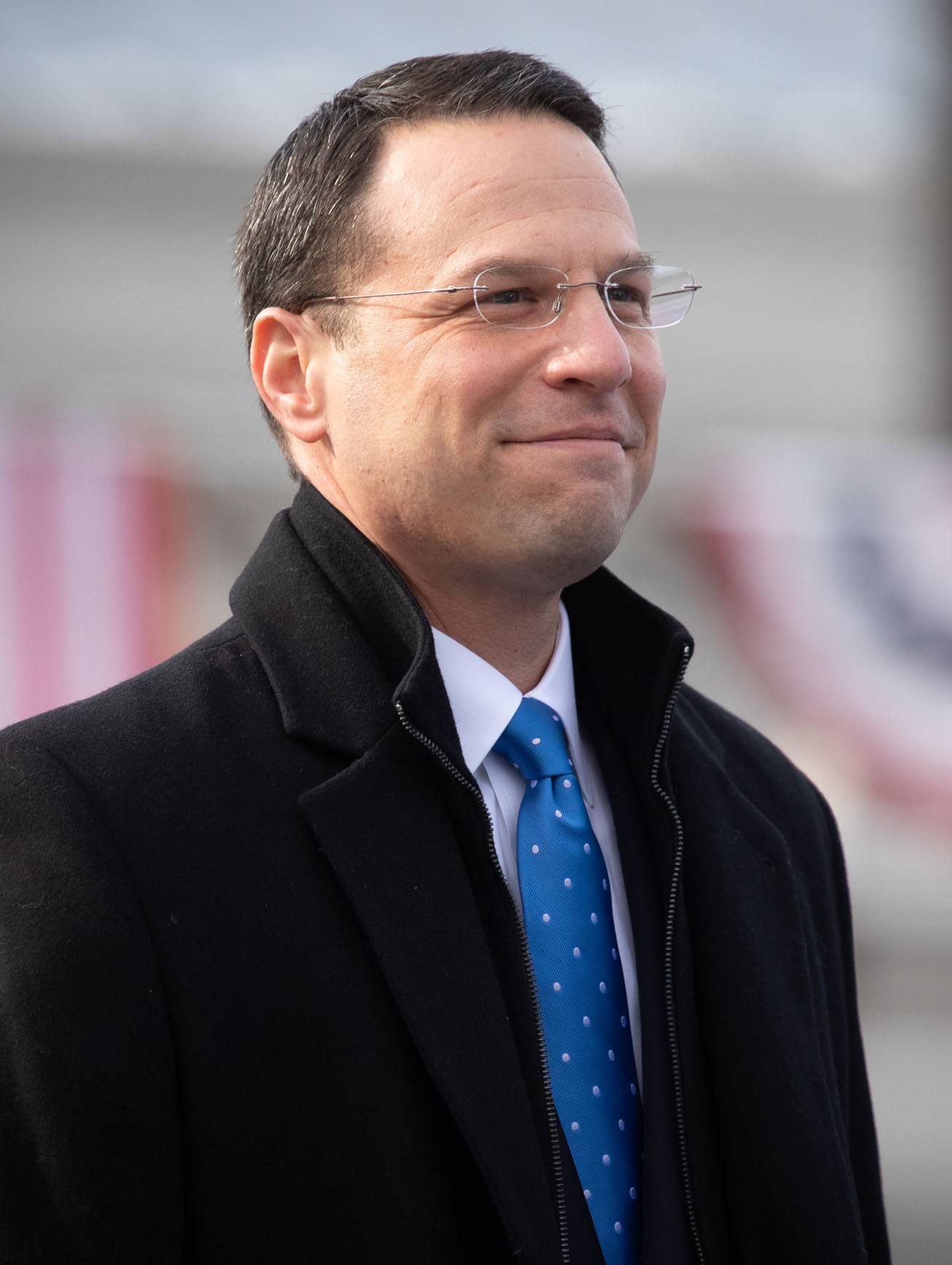
Shapiro at Gov. Tom Wolf's inauguration, 2019

In 2017, Shapiro announced the roundup of a "Million Dollar Heroin Ring" under "Operation Outfoxed" in Luzerne County. All the charges in Operation Outfoxed were abruptly dismissed after allegations that Shapiro had mishandled the sealing of wiretapped recordings.

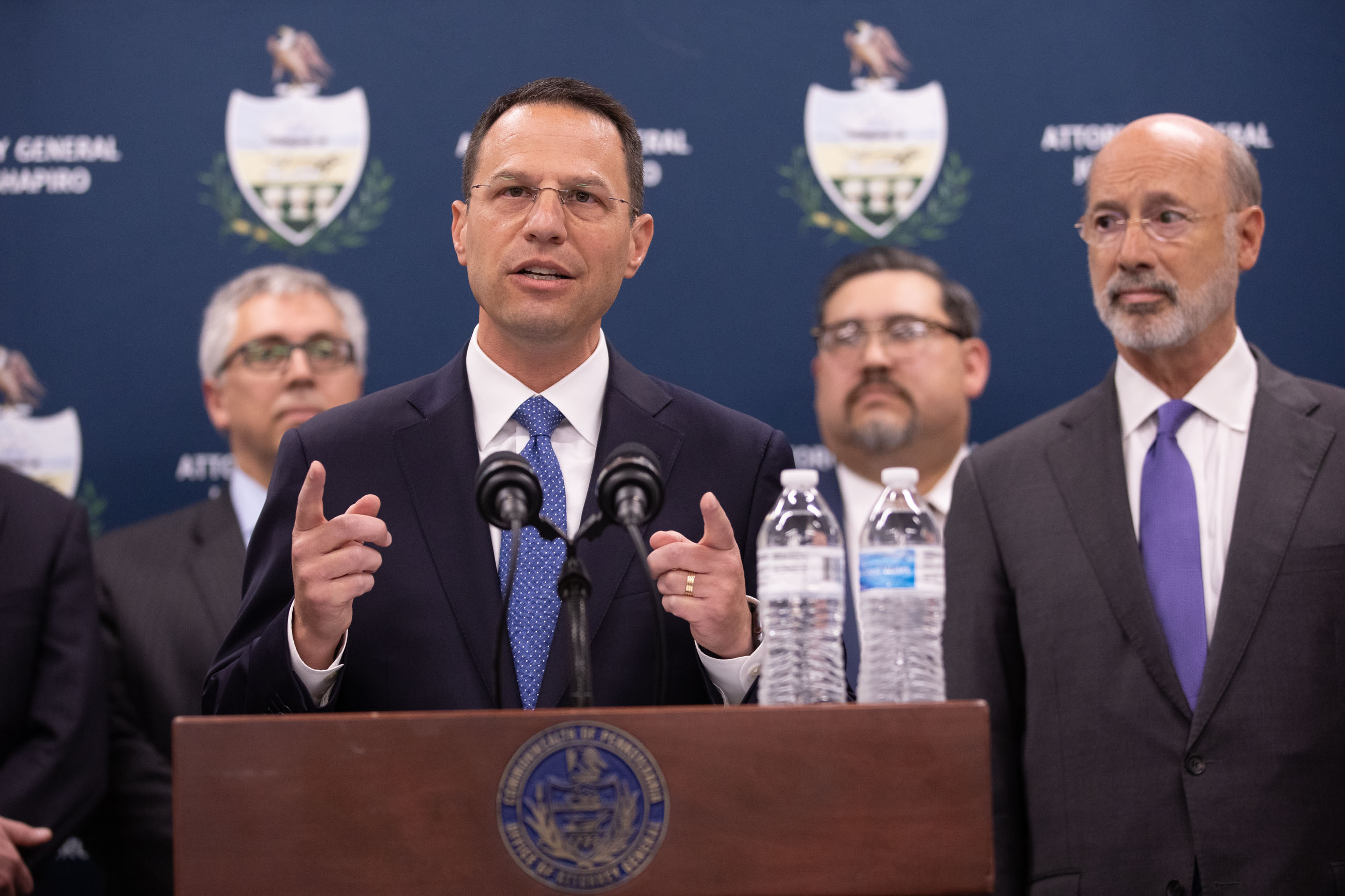
Shapiro and Governor Wolf at a press conference in June 2019

In 2018, Shapiro offered former Bedford County district attorney William Higgins a plea deal for corruption charges. Higgins pleaded guilty to soliciting sexual favors from accused criminals in exchange for lenient sentencing recommendations. The plea deal guaranteed no prison time. Higgins had initially faced a maximum prison sentence of 62 years.

Long before Shapiro took office in 2016, the Pennsylvania attorney general's office launched an investigation of allegations of sexual abuse by members of the Catholic Church. Shapiro inherited the investigation, and in August 2018 released the results of an extensive grand jury report. The report alleged the sexual abuse of more than 1,000 children by over 300 priests. It prompted a similar investigation into the Catholic Church by then-Missouri attorney general Josh Hawley.

In January 2018, Centre County district attorney Bernard Cantorna referred the case of the death of Tim Piazza, a Penn State student who was hazed, to Shapiro, because Cantorna had previously served as a criminal defense attorney for one of the defendants.

In 2019, Shapiro led efforts to ensure that insurance holders of Highmark, a healthcare company, could receive treatment at the University of Pittsburgh Medical Center.

When serving on the Pennsylvania Board of Pardons as attorney general in 2019, Shapiro cast the fewest votes in favor of commutation, denying 24 out of 41 pardons and being one of only two board members to vote against more cases than in favor.

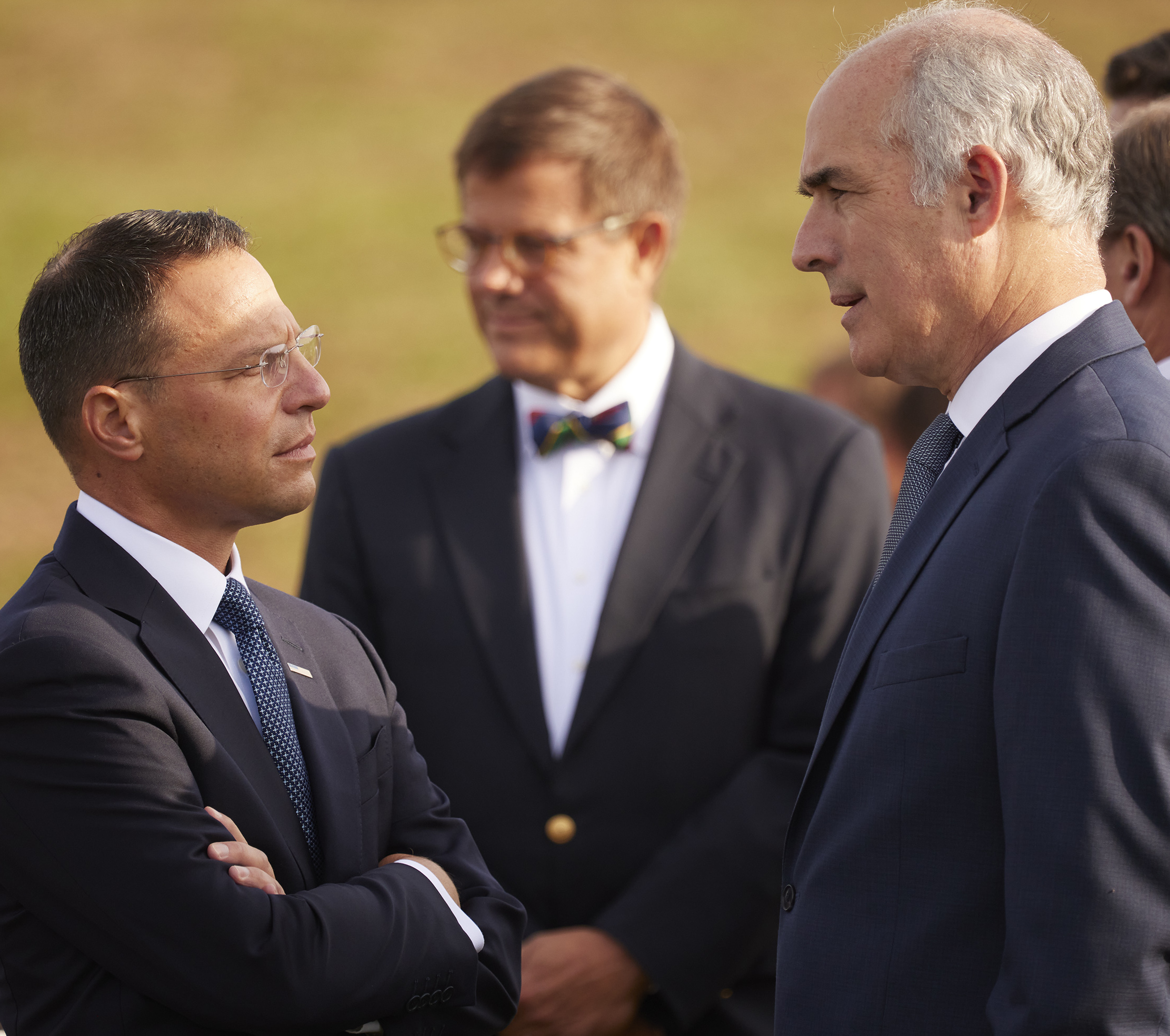
Shapiro with Senator Bob Casey Jr., 2021

In May 2019, Lancaster County newspaper LNP reported that members of Shapiro's office staff had made promotional edits to Shapiro's Wikipedia entry, notably describing him "as a 'rising progressive star' who has 'earned a reputation as a consensus builder eager to take on the status quo and challenge powerful institutions to protect the people of Pennsylvania'". Staffers for Auditor General Eugene DePasquale, Senate minority leader Jay Costa, and Senate majority leader Jake Corman also reportedly edited their bosses' Wikipedia pages. The then-executive director of the Pennsylvania State Ethics Commission said that he did not see this practice as illegal under the state's ethics law.

In 2021, Shapiro announced an opioid settlement with Johnson & Johnson and three other U.S. pharmaceutical distributors that resulted in Pennsylvania receiving $1 billion. The settlement resolved thousands of lawsuits against the companies for their role in fueling the opioid epidemic.

In August 2021, Shapiro settled the largest prevailing wage criminal case in U.S. history. Under the plea, Glenn O. Hawbaker Inc., paid nearly $21 million to 1,267 Pennsylvania workers.

He also joined a lawsuit against ITT Technical Institute, a for-profit educational institute, that resulted in a $168 million settlement (with about $5 million of that going to Pennsylvania students). In 2018, he reached an agreement with federal officials to prevent the distribution of blueprints for 3D printed firearms. In 2019, he came out in support of the legalization of recreational cannabis use by adults, joining Governor Tom Wolf and other leading Pennsylvania Democrats.

=== Conflicts with Larry Krasner ===
Shapiro and Philadelphia district attorney Larry Krasner repeatedly found themselves at odds during Shapiro's tenure as attorney general. According to The Philadelphia Inquirer, Krasner joked that prosecutors who left his office to work for Shapiro were "war criminals" who had fled to "Paraguay", a reference to escape routes Nazis took in the aftermath of World War II. Shapiro condemned Krasner's jokes as "hateful".

In August 2018, Krasner referred the case of a Philadelphia police officer's fatal shooting of Jeffrey Dennis to Shapiro because Krasner had previously served as Dennis's criminal defense attorney. Dennis was in his car when he was "box[ed] in" by undercover officers in unmarked vehicles; three officers were injured after Dennis tried to evade them. In December, Shapiro announced no charges would be filed against the officers, saying, "violations of police procedure do not always rise to the level of criminal charges". Dennis's family subsequently sued the officer and city of Philadelphia for the incident.

Shapiro reportedly supported a bill in the Pennsylvania state legislature that turned over certain powers of the Philadelphia district attorney to the Office of Attorney General, including "the authority to prosecute the illegal possession, sale, or purchase of firearms". Supporters of Krasner criticized the bill as written in hopes of weakening Philadelphia's home rule authority. Representatives Chris Rabb and Mary Jo Daley, who voted against it, attested Shapiro had privately lobbied in favor of the legislation. The bill passed, but garnered backlash from Democrats who said they were not made fully aware of its contents before they voted for it, and Shapiro faced protests during public appearances afterward.

=== Actions taken in response to the Trump administration ===
Shapiro joined several other state attorneys general in opposing President Donald Trump's travel ban, and also sued Trump to block the implementation of a rule that would have made it easier for employers to deny health insurance coverage of contraceptives.

Shapiro was one of 20 electors the Pennsylvania Democratic Party chose to vote in the Electoral College for Joe Biden and Kamala Harris in the 2020 United States presidential election.

=== Actions taken on the state legislature ===
In December 2019, Shapiro charged state representative Movita Johnson-Harrell with perjury and theft of funds from her own charity for such things as vacations and clothing. Johnson-Harrell served two months in prison before being released on house arrest.

In July 2021, Shapiro charged state representative Margo L. Davidson with theft by deception, solicitation to hinder apprehension, and Election Code violations after stealing public funds by filing fraudulent overnight per diem requests and various other expenses through the Pennsylvania House of Representatives Comptroller's Office, as well as hindering a state prosecution. Davidson resigned from office, paid restitution, and was released without bail.

== Gubernatorial campaigns ==
=== 2022 candidacy ===
Shapiro's 2022 gubernatorial campaign logo

On October 13, 2021, Shapiro announced his candidacy in the 2022 Pennsylvania gubernatorial election. In January 2022, his campaign reported it had $13.4 million in campaign funds, which was described as a record amount for a candidate in an election year. Shapiro faced no opponents in the Democratic primary, and secured the nomination on May 17, 2022. He faced Republican nominee Doug Mastriano in the general election.

Shapiro ran on a platform of protecting voting rights, abortion rights, and raising the minimum wage to $15 an hour. His campaign was criticized by some progressives because of his support for capital punishment for "heinous crimes", his public feuds with Philadelphia district attorney Larry Krasner, and his compromising with police unions to pass police reform bills. Efforts to enlist a progressive primary challenge to Shapiro were unsuccessful.

During the leadup to the primary election, Shapiro's campaign released a statewide televised advertisement calling a Mastriano win "a win for what Donald Trump stands for", referencing Mastriano's stance on outlawing abortion and his efforts to audit the 2020 presidential election. The ad was seen as an "endorsement" of the Republican candidate Shapiro would want to face in the general election, with Mastriano seen as too extreme for swing voters to elect. Mastriano won the Republican primary and his closest opponent, former congressman Lou Barletta, later said that Shapiro's ads likely helped. The impact of Shapiro's ads on the primary is disputed as Mastriano was already in the lead.

Before running for governor, Shapiro had supported capital punishment for what he called "heinous crimes". During his campaign, he announced that he now favored abolishing the death penalty in Pennsylvania, a reversal of his previous position. Shapiro was asked in a 2022 interview with Pennsylvania Capital-Star why his position changed, to which he responded:

[The] question is a fair one ... When I ran for [attorney general] in 2016, I said that the death penalty should be reserved for the most heinous of crimes. But then I got elected attorney general and I saw these cases come across my desk. I got closer to a system that I thought was in need of reform. And as attorney general I never once sought the death penalty. As governor, I'd be in a policymaking role, together with the Legislature ... and I thought it was important when asked to state my position unequivocally that I would sign legislation to abolish the death penalty.

Shapiro also said he would not sign any future death warrants for prisoners on death row.

Shapiro supported cutting Pennsylvania's nearly 10% corporate tax rate to 4% by 2025, as well as hiring 2,000 additional police officers across Pennsylvania, saying the "more police officers we hire, the more opportunities we have for them to get out of their patrol cars, walk the beat, learn the names of the kids in the communities". He favors pardoning those convicted for possession of small amounts of cannabis.

On efforts to mitigate COVID-19, Shapiro broke with some in the Democratic Party, opposing mask and vaccine mandates. He prefers educating the public about vaccines' efficacy. Shapiro is also skeptical about Pennsylvania joining the Regional Greenhouse Gas Initiative, a market-based program to reduce some greenhouse gas emissions. He has proposed expanding Pennsylvania's sustainable energy portfolio for utility companies, greater electric car infrastructure and investing in sustainable energy research and development. Shapiro supports a Lifeline Scholarship bill, which creates education savings accounts for children in failing public schools that can be spent on approved expenses including tutoring, instructional materials and private school tuition. He proposed a plan that would have allowed for a $250 gas tax refund per personal passenger vehicle up to four vehicles per household. He proposed funding the proposal with funds from the American Rescue Plan.

Shapiro defeated Mastriano in the 2022 Pennsylvania gubernatorial election by approximately 15 percent.

Before his announcement, term-limited governor Tom Wolf endorsed Shapiro. He received endorsements from former governor Ed Rendell, state senator Anthony H. Williams, former Pennsylvania Democratic Party chair Marcel Groen, and the Planned Parenthood Action Fund. He was endorsed by the SEIU Pennsylvania State Council, four SEIU local unions consisting of over 80,000 SEIU members in the state.

On January 29, 2022, the Pennsylvania Democratic Party endorsed him by voice vote. The committee also endorsed his preferred running mate, state representative Austin Davis. Other union support included the Philadelphia Carpenters Union and Sheet Metal workers, the Western Pennsylvania Laborers' PAC, and the Electricians Union Local No. 5 in Pittsburgh.

Eight former Republican officials, including former Pennsylvania Supreme Court justice Sandra Schultz Newman and former congressman Charlie Dent, as well as the sitting Republican chairman of the Lawrence County Board of Commissioners, Morgan Boyd, endorsed Shapiro, with several calling Mastriano "extreme" and "divisive". Seven more former Republican officials, including former U.S. secretary of homeland security Michael Chertoff, endorsed Shapiro in August 2022 for the same reason.

On November 8, 2022, Shapiro defeated Mastriano with 56.5% of the vote to Mastriano's 41.7%. He won 17 counties. Shapiro's victory was decisive and uniform across the state. The vast majority of President Joe Biden's voters in 2020 voted for Shapiro, as did many independents and a sizable segment of Donald Trump supporters. The only regions where Shapiro did not do better than Biden in 2020 were in "the most economically marginal, heavily minority" parts of cities like Pittsburgh and Philadelphia, where turnout marginally decreased compared to 2020.

=== 2026 candidacy ===
In January 2026, Shapiro announced that he would seek reelection as governor of Pennsylvania in the 2026 Pennsylvania gubernatorial election. On November 3, he defeated Republican nominee Stacy Garrity by a landslide.

== Governor of Pennsylvania (2023–present) ==
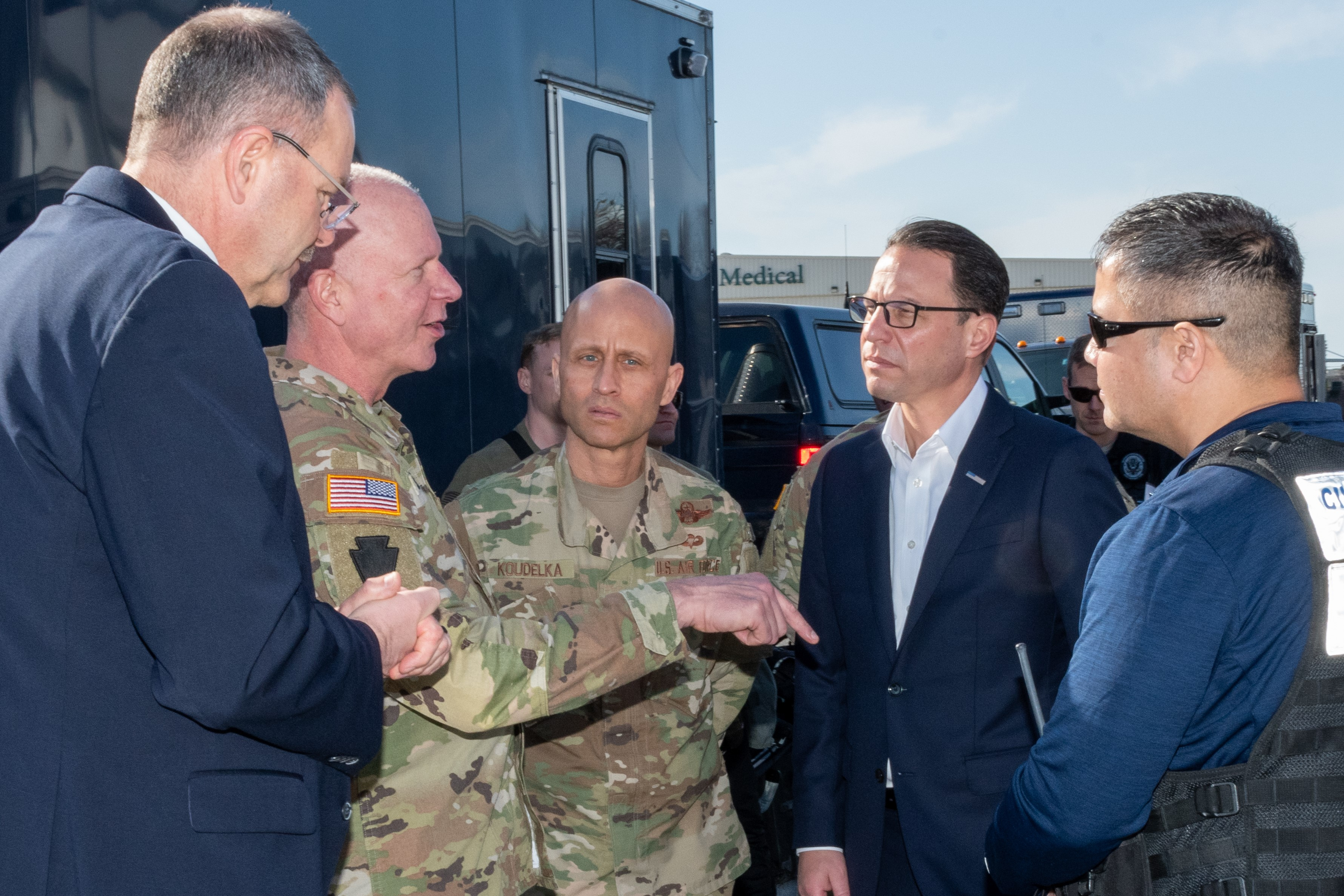
Shapiro meeting with members of the Pennsylvania National Guard during training at Harrisburg International Airport, February 2023

On January 17, 2023, Shapiro was sworn in on a stack of three Hebrew Bibles, including one that was on the bimah during the Pittsburgh synagogue shooting. Often incorporating his Jewish identity into his politics, Shapiro is considered part of the new age of Jewish politicians who are open about their identity. He is the third Jewish governor in the history of Pennsylvania, after Milton Shapp and Ed Rendell. He is also the state's first Generation X governor.

On February 19, 2025, President Trump appointed Shapiro to the Council of Governors.

=== Cabinet ===
On December 6, 2022, during his transition to the governorship, it was reported that Shapiro tapped several of his longtime aides to serve in high-ranking positions, including naming his campaign manager Dana Fritz as his chief of staff. In January 2023, he appointed Akbar Hossain, an executive to his transition team, to be secretary of policy and named his longtime aide Mike Vereb to be secretary of legislative affairs. Vereb served in that position until he resigned in late September after he was accused of sexual harassment of a female staffer. He was replaced by Thomas "T. J." Yablonski, a senior adviser in the governor's office.

Shapiro's administration was accused of covering up the sexual harassment incident after it was revealed Vereb had remained in his position months after the accusations were made. Shapiro defended his administration's actions, saying that an investigation into the allegations against Vereb is under way. He added, "Obviously these investigations—and again, I'm speaking generally, and I think it's really important that you understand that—these things don't happen overnight. They can be lengthy processes. But it's important, and I know this from my time as attorney general advocating for victims, it's really important to make sure that everyone be heard and that the process be thorough and complete." Weeks later, Spotlight PA revealed that, three weeks before Vereb's resignation, Shapiro's administration had reached a settlement for $295,000 with Vereb's accusers that included a clause preventing all parties involved from publicly discussing its details.

=== Fiscal policies ===
During Shapiro's first two years in office, Pennsylvania's credit rating increased three times (according to Standard & Poor, Fitch Ratings, and Moody's Investors Service), and its score is the state's highest since 2013. He proposed lowering corporate income taxes from 8.99% to 4.99% by 2026. At an event with Janet Yellen in July 2024, Shapiro reiterated his support for "aggressive" corporate tax cuts.

In February 2024, Shapiro unveiled his proposed $48.3 billion state budget for the 2024 and 2025 fiscal year, mostly consisting of funding public schools, public transit, higher education and infrastructure, with tax collections projected to increase by $1 billion. Critics argued that the budget would inflate the state's deficit to over $6 billion by 2028 and lead to large tax increases. Ultimately, Shapiro rolled back some of his proposals and signed a $47.6 billion budget in July.

Shapiro proposed increasing career and technical training in high schools, tripling state funding for apprenticeships and union skills programs and creating a Pennsylvania office of workforce development. He supports unions and has vowed to veto any "right to work" legislation.

==== Workforce ====
As governor, Shapiro said he has focused on expanding Pennsylvania's workforce. The day after his inauguration, he signed an executive order eliminating the four-year college degree requirement for 92% of state government jobs, fulfilling a campaign promise. On July 31, he issued an executive order establishing the Commonwealth Workers Transformation Program (CWTP), which provides grants to ensure that companies and contractors have the skilled workforce required. As part of the program, as much as $400 million could be used for workforce training in Pennsylvania until 2028.

On August 28, 2023, Shapiro announced that the college education requirement for state police cadets had been eliminated amid a decline in police applicants. In September, he signed an executive order that established an artificial intelligence board to "assist employees in serving Pennsylvanians, keeping our communities safe and growing our economy". In March 2024, he issued a directive increasing Pennsylvania's use of Project Labor Agreements (PLAs). In May, he issued an executive order establishing the Hire, Improve, Recruit, Empower (HIRE) Committee to attempt to fill in roughly 600 open positions in the state government as well as ensuring the retention of high-performing employees.

==== Pensions and employee contracts ====
After assuming office, Shapiro pledged to decrease the power outside investment contractors have over state pension funds. During his first year in office, he appointed financers Wendell Young, Uri Monson, and Bob Mensch to the State Employees' Retirement System (SERS), a $35 billion-asset board that manages pension reform. On November 6, Shapiro appointed Gregory C. Thall, a former budget secretary under Wolf, as the new chairman of SERS after Chris Santa Maria announced his retirement.

Over three days in December 2023, dozens of Philadelphia transit officers staged a strike over a contract dispute with SEPTA, a standoff that had begun over eight months earlier. Shapiro intervened in the strike and negotiated with the officers and SEPTA, leading to a three-year contract that included a 13% raise increase for the officers over the next 36 months. SEPTA chief executive officer Leslie Richards said Shapiro played "a key role bringing people together to forge this agreement".

On several occasions, Shapiro has proposed raising Pennsylvania's minimum wage from $7.25 per hour to $15. In June 2023, the Pennsylvania House of Representatives voted to pass a bill that would increase the minimum wage to $15 by 2026, but the Republican-controlled State Senate thwarted the legislation. Shapiro had hinted he would have signed the bill into law if it had passed both chambers of the General Assembly, as Pennsylvania had not raised the minimum wage since 2009. In 2024, Shapiro and other Democratic lawmakers attempted to include a raise in the minimum wage in that year's state budget, but due to Republican criticism, the proposal was withdrawn.

=== Transportation ===
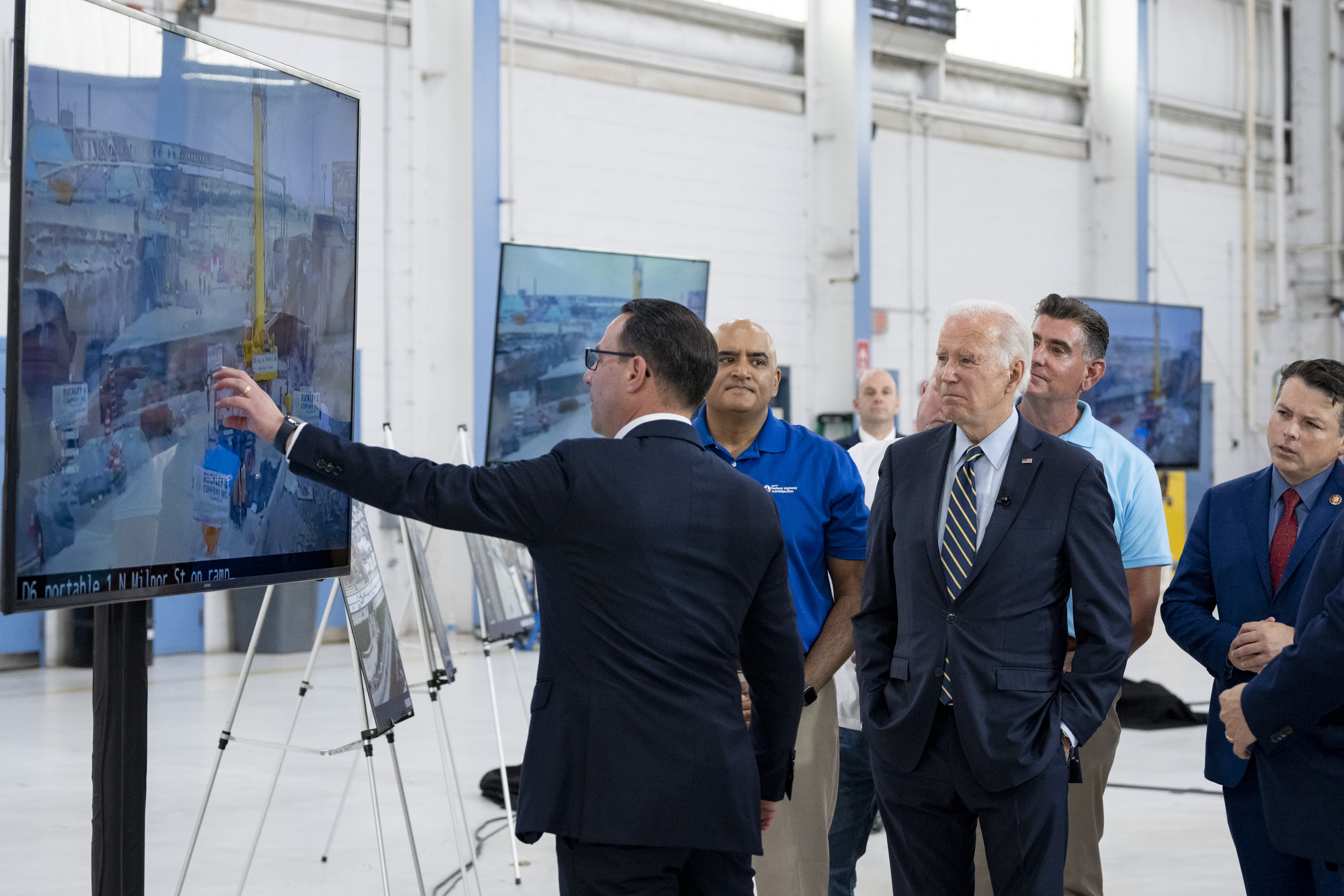
Shapiro explaining details of the Interstate 95 highway collapse to President Joe Biden, June 2023

In February 2023, Shapiro criticized the management of the Norfolk Southern Railway after it failed to contact Pennsylvania officials following the derailment of a train carrying harmful chemicals in Ohio, adjacent to the Pennsylvania border. He called for the railway company to take "a safer overall approach" and called on the Pipeline and Hazardous Materials Safety Administration to revisit the need for more advanced safety and braking equipment in trains.

On June 11, 2023, Shapiro issued a "disaster emergency" proclamation after part of Interstate 95 collapsed in Philadelphia. As much as $7 million in state funds were provided for reconstruction work. The proclamation also authorized the Pennsylvania Emergency Management Agency, the Pennsylvania Department of Transportation, and the Pennsylvania State Police to use available resources to respond to the collapse.

Under Shapiro's leadership, the collapsed portion of I-95 was rebuilt in less than two weeks. Shapiro received praise for his response to the collapse. President Biden said that Shapiro did "one heck of a job" in responding to the collapse; Minority Leader Brian J. O'Neill of the Philadelphia City Council said, "you couldn't ask for more from the governor." A Quinnipiac University poll found that 74% of statewide voters approved of Shapiro's handling of the crisis.

Shapiro proposed investing $282.8 million (a 1.75% increase) in funding for public transit systems in the 2024 budget, which would generate $1.5 billion for transit funding until 2029. The initial funding proposal was dropped from the budget in July, and SEPTA was given an $80.5 million budget extension to keep it solvent until the fall legislative session. In 2025, Shapiro was again unable to secure long-term, dedicated funding for SEPTA, instead requiring the organization to flex $364 million from its capital budget to fund operations after a court ordered the reversal of service cuts.

=== Education ===
During the drafting of the state budget in mid-2023, Shapiro supported a Republican-led school choice proposal that would distribute $200 million to families for private school tuition instead of sending their children to public schools. Lawyers for several state school districts, along with several progressive organizations, criticized Shapiro and argued his budget proposals had not done enough to benefit low-income schools. He later dropped his support to avoid a protracted budget delay after Democrats in the state House refused to support it.

Early in his term, Shapiro had pledged to permanently extend the Wolf administration's free breakfast program for all Pennsylvania public-school students. The program was permanently extended as a part of the 2023 state budget Shapiro signed into law in August.

Shapiro proposed a $1.1 billion boost for public school operations and instruction during the drafting of the 2024 budget, a 14% increase from the previous year. Through the 2024 budget, about $144 million would financially aid students, a roughly 33% increase, some through existing programs and some through new efforts. A new State Board of Higher Education was established that created performance-based criteria for funding state-related universities. Additionally, the budget initiated over $900 million for special education.

=== Abortion ===
During his 2022 gubernatorial campaign, Shapiro said that as governor he would protect abortion access in Pennsylvania and veto any bill the state legislature passed that restricted or outlawed abortion.

In August 2023, Shapiro announced that his administration would end Pennsylvania's nearly 30-year contract with Real Alternatives, an anti-abortion nonprofit that funds anti-abortion counseling centers and maternity homes. He said he decided to end the contract to better defend abortion access in the state.

=== Immigration ===
In January and February 2024, the Republican-controlled State Senate urged Shapiro to send the Pennsylvania National Guard to the U.S. southern border to help Texas resolve the growing numbers of migrants entering the country, but he declined to do so. In March, after the Senate passed a resolution to send troops to the border, a spokesperson for the governor's office said that it was up to Congress, not Shapiro, to resolve the issue.

Shapiro has criticized tactics used by United States Immigration and Customs Enforcement (ICE).

=== Crime ===
In December 2023, Shapiro signed into law a bipartisan bill to restrict the kinds of activities that are considered violations of parole. At the bill-signing ceremony, he stood next to rapper Meek Mill, who was sent to prison on a parole violation for doing a wheelie on a dirt bike.

In his second month in office, Shapiro pledged to continue the pause on state-level executions Governor Wolf had maintained. He also called on the Pennsylvania General Assembly to abolish the death penalty. In 2024, Shapiro filed a brief in support of an Allegheny County inmate appealing his life without parole sentence. The inmate was convicted of second-degree murder for his accomplice's actions during a burglary.

=== Data centers ===
In June 2025, Shapiro announced that Amazon would invest $20 billion into building two campuses containing AI data centers, one in Salem Township, Luzerne County and one in Falls Township, Bucks County. Shapiro praised the project, saying it would create at least 1,250 jobs, and called it the largest private-sector investment in Pennsylvania history. Jackson Morris of the Natural Resources Defense Council said the deal reserves existing zero-emission energy for the data center instead of consumers. He also said that rising data-center demand could increase consumer prices and reliance on high-emission power sources. Shapiro has said the state can supply energy to the data centers while keeping prices affordable for consumers.

In February 2026, Shapiro called for data centers to pay for their own power and not increase consumer prices, which Politico called an "unmistakable pivot" from his previous support of data center construction. In the same month, Shapiro introduced a set of standards for data centers called GRID (Governor's Responsible Infrastructure Development), which include requiring data centers to provide their own power, have transparency standards, hire and train local workers, and conserve water. In exchange for meeting the standards, data centers may use the state's Fast Track program for expedited permitting of projects. In April 2026, climate journalist Jael Holzman published emails from Shapiro's administration to Amazon saying that Shapiro was "not proposing to ban or even discourage data centers". The emails also showed that Shapiro's administration worked with Amazon to draft the governor's regulatory agenda, and offered Amazon early access to an expedited permitting process, though Amazon declined the offer. After Amazon was asked about its role in a rejected data center, Amazon officials contacted the administration to ask whether they had "outed" Amazon's involvement.

In August 2026, Shapiro signed an executive order setting stricter environmental and transparency standards on data center development in Pennsylvania. The order requires data centers developers to comply with the GRID standards, requires local approval for permits and tax benefits, and bars state agencies from entering into nondisclosure agreements with data center developers.

=== Other issues ===
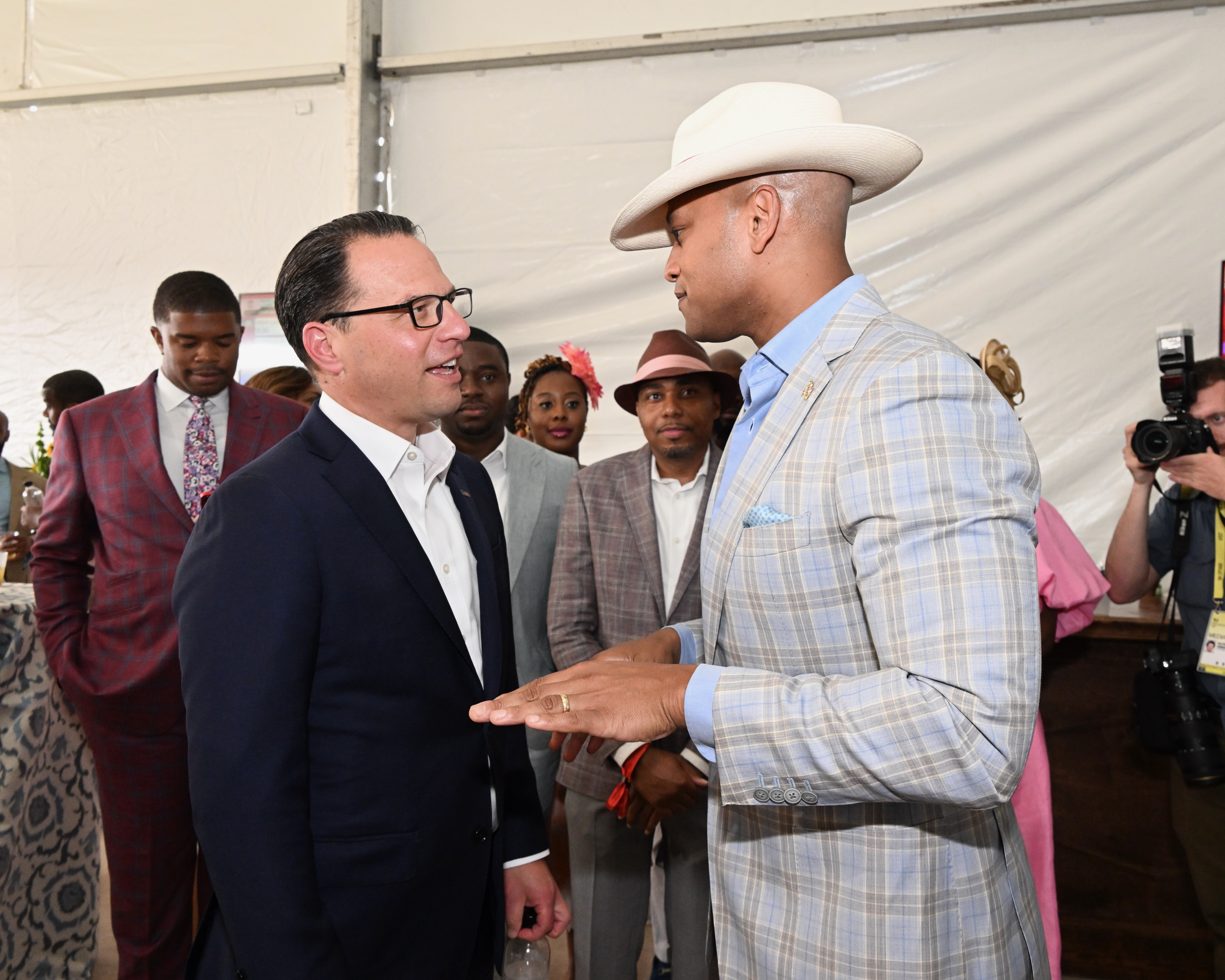
Shapiro with Maryland governor Wes Moore at the Preakness Stakes in Baltimore, May 2023

On September 19, 2023, Shapiro announced Pennsylvania would enact automatic voter registration effective immediately. The process will include voter registration when voting-eligible persons receive their driver's licenses, with the choice to opt out.

Shapiro condemned the attempted assassination of Donald Trump at a rally in Butler, Pennsylvania, where a stray bullet killed one rally-goer. Shapiro said the man "died a hero" protecting his family at the rally and ordered that flags be flown at half-mast in his honor.

In the 2024 Pennsylvania state treasurer election, Shapiro declined to endorse Democratic nominee Erin McClelland in her unsuccessful campaign against Republican incumbent Stacy Garrity. McClelland had criticized Shapiro when he was being considered as Harris's running mate.

When the results of the 2024 Senate election between incumbent Bob Casey and David McCormick showed McCormick ahead by less than one percentage point, the race went to a statewide recount. Shapiro supported the recount, but rejected calls by some, including the Bucks County Board of Commissioners, to count undated or incorrectly dated ballots, which the Pennsylvania Supreme Court had previously ruled against doing.

In November 2024, Shapiro signed an executive order to create the Pennsylvania Permit Fast Track Program, which will streamline and speed up the permitting process for large-scale infrastructure projects that require multiple permits. Since the order's enactment the Department of Environmental Protection's permit backlog was eliminated and the waiting period was reduced. Part of the state budget Shapiro signed into law in 2025 also mandated automatically approving permits within a certain time frame if DEP failed to act.

=== Public opinion and political criticism ===
Shapiro was historically popular in his first two years as governor, despite being the only governor in the country with a divided legislature. A February 2024 Franklin & Marshall College poll found that Shapiro had the highest approval rating among voters compared to his four predecessors as governor at a similar point in their terms. Four polls found Shapiro had at least a 51% approval rating. May and September 2024 polls by The Philadelphia Inquirer, The New York Times, and Siena College showed Shapiro as the most popular government official in Pennsylvania, with a 57% and 59% approval ratings, respectively, including support from a majority across every racial and education line and a third of Donald Trump supporters.

A centrist Democrat, Shapiro has faced criticism from across the political spectrum. The political left has criticized him for his support of Israel, school vouchers, and corporate tax cuts, while the political right has opposed his strict enforcement of COVID-19 lockdown measures during his tenure as Pennsylvania's attorney general.

=== Israeli-Palestinian conflict ===
Shapiro has said that Israel overreached in its military campaign in Gaza, called for an end to the war, and denounced Prime Minister Benjamin Netanyahu, but remains a supporter of Israel.

In 1993, while at Rochester, Shapiro wrote in an op-ed in his college newspaper that peace "will never come" to the Middle East and expressed skepticism about the viability of a two-state solution. Shapiro has said his position has changed since he wrote that and that he supports a two-state solution.

Shapiro has supported cutting off state funding to groups that participate in the Boycott, Divestment and Sanctions movement (BDS) against Israel. He supported calls to apply Pennsylvania's anti-BDS law to Ben & Jerry's. In 2024, Shapiro pledged to sign a bill to block state funding of colleges and universities that engage in BDS, a term the bill defines to include any activity "intended to financially penalize the State of Israel".

In October 2023, several dozen Pennsylvania Muslim organizations signed an open letter coordinated by the Philadelphia chapter of Council on American–Islamic Relations criticizing Shapiro's response to the October 7 attacks. The letter said Shapiro had "intentionally ignored" Palestinian civilian deaths in Gaza. Shapiro's office responded that he was pained by the loss of innocent lives and stood by his support for Israel's right to defend itself.

Shapiro has criticized Israeli Prime Minister Benjamin Netanyahu for his handling of the conflict. In November 2023, he called Netanyahu "a terrible leader" who "has driven Israel to an extreme that has been bad for Israel and bad for the stability in the Middle East". In January 2024, Shapiro called him "one of the worst leaders of all time".

In September 2025, Shapiro called on the Trump administration to send aid to Gazans being starved by Israel, saying that the US "has a moral responsibility to flood the zone with aid and make sure those children that need to be fed get the food and the nourishment and the medicines that they need to be able to survive this". He criticized Netanyahu's starvation denial and said his words were isolating Israel, undermining its "stability and security". After the hostage release and ceasefire deal in October 2025, Shapiro wrote in a statement, "The end of this terrible war now offers hope and opportunity for Israelis, Palestinians, and the entire region."

Shapiro criticized President Trump's Gaza ownership proposal, calling it "unserious" and "illegal on its face under international law". In an interview with The Forward, Shapiro said that "the roots of his faith support for Israel" came from decades of personal experience, beginning with his first visit at age 16. He said, "I don't waffle or waver because of what the polling said, I focus on doing what I think is right", which he said was to secure the release of hostages, end the war, ensure basic dignity and humanitarian needs for Gazans, and keep the long-term hope of a two-state solution alive. Acknowledging that such a future remained distant, he added, "But those views have been cemented by years of having a relationship with Israel, and visiting Israel, not by the momentary blip of a political poll."

==== Response to Gaza war protests in Pennsylvania ====
On December 3, 2023, a pro-Palestinian protest accused Jewish-owned Philadelphia restaurant Goldie of supporting the genocide of Palestinians in the Gaza Strip after the restaurant donated its profits to United Hatzalah, an Israeli medical nonprofit that has supplied the Israel Defense Forces with protective and medical gear during the war. Shapiro visited the restaurant in a show of support and said, "The purposeful gathering of a mob outside of a restaurant simply because it is owned by a Jewish person, well, that's antisemitism, plain and simple."

In November 2023, Shapiro appointed University of Pennsylvania law professor Robb Fox as his representative on the school's board of trustees, thereby obtaining an unprecedented level of influence for a Pennsylvania governor on the school's governance. Shapiro made his first public criticisms of university leadership during the 2023 United States Congress hearing on antisemitism, calling president Liz Magill's appearance in the hearing a "failure of leadership". Shapiro and Fox coordinated with Marc Rowan, a private equity billionaire and board chair of the Wharton School who was leading the campaign to oust Magill. Fox forwarded internal trustee communications to Shapiro's director of external affairs, and speculated with the governor's office about new policies the university could adopt. After Magill resigned, interim president Larry Jameson intervened to appoint Fox to the school's antisemitism task force on Shapiro's behalf.

In consultation with the governor's office, Fox pushed the university to ban Penn Students Against the Occupation of Palestine (PAO) and coordinated with the Penn Israel Public Affairs Committee (PIPAC). Shapiro's office forwarded a document written by students in PIPAC outlining their priorities, which included suspending 16 teachers, adoption of the IHRA definition of antisemitism, and calls "for PAO and various Penn students to be 'publicly punish[ed]." When PAO's status as a campus organization was revoked, it criticized Shapiro's apparent involvement in the disciplinary process, saying, "Instead of working to bring electricity, food, and water to Gaza and supporting the needs of Palestinians in Pennsylvania, Josh Shapiro spends his time attempting to silence students and community members calling attention to UPenn's financial and material support for genocide."

In a March 2024 interview, Shapiro voiced concern for Palestinian civilians and support for peaceful protesters. In April 2024, he condemned pro-Palestinian protests at American colleges after a prominent rabbi at Columbia University urged Jewish students to leave campus and said the university could not guarantee their safety. Shapiro called on local officials to "step in and enforce the law" to protect students.

As protests against Israel spread, Shapiro said universities should not tolerate antisemitic intimidation any more than white supremacy, a comparison that drew criticism from the left. In The New Republic, David Klion accused Shapiro of comparing protesters to white supremacists and the Ku Klux Klan (KKK), saying that demonstrators were not "by any stretch" all antisemitic but suggesting that antisemitic speech is treated more leniently than white supremacist speech and comparing students allegedly "blocked from going to campus just because they're Jewish" to the actions of the KKK, saying, "we have to be careful about setting any kind of double standard" when responding to far-right and pro-Palestinian demonstrators.

During the 2024 University of Pennsylvania pro-Palestine campus encampment, administrators sent Shapiro's office regular updates on the situation, including private negotiation documents between Penn and the demonstrators and the protesters' identities. In May 2024, Shapiro called for a police crackdown on the pro-Palestinian encampment at Penn, but he later said he was already aware of police plans to disband the encampment after police made arrests less than 24 hours after Shapiro's statement.

=== 2025 arson attack ===
In the early morning of April 13, 2025, an arsonist set fire to the Governor’s Residence. At the time of the incident, Shapiro, his family, and another family who had joined them the previous evening for a Passover Seder were inside the building. Everyone was safely evacuated, but the southern portion of the residence sustained significant damage. Later that day, Cody Allen Balmer, a 38-year-old former mechanic from Penbrook, Pennsylvania, was arrested and charged with terrorism, attempted murder, aggravated arson, and aggravated assault. Balmer said he would have beaten Shapiro with a hammer if he had encountered Shapiro.

== Presidential politics ==
=== 2024 presidential election ===
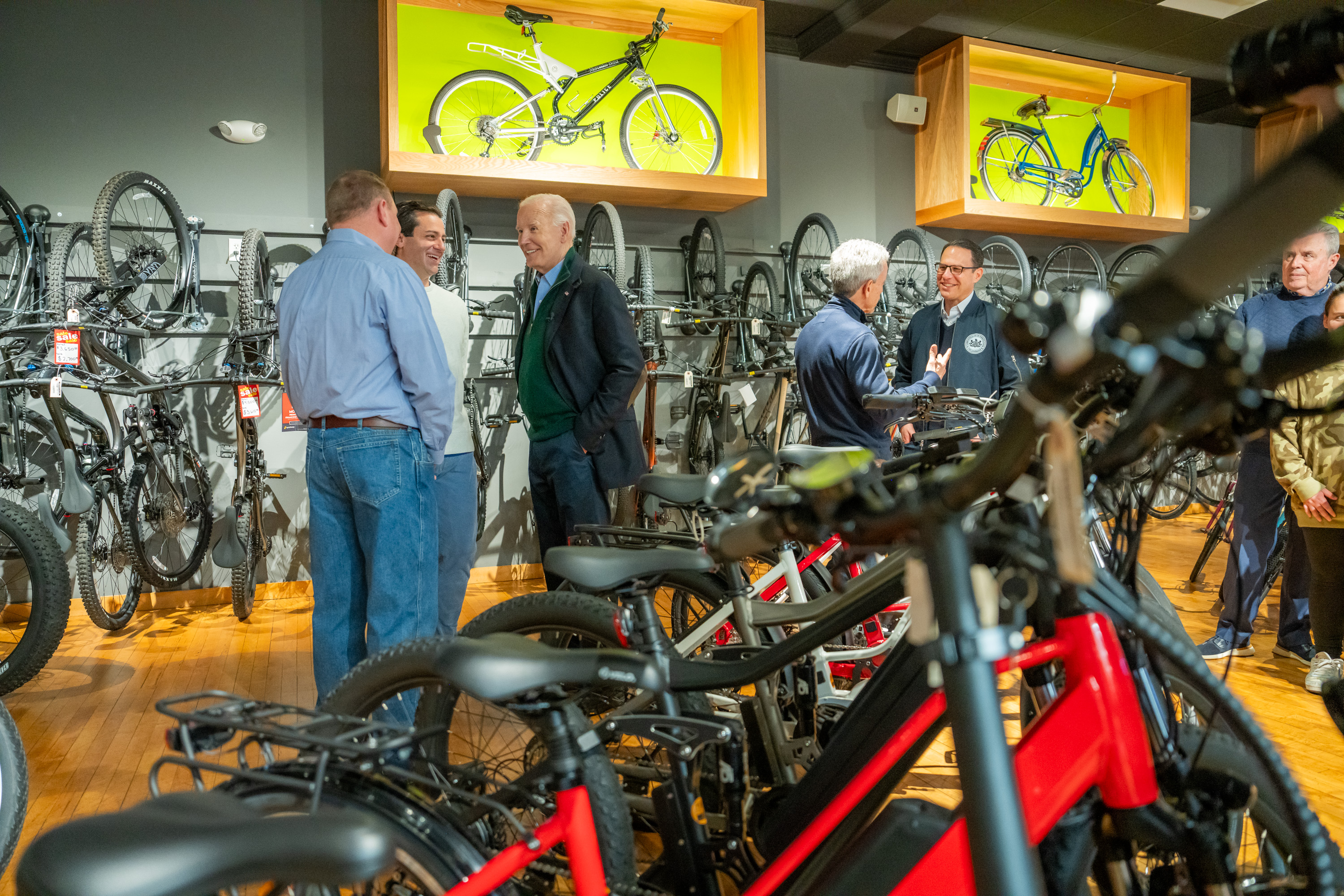
Shapiro and President Biden at a small business in Emmaus, Pennsylvania, January 2024

After Biden withdrew on July 21, Shapiro endorsed Vice President Kamala Harris, Biden's pick to replace him, and encouraged Democrats to unite in supporting Harris.

Shapiro was among the leading contenders to become Harris's running mate, and Harris interviewed him, Tim Walz, and Senator Mark Kelly on August 4, 2024, as part of the selection process. Harris chose Walz.

In her 2025 memoir 107 Days, Harris wrote that she "mused that [Shapiro] would want to be in the room for every decision" and told him that "a vice-president is not a co-president". In his 2026 book Where We Keep the Light, Shapiro wrote that Dana Remus of Harris's vetting team had asked whether he had been an "agent of the Israeli government" or communicated with an undercover Israeli agent, and that he felt the questions were offensive and was concerned about who was advising Harris. The vetting team argued that this was standard procedure and that Walz had also been questioned about whether he had ever been a foreign agent due to his trips to China.

=== 2028 presidential election ===
Shapiro has been seen as a potential candidate in the 2028 presidential election.

== Personal life ==
Shapiro met his wife, Lori, in ninth grade, when they both attended Akiba Hebrew Academy, now Jack M. Barrack Hebrew Academy, then in Merion Station. They dated in high school and reconnected after college while both were living in Washington, D.C. Shapiro proposed to her in Jerusalem in 1997. They married on May 25 of that year.

Shapiro and his wife have four children and reside in the Governor's Residence in Harrisburg, Pennsylvania. Shapiro is an observant Conservative Jew who keeps kosher.

Shapiro and his family observe Shabbat together on Friday nights, and his children attend a Jewish day school.

== Electoral history ==
2004 Pennsylvania House of Representatives election, District 153
Party	Candidate	Votes	%
Democratic	Josh Shapiro	18,237	54.32
Republican	Jon D. Fox	15,022	44.74
Libertarian	Matthew Wusinich	316	0.94
Total votes		33,575	100.00
Democratic gain from Republican			

2006 Pennsylvania House of Representatives election, District 153
Party	Candidate	Votes	%
Democratic	Josh Shapiro (incumbent)	19,712	75.97
Republican	Lou Guerra Jr.	6,226	24.00
Write-in		9	0.03
Total votes		25,947	100.00
Democratic hold			

2008 Pennsylvania House of Representatives election, District 153
Party	Candidate	Votes	%
Democratic	Josh Shapiro (incumbent)	Unopposed	
Total votes		33,165	100.00
Democratic hold			

2010 Pennsylvania House of Representatives election, District 153
Party	Candidate	Votes	%
Democratic	Josh Shapiro (incumbent)	17,430	70.10
Republican	Tom Bogar	7,426	29.87
Write-in		7	0.03
Total votes		24,863	100.00
Democratic hold			

2011 Montgomery County Board of Commissioners election
Party	Candidate	Votes	%
Democratic	Josh Shapiro	89,103	26.99
Democratic	Leslie Richards	87,109	26.39
Republican	Bruce Castor (incumbent)	77,732	23.55
Republican	Jenny Brown	76,057	23.04
Write-in		81	0.02
Total votes		330,082	100.00
Democratic gain from Republican			

2015 Montgomery County Board of Commissioners election
Party	Candidate	Votes	%
Democratic	Josh Shapiro (incumbent)	97,212	30.90
Democratic	Val Arkoosh (incumbent)	88,958	28.27
Republican	Joe Gale	65,740	20.90
Republican	Steven Tolbert Jr.	62,644	19.91
Write-in		64	0.02
Total votes		314,618	100.00
Democratic hold			

2016 Pennsylvania Attorney General election, Democratic primary
Party	Candidate	Votes	%
Democratic	Josh Shapiro	725,168	47.0
Democratic	Stephen Zappala	566,501	36.8
Democratic	John Morganelli	250,097	16.2
Total votes		1,541,766	100.0

2016 Pennsylvania Attorney General election
Party	Candidate	Votes	%	±%
Democratic	Josh Shapiro	3,057,010	51.39	−4.75
Republican	John Rafferty	2,891,325	48.61	+7.05
Total votes		5,948,335	100.0	N/A
Democratic hold				

2020 Pennsylvania Attorney General election
Party	Candidate	Votes	%	±%
Democratic	Josh Shapiro (incumbent)	3,461,472	50.85	−0.56
Republican	Heather Heidelbaugh	3,153,831	46.33	−2.28
Libertarian	Daniel Wassmer	120,489	1.77	N/A
Green	Richard L. Weiss	70,804	1.04	N/A
Total votes		6,806,596	100.0	
Democratic hold				

2022 Pennsylvania gubernatorial election, Democratic primary
Party	Candidate	Votes	%
Democratic	Josh Shapiro	Unopposed	
Total votes		1,226,107	100.0

2022 Pennsylvania gubernatorial election
Party	Candidate	Votes	%	±%
Democratic	Josh Shapiro; Austin Davis	3,031,137	56.49	−1.28
Republican	Doug Mastriano; Carrie DelRosso	2,238,477	41.71	+1.01
Libertarian	Matt Hackenburg; Tim McMaster	51,611	0.96	−0.02
Green	Christina DiGiulio; Michael Bagdes-Canning	24,436	0.46	−0.09
Keystone	Joe Soloski; Nicole Shultz	20,518	0.38	N/A
Total votes		5,366,179	100.0	N/A
Turnout			60.53	
Registered electors		8,864,831		
Democratic hold				

== Publications ==
=== Articles ===
- "We fixed I-95 in 12 days. Here are our lessons for U.S. infrastructure." The Washington Post, July 16, 2023
- "Finding Moral Clarity After an Arsonist’s Attack." The New York Times, April 23, 2025

=== Books ===
- Shapiro, Josh (2026). Where We Keep the Light: Stories from a Life of Service. HarperCollins. ISBN 978-0063463905.

Party political offices
Preceded by Kathleen Kane	Democratic nominee for Attorney General of Pennsylvania; 2016, 2020	Succeeded by Eugene DePasquale
Preceded by Tom Wolf	Democratic nominee for Governor of Pennsylvania; 2022, 2026	Most recent
Legal offices
Preceded by Bruce Beemer	Attorney General of Pennsylvania; 2017–2023	Succeeded by Michelle Henry
Political offices
Preceded by Tom Wolf	Governor of Pennsylvania; 2023–present	Incumbent
U.S. order of precedence (ceremonial)
Preceded by JD Vance as Vice President	Order of precedence of the United States; Within Pennsylvania	Succeeded by Mayor of city in which event is held
Preceded by JD Vance as Vice President	Order of precedence of the United States; Within Pennsylvania	Succeeded by Otherwise Mike Johnson as Speaker of the House
Preceded by Matt Meyer as Governor of Delaware	Order of precedence of the United States; Outside Pennsylvania	Succeeded by Mikie Sherrill as Governor of New Jersey
