= Nauvoo, Tioga County, Pennsylvania =

Unincorporated community in Pennsylvania, US

Nauvoo, Pennsylvania
- Unincorporated community
- Location within Pennsylvania
- Coordinates: 41°33′52″N 77°12′33″W
- Country: United States
- State: Pennsylvania
- County: Tioga
- Elevation: 1,467 ft (447 m)
- Time zone: UTC-5 (Eastern (EST))
  - Summer (DST): UTC-4 (EDT)
- Area code: 570
- GNIS feature ID: 1182186

Nauvoo is an unincorporated community in Tioga County, Pennsylvania, United States.

== History ==
Nauvoo was founded in 1844 by the Mormon Nauvoo on account of the Mormon elder D.W. Canfield, who resided there. During this time, Nauvoo consisted of two stores, a post-office, a saloon, a hotel, a church, a grist-mill, a saw-mill, a school-house, a blacksmith shop, a wagon shop, and 25 dwellings.

In 1840, Horace Fellows began manufacturing woolen goods and cloths. He eventually sold his machinery to Nauvoo.

The word Nauvoo is Hebrew and means beautiful, a place of rest and beauty.

== Geography ==
Nauvoo is on the line between the townships of Liberty and Morris.

== Special Features ==
There were four post-offices in the Nauvoo area in 1883.

== Notable person ==
- Kenneth B. Lee, Speaker of the Pennsylvania House of Representatives
