= Mike Vereb =

American politician

Michael A. Vereb Sr.
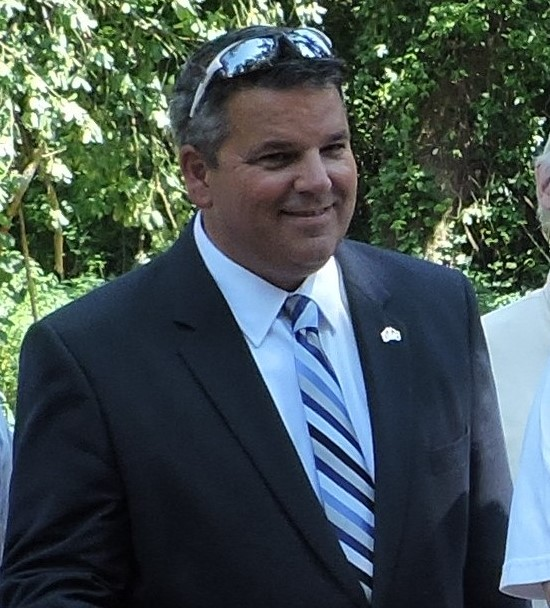
- Vereb in 2015

Member of the Pennsylvania House of Representatives from the 150th district
- In office January 2, 2007 – January 3, 2017
- Preceded by: Jacqueline Crahalla
- Succeeded by: Michael Corr

Personal details
- Born: October 6, 1966 (age 59)
- Party: Republican

Michael A. Vereb Sr. is an American politician who served in the Pennsylvania House of Representatives, representing the 150th legislative district from 2007 to 2017. He was first elected in 2006.

== Biography ==
Vereb graduated from the Montgomery County Police Academy in 1986 and worked for the West Consohohocken Police Department and in Corporate Security for Comcast and Day and Zimmerman. He served as president of the West Norriton Township Board of Commissioners prior to his election to the House of Representatives. On January 12, 2016, Vereb announced that he will not seek re-election in 2016 election.

In 2023, Vereb was named Secretary of Legislative Affairs for incoming Democratic Governor Josh Shapiro. He resigned in September 2023 following sexual harassment allegations made against him, after the governor's office paid US$295,000 to settle the complaint against Vereb.

== See also ==
- Michael Vereb, Canadian web and product designer.
