= Jacqueline Crahalla =

American politician

Member of the Pennsylvania House of Representatives from the 150th district
- In office January 7, 2003 – November 30, 2006
- Preceded by: John A. Lawless
- Succeeded by: Mike Vereb

Personal details
- Party: Republican
- Spouse: Benjamin R. Crahalla
- Education: Gwynedd Mercy College
- Occupation: Legislator (retired)

Jacqueline R. Crahalla is a former Republican member of the Pennsylvania House of Representatives, serving from 2003 to 2006.

== Biography ==
She is a 1958 graduate of Collingswood High School in Collingswood, New Jersey. She worked in Merck Sharp & Dohme and other corporations before retiring to "stay home and raise a family". During that time, she worked part-time as a columnist for a local newspaper. After 10 years, she returned to Merck and earned her degree in English and communications as a non-traditional student at Gwynedd Mercy College in 1993. She transferred to a new company, Astra Merck, which was a joint venture of between Merck and Astra, where Crahalla worked to create the Corporate Contributions department. After several corporate mergers, she chose to retire rather than relocate to Wilmington, Delaware. She served as township supervisor in Lower Providence Township, Pennsylvania for five years.

=== State legislature ===
In the 2002 election, Crahalla challenged incumbent Republican-turned-Democrat John A. Lawless in the newly re-drawn 150th legislative district. The new configuration was intentionally drawn to handicap Lawless as punishment from Lawless' former caucus. In September 2002, Lawless profanely berated a Lower Providence Township police officer, the That November, Crahalla defeated Lawless by razor thin 168 vote margin. Following the loss, Lawless destroyed many constituent-related documents, rather than surrender them to Crahalla.

In 2005, James T. Stewart, Crahalla's former chief of staff who was fired and indicted in Montgomery County for stealing $15,000 in campaign money, filed an ethics complaint against his former boss, telling the state State Ethics Commission and Judicial Conduct Board that he was "routinely required to perform political and campaign-related work" in Crahalla's district office. The complaint also alleged that Crahalla's husband, a magistrate judge violated judicial conduct rules by handling her campaign donations.

=== Retirement ===
In January 2006, Crahalla announced her retirement, effective following the 2006 election, stating that her decision was to "spend more time with family" and that it had nothing to do with Stewart's accusations.
