= Val Arkoosh =

American physician, academic, and politician

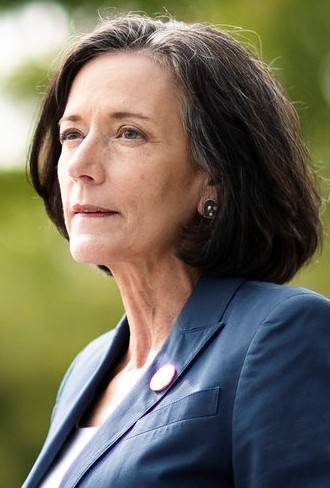
- Arkoosh in 2020

Secretary of the Pennsylvania Department of Human Services
- Incumbent
- Assumed office January 17, 2023; Acting until June 29, 2023
- Governor: Josh Shapiro
- Preceded by: Meg Snead (acting)

Chair of the Montgomery County Board of Commissioners
- In office November 2016 – January 17, 2023
- Preceded by: Josh Shapiro
- Succeeded by: Kenneth E. Lawrence, Jr.

Member of the Montgomery County Board of Commissioners
- In office January 2015 – January 17, 2023
- Preceded by: Leslie Richards
- Succeeded by: Jamila H. Winder

Personal details
- Born: c. 1961
- Party: Democratic
- Spouse: Jeffrey Harbison
- Children: 3
- Education: Northwestern University; University of Nebraska College of Medicine (M.D.); Johns Hopkins Bloomberg School of Public Health (MPH)

Valerie A. Arkoosh (c. 1961) is an American anesthesiologist and politician. A member of the Democratic Party, she has served as secretary of the Pennsylvania Department of Human Services under Governor Josh Shapiro since 2023. From 2016 to 2023, Arkoosh was chair of the Montgomery County Board of Commissioners, where she served alongside Shapiro during his tenure on the board.

Arkoosh formerly served on the board of health of Montgomery County. Arkoosh unsuccessfully ran to represent Pennsylvania's 13th congressional district in 2014 and for the United States Senate in 2022.

== Education and medical career ==
Arkoosh earned a bachelor's degree in economics from Northwestern University in 1982 and a doctorate from University of Nebraska College of Medicine in 1986. She earned her Master of Public Health from Johns Hopkins Bloomberg School of Public Health in 2007.

She was a professor of clinical anesthesiology and clinical obstetrics and gynecology at the Perelman School of Medicine of the University of Pennsylvania and previously taught at Thomas Jefferson University Sidney Kimmel Medical College and Drexel University College of Medicine, where she chaired the school's anesthesiology department from 1999 to 2004. In 2007, Arkoosh joined the board of the National Physicians Alliance (NPA). From 2010 to 2012, she was president of the NPA as it supported the passage of the Affordable Care Act and healthcare as a human right. Arkoosh also chaired the Board of Health of Montgomery County, Pennsylvania from 2011 to 2014.

== Political career ==
Arkoosh ran for Congress in 2014 for Pennsylvania's 13th congressional district when Congresswoman Allyson Schwartz vacated the seat to run for governor. She came in fourth place in the Democratic primary, losing to eventual winner Brendan Boyle.

=== Montgomery County commissioner ===
In January 2015, was appointed to a vacated seat on the Montgomery County Board of Commissioners. She was elected to a full term the following November. That year she signed a "standing order" allowing pharmacies in the county to dispense naloxone upon request. During her time on the Board of Commissioners, she served alongside future Attorney General and Governor Josh Shapiro.

Arkoosh served as vice chair of the board until November 2016 when she was made chair. In January 2019, she was among a number of Pennsylvania legislators and county officials who went on a trip to Israel designed to educate state officials on security issues in the Middle East. She was given a second term as chair in 2020 after being reelected in 2019. As chair, Arkoosh instituted a fifteen dollars per hour minimum wage and paid parental leave for county employees.

=== 2022 U.S. Senate campaign ===
On April 5, 2021, Arkoosh launched her campaign for the Democratic nomination for the 2022 United States Senate election in Pennsylvania following the retirement of Pat Toomey. She received the endorsement of EMILY's List. Arkoosh dropped out of the race in February 2022 after receiving just 17 votes of support out of the 290 Pennsylvania Democratic Committeemen.

=== Secretary of Pennsylvania Department of Human Services ===
In January 2023, Arkoosh was nominated by governor-elect Josh Shapiro to serve as secretary of the Pennsylvania Department of Human Services. She automatically became full secretary on June 29 after the Pennsylvania State Senate failed to act within the constitutionally prescribed 25-legislative-day period to confirm her nomination. In the first year of her leadership, Arkoosh directed the department to eliminate a two-year Medicaid enrollment backlog and increased the coverage for doulas and medicine for homeless people.

== Personal life ==
Arkoosh lives in Springfield Township, Montgomery County, Pennsylvania, with her husband, Jeffrey Harbison, and their three children. She was diagnosed with COVID-19 in January 2022, and reported mild symptoms.

== Electoral history ==
2014 United States House of Representatives Democratic primary election, PA-13
Party	Candidate	Votes	%
Democratic	Brendan Boyle	24,775	40.61
Democratic	Marjorie Margolies	16,723	27.41
Democratic	Daylin Leach	10,130	16.60
Democratic	Val Arkoosh	9,386	15.38
Total votes		61,014	100.00

2015 Montgomery County Board of Commissioners Democratic primary election
Party	Candidate	Votes	%
Democratic	Josh Shapiro (incumbent)	30,645	54.12
Democratic	Val Arkoosh (incumbent)	25,864	45.68
Write-in		111	0.20
Total votes		56,620	100.00

2015 Montgomery County Board of Commissioners election
Party	Candidate	Votes	%
Democratic	Josh Shapiro (incumbent)	97,212	30.90
Democratic	Val Arkoosh (incumbent)	88,958	28.27
Republican	Joe Gale	65,740	20.90
Republican	Steven Tolbert Jr.	62,644	19.91
Write-in		64	0.02
Total votes		314,618	100.00

2019 Montgomery County Board of Commissioners Democratic primary election
Party	Candidate	Votes	%
Democratic	Val Arkoosh (incumbent)	48,599	46.09
Democratic	Kenneth E. Lawrence, Jr. (incumbent)	46,998	44.58
Democratic	Ray Sosa	9,836	9.33
Total votes		105,393	100.00

2019 Montgomery County Board of Commissioners election
Party	Candidate	Votes	%
Democratic	Val Arkoosh (incumbent)	127,089	32.29
Democratic	Kenneth E. Lawrence, Jr. (incumbent)	124,247	31.57
Republican	Joe Gale (incumbent)	74,023	18.81
Republican	Fred Conner	68,176	17.32
Total votes		393,535	100.00
