= Lee Donaldson =

American politician

Lee A. Donaldson, Jr.

Republican Leader of the Pennsylvania House of Representatives

Member of the Pennsylvania House of Representatives
- In office January 2, 1967 – November 30, 1970
- Preceded by: Kenneth Lee
- Succeeded by: Kenneth Lee

Member of the Pennsylvania House of Representatives from the 30th district
- In office January 7, 1969 – November 30, 1970
- Preceded by: District Created
- Succeeded by: Rick Cessar

Member of the Pennsylvania House of Representatives from the Allegheny County district
- In office 1955–1968

Personal details
- Born: August 11, 1925 Etna, Pennsylvania
- Died: September 3, 2009 (aged 84) Baltic Sea
- Party: Republican

Lee A. Donaldson, Jr. (August 11, 1925 – September 3, 2009) was a former Republican member of the Pennsylvania House of Representatives.

He died aboard a cruise ship departing St. Petersburg, Russia to Helsinki, Finland of a heart attack in 2009.
