= Pennsylvania House of Representatives, District 150 =

American legislative district

Pennsylvania's 150th State House of Representatives district
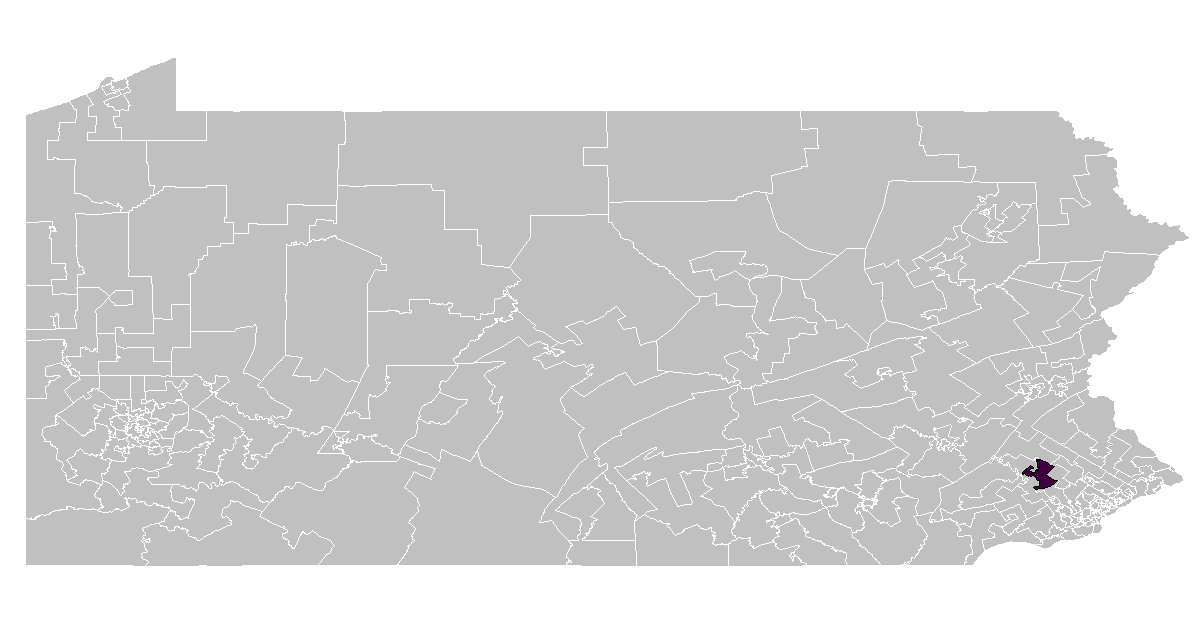
Representative
Joe Webster; D–Lower Providence Township

The 150th Pennsylvania House of Representatives District is located in Montgomery County and includes the following areas:

- Collegeville
- Lower Providence Township
- Skippack Township
- Upper Providence Township
- West Norriton Township (PART)
  - District 01
  - District 02 [PART, Division 01]
  - District 03

== Representatives ==
Representative	Party	Years	District home	Note
Prior to 1969, seats were apportioned by county.
Robert J. Butera	Republican	1969 – 1977		Resigned December 14, 1977
Joseph A. Lashinger, Jr.	Republican	1978 – 1990		Elected to fill vacancy
John A. Lawless	Republican	1991 – 2000	Audubon	Switched party in 2001
John A. Lawless	Democrat	2001 – 2002	Audubon	
Jacqueline R. Crahalla	Republican	2003 – 2006		
Mike Vereb	Republican	2007 – 2017	West Norriton Township	
Michael Corr	Republican	2017 – 2019	Collegeville	
Joe Webster	Democrat	2019 – present	Lower Providence Township	Incumbent
