= Michael Corr =

American politician

Member of the Pennsylvania House of Representatives from the 150th district
- In office January 3, 2017 – January 1, 2019
- Preceded by: Mike Vereb
- Succeeded by: Joe Webster

Personal details
- Born: September 15, 1965 (age 60) Montgomery County, Pennsylvania
- Party: Republican

Michael Corr (born September 15, 1965) is an American politician who served in the Pennsylvania House of Representatives from the 150th district from 2017 to 2019.

On May 30, 2018, he announced he wouldn't run for reelection to a second term.
