= Joe Webster (politician) =

American politician (born 1958)

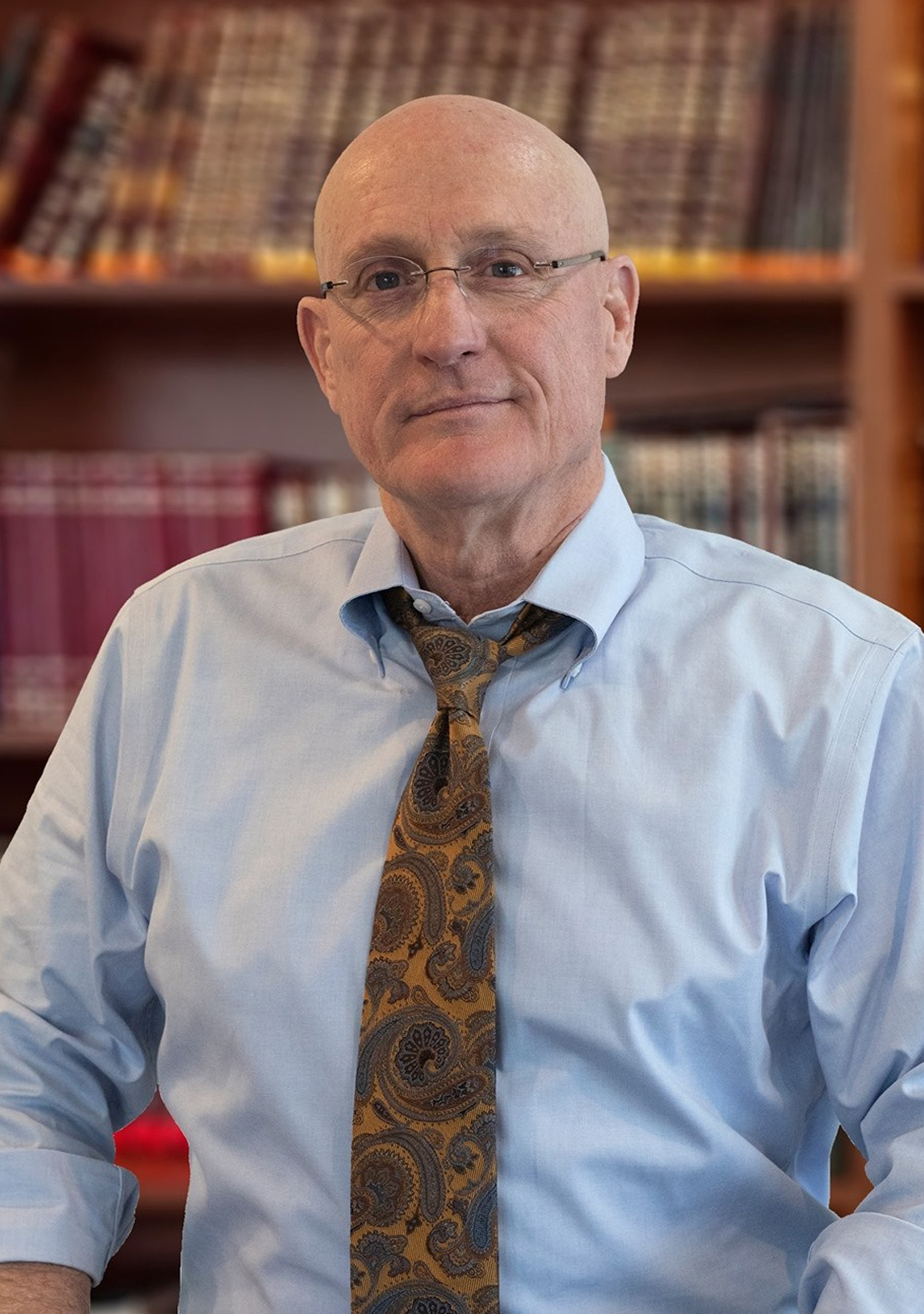

Member of the Pennsylvania House of Representatives from the 150th district
- Incumbent
- Assumed office January 1, 2019
- Preceded by: Michael Corr

Personal details
- Born: Joseph Gerald Webster; March 23, 1958 (age 68) Norristown, Pennsylvania, U.S.
- Party: Democratic
- Spouse: Laura Winslow
- Children: 3
- Education: United States Air Force Academy (BS); Wright State (MA); Naval War College (MA); George Washington University (PhD)

Joseph Gerald Webster (born March 23, 1958) is a Democratic member of the Pennsylvania House of Representatives, representing the 150th District.

== Education and Military career ==
Webster graduated from La Salle College High School in 1976. He then graduated from the United States Air Force Academy in 1980 with a degree in Engineering and Humanities. Webster would later receive Master of Arts degrees from Wright State in English in 1984 and Naval War College in National Security Policy Studies in 2001 and a PhD from George Washington University in Public Policy in 2004. He went on to serve as an officer in the United States Air Force for 31 years, including 20 years at the Pentagon working on special projects and eventually serving as the legislative liaison between the Air Force and Congress, eventually retiring at the rank of Colonel.

== Political career ==
In 2018 Webster ran to replace retiring Republican Michael Corr. He won the general election with 56% of the vote, beating Republican Nick Fountain.

Webster currently sits on the Appropriations, Finance, State Government, and Veterans Affairs & Emergency Preparedness committees.
