= 2020 Pennsylvania Attorney General election =

- November 3, 2020
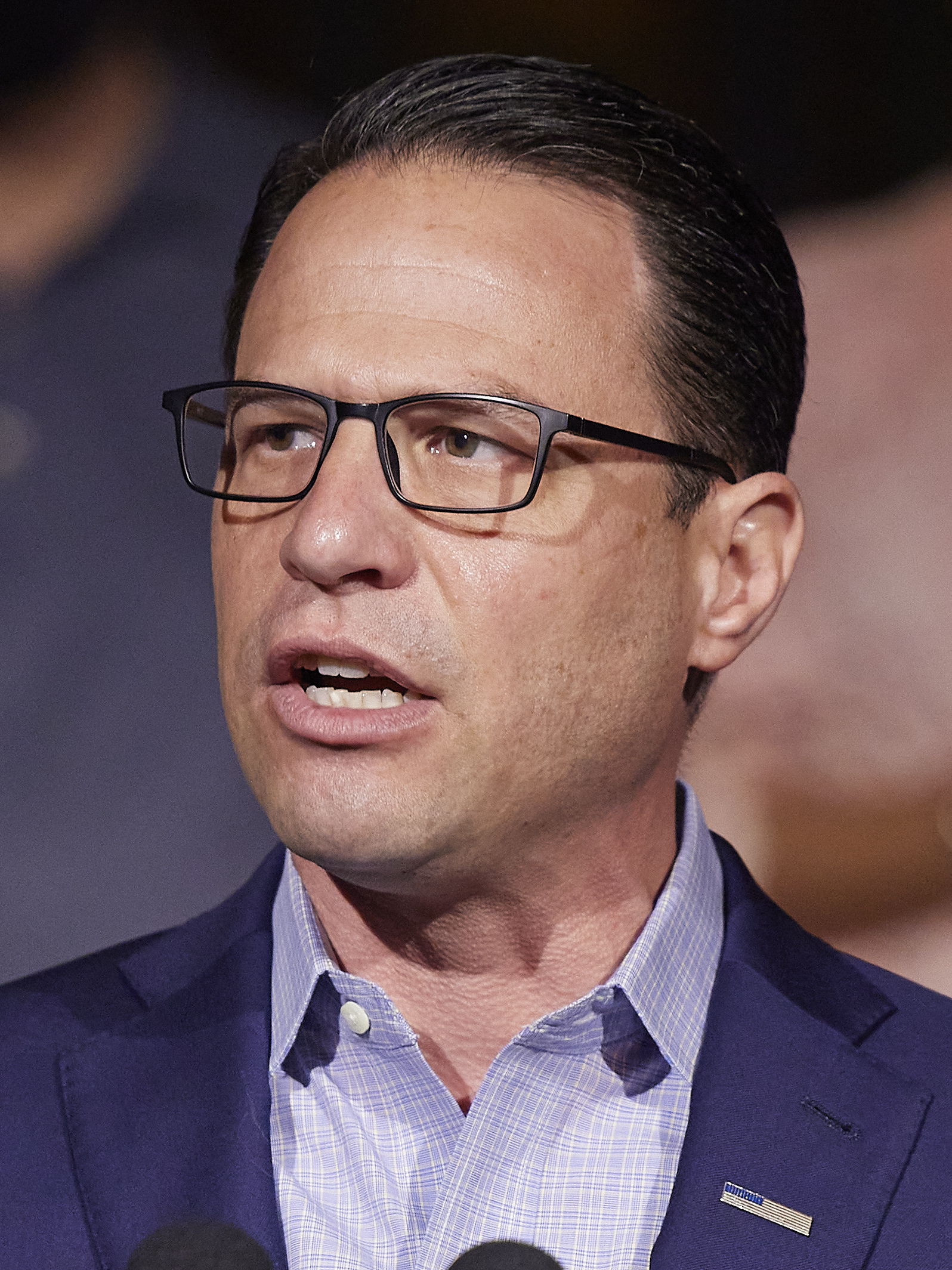

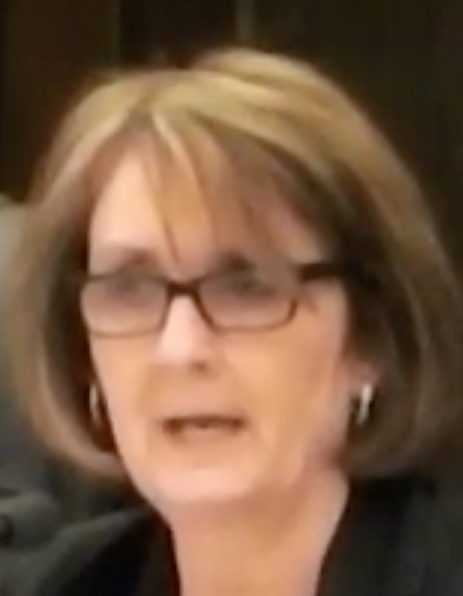
Nominee	Josh Shapiro	Heather Heidelbaugh
Party	Democratic	Republican
Popular vote	3,461,472	3,153,831
Percentage	50.85%	46.33%
- Shapiro: 40–50% 50–60% 60–70% 70–80% 80–90% >90% Heidelbaugh: 40–50% 50–60% 60–70% 70–80% 80–90% >90% Tie: 40–50% No data
Attorney General before election
Josh Shapiro
Democratic
Elected Attorney General
Josh Shapiro
Democratic

The 2020 Pennsylvania attorney general election was held on November 3, 2020, to elect the attorney general of Pennsylvania. Democratic incumbent Josh Shapiro won re-election to a second term, defeating Republican nominee Heather Heidelbaugh. Primary elections were originally due to take place on April 28, 2020. Following concerns regarding the COVID-19 pandemic in the United States including Pennsylvania, the primaries were delayed until June 2, 2020.

== Democratic primary ==
=== Candidates ===
==== Nominee ====
- Josh Shapiro, incumbent attorney general

=== Results ===
Democratic primary results
Party	Candidate	Votes	%
Democratic	Josh Shapiro (incumbent)	Unopposed	
Total votes		1,429,414	100.0%

== Republican primary ==
=== Candidates ===
==== Nominee ====
- Heather Heidelbaugh, partner, Leech Tishman; former Allegheny County councilwoman (2012–2016)

=== Results ===
Republican primary results
Party	Candidate	Votes	%
Republican	Heather Heidelbaugh	Unopposed	
Total votes		1,055,168	100.0%

== General election ==
=== Predictions ===
Source	Ranking	As of
The Cook Political Report	Likely D	July 17, 2020

=== Polling ===
Poll source	Date(s) administered	Sample size (Note: Key: A – all adults RV – registered voters LV – likely voters V – unclear)	Margin of error	Josh Shapiro (D)	Heather Heidelbaugh (R)	Other	Undecided
Civiqs/Daily Kos	October 23–26, 2020	1,145 (LV)	± %	52%	41%	5% (Note: Wessmer (L) with 3%; Weiss (G) with 2%)	3%
Monmouth University	September 28 – October 4, 2020	500 (RV)	± 4.4%	53%	38%	1% (Note: "No one" with 1%; Wassmer (L) and Weiss (G) with 0%)	7%
Monmouth University	September 28 – October 4, 2020	500 (LV)	± 4.4%	54% (Note: With a likely voter turnout model featuring high turnout)	39%	–	–
Monmouth University	September 28 – October 4, 2020	500 (LV)	± 4.4%	53% (Note: With a likely voter turnout model featuring low turnout)	40%	–	–
Trafalgar Group (R) (Note: The American Industry Project has exclusively supported Republican candidates)	September 23, 2020	1,023 (LV)	± 2.98%	47%	43%	5% (Note: Wassmer (L) and Weiss (G) with 2%; "Someone else" with 1%)	5%
CPEC	September 15–17, 2020	830 (LV)	± 2.3%	41%	21%	1%	37%
Monmouth University	August 28–31, 2020	400 (RV)	± 4.9%	51%	41%	2% (Note: "No one" and Wassmer (L) with 1%; Weiss (G) with 0%)	7%
Monmouth University	August 28–31, 2020	400 (LV)	± 4.9%	52% (Note: With a likely voter turnout model featuring higher turnout than in the 2016 presidential election)	41%	1%	6%
Monmouth University	August 28–31, 2020	400 (LV)	± 4.9%	51% (Note: With a likely voter turnout model featuring lower turnout than in the 2016 presidential election)	42%	1%	6%

=== Endorsements ===
Josh Shapiro

Executive branch officials

- Barack Obama, former president of the United States (2009–2017)

U.S. senators

- Bob Casey Jr., Pennsylvania (2007–2025)

Local officials

- Pete Buttigieg, former mayor of South Bend, Indiana, and 2020 presidential candidate

Labor unions

- Allegheny-Fayette Central Labor Council

Organizations

- Brady Campaign
- Human Rights Campaign
- Mom's Demand Action
- NARAL
- Pennsylvania Democratic Party

Individuals

- Fred Guttenberg, activist

Newspapers and other media

- The Philadelphia Tribune
- The Philadelphia Inquirer

=== Results ===
Pennsylvania Attorney General election, 2020
Party	Candidate	Votes	%	±%
Democratic	Josh Shapiro (incumbent)	3,461,472	50.85%	−0.56%
Republican	Heather Heidelbaugh	3,153,831	46.33%	−2.28%
Libertarian	Daniel Wassmer	120,489	1.77%	N/A
Green	Richard L. Weiss	70,804	1.04%	N/A
Total votes		6,806,596	100.0%	
Democratic hold				

==== By county ====
County	Heather Hiedelbaugh Republican		Josh Shapiro Democratic		Various candidates Other parties	
County	#	%	#	%	#	%
Adams	36,476	65.27%	17,707	31.69%	1,701	3.05%
Allegheny	246,537	34.58%	443,523	62.21%	22,855	3.21%
Armstrong	24,569	68.07%	10,673	29.57%	851	2.33%
Beaver	47,316	50.62%	43,446	46.48%	2,714	2.90%
Bedford	22,088	80.98%	4,743	17.39%	446	1.63%
Berks	103,359	50.95%	92,774	45.73%	6,725	3.31%
Blair	43,933	69.58%	17,511	27.73%	1,694	2.69%
Bradford	20,632	69.79%	8,000	27.06%	931	3.15%
Bucks	181,596	46.32%	200,335	51.10%	10,142	2.59%
Butler	68,477	61.06%	40,708	36.30%	2,959	2.63%
Cambria	43,046	61.49%	25,441	36.34%	1,520	2.17%
Cameron	1,678	69.57%	673	27.90%	61	2.53%
Carbon	19,932	60.17%	12,267	37.03%	927	2.80%
Centre	36,006	46.88%	38,198	49.74%	2,598	3.39%
Chester	134,649	43.10%	169,452	54.24%	8,335	2.67%
Clarion	13,324	68.93%	5,561	28.77%	445	2.30%
Clearfield	27,318	70.02%	10,751	27.56%	943	2.42%
Clinton	10,950	62.68%	6,075	34.77%	446	2.55%
Columbia	18,010	58.56%	11,705	38.06%	1,041	3.38%
Crawford	26,766	64.70%	13,344	32.25%	1,261	3.05%
Cumberland	76,012	54.19%	60,141	42.87%	4,126	2.94%
Dauphin	62,622	42.94%	78,651	53.94%	4,550	3.12%
Delaware	120,232	37.16%	196,128	60.62%	7,184	2.22%
Elk	11,353	67.79%	4,997	29.84%	398	2.38%
Erie	59,664	44.54%	69,548	51.91%	4,757	3.55%
Fayette	35,364	58.02%	24,377	40.00%	1,207	1.98%
Forest	1,695	64.74%	859	32.81%	64	2.44%
Franklin	55,408	69.68%	21,874	27.51%	2,239	2.82%
Fulton	6,563	83.88%	1,109	14.17%	152	1.94%
Greene	10,563	61.18%	6,227	36.07%	475	2.75%
Huntingdon	16,455	73.09%	5,559	24.69%	500	2.22%
Indiana	24,809	60.76%	15,013	36.77%	1,006	2.47%
Jefferson	17,002	74.44%	5,290	23.16%	547	2.39%
Juniata	8,950	75.36%	2,648	22.30%	279	2.35%
Lackawanna	43,289	38.28%	66,748	59.03%	3,037	2.69%
Lancaster	159,165	57.56%	109,568	39.62%	7,808	2.83%
Lawrence	25,399	56.08%	18,735	41.36%	1,149	2.56%
Lebanon	44,716	63.34%	23,756	33.65%	2,122	3.01%
Lehigh	79,664	43.91%	96,029	52.93%	5,719	3.15%
Luzerne	73,051	48.60%	73,325	48.79%	3,921	2.61%
Lycoming	39,148	66.48%	18,048	30.65%	1,690	2.87%
McKean	13,635	71.18%	4,972	25.96%	548	2.87%
Mercer	33,973	59.53%	21,512	37.70%	1,580	2.76%
Mifflin	15,846	74.73%	4,866	22.95%	492	2.32%
Monroe	35,501	43.62%	43,230	53.12%	2,651	3.26%
Montgomery	178,554	35.35%	313,151	62.00%	13,381	2.65%
Montour	5,424	55.99%	3,943	40.70%	321	3.31%
Northampton	78,082	47.09%	82,853	49.97%	4,864	2.93%
Northumberland	26,353	63.13%	14,036	33.62%	1,354	3.24%
Perry	17,483	71.49%	6,234	25.49%	739	3.02%
Philadelphia	117,140	16.53%	572,158	80.72%	19,537	2.75%
Pike	18,578	57.83%	12,503	38.92%	1,045	3.25%
Potter	7,055	79.00%	1,667	18.67%	208	2.33%
Schuylkill	43,511	62.32%	24,048	34.44%	2,261	3.24%
Snyder	13,119	69.55%	5,261	27.89%	482	25.5%
Somerset	29,488	73.23%	9,934	24.67%	845	2.10%
Sullivan	2,380	67.10%	1,072	30.22%	95	2.68%
Susquehanna	14,389	67.00%	6,479	30.17%	608	2.83%
Tioga	15,345	73.94%	4,741	22.84%	668	3.20%
Union	11,715	58.89%	7,619	38.30%	560	2.82%
Venango	16,862	64.27%	8,631	32.90%	744	2.83%
Warren	13,425	66.52%	6,044	29.95%	714	3.53%
Washington	63,881	54.37%	50,617	43.08%	2,990	2.54%
Wayne	17,302	62.64%	9,632	34.87%	687	2.49%
Westmoreland	115,208	56.60%	83,550	41.05%	4,799	2.36%
Wyoming	9,159	62.48%	5,080	34.65%	421	2.87%
York	142,637	60.46%	86,122	36.50%	7,164	3.04%
Totals	3,153,831	46.33%	3,461,472	50.85%	191,293	2.81%

Counties that flipped from Republican to Democratic

- Luzerne (largest city: Wilkes-Barre)

==== By congressional district ====
Shapiro won ten of 18 congressional districts, including one that elected a Republican.

District	Shapiro	Heidelbaugh	Representative
1st	52%	46%	Brian Fitzpatrick
2nd	71%	26%	Brendan Boyle
3rd	89%	8%	Dwight Evans
4th	61%	36%	Madeleine Dean
5th	63%	35%	Mary Gay Scanlon
6th	54%	43%	Chrissy Houlahan
7th	52%	45%	Susan Wild
8th	52%	46%	Matt Cartwright
9th	37%	60%	Dan Meuser
10th	47%	50%	Scott Perry
11th	37%	60%	Lloyd Smucker
12th	32%	65%	Fred Keller
13th	28%	69%	John Joyce
14th	42%	56%	Guy Reschenthaler
15th	31%	66%	Glenn Thompson
16th	43%	54%	Mike Kelly
17th	54%	43%	Conor Lamb
18th	67%	30%	Mike Doyle

== See also ==
- 2020 Pennsylvania elections

== Notes ==
Partisan clients
