= Kenneth B. Lee =

American politician

77th Speaker of the Pennsylvania House of Representatives

Member of the Pennsylvania House of Representatives
- In office January 2, 1967 – January 7, 1969
- Preceded by: Robert Hamilton
- Succeeded by: Herbert Fineman

Member of the Pennsylvania House of Representatives
- In office January 2, 1973 – January 7, 1975
- Preceded by: Herbert Fineman
- Succeeded by: Herbert Fineman

Republican Leader of the Pennsylvania House of Representatives
- In office January 5, 1971 – November 30, 1972
- Preceded by: Lee Donaldson
- Succeeded by: Robert Butera
- In office April 1, 1963 – November 30, 1966
- Preceded by: Albert Johnson
- Succeeded by: Lee Donaldson

Member of the Pennsylvania House of Representatives from the 111th district
- In office January 7, 1969 – November 30, 1974
- Preceded by: District Created
- Succeeded by: Carmel Sirianni

Member of the Pennsylvania House of Representatives from the Sullivan County district
- In office January 1, 1957 – November 30, 1968

District Attorney of Sullivan County
- In office 1953–1957

Personal details
- Born: January 23, 1922 Nauvoo, Pennsylvania
- Died: December 23, 2010 (aged 88) Williamsport, Pennsylvania
- Party: Republican
- Spouse: Marjorie Cole Lee
- Education: Mansfield State College; Dickinson School of Law

Kenneth B. "Ken" Lee (January 23, 1922 – December 23, 2010) was an American politician who served as Speaker of the Pennsylvania House of Representatives.

Lee was first elected to the Pennsylvania House of Representatives in 1957. Prior to being elected to the Pennsylvania House of Representatives, Lee was in his third year as District Attorney of Sullivan County, Pennsylvania.

Lee was born in Tioga County, Pennsylvania. He was a United States Air Force pilot stationed in Italy during World War II. He graduated from Mansfield University of Pennsylvania and Dickinson School of Law.

Lee was the running mate of Republican gubernatorial candidate Drew Lewis in the 1974 election, competing against the Democratic incumbents Gov. Milton J. Shapp & Lt. Gov. Ernest P. Kline and the Constitutional candidates Stephen Depue & Ellis L. Werft.

== See also ==
- List of Pennsylvania state legislatures

Political offices
Preceded by Herbert Fineman	Speaker of the Pennsylvania House of Representatives; 1973–1974	Succeeded by Herbert Fineman
Preceded by Robert Hamilton	Speaker of the Pennsylvania House of Representatives; 1967–1968	Succeeded by Herbert Fineman
Pennsylvania House of Representatives
Preceded by District Created	Member of the Pennsylvania House of Representatives for the 111th District; 1969–1974; Held county-wide seat from 1957–1968	Succeeded by Carmel Sirianni
Party political offices
Preceded by Ralph Scalera	Republican nominee for Lieutenant Governor of Pennsylvania; 1974	Succeeded by William Scranton, III
Preceded by Lee Donaldson	Republican Leader of the Pennsylvania House of Representatives; 1971–1972	Succeeded by Robert Butera
Preceded by Albert Johnson	Republican Leader of the Pennsylvania House of Representatives; 1963–1966	Succeeded by Lee Donaldson
