= Robert Butera =

American politician

Robert J. Butera

Republican Leader of the Pennsylvania House of Representatives
- In office January 2, 1973 – December 14, 1977
- Preceded by: Kenneth Lee
- Succeeded by: Jack Seltzer

Member of the Pennsylvania House of Representatives from the 150th district
- In office January 7, 1969 – December 14, 1977
- Preceded by: District created
- Succeeded by: Joseph Lashinger

Member of the Pennsylvania House of Representatives from the Montgomery County district
- In office January 1, 1963 – November 30, 1968

Personal details
- Born: January 21, 1935 (age 91) Norristown, Pennsylvania
- Party: Republican

Robert J. Butera (born January 21, 1935) is a former Republican member of the Pennsylvania House of Representatives.
