= Carmel Sirianni =

American politician

Member of the Pennsylvania House of Representatives from the 111th district
- In office 1975–1990
- Preceded by: Kenneth B. Lee
- Succeeded by: Kenneth E. Lee

Personal details
- Born: September 14, 1922 Old Forge, Lackawanna County, Pennsylvania
- Died: April 22, 1991 (aged 68) Montrose, Pennsylvania
- Party: Republican
- Occupation: Politician

Carmel Sirianni (September 14, 1922 – April 22, 1991) was an American politician who was elected to the Pennsylvania House of Representatives in 1974.

== Formative years ==
Born in Old Forge, Lackawanna County, Pennsylvania, on September 14, 1922, Sirianni was a daughter of John and Amelia (Pascoe) Sirianni. She earned a bachelor's degree from Bloomsburg University and a master's degree in education and guidance from Bucknell University.

== Political career ==
Prior to her own election to the Pennsylvania House of Representatives in 1974, Sirianni was employed in public education for twenty-three years, as a teacher, assistant principal and guidance counselor in the Hop Bottom and Mountain View School Districts, before working as an administrative assistant to Pennsylvania Speaker of the House Kenneth B. Lee for seven years. She was also chair of the Susquehanna County Republican Committee.

She served as a Republican member of the Pennsylvania House of Representatives from 1975 to 1989, representing its 111th District.

In January 1975, she was named to the House Local Government Committee. That year, she authored or co-authored several pieces of legislation, including House Bill 288, which would have increased the reimbursement for road maintenance on state-owned land to four cents per acre; House Bill 923, which would have prohibited the construction of energy parks without first receiving approval from local authorities in the communities for which they were being proposed; and House Bill 1584, which would have slowed the closure process of unapproved landfill sites by the Pennsylvania Department of Environmental Resources.

In January 1976, she announced that she would seek a second term. In October of that year, representatives of the Pennsylvania Farm Journal rated her two-year voting record on farm-related legislation at one hundred percent. She was also endorsed in her bid for a second term by the Political Action Committee for Education and Pennsylvanians for Effective Government.

== Illness, death and interment ==
Sirianni underwent back surgery in mid-April 1991. She then suffered a heart attack, and died at her home in Montrose, Pennsylvania on April 22. She was sixty-eight years old at the time of her death.

A funeral mass was held at St. Patrick's Catholic Church in Nicholson on Wednesday, April 24, 1991. She was then interred at the Cathedral Cemetery in Scranton.
