= Oregon Township, Pennsylvania =

Township in Pennsylvania, US

Oregon Township
- Township
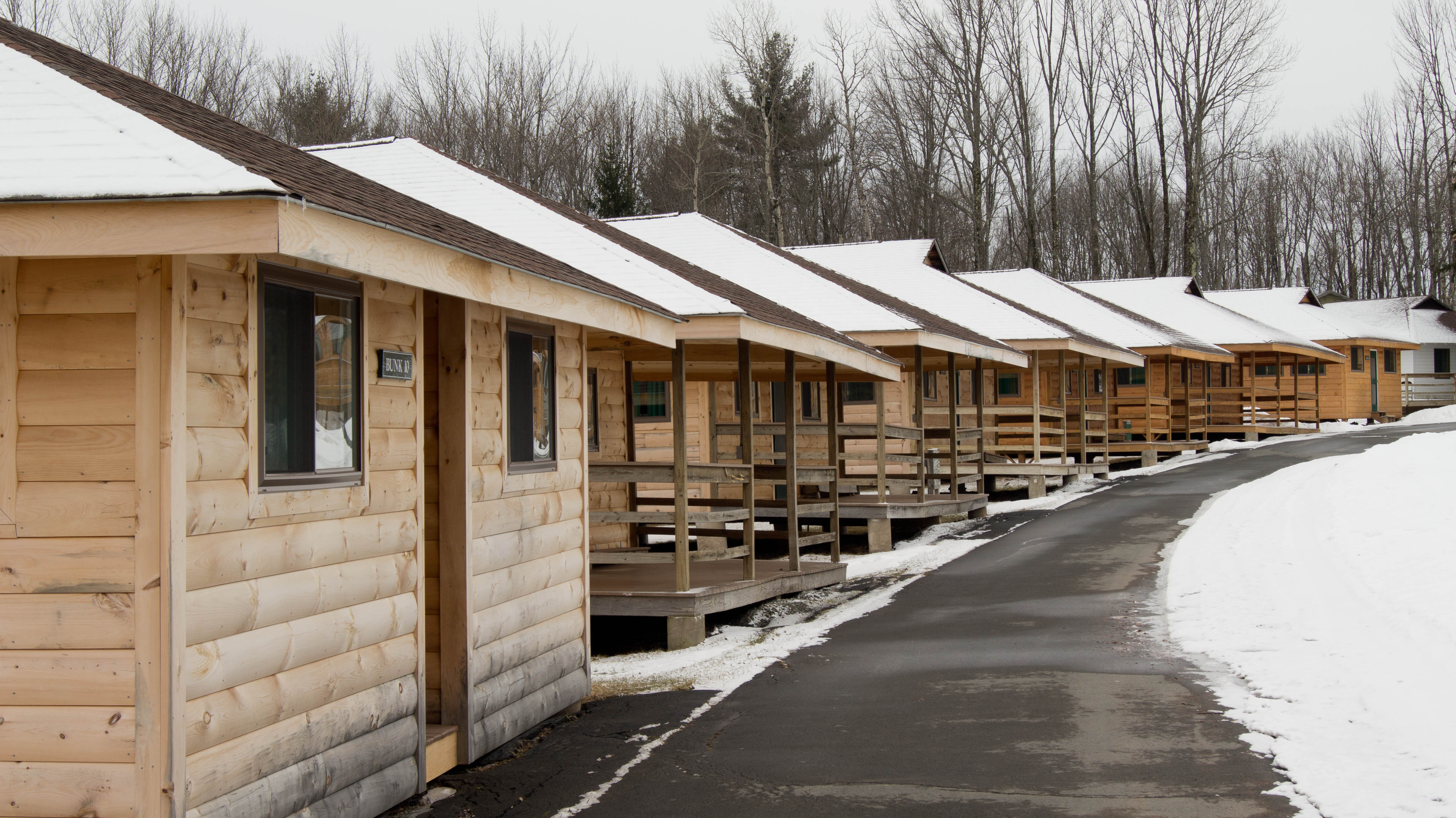
- Bryn Mawr Mountain Retreat and Conference Center

- Location in Wayne County and the state of Pennsylvania.

- Location of Pennsylvania in the United States
- Coordinates: 41°37′00″N 75°12′59″W
- Country: United States
- State: Pennsylvania
- County: Wayne

Area
  - Total: 17.97 sq mi (46.55 km^{2})
  - Land: 17.70 sq mi (45.85 km^{2})
  - Water: 0.27 sq mi (0.70 km^{2})
- Elevation: 1,378 ft (420 m)

Population (2010)
  - Total: 781
  - Estimate (2016): 748
  - Density: 42.3/sq mi (16.32/km^{2})
- Time zone: UTC-5 (EST)
  - Summer (DST): UTC-4 (EDT)
- ZIP code: 18431
- Area code: 570
- FIPS code: 42-127-57000

Oregon is a second-class township in Wayne County, Pennsylvania, United States. The township's population was 781 at the time of the 2010 United States Census.

== Geography ==
According to the United States Census Bureau, the township has a total area of 18.0 square miles (46.6 km^{2}), of which 17.7 square miles (46 km^{2}) is land and 0.3 square mile (1 km^{2}) (1.67%) is water.

== Demographics ==
Historical population
Census	Pop.	Note	%±
2010	781		—
2016 (est.)	748		−4.2%
U.S. Decennial Census

As of the census of 2010, there were 781 people, 314 households, and 237 families residing in the township. The population density was 44.1 people per square mile (17/km^{2}). There were 382 housing units at an average density of 21.6/sq mi (8.4/km^{2}). The racial makeup of the township was 99.2% White, 0.1% Black, 0.1% American Indian, 0.3% Asian, and 0.3% from two or more races. Hispanic or Latino of any race were 0.6% of the population.

There were 314 households, out of which 27.1% had children under the age of 18 living with them, 63.4% were married couples living together, 5.1% had a female householder with no husband present, and 24.5% were non-families. 22.3% of all households were made up of individuals, and 12.7% had someone living alone who was 65 years of age or older. The average household size was 2.49 and the average family size was 2.89.

In the township the population was spread out, with 21.3% under the age of 18, 61.2% from 18 to 64, and 17.5% who were 65 years of age or older. The median age was 46.6 years.

The median income for a household in the township was $48,750, and the median income for a family was $58,929. Males had a median income of $33,125 versus $28,654 for females. The per capita income for the township was $20,458. About 5.3% of families and 8.4% of the population were below the poverty line, including 14% of those under age 18 and 19.4% of those age 65 or over.
