= McKinley, Montgomery County, Pennsylvania =

Unincorporated community in Pennsylvania, US

McKinley, Pennsylvania
- census-designated place
- Location within Pennsylvania Location within the United States
- Coordinates: 40°05′05″N 75°07′01″W
- Country: United States
- State: Pennsylvania
- County: Montgomery
- Elevation: 266 ft (81 m)

Population (2020)
  - Total: 3,128
- Time zone: UTC-5 (Eastern (EST))
  - Summer (DST): UTC-4 (EDT)
- Area codes: 215, 267, & 445
- GNIS feature ID: 1204137

McKinley is a census-designated place, in Montgomery County, Pennsylvania, United States. Almost all of it is in Abington Township, while some blocks are in Cheltenham Township. McKinley is located along Forrest Avenue between Pennsylvania Route 73 (Township Line Road) and Jenkintown Road southeast of Jenkintown. As of the 2020 United States census the community had a population of 3,128.

== Education ==
It is almost completely in the Abington School District, with Cheltenham Township School District covering areas in that township. The Abington district operates McKinley Elementary School, the zoned school for the Abington part of the CDP. Abington Middle School and Abington Senior High School are the secondary schools of the Abington district. Elkins Park Middle School (5–6), Cedarbrook Middle School (7–8), and Cheltenham High School are the secondary schools of the Cheltenham district.

Manor College is in the CDP.
