= Jimmy Kieserman =

American basketball player

Personal information
- Born: July 29, 1970 (age 56) Huntingdon Valley, Pennsylvania, U.S.
- Listed height: 5 ft 11 in (1.80 m)
- Listed weight: 165 lb (75 kg)

Career information
- High school: Abington High School (Abington, Pennsylvania)
- College: Rider (1988-1989); Miami (1989-1992)
- Position: Guard

Career history
- 1997-1998: Lancaster Storm

Jimmy "Jim" Kieserman (born July 29, 1970) is an American former basketball player. He played college basketball for the Rider Broncs and Miami Hurricanes. He played professionally for the Lancaster Storm of the Eastern Basketball League in 1997-1998.

== Early life ==
Kieserman was born in Huntingdon Valley, Pennsylvania. He attended Abington High School in Abington, Pennsylvania. Playing on the basketball team at Abington High School, he was the team captain and led the team to a 25-6 record in the Suburban One League championship. Kieserman was named as one of the top 10 athletes in Montgomery County, Pennsylvania. He was also the top golfer and boy's tennis player at Abington High School.

== College career ==
Kieserman began his college career with the Rider Broncs before transferring to the Miami Hurricanes.

== Professional career ==
Kieserman played professionally for the Lancaster Storm of the Eastern Basketball League in 1997-1998.

== National team career ==
He was selected five times to represent the United States in the Maccabiah Games in Israel. At the 2026 Maccabiah Games, Kieserman won a gold medal with Team USA in the basketball Masters 55 division.

== Personal life ==
Kieserman is the grandson of Naismith Basketball Hall of Fame inductee Harry Litwack. He resides in Dresher, Pennsylvania with his wife Amy and daughters Hannah and Jordyn.

== Honors ==
He is an inductee into the Philadelphia Jewish Sports Hall of Fame.
