= Abington, Pennsylvania =

Unincorporated community in Pennsylvania, US

Abington
- Unincorporated community
- Interactive map of Abington
- Country: United States
- State: Pennsylvania
- County: Montgomery
- Township: Abington
- Time zone: UTC-5 (Eastern Standard Time)
  - Summer (DST): UTC-4 (Eastern Daylight Time)
- ZIP Code: 19001

Abington is an unincorporated community in Abington Township, Montgomery County, Pennsylvania, United States, coterminous with the ZIP Code 19001.

== Places of interest ==
- Jefferson Abington Hospital
- Abington Senior High School
- Penn State Abington
