= Roychester, Pennsylvania =

Unincorporated community in Pennsylvania, U.S.

Coordinates: 40.1306°N 75.1124°W

Roychester is an unincorporated community within Abington Township in Montgomery County, Pennsylvania, United States.

== Roychester Park ==
The community is home to a park that shares its name. Roychester Park is roughly 13 acres (53,000 m^{2}), containing a playground, multiple baseball fields, basketball courts, tennis courts, and a natural ice skating rink in the winter. At the center of The Park is Roychester Community House, which is home to many local clubs and organizations. The facility is also used as a polling place.

== Overlook Elementary School ==
Overlook Elementary School is located in the Roychester section of Abington Township. Overlook is part of Abington School District and it teaches students from kindergarten through 6th grade. Their mascot is Oliver Owl.
