= Hollywood, Pennsylvania =

Hollywood can be either of the following places in the U.S. state of Pennsylvania:

- Hollywood, Luzerne County, Pennsylvania
- Hollywood, Montgomery County, Pennsylvania
