= Jefferson Abington Hospital =

- Jefferson Health
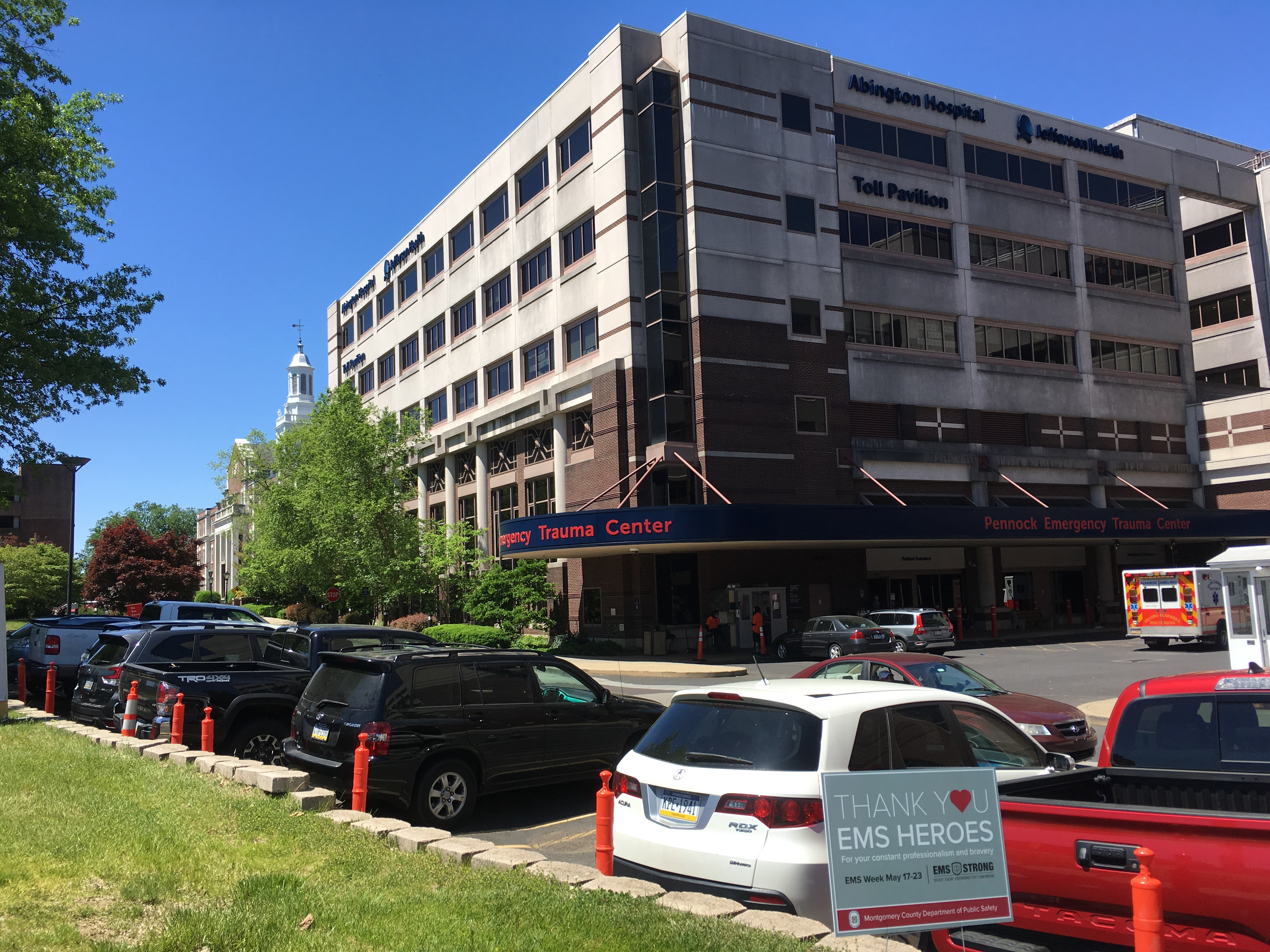
- Jefferson Abington Hospital in Abington Township, Pennsylvania

Geography
- Location: 1200 Old York Road, Abington, Pennsylvania, U.S.
- Coordinates: 40.11910°N 75.1210°W

Organisation
- Type: Teaching

Services
- Emergency department: II
- Beds: 665

Helipads
- Helipad: FAA LID: PN03
Number	Length		Surface
Number	ft	m	Surface
H1	48	15	Concrete

Links
- Website: Jefferson Abington Hospital

Jefferson Abington Hospital, part of Jefferson Health is located in Abington Township, Montgomery County, Pennsylvania, in the northern suburbs of Philadelphia.

The hospital was formerly known as Abington Hospital–Jefferson Health (circa 2015 to 2020), and before that it was long known, throughout its first century, as Abington Memorial Hospital (AMH).

== About ==
The hospital has 665 beds and over 5,500 employees, including more than 1,100 physicians, and is one of the largest employers in Montgomery County. It has the Pennock Emergency Trauma Center, an emergency department with the only Level II trauma center in Montgomery County. Other services offered at the hospital include The Heart and Vascular Institute, The Sidney Kimmel Cancer Center at Jefferson Health-Abington, Neurosciences Institute, Orthopaedic and Spine Institute, Diamond Stroke Center, Muller Institute for Senior Health, and the Institute for Metabolic and Bariatric Surgery. Jefferson Abington Hospital is a non-profit, regional referral center and teaching hospital with five residency programs and operates the Dixon School of Nursing. The hospital also has pharmacy residency programs in pharmacy practice, infectious diseases, and critical care.

== History ==
According to legend, George W. Elkins, a landowner in Abington Township, often took people injured in area car accidents to Philadelphia. When someone died of their injuries on their way, it prompted him to get together with fifty people to raise funds to establish a hospital in Abington. The hospital was dedicated in 1913 as a memorial to Elkins' first wife Stella McIntire. Abington Memorial Hospital opened on May 15, 1914.

In October 2007, Abington Memorial purchased Warminster Hospital from Solis Healthcare, who had acquired it from Tenet Healthcare two months prior. Following the acquisition, the emergency department and inpatient services at Warminster Hospital were closed, and the facility was converted into an outpatient facility called Abington Health Center-Warminster. In October 2008, Abington Memorial purchased Central Montgomery Medical Center, formerly North Penn Hospital, in Lansdale from Universal Health Services. It was later renamed Lansdale Hospital.

In October 2014, Abington Health and Jefferson Health (the latter of which owns Thomas Jefferson University Hospital) announced an intention to merge. An agreement was reached in January 2015, and the merger was completed on May 4, 2015, resulting in Abington-Jefferson Health (now known as Jefferson Health-Abington).

== Locations ==
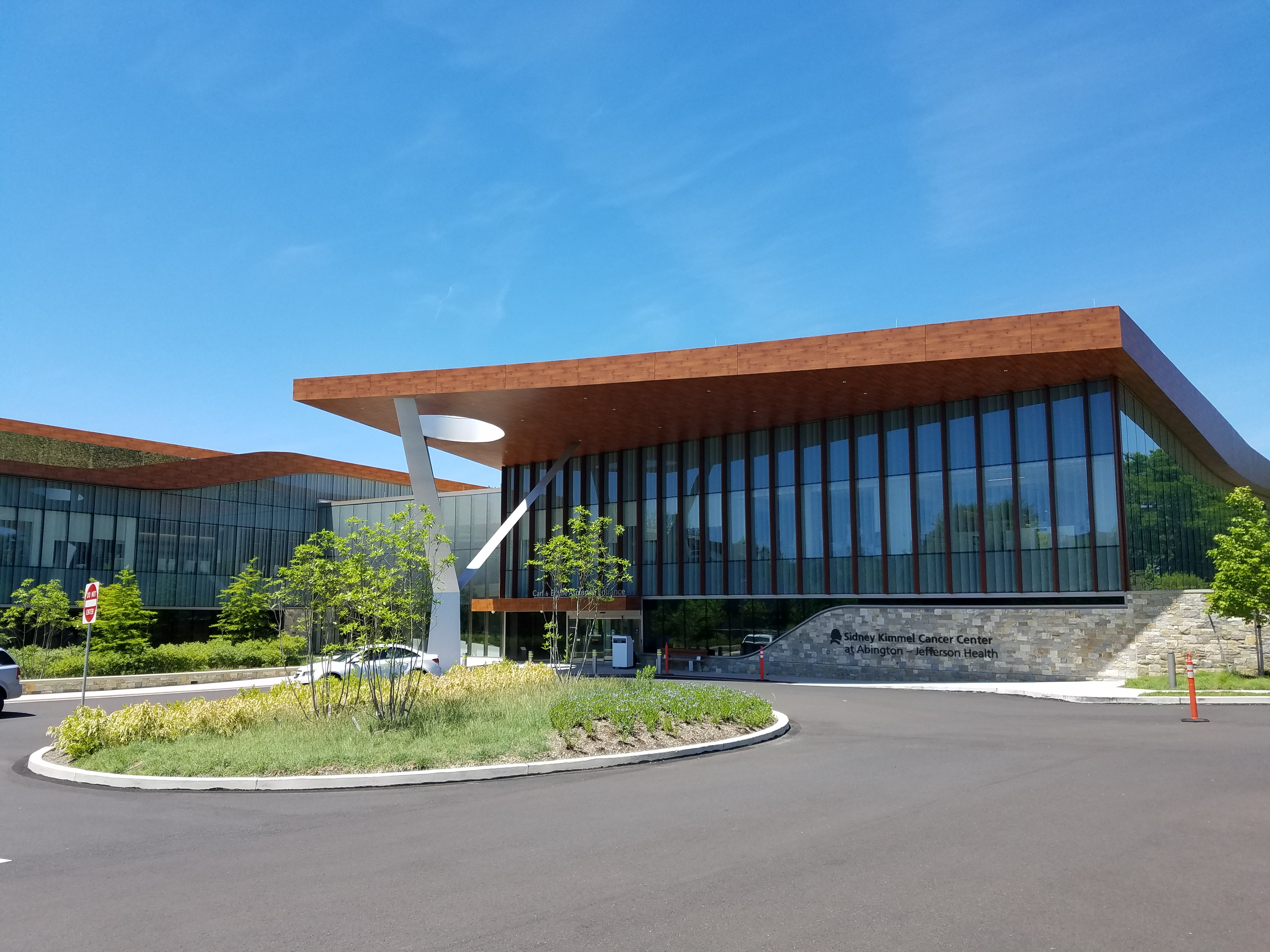
Asplundh Cancer Pavilion

Jefferson Abington Hospital is located along Pennsylvania Route 611 (Old York Road) in Abington Township. Jefferson Health-Abington also owns Jefferson Lansdale Hospital in Lansdale, the 86,000-square-foot outpatient center Asplundh Cancer Pavilion in Willow Grove, urgent care centers in Flourtown and Willow Grove; Jefferson Health–Blue Bell in Blue Bell, Jefferson Health–Elkins Park in Elkins Park, Jefferson Health–Willow Grove in Willow Grove, Jefferson Health–Warminster in Warminster, Jefferson Health–Horsham in Horsham, Jefferson Health–Lower Gwynedd in Lower Gwynedd Township, and Jefferson Health–Montgomeryville in North Wales.

Jefferson Lansdale Hospital has 140 beds and over 700 employees, including over 300 physicians. Services offered at the hospital include an emergency department, Orthopedic and Spine Institute, Pain Center, Sleep Center, and Wound Care Center.

== June Fete ==
The Annual June Fete Village Fair and Horse & Pony Show is a fundraising event run by The Women's Board which consists of 50 active members and is supported by 12 auxiliaries with 630 members.
