= Lancaster Storm =

American defunct basketball team

- Leagues: Eastern Basketball Alliance
- Arena: McCaskey High School
- Location: Lancaster, Pennsylvania, U.S.
- Team colors: Black, Yellow, Red
Home	Away

The Lancaster Storm was an American professional basketball team based in Lancaster, Pennsylvania, competing in the Eastern Basketball Alliance (United Basketball Alliance). The Storm played games at McCaskey High School in Lancaster.

== History ==
The Storm was previously owned by Robert D. Pack. In 2001, Franklin & Marshall College alumni Tyrone Miller became co-owner of the Storm. Due to team management changes the team did not play in the 2001 season and returned to play in 2002.

In the 1990s, the team featured players like Jack Hurd and was led by head coach Ray Oswald. Hurd was a star player for the La Salle Explorers and an All-MAAC first team selection in college. Oswald, was the championship-winning head coach and general manager of the Storm.

Other notable players of the Lancaster Storm included Jimmy Kieserman, a former player for the Miami Hurricanes, played for the Storm in the 1997–98 season and was team captain. Micah Edwards, a former player for the Delaware Fightin' Blue Hens, played for the Storm in 1996–97. Dominique Stevens, a former player for the North Carolina Central Eagles was a member of the Eagles 1989 NCAA Division II title team, and played for the Storm in 2000.

In 1999, Lancaster was league champions, winning the United Basketball Alliance (previously Eastern Basketball Alliance) title.
