= Abington Senior High School =

Public high school in Pennsylvania, United States

Coordinates: 40.1122°N 75.1317°W

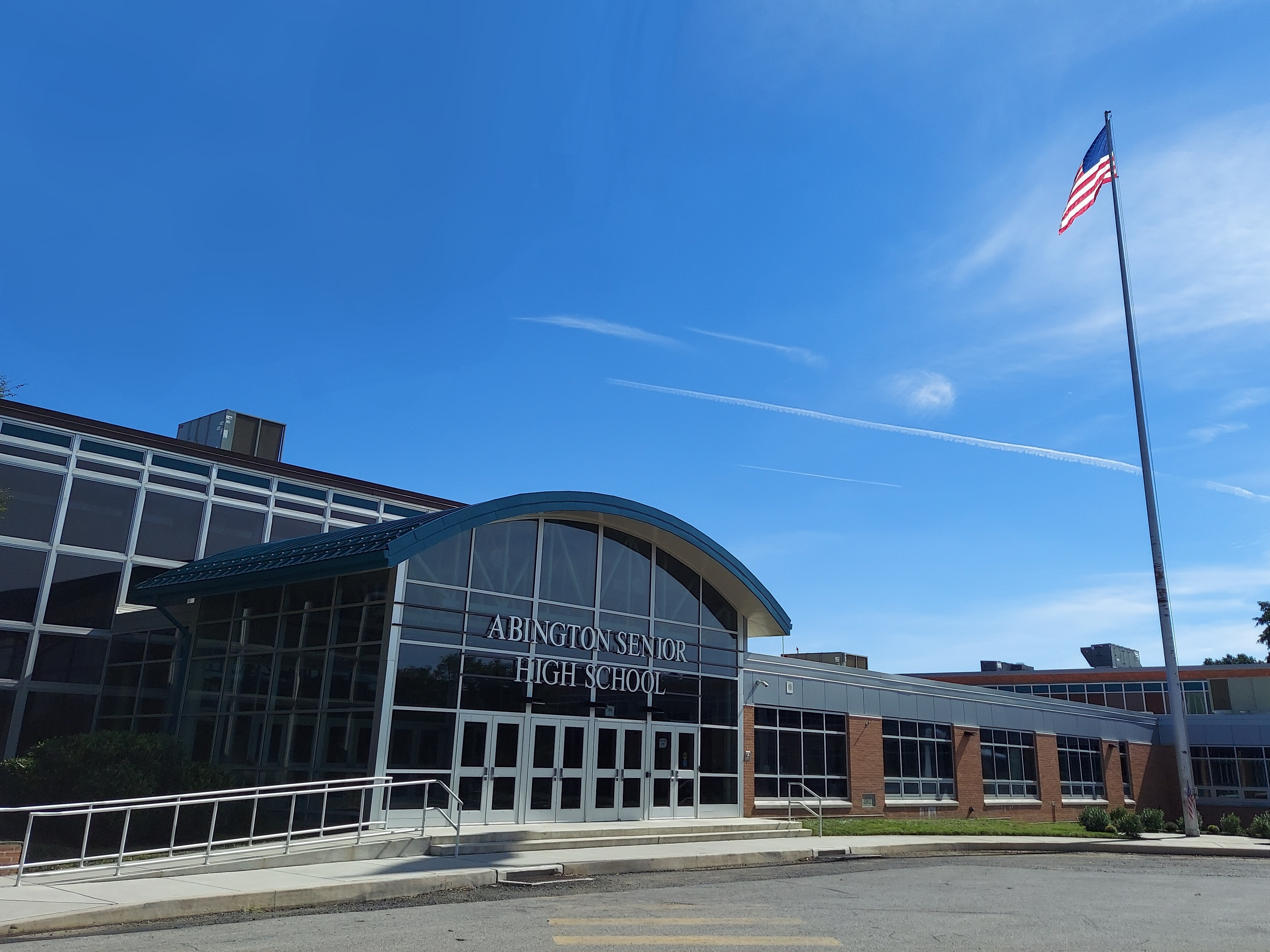
- Abington Senior High School in September 2021

Location
- 900 Highland Ave; Abington, Montgomery County, Pennsylvania 19001; United States

Information
- School type: Public high school
- School district: Abington School District
- Superintendent: Jeffrey S. Fecher
- Principal: Alice Swift
- Staff: 158.00 (on an FTE basis)
- Grades: 9th through 12th
- Gender: Co-Educational
- Enrollment: 2,793 (2023-2024)
- Student to teacher ratio: 17.68
- Schedule type: Semester
- Schedule: Block schedule, A and B days
- Colors: Maroon and white
- Mascot: Galloping Ghost
- Rival: Cheltenham High School
- Website: Abington Senior High School

Abington Senior High School is a four-year co-educational high school in Abington, Pennsylvania, United States. A part of the Abington School District, the school was a two-year high school known as Abington South Campus from September 1964 until June 1983. In September 1983, Abington South Campus again became a three-year high school (grades 10 through 12) and eventually changed its name back to Abington Senior High. In September 2022, Abington Senior High school became a four-year high school (grades 9 through 12). The 2017-2018 enrollment was 1,808. The principal is Dr. Alice Swift. The school is noted for being involved in the landmark supreme court case decision: Abington School District v. Schempp.

== Demographics ==
The 2022–2023 enrollment was 2,749 pupils with 666 in the senior class. The school had at that time 161.60 teachers and a student-teacher ratio of 17.01. The makeup of the student body was: 45.0% White; 31.1% Black; 11.4% Hispanic or Latino, 6.6% Asian, and less than 0.01% Native American or Native Alaskan. 801 students were Free lunch eligible and 34 were eligible for a reduced-price lunch.

== Athletics ==
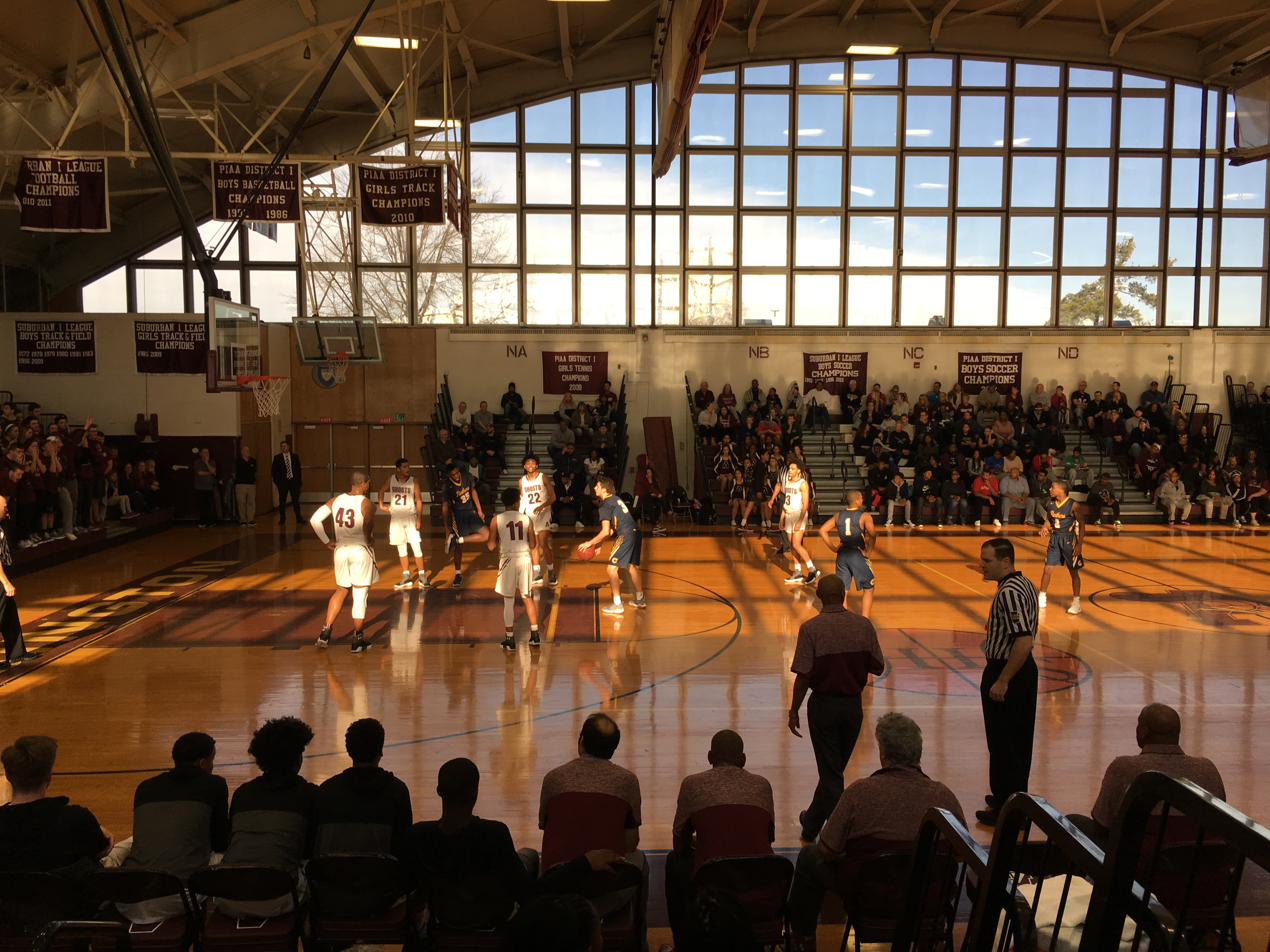
Abington competing against its rival, Cheltenham High School, in 2018

Abington is a member of the Suburban One League (SOL). They are one of the founding members of the SOL, and one of four remaining founding schools.

Abington Senior High School's mascot is a Ghost. The name comes from the late Harold "Red" Grange, a standout professional football player and member of the Pro Football Hall of Fame, who visited the school in 1931, three years after he was petitioned to run for congress as a Republican and refused. He was nicknamed the Galloping Ghost by sports journalist Warren Brown. Grantland Rice wrote a short poem about Grange after watching him play.

A streak of fire, a breath of flame

Eluding all who reach and clutch;

A gray ghost thrown into the game

That rival hands may never touch;

A rubber bounding, blasting soul

Whose destination is the goal — Red Grange of Illinois!

-Grantland Rice

Grantland Rice was a known racist whose father was a cotton dealer and grandfather a Confederate Veteran. Prior to Grange's nickname becoming the school's mascot in the 1930s, Abington was represented by "The Maroons". Maroon and white have continued to be the school's colors over the past century.

== School district ==
The Abington School District includes eight other schools: the middle school, which serves grades 6 through 8, and seven elementary schools, which are (in order by distance from the senior high): Copper Beech, Highland, Roslyn, Overlook, Willow Hill, Rydal, and McKinley.

The Abington School District was involved in a legal case relating to mandatory prayer in school, Abington School District v. Schempp, which was heard by the Supreme Court of the United States on February 27–28, 1963. The ruling handed down on June 17, 1963, decided 8–1 in favor of the respondent, Ellery Schempp, and declared school-sponsored Bible reading in public schools to be an unconstitutional violation of the separation of church and state. The Chief Justice presiding over the case was Earl Warren.

== Honors and distinctions ==
The school was recognized as a Blue Ribbon High School in 1998–99 school year. Abington was a National Service Learning Leader School in 1998 and 2001.

In 2008–2009, Abington won the "Triple Crown" of awards for public school districts in the United States. In 2008, America's Promise Alliance named Abington one of the "100 Best Communities for Young People" for the third year. Shortly thereafter, Money magazine and CNN named Abington as one of the "Top 100 Best Places to Live" in the nation. In its 2009 list of "America's Best High Schools", U.S. News & World Report awarded Abington Senior High School a bronze medal.

Future President and then-Senator Barack Obama spoke at Abington Senior High School on October 3, 2008.

== Facilities ==
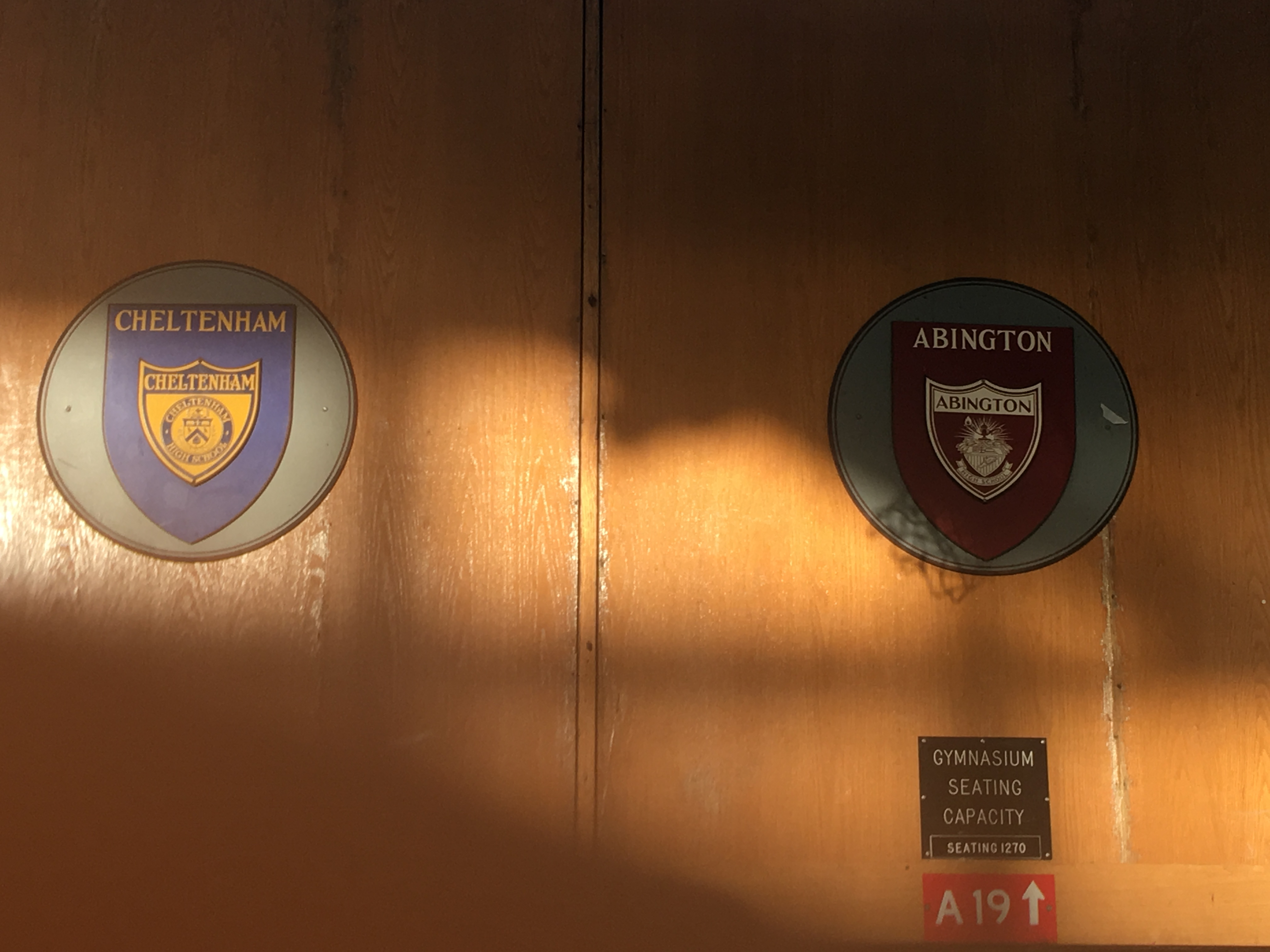
Cheltenham and Abington logos next to each other in the Abington gymnasium

The school completed construction of a football stadium in 2006.

A 1965 graduate of Abington Senior High School, Stephen A. Schwarzman, announced a $25 million donation to the high school on February 15, 2018 which is the highest donation to a public school in history.

The few conditions under which Stephen A. Schwarzman consented to donate the money for the renovation project were: renaming the school to Abington Schwarzman High School, proudly displaying his portrait in the building, naming parts of the school after his brothers, and holding the right to review construction plans for the school as well as choosing a new school logo. However, there was an immediate uproar from the residents of the district regarding the renaming of the school in Stephen A. Schwarzman's honor and the idea got shut down at the School Board Meeting on April 10, 2018, under the premise that they refuse to allow big money to influence their community. Instead, the original agreement was revised to simply naming the new science and technology center after Stephen A. Schwarzman. This project broke ground on November 2, 2018. The grand re-opening of the additions and renovations to Abington Senior High School and the Stephen A. Schwarzman Center for Science and Technology was commemorated on Friday, August 26, 2022.

== Notable alumni ==
- Wayne Ambler, baseball player
- Adam Aron, CEO of AMC Theatres, co-owner of the Philadelphia 76ers
- Molly Bair, supermodel
- Amar Bose, chairman and founder of Bose Corporation.
- Ashton Carter, United States Secretary of Defense.
- James K. Coyne III, U.S. Representative from Pennsylvania
- David Christiana, illustrator and author
- Ellie Daniel, Olympic swimming medalist
- Eric Dixon, basketball player
- Maddy Evans, soccer player
- Susan Francia, Olympic rower
- Randy Garber, former professional soccer player
- Eddie George, 1995 Heisman Trophy Winner
- Don Hasenmayer, former Major League Baseball player for Philadelphia Phillies
- Amir Hinton, basketball player
- Jimmy Kieserman, basketball player
- Florence LaRue, lead singer of The 5th Dimension
- I Michael Leitman, American Surgeon and Dean of Graduate Medical Education for Icahn School of Medicine
- Harry (Matt) Meyers, President of Pennsylvania Institute of Technology
- Larry Probst, chairman of Electronic Arts and chairman of the United States Olympic Committee
- Craig Reynolds, football player
- Bob Saget, comedian and television celebrity
- Ellery Schempp, Abington School District v. Schempp, court case that led to the banning of organized prayer in all public schools
- Stephen A. Schwarzman, founder of the Blackstone Group
- Susan Seidelman, film director
- Jeffrey Sonnenfeld, professor, Yale School of Management
- David Starr, professional wrestler
- Lee Ving, musician, frontman for Fear (band)
- Danny Woodburn, actor
- Shawn Wooden, football player
- Rick Potts, American archaeologist and curator at the Smithsonian National Museum of Natural History

== See also ==
- Abington Township High School, about the previous school campus
- List of high schools in Pennsylvania
