= Ellery Schempp =

American physicist

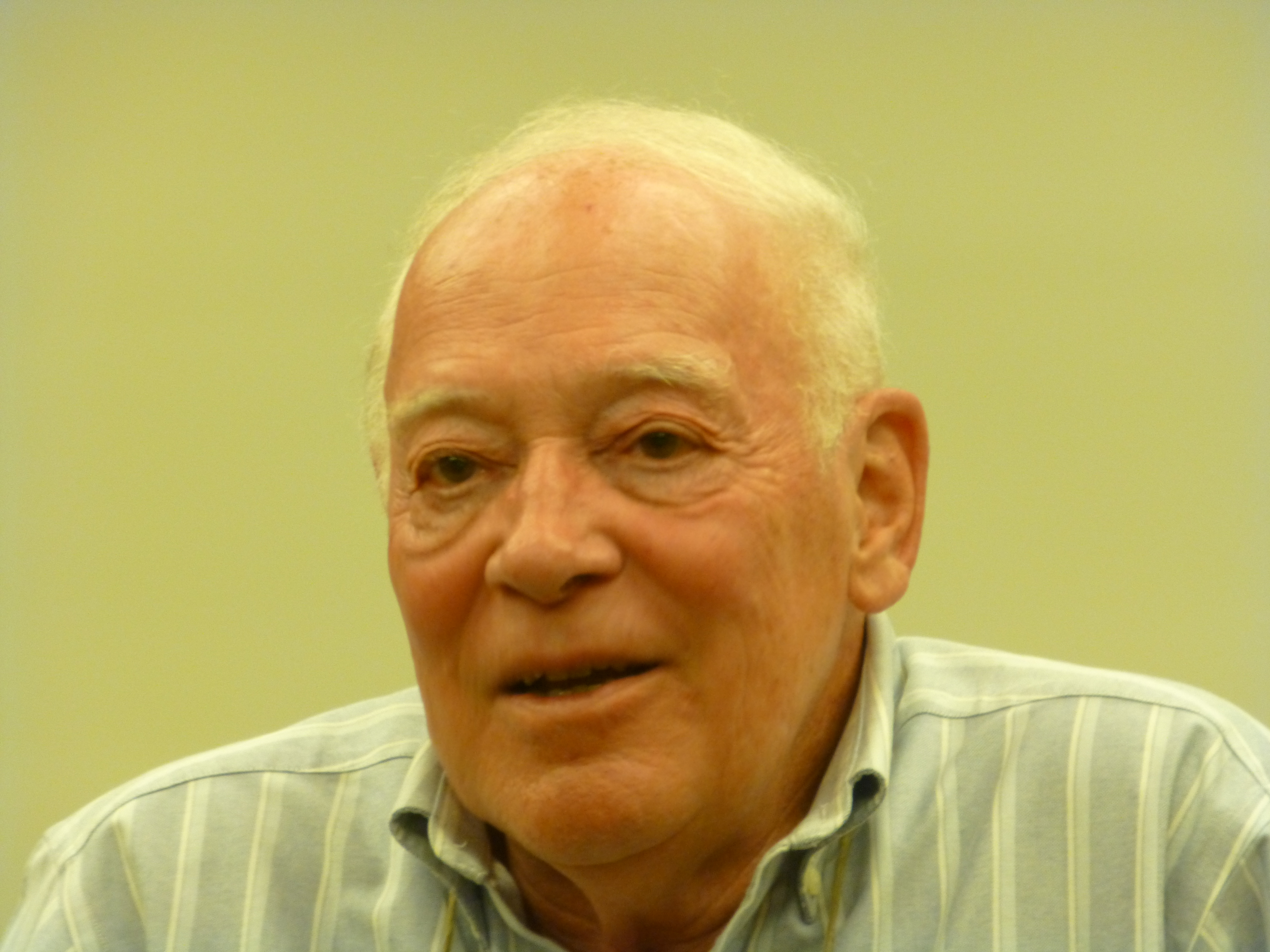
- Ellery Schempp in 2012
- Born: August 5, 1940 (age 85); Philadelphia, PA

Ellery Schempp (born Ellory Schempp, August 5, 1940) is an American physicist and the primary student involved in the landmark 1963 United States Supreme Court decision of Abington School District v. Schempp which declared that required public school sanctioned Bible readings were unconstitutional.

== Biography ==
Schempp was born in Philadelphia and grew up in the Roslyn community of Abington Township. He graduated from Abington High School in 1958, and attended Tufts University where he earned bachelor degrees in physics and geology. In 1967, Schempp received his Ph.D. in physics from Brown University.

In 1977, Schempp was part of the Pittsburgh Explorer's Group Nanga Parbat Expedition which was to be the first American group to reach the peak of Nanga Parbat in Pakistan.

Schempp, who is retired, currently resides in Boston, Massachusetts.

Stephen D. Solomon, a professor at New York University, has written a book about Schempp and the Supreme Court case entitled Ellery’s Protest: How One Young Man Defied Tradition and Sparked the Battle over School Prayer.

== Activism ==
On November 26, 1956, Schempp staged a protest against the school requiring that each student read 10 Bible passages and the Lord's Prayer each day during homeroom. That day he brought a copy of the Qur'an and read from it; for this he was sent to the principal's office. With the help of his father, Edward Schempp, and the American Civil Liberties Union, they sued the Abington School district over their policy of mandatory Bible readings.

To maintain standing in the case, Schempp (and later his younger siblings Roger and Donna) continued to fight this policy in the courts over several years. The Schempps were Unitarian Universalists, a theologically liberal religious community. The case was eventually decided in Schempps's favor by the Supreme Court in 1963, five years after he had graduated from high school. The precedent that this decision established, that the public school does not have the right to sponsor religious exercises and then pressure students to take part in them has appeared time and time again in every church-state case focusing on religion in public schools.

Schempp considers himself to be an atheist, but supports the Unitarian Universalist organizations and is a strong supporter of the ACLU and of the separation of church and state. He is a popular speaker at Unitarian Universalist and secular humanist meetings, where he speaks about his landmark protest as well as the current state of democracy, the Constitution, and the Bill of Rights. As of 2011, he was still active in the Bedford Unitarian Universalist church near his home.

Schempp is a member of the American Humanist Association, the Freedom from Religion Foundation, and Americans United for the Separation of Church and State. In 1996, he received the Religious Liberty Award from Americans United. In 2005, he received the Humanist Religious Liberty Award from AHA. He is on the advisory board of the Secular Student Alliance and the Secular Coalition for America. He has traveled throughout the country talking about his experiences.

In 2002, Schempp was elected to Abington Senior High School's hall of fame for his accomplishments in physics. In his acceptance speech, he said that "When I left Abington in 1958, it wasn’t clear that Abington ever wanted to see me again". The award did include the notation “Initiated school prayer suit against Abington which was eventually decided by U.S. Supreme Court in 1963.”

== Physics ==
Schempp's doctoral thesis was entitled Nuclear Quadrupole Resonance in Nitrogen Heterocycles. This work was the precursor to the development of magnetic resonance imaging (MRI) on which he continued to work for a substantial portion of his career.
