= Hollywood, Montgomery County, Pennsylvania =

Unincorporated community in Pennsylvania, US

Hollywood, Pennsylvania
- Unincorporated community
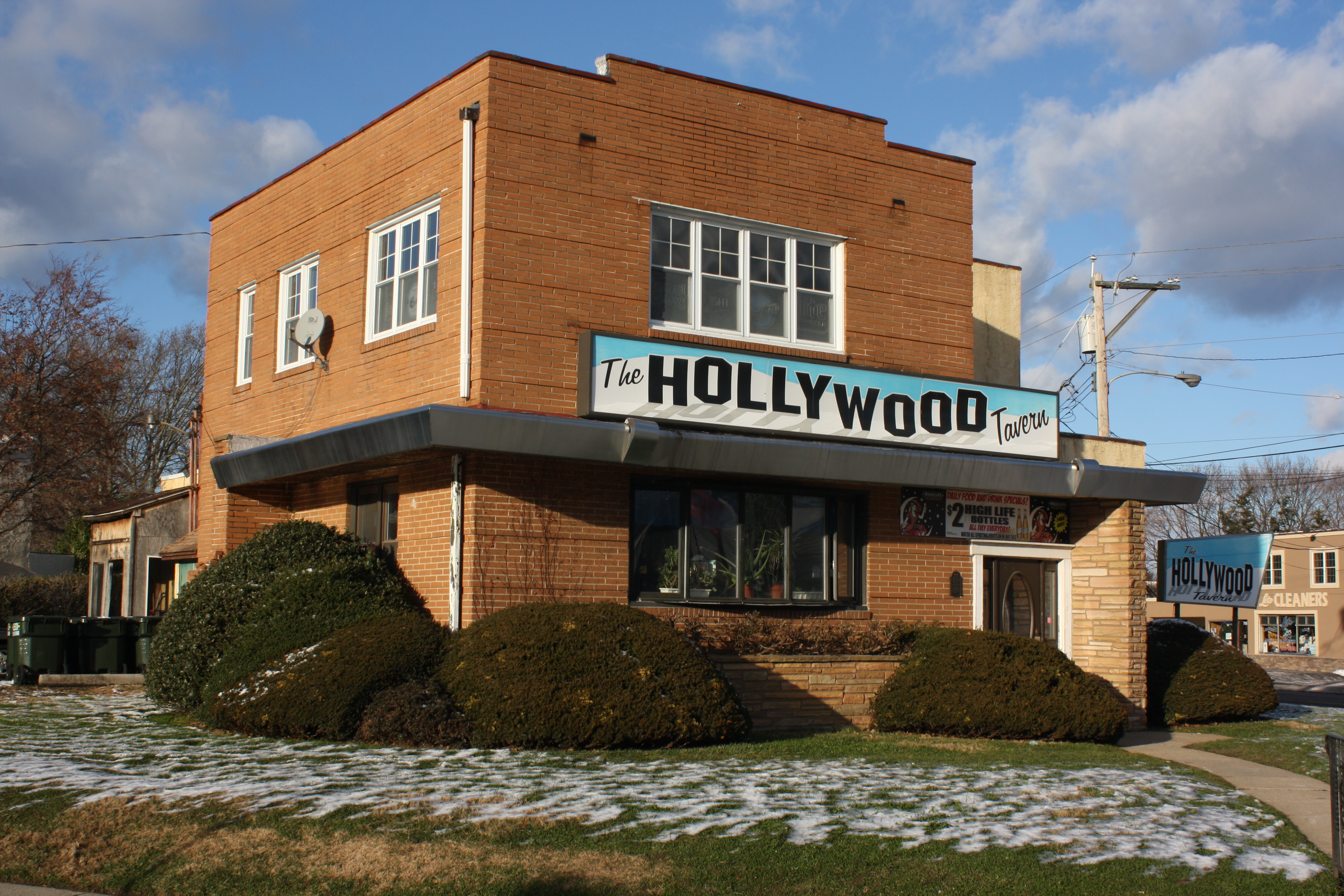
- Hollywood Tavern at the corner of Huntingdon Pike and Gibson Avenue

- Location within Pennsylvania Location within the United States
- Coordinates: 40°05′23″N 75°05′37″W
- Country: United States
- State: Pennsylvania
- County: Montgomery
- Township: Abington
- Elevation: 246 ft (75 m)
- Time zone: UTC-5 (Eastern (EST))
  - Summer (DST): UTC-4 (EDT)
- ZIP code: 19046
- Area codes: 215, 267 and 445
- GNIS feature ID: 1203828

Hollywood is an unincorporated community in the southern portion of Abington Township, Montgomery County, Pennsylvania, United States. It is well known for its collection of Southern California-style homes.

== History ==
The 174-home neighborhood got its start when a builder from California, Gustav Weber, filed plans to build a small subdivision in 1928. The homes were built in pastel colors with flat roofs, similar to Spanish-style homes in the Los Angeles area. Streets were named Los Angeles, San Diego, Pasadena and San Gabriel.

One of Weber's problems, however, was that the neighborhood landscaping and hardscaping features were not built to cope with the Northeastern winters. Plants native to Southern California and Moravian tile sidewalks were included in his plans. The plants died in the cold. The tile cracked and was replaced by concrete. As a result, modifications were made to the area after it was built.

The neighborhood was never finished according to Weber's plans. Possible reasons ranged from the 1929 stock market crash to an unfaithful wife. A local developer finished the development in the 1940s.

The Pennsylvania Historical and Museum Commission has listed the area as eligible for national registry. As a result, residents may apply for federal grants to maintain the historical character of the neighborhood.

== Gallery ==
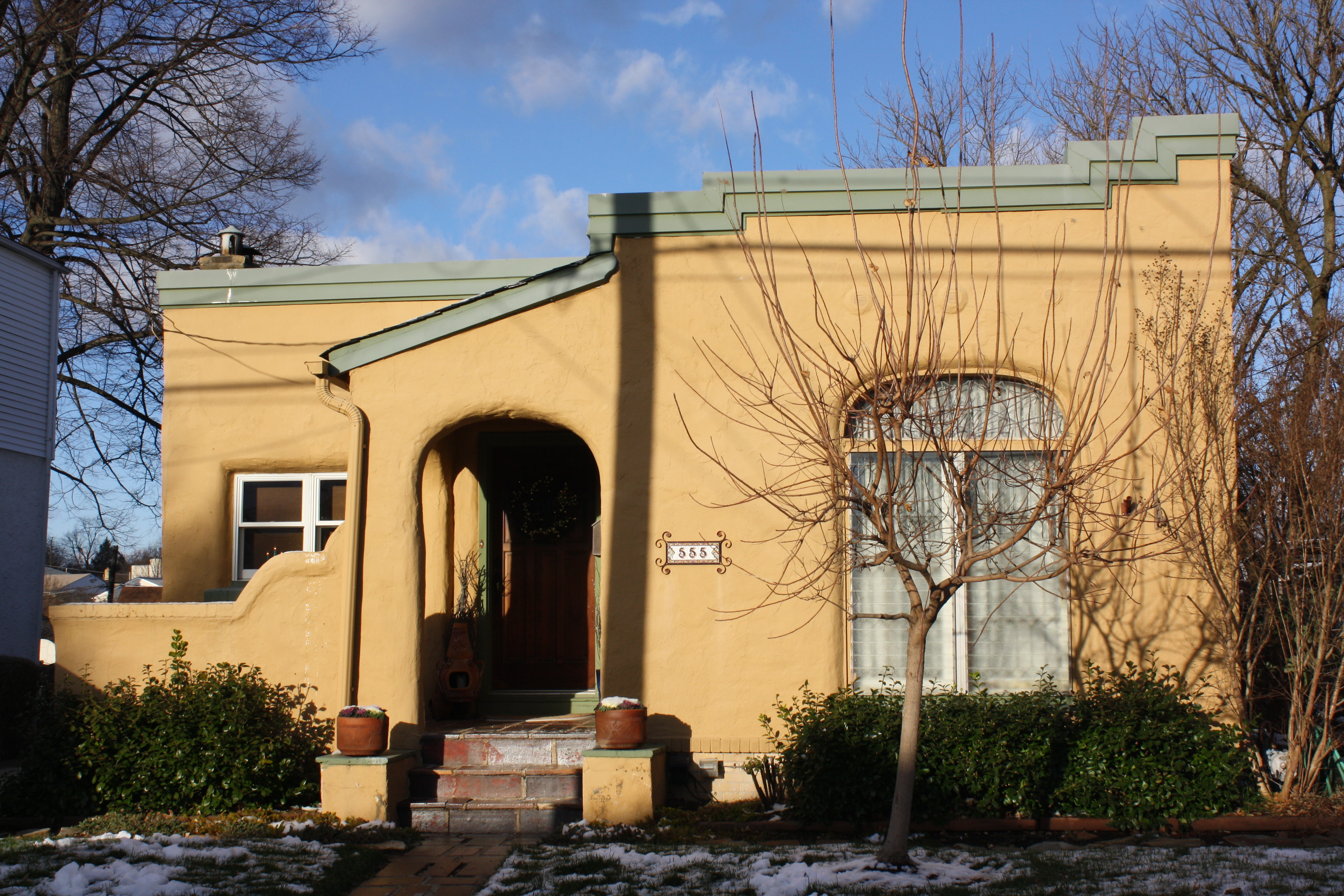

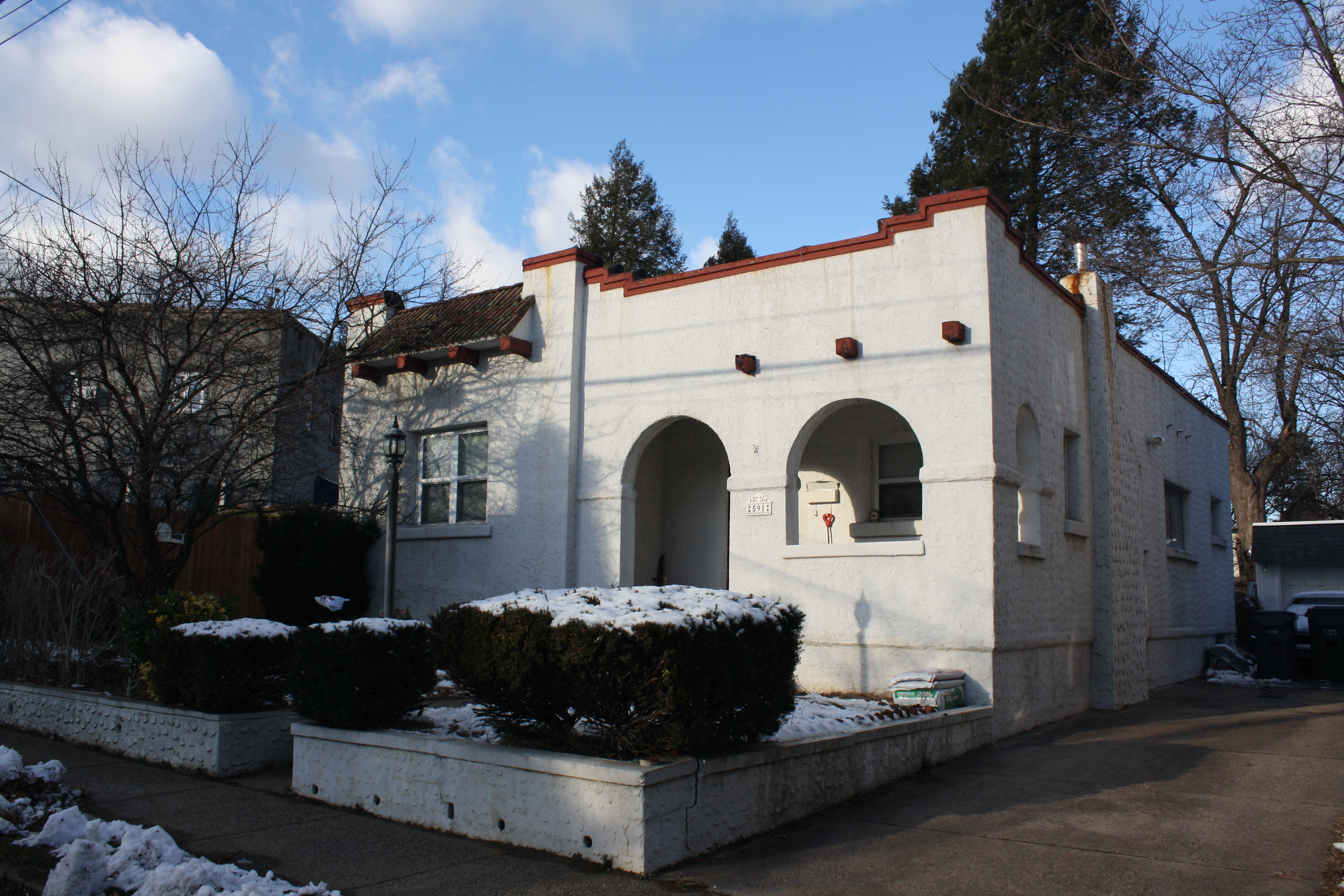

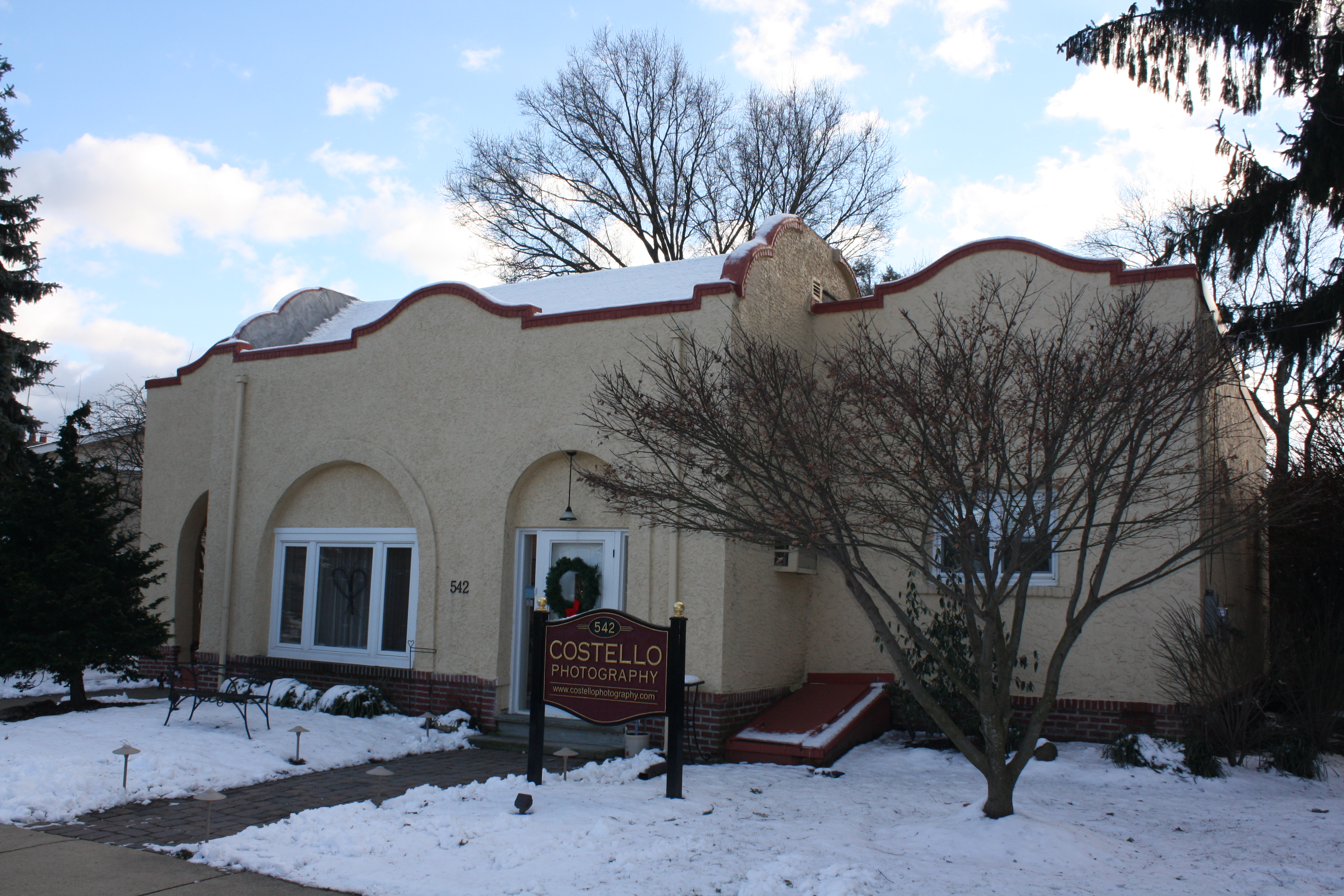

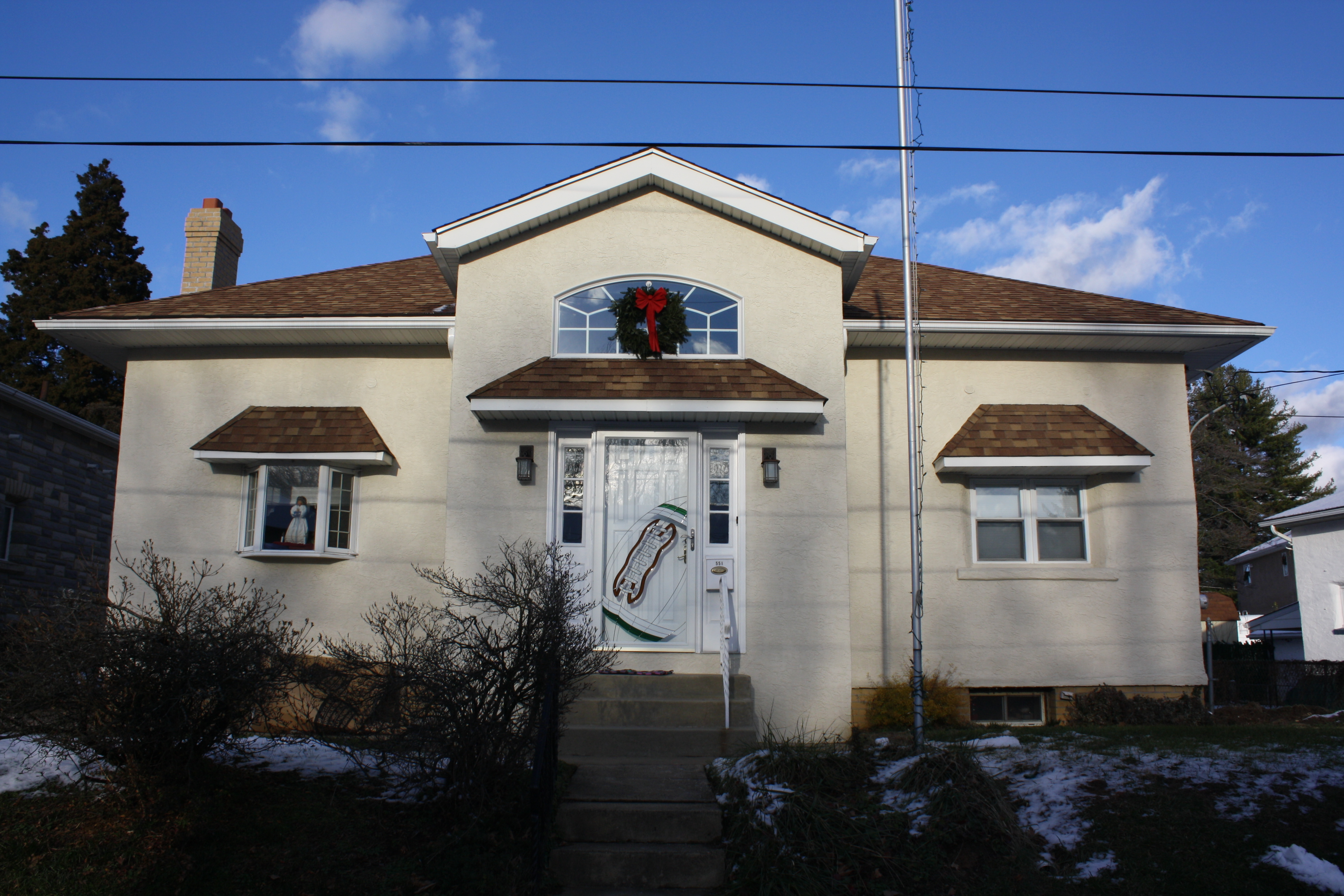

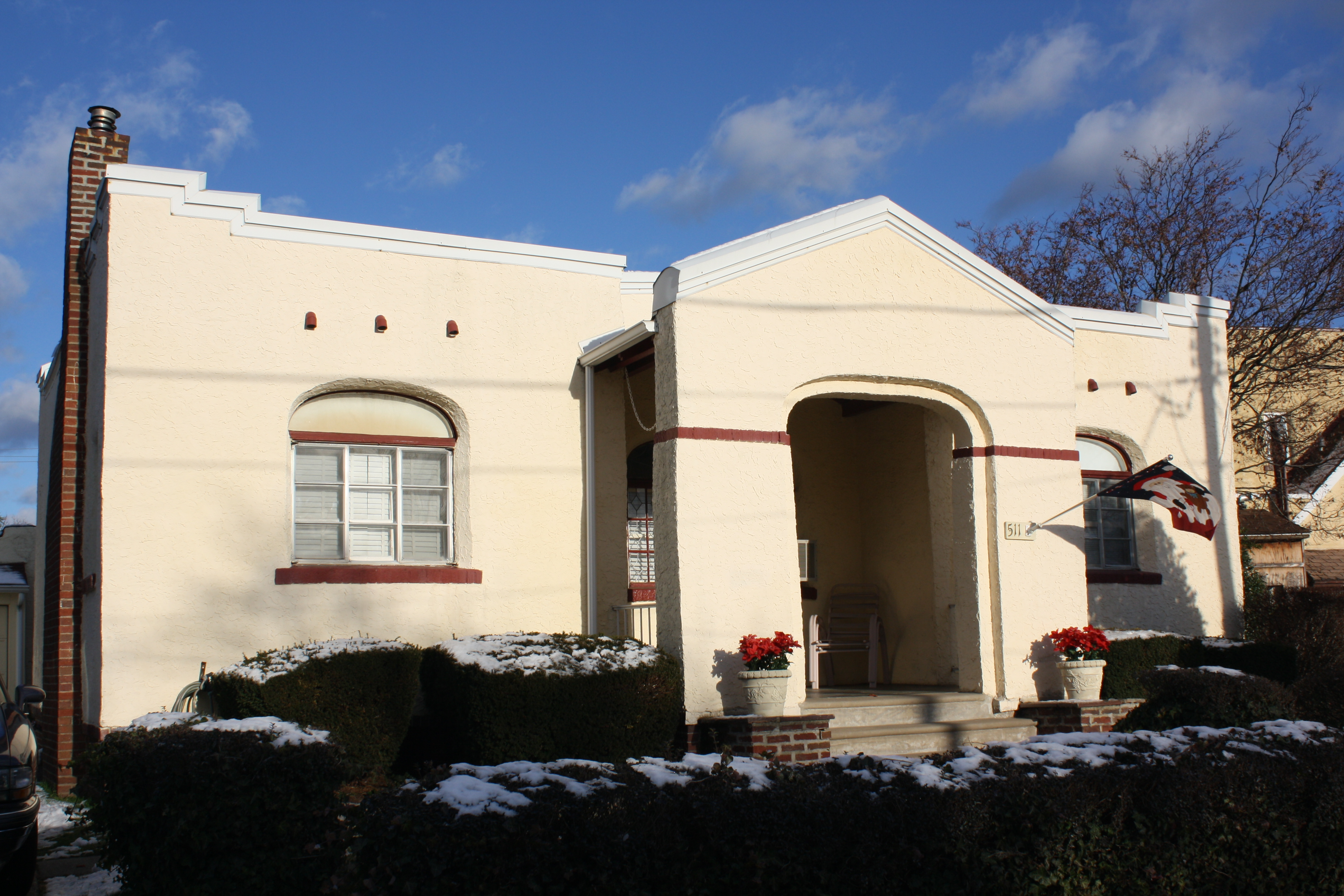
