= Abington Township, Montgomery County, Pennsylvania =

Township in Pennsylvania, US

Abington Township
- Township
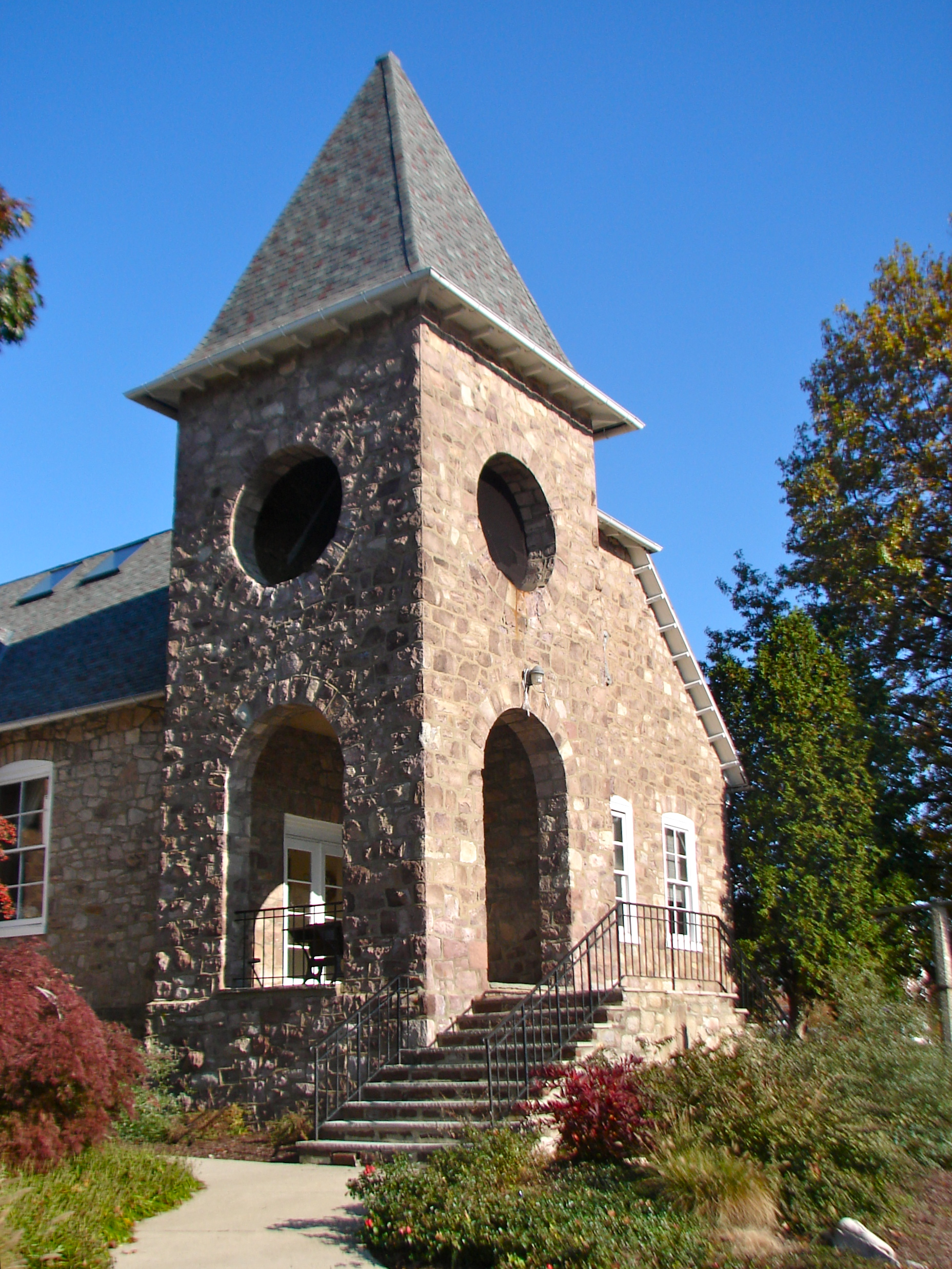
- Abington Township High School

- Flag Seal

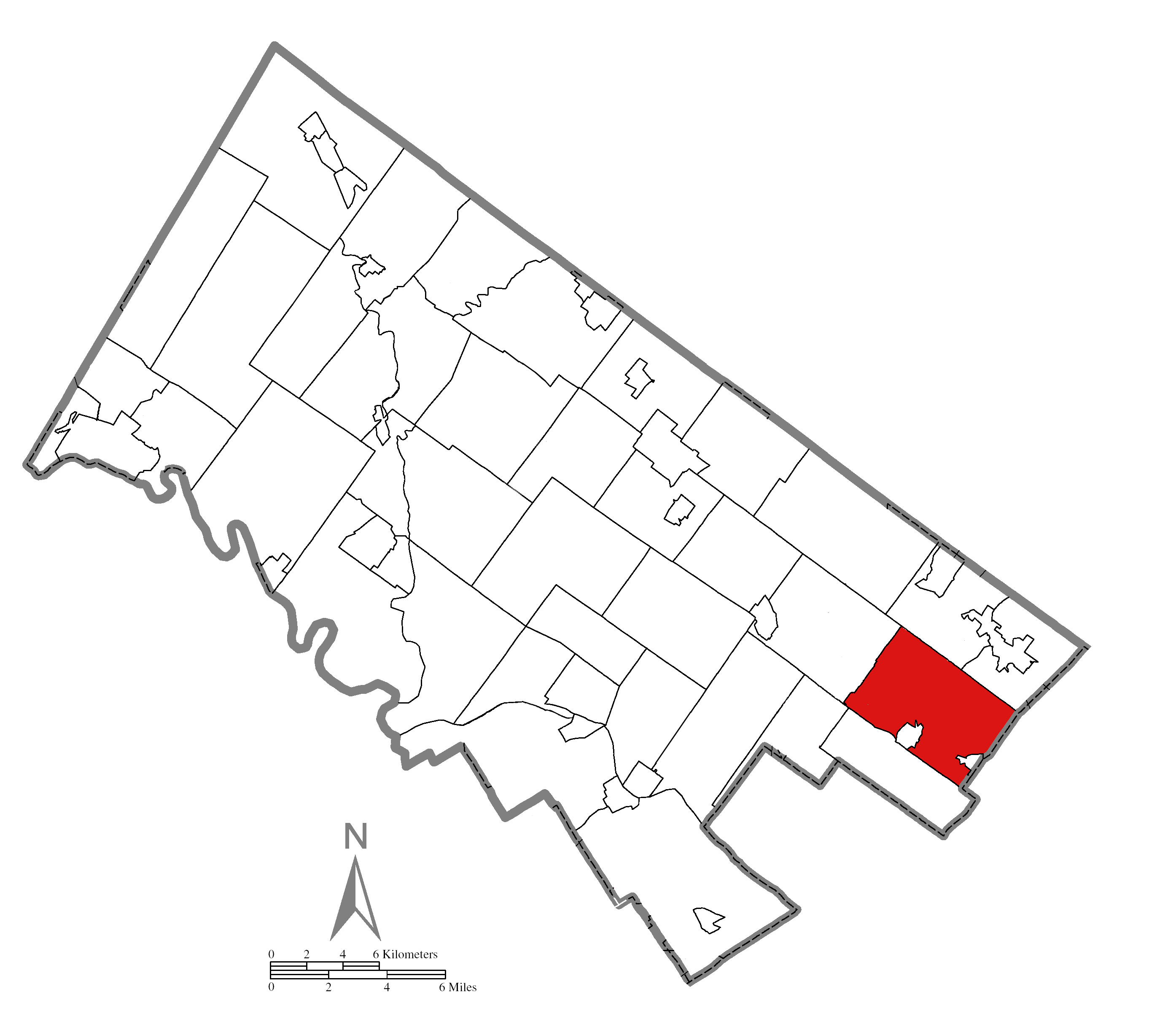
- Location of Abington Township in Montgomery County, Pennsylvania
- Interactive map of Abington Township
- Location of Abington in Pennsylvania Abington Township (the United States)
- Coordinates: 40°06′00″N 75°05′59″W
- Country: United States
- State: Pennsylvania
- County: Montgomery
- First Established: 1704
- Incorporated: 1704

Government
  - President of the Board of Commissioners: Thomas Hecker

Area
  - Total: 15.52 sq mi (40.2 km^{2})
  - Land: 15.52 sq mi (40.2 km^{2})
  - Water: 0.00 sq mi (0 km^{2})
- Elevation: 282 ft (86 m)

Population (2020)
  - Total: 58,502
  - Estimate (2022-07-01): 58,460
  - Density: 3,769/sq mi (1,455/km^{2})
- Demonym: Abingtonian
- Time zone: UTC−5 (Eastern (EST))
  - Summer (DST): UTC−4 (EDT)
- ZIP Codes: 19001, 19006, 19027, 19038, 19046, 19090
- Area codes: 215, 267, and 445
- FIPS code: 42-091-00156
- Website: abingtonpa.gov

Abington Township is a township in Montgomery County, Pennsylvania, United States. It is adjacent to Northeast Philadelphia and is part of the Philadelphia metropolitan area.The population was 58,502 as of the 2020 census, making it the second most populous township in Montgomery County after Lower Merion Township. The population density is 3603.3 per square mile (1,377/km^{2}), making it the second most densely populated township in Montgomery County after Cheltenham Township.

Abington Township is one of Montgomery County's oldest communities, dating back before 1700 and being incorporated in 1704. It is home to some of the county's oldest transportation routes, industries and churches. Many of these older business and transportation centers were the forerunners of modern Abington. Abington contains the Willow Grove Park Mall, several small businesses, and a few of Montgomery County's largest employers.

== History ==
The land that comprises Abington today was purchased from the native Lenape by William Penn during the 1680s. By the next decade, a handful of European settlers built and lived in Hill Township, at the crossroads of Susquehanna Street Road and Old York Road. After brief times under other names, the township incorporated as Abington in 1704. The town's name is likely taken from parishes in England formed over 900 years ago in Northamptonshire or Cambridgeshire. A local 1734 census counted 42 resident landowners. During the American Revolutionary War, there was a small battle that took place at Edge Hill.

Some institutions have been in Abington for most of its existence. The cornerstone of the original Abington Friends School, in operation since before Abington's incorporation, is used in today's school building. The Abington Presbyterian Church opened in the early years of the township, and while the original building is gone, its graveyard is still used today.

The railroad reached the township in 1855, with the first station building erected in 1873 on the site of today's Noble Station.

Abington Township High School and Fox Chase Farm are listed on the National Register of Historic Places.

== Geography ==
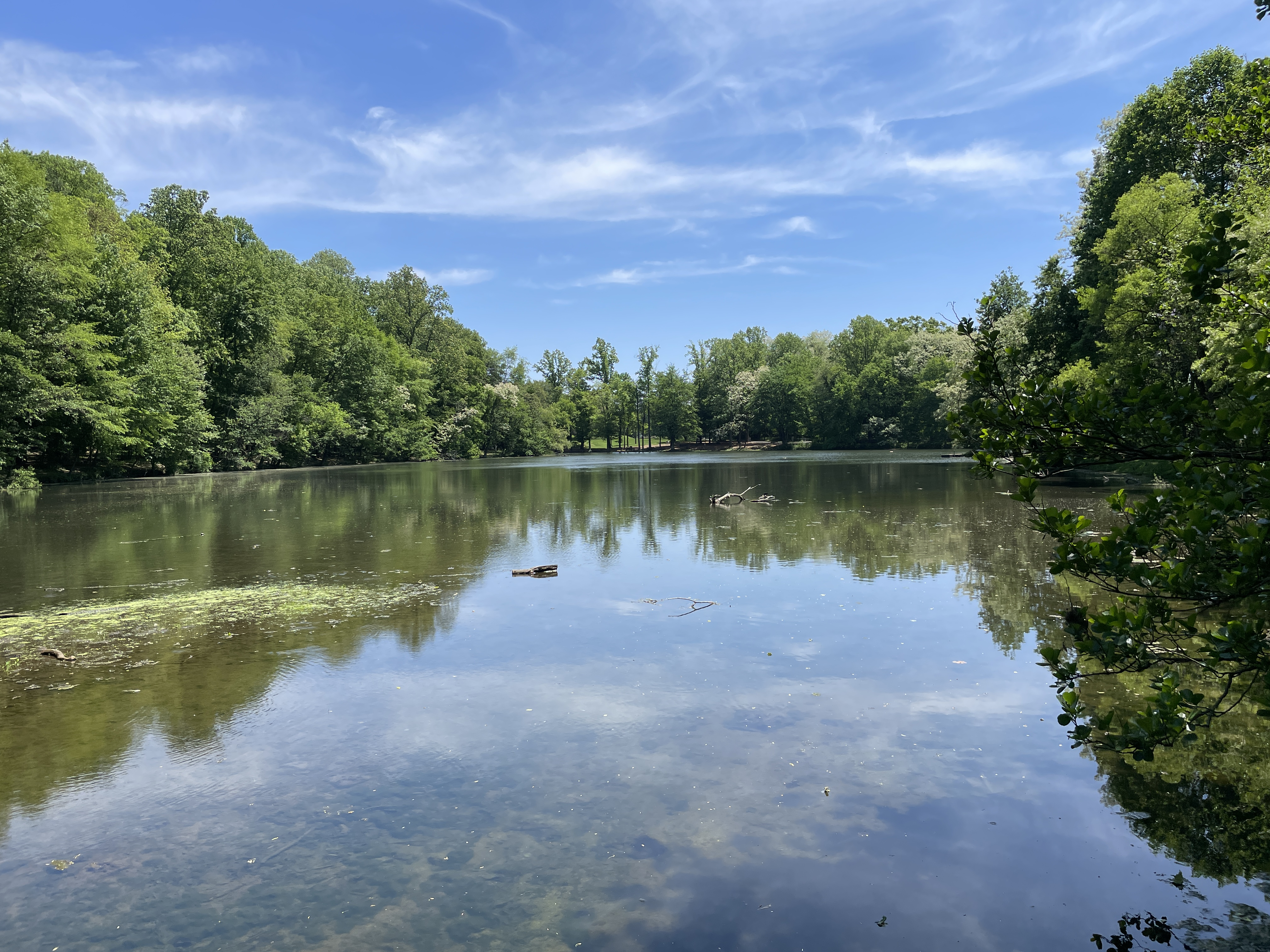
Pond in Alverthorpe Park

According to the U.S. Census Bureau, the township has a total area of 15.5 square miles (40 km^{2}), of which 15.4 square miles (40 km^{2}) is land.

== Communities ==
Abington Township comprises seventeen "communities":

- Abington
- Ardsley (also in Upper Dublin)
- Crestmont
- Elkins Park (also in Cheltenham)
- Fitzwatertown
- Glenside (also in Cheltenham)
- Hollywood
- Huntingdon Valley (also in Lower Moreland and Upper Moreland)
- Jenkintown (Abington's Jenkintown community abuts on three sides the smaller independent borough of Jenkintown)
- McKinley
- Meadowbrook
- Noble
- North Hills (also in Springfield and Upper Dublin)
- Roslyn
- Roychester
- Rydal
- Willow Grove (also in Upper Dublin and Upper Moreland)

The communities are unofficial, unincorporated subdivisions of the township, corresponding roughly to voting districts and elementary school placement. Their primary importance, aside from community identity, is the postal system (e.g., to send a letter to someone living in the Glenside community, the letter would be addressed to Glenside, Pennsylvania rather than Abington Township, Pennsylvania). Additionally, some portions of some of these subdivisions, including Ardsley, Glenside, Huntingdon Valley, Jenkintown, North Hills, Willow Grove, and Elkins Park, are actually in neighboring townships or boroughs.

Local civic associations include Crestmont Civic Association, Glenside Gardens Civic Association, Hollywood Civic Association, Lower Huntingdon Valley Civic Association, McKinley Civic Association, Rydal-Meadowbrook Civic Association and Tall Trees Association. The civic associations work together on Traffic Summits in even years (2012, 2014, 2016, etc.) and Economic Summits in odd years (2013, 2015, 2017, etc.). These events focus on eliminating traffic congestion that interferes with the growth of businesses in the Township.

Climate data for Abington Township, Pennsylvania
| Month | Jan | Feb | Mar | Apr | May | Jun | Jul | Aug | Sep | Oct | Nov | Dec | Year |
|---|---|---|---|---|---|---|---|---|---|---|---|---|---|
| Mean daily maximum °F (°C) | 37 (3) | 42 (6) | 50 (10) | 62 (17) | 72 (22) | 81 (27) | 85 (29) | 84 (29) | 77 (25) | 65 (18) | 54 (12) | 43 (6) | 63 (17) |
| Mean daily minimum °F (°C) | 21 (−6) | 42 (6) | 32 (0) | 41 (5) | 51 (11) | 63 (17) | 67 (19) | 65 (18) | 56 (13) | 43 (6) | 34 (1) | 26 (−3) | 45 (7) |
| Average precipitation inches (mm) | 3.44 (87) | 3.01 (76) | 4.32 (110) | 4.12 (105) | 4.37 (111) | 4.60 (117) | 5.05 (128) | 3.98 (101) | 4.53 (115) | 3.82 (97) | 3.94 (100) | 4.23 (107) | 49.41 (1,254) |
Source: The Weather Channel

== Demographics ==
Historical population
| Year | Pop. | ±% |
|---|---|---|
| 1890 | 2,703 | — |
| 1900 | 3,803 | +40.7% |
| 1910 | 5,896 | +55.0% |
| 1920 | 8,684 | +47.3% |
| 1930 | 18,648 | +114.7% |
| 1940 | 20,857 | +11.8% |
| 1950 | 28,988 | +39.0% |
| 1960 | 55,831 | +92.6% |
| 1970 | 63,625 | +14.0% |
| 1980 | 58,836 | −7.5% |
| 1990 | 56,322 | −4.3% |
| 2000 | 56,103 | −0.4% |
| 2010 | 55,310 | −1.4% |
| 2020 | 58,502 | +5.8% |

As of the 2010 census, the township was 79.7% White, 12.4% Black or African American, 0.1% Native American, 4.9% Asian, and 2.1% were two or more races. 3.2% of the population were of Hispanic or Latino ancestry.

As of 2008, the U.S. Census Bureau estimated there were 55,234 people, 21,252 occupied households, and 14,819 families residing in the township. The population density was 3,563 inhabitants per square mile (1,376/km^{2}). The racial makeup of the township was 80% White, 12% Black, 3% Asian, a fraction of a percent Pacific Islander, 1% from other races, and 3% from two or more races. Hispanic or Latino of any race were 3% of the population.

There were 21,252 households, out of which 32% had children under the age of 18 living with them, 11% had a female householder with no husband present, 56% were married couples living together, and 30% were non-families. 26% of all households were made up of individuals, and 12% had someone living alone who was 65 years of age or older. The average household size was 2.56 and the average family size was 3.11.

In the township, the population was spread out, with 22% under the age of 18, 9% from 18 to 24, 25% from 25 to 44, 29% from 45 to 64, and 16% who were 65 years of age or older. The median age was 42 years. The population was 47% male, and 53% female.

The median income for a household in the township was $77,363, and the median income for a family was $94,473. The per capita income for the township was $38,737. About 2% of families and 3% of the population were below the poverty line, including 1% of those under age 18 and 5% of those age 65 or over.

== Government ==
Presidential elections results
| Year | Republican | Democratic |
|---|---|---|
| 2024 | 32.2% 11,778 | 66.8% 24,472 |
| 2020 | 30.6% 11,325 | 67.8% 25,079 |
| 2016 | 30.5% 9,983 | 65.0% 21,287 |
| 2012 | 35.7% 11,253 | 63.1% 19,871 |
| 2008 | 34.4% 11,244 | 64.8% 21,210 |
| 2004 | 38.0% 12,116 | 61.7% 19,667 |
| 2000 | 38.4% 10,808 | 59.0% 16,586 |
| 1996 | 37.2% 9,670 | 53.6% 13,933 |
| 1992 | 37.9% 13,933 | 46.3% 13,736 |

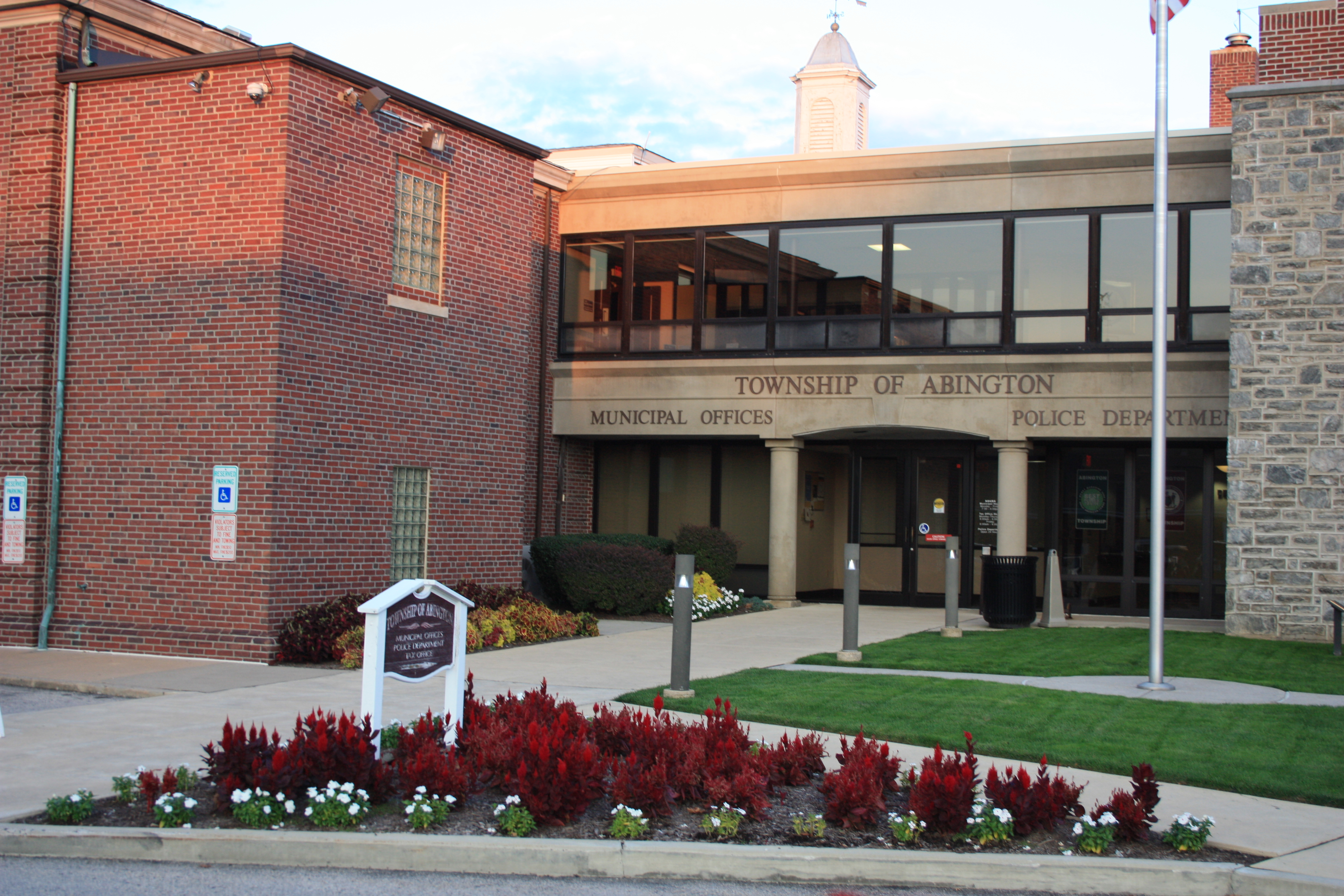
Abington Township Building

Abington Township is a First Class Township governed by a Board of Commissioners who are elected one from each of the township's fifteen wards. A President of the Board is elected from among these commissioners, and serves as the head of government for Abington Township. Thomas Hecker is the current President of the Board of Commissioners.

All of the township is in the Fourth Congressional District and is represented by Rep. Madeleine Dean (D).

All of the township falls within the 4th Senatorial District in the Pennsylvania Senate and is Represented by Art Haywood (D).

Most of the township falls within the 153rd Legislative District in the PA House of Representatives and is represented by Ben Sanchez (D), with the northern portion of township within the 152nd Legislative District represented by Nancy Guenst (D).

In 2004, Pennsylvanian political scientists Dr. G. Terry Madonna and Dr. Michael Young identified Abington Township as an especially interesting political bellwether — a local area "looked to for early readings of how national elections will turn out."

== Economy ==
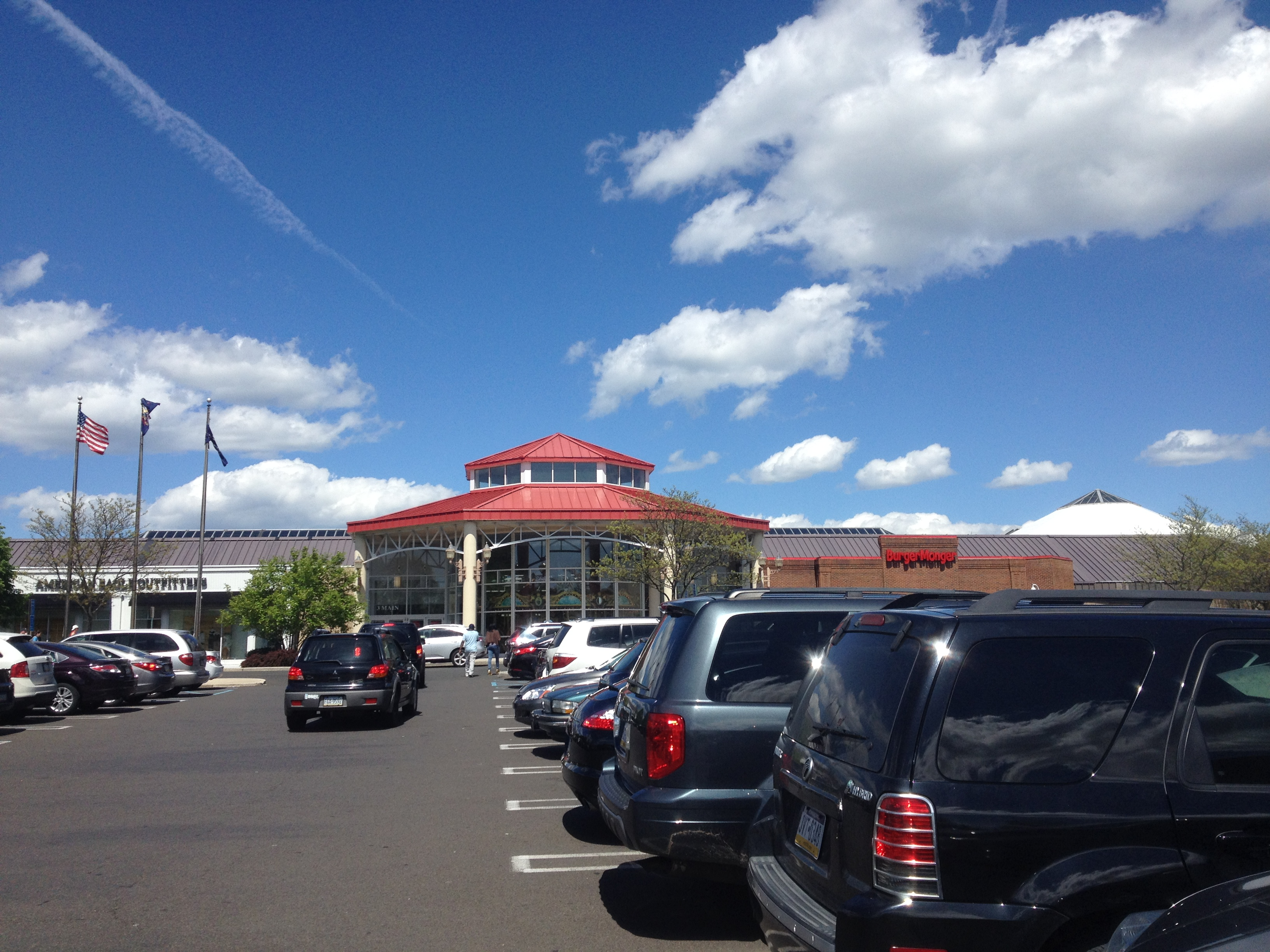
The Willow Grove Park Mall is located in Abington Township

The economy of the township includes manufacturing of pressed steel, chemicals, and metal and plastic products.

=== Top employers ===
According to Abington Township's 2023 Annual Comprehensive Financial Report, the top employers in the township are:

| # | Employer | # of Employees | Community |
|---|---|---|---|
| 1 | Jefferson Abington Hospital | 4,163 | Abington |
| 2 | Holy Redeemer Health System | 2,129 | Huntingdon Valley |
| 3 | Willow Grove Park Mall | 2,099 | Willow Grove |
| 4 | Abington School District | 1,154 | Abington |
| 5 | SarahCare | 1,087 | Jenkintown (mailing address) |
| 6 | Penn State Abington | 696 | Abington |
| 7 | SPS Technologies | 574 | Abington |
| 8 | Abington Township | 561 | Abington |
| 9 | Philadelphia Presbyterian Home | 402 | |
| 10 | The Giant Company | 362 | Roslyn and Huntingdon Valley |

== Parks and recreation ==
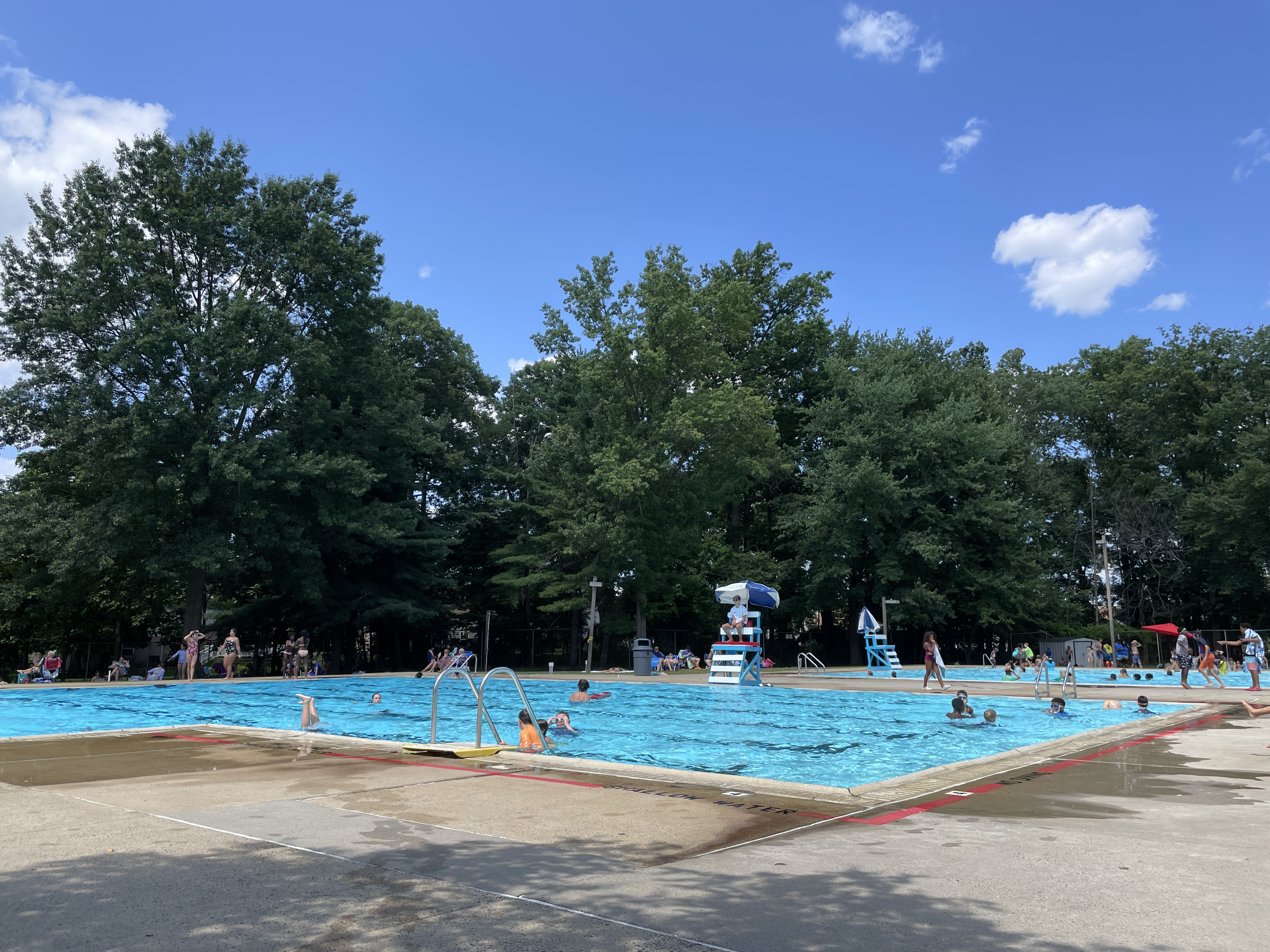
Crestmont Pool

The Abington Township Parks and Recreation Department controls over 20 parks located within the township. Alverthorpe Park is only open to township residents and guests of township residents and contains sports fields, trails, picnic areas, a playground, a lake, camping, a par-3 golf course, and mini-golf. Other parks and natural areas in the township include Ardsley Community Center, Ardsley Park, Ardsley Wildlife Sanctuary, Briar Bush Nature Center, Crestmont Park, Crosswicks Bird Sanctuary, Edge Hill Woods Wildlife Sanctuary, Karebrook Nature Area, Lorimer Park, Meadowbrook Bird Sanctuary, Patrick Kerr Memorial Skate Park, Penbryn Park, and several others. The township has two public swimming pools: Crestmont Pool and Penbryn Pool. The Abington Township Parks and Recreation Department also offers discount tickets to amusement parks, aquariums, zoos, ski resorts, movies, museums, and water parks.

== Infrastructure ==
=== Transportation ===
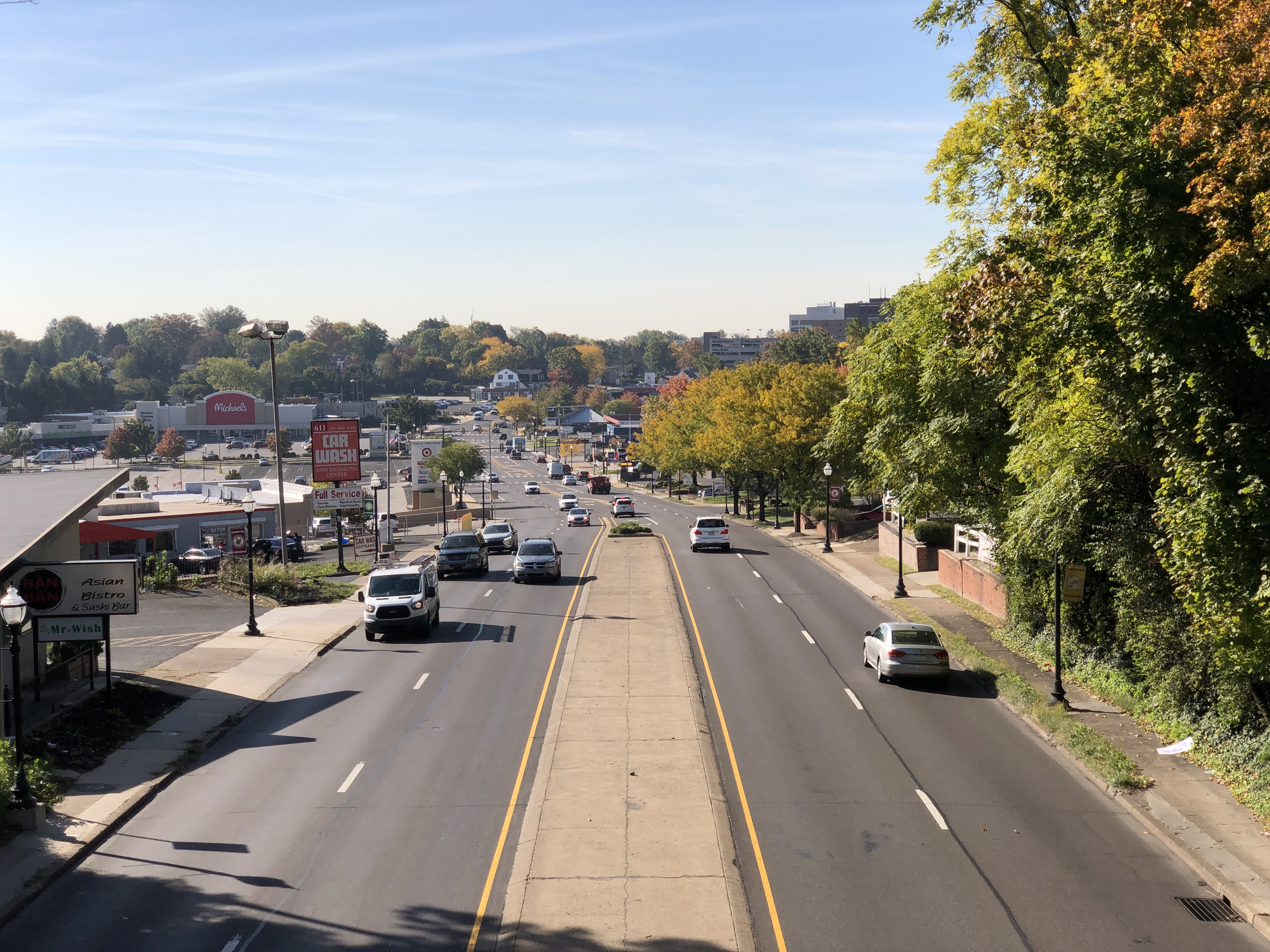
PA 611 southbound in Abington Township

As of 2018 there were 211.99 miles (341.16 km) of public roads in Abington Township, of which 29.35 miles (47.23 km) were maintained by the Pennsylvania Department of Transportation (PennDOT) and 182.64 miles (293.93 km) were maintained by the township.

Numbered routes serving Abington Township include Pennsylvania Route 611, which passes north–south through the center of the township on Old York Road between Jenkintown and Willow Grove; Pennsylvania Route 63, which passes northwest–southeast through the northern part of the township in the Willow Grove area along Moreland Road (following the border with Upper Moreland Township), Edge Hill Road, and Old Welsh Road; Pennsylvania Route 73; which runs northwest–southeast atop the southern border with Cheltenham Township along Township Line Road between Jenkintown and Northeast Philadelphia; Pennsylvania Route 152, which passes north–south through the western part of the township along Limekiln Pike; and Pennsylvania Route 232; which passes north–south through the eastern part of the township along Huntingdon Pike between Rockledge and Huntingdon Valley. Other important roads in Abington Township include Easton Road, which runs southwest–northeast through the western part of the township between Glenside and Willow Grove; Susquehanna Road, which runs northwest–southeast through the center of the township between Roslyn and Huntingdon Valley; and Jenkintown Road, which runs northwest–southeast through the southern part of the township between Ardsley and Elkins Park, passing through Jenkintown along the way. Abington Township is one of twelve municipalities in Pennsylvania to have red light cameras, which are aimed at improving safety at dangerous intersections. Red light cameras are located at Old York Road and Susquehanna Road (all directions), Old York Road and Old Welsh Road (all directions), and Moreland Road and Fitzwatertown Road (eastbound Moreland Road and northbound Fitzwatertown Road).

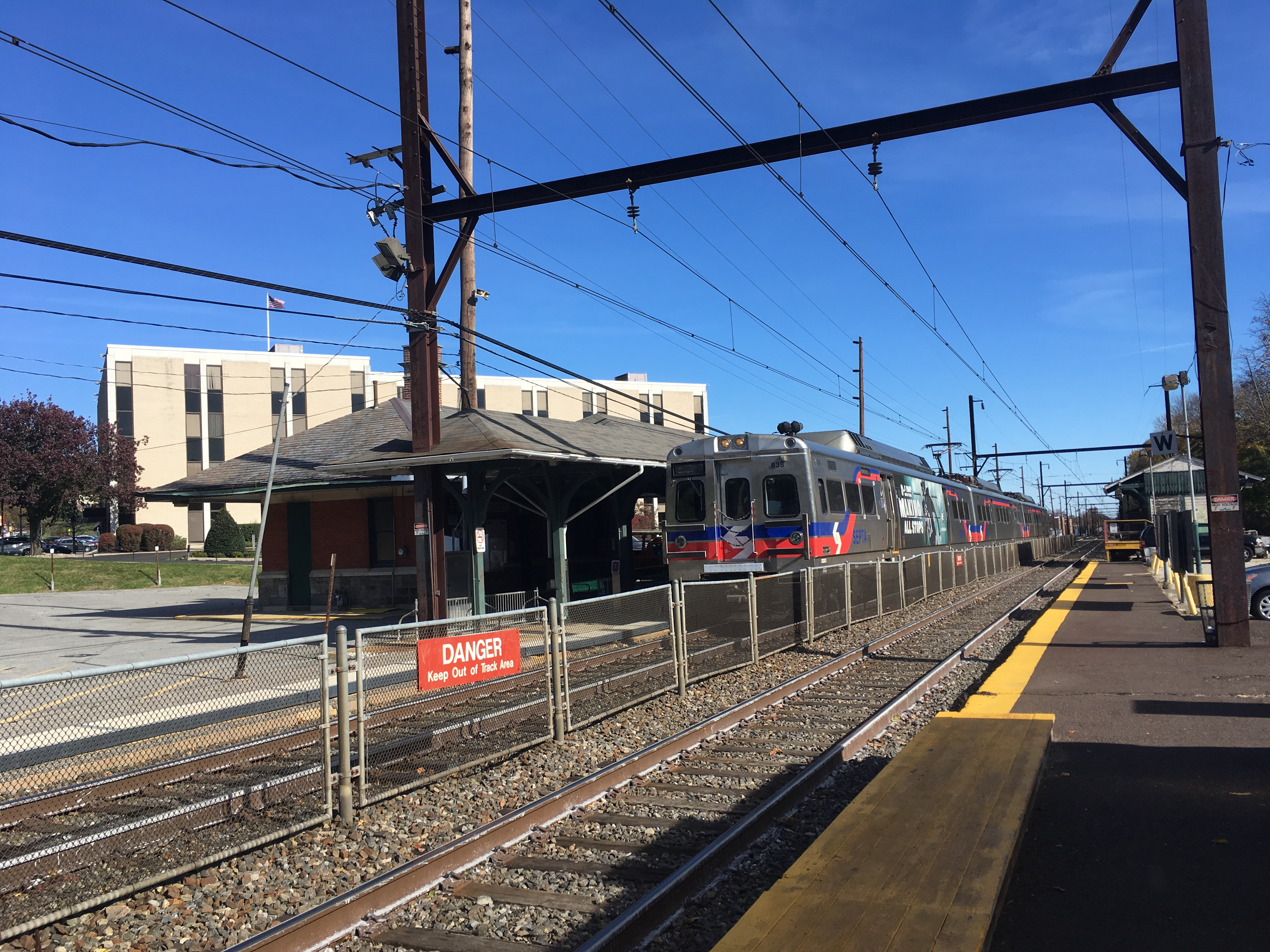
A SEPTA Regional Rail train on the West Trenton Line stops at the Noble station in Abington Township

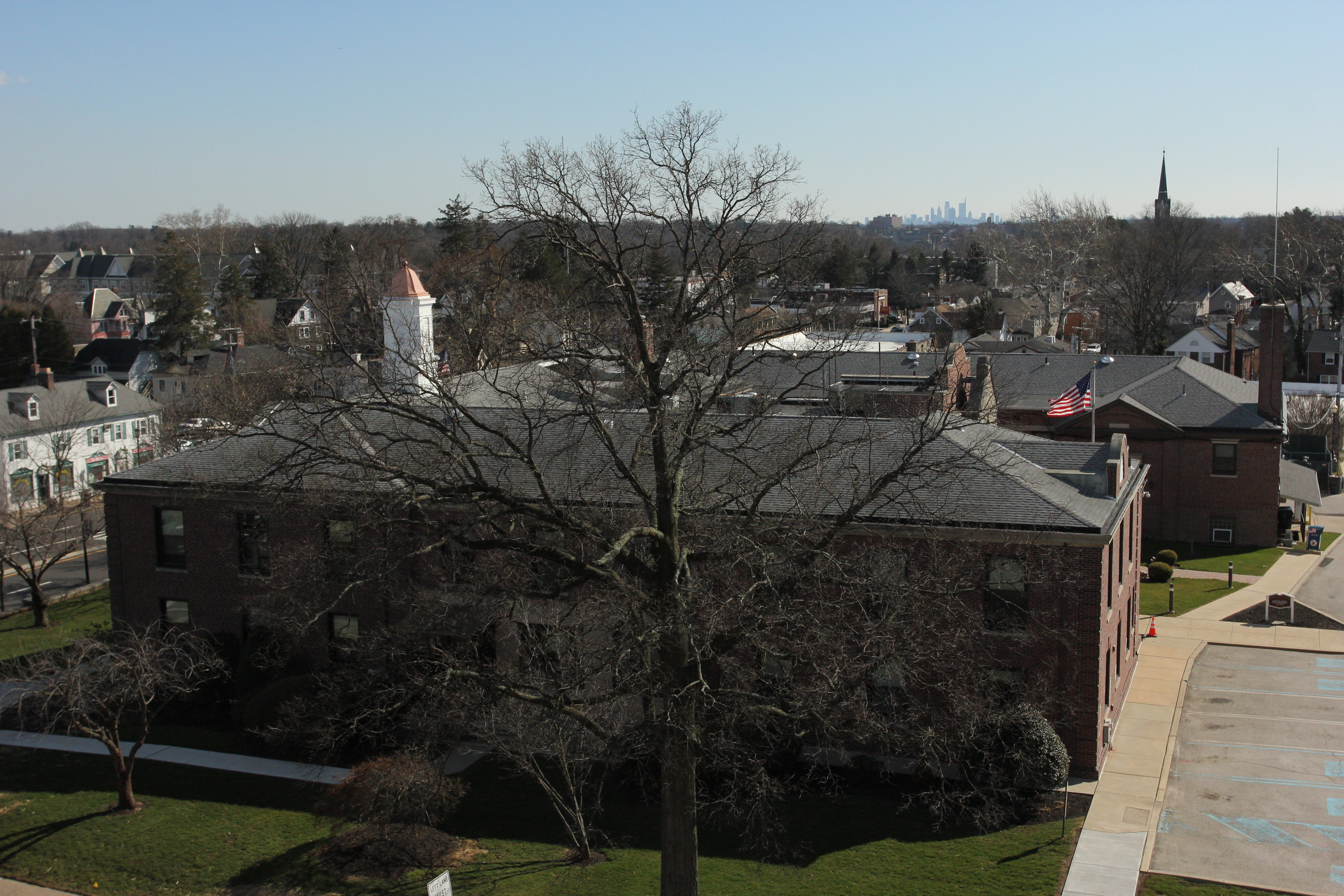
Abington Township Building and Police Headquarters, with Center City Philadelphia in the background.

Several SEPTA Regional Rail stations are located in Abington Township, providing commuter rail service to Center City Philadelphia. The Lansdale/Doylestown Line stops at the North Hills station, the Warminster Line stops at Crestmont, Roslyn, and Ardsley stations, and the West Trenton Line stops at Meadowbrook, Rydal, and Noble stations. The Glenside station serving the Lansdale/Doylestown Line and Warminster Line is located just outside the township's borders in Cheltenham Township. SEPTA provides bus service to Abington Township along City Bus Routes 22, 24, 28, 55, 77, 88, and 310 and Suburban Bus Route 95, serving area shopping centers, hospitals, and employers, along with offering connections to Philadelphia and other suburbs.

=== Utilities ===
Electricity and natural gas in Abington Township is provided by PECO Energy Company, a subsidiary of Exelon. Water in Abington Township is provided by Aqua Pennsylvania, a subsidiary of Aqua America. Sewer service is provided by the township's Wastewater Utilities Department, with wastewater treated either at the Abington Wastewater Treatment Plant or the Philadelphia Northeast Treatment Plant. Trash and recycling collection is provided by the township's Refuse/Recycling Department. Cable, telephone, and internet service to the area is provided by Xfinity and Verizon. Abington Township is served by area codes 215, 267, and 445.

=== Health care ===
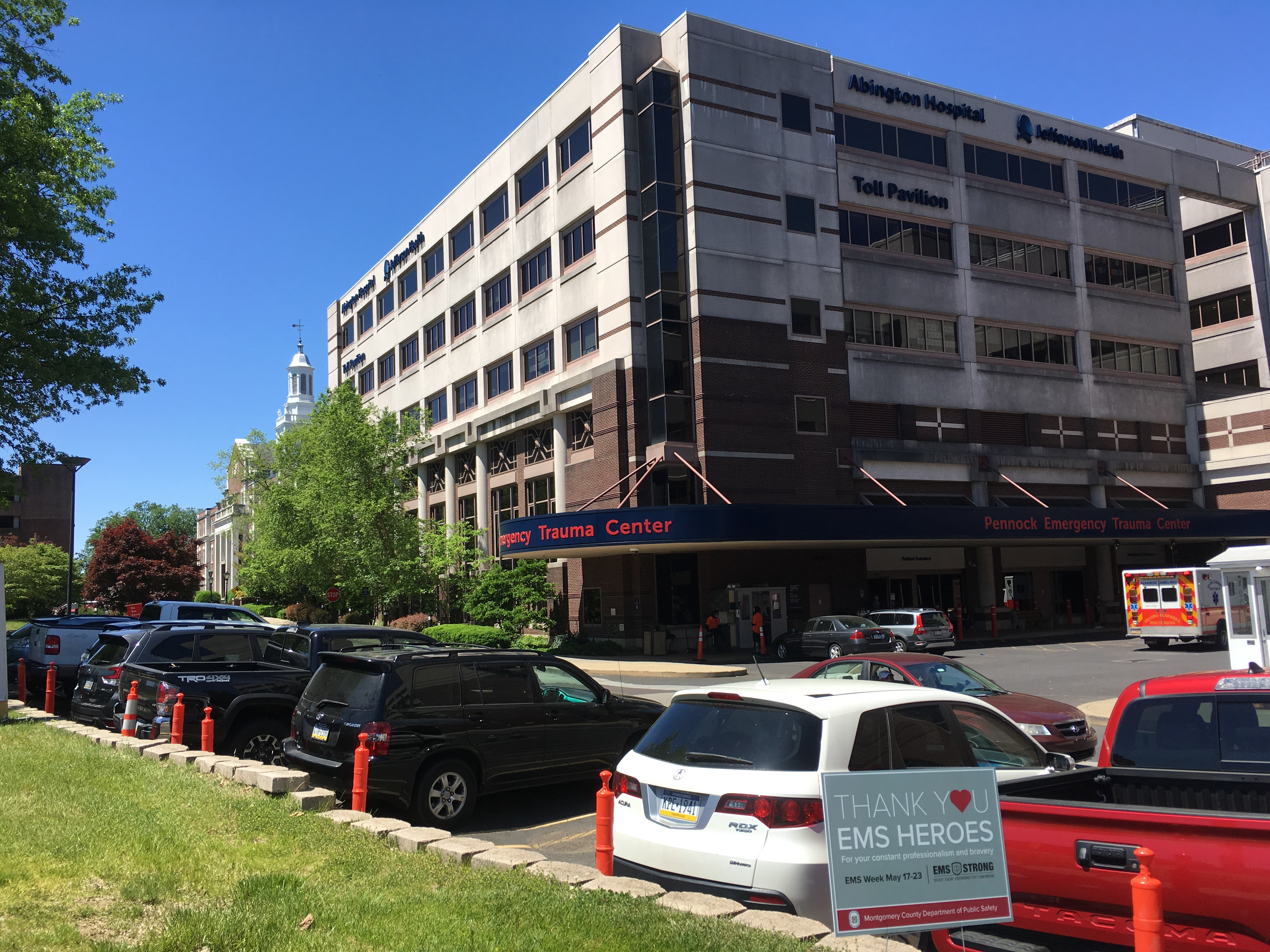
Jefferson Abington Hospital

Jefferson Abington Hospital and Holy Redeemer Hospital are both located in Abington Township. Jefferson Abington Hospital, located along Old York Road in the Abington section of the township, has 665 beds and over 5,500 employees, including more than 1,100 physicians, and is one of the largest employers in Montgomery County. It has the Pennock Emergency Trauma Center, an emergency room with the only Level II trauma center in Montgomery County. Other services offered at Jefferson Abington Hospital include The Heart and Vascular Institute, The Sidney Kimmel Cancer Center at Jefferson Health-Abington, Neurosciences Institute, Orthopaedic and Spine Institute, Diamond Stroke Center, Muller Institute for Senior Health, and the Institute for Metabolic and Bariatric Surgery. Jefferson Abington Hospital is a non-profit, regional referral center and teaching hospital with five residency programs and operates the Dixon School of Nursing. Holy Redeemer Hospital, located along Huntingdon Pike in the Meadowbrook section of the township, has 242 beds and employs over 500 physicians. Services offered at Holy Redeemer Hospital include an Ambulatory Surgery Center, a Cardiovascular Center, The Bott Cancer Center, Orthopaedics, Emergency Department, and Wound Care Center.

== Education ==
=== Public schools ===
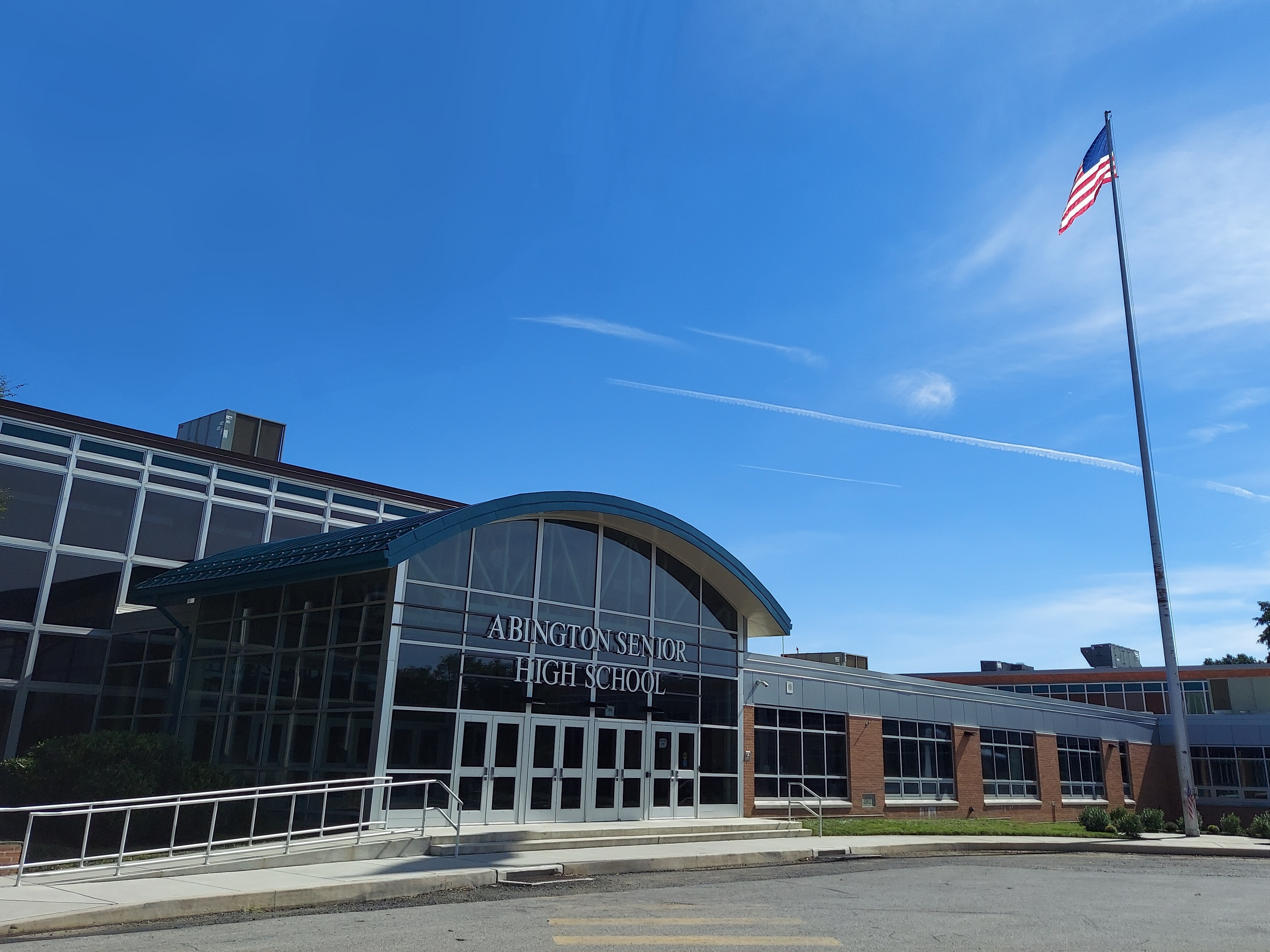
Abington Senior High School

Abington is served by the Abington School District. There are seven elementary schools in this township, which include:

- Copper Beech (1,156 students)
- McKinley (754)
- Rydal (636)
- Highland (500)
- Overlook (587)
- Roslyn (511)
- Willow Hill (425)

The middle school (grades 6–8) is Abington Middle School (formerly the Abington Junior High School, grades 7-9) and the senior high (grades 9–12) is Abington Senior High School (formerly grades 10-12).

There are several private schools located inside the township, such as Meadowbrook and Abington Friends School. Penn State's Abington campus is located in the Rydal section of the township.

The school district received some notoriety in the 1960s when it became one of the key parties in the school prayer controversy, with Abington School District v. Schempp. The Supreme Court case resulted in a declaration of the unconstitutionality of school-sanctioned Bible reading.

The elementary schools, junior high school, and senior high school in Abington School District have recently undergone a series of renovations and rebuilding, resulting in more up-to-date and sophisticated structures.

Area Catholic schools include Saint Luke Catholic School in Glenside and Abington Township, Queen of Angels Regional Catholic School in Willow Grove and Upper Moreland Township, and Good Shepherd Regional Catholic School in Ardsley and Upper Dublin Township. Queen of Angels was formed in 2012 by the merger of Our Lady Help of Christians in Abington and St. David in Willow Grove, while Good Shepherd was formed after the merger of parish schools at Queen of Peace in Ardsley and St. John of the Cross in Roslyn in 2010. Private Catholic schools in the area include Regina Coeli Academy in Abington, Ancillae-Assumpta Academy in Wyncote, and Martin Saints Classical High School in Oreland.

Pennsylvania State University opened the Ogontz Campus in 1950, which was renamed to Penn State Abington.

Manor College is in the township, with a Jenkintown mailing address.

== Organizations ==
The American Anti-Vivisection Society (AVVS) is headquartered in the township.

== Notable people ==
- Polly Apfelbaum – visual artist
- Gail Berman – former president of entertainment at Fox Broadcasting Company and former president of Viacom's Paramount Pictures
- Amar Gopal Bose – MIT professor and founder of the audio company Bose Corporation
- David Brumbaugh – former Oklahoma state legislator
- Michael Buffer – ring announcer
- Ashton Carter – physicist, Harvard University professor, and former United States Secretary of Defense
- Bruce Castor – attorney, former District Attorney of Montgomery County, and former Acting Attorney General of Pennsylvania
- Bradley Cooper – actor
- Madeleine Dean – current U.S. Representative from Pennsylvania
- Krista Errickson – actress
- Maddy Evans – retired National Women's Soccer League midfielder and defender
- Tom Feeney – former U.S. Representative from Florida
- Risa Vetri Ferman - Judge of the Court of Common Pleas and former District Attorney of Montgomery County, Pennsylvania
- Jon D. Fox – former U.S. Representative from Pennsylvania
- Matthew Fox – actor, famous for his portrayal of "Jack" on Lost
- Jason Garrett – retired NFL quarterback, offensive coordinator of the New York Giants, and former head coach of the Dallas Cowboys
- Eddie George – retired NFL running back
- Drew Gulak – professional wrestler
- Joe Hoeffel – former U.S. Representative from Pennsylvania
- Al Holbert – auto racer in Motorsports Hall of Fame of America
- Reggie Jackson - professional baseball player, Baseball Hall of Fame right fielder of the Oakland Athletics
- Katalin Karikó - Nobel Laureate for developments in mRNA enabling the first COVID-19 vaccine
- Deborah Kaplan – screenwriter and film director
- Bil Keane – cartoonist of The Family Circus; resided in Roslyn with his family from 1948 to 1959
- Chad Kolarik – University of Michigan hockey player, drafted by the Phoenix Coyotes
- William Lashner – novelist
- Andrew Lawrence - actor
- Joey Lawrence – actor
- Matthew Lawrence – actor
- Benjamin Lay – vegetarian animal rights activist, philanthropist, and slavery abolitionist
- Jim Liberman – racing driver
- Stephen Lynch – Tony Award-nominated actor, comedian and musician
- James Morrow – science fiction author, born in the area and alludes to the case in his novel Blameless in Abaddon, whose title community is a parallel of Abington
- Jeff Parke – current Major League Soccer player
- Kyle Pitts – current (as of 2021) NFL tight end, drafted 1st round 4th overall in the 2021 NFL Draft
- Emellia Prokopik, Ukrainian nun.
- Mike Richter – retired NHL goaltender
- Betsy Ross – upholsterer who made the first U.S. flag
- Mike Rossi – DJ and former TV host who cheated in the Lehigh Valley marathon
- Bob Saget – actor and comedian
- Ellery Schempp – physicist; famous for his involvement as a student in Abington School District v. Schempp
- Allyson Schwartz – former U.S. Representative from Pennsylvania
- Stephen A. Schwarzman – chairman, CEO and co-founder of Blackstone Group
- Susan Seidelman – film and television director, Desperately Seeking Susan, Sex And The City
- Josh Shapiro – 48th and current Governor of Pennsylvania
- Ala Stanford – pediatric surgeon and founder of the Black Doctors COVID-19 Consortium
- David Starr – professional wrestler
- Kenny Vasoli – lead singer and bassist of The Starting Line and Vacationer
- Mike Vogel – actor, known for his roles in the films Grind and The Texas Chainsaw Massacre
- ZZ Ward – musician, singer/songwriter
- Danny Woodburn – actor, comedian
- Shawn Wooden – retired NFL safety for the Miami Dolphins

| Preceded by Cheltenham Township | Bordering communities of Philadelphia; With: Rockledge | Succeeded by Lower Moreland |
