= David Christiana =

American writer

David Christiana is an American artist. He was born in Huntington, New York, has illustrated more than twenty picture books for children and authored four for international publishers such as Farrar, Straus & Giroux; Harcourt Brace; Little, Brown; Henry Holt; and Scholastic. Reviews of his work have appeared in The New York Times Book Review, People Magazine, Publishers Weekly.

== Novels ==
- Drawer in a Drawer (1990)
- White Nineteens (1992)
- A Tooth Fairy's Tale (1994)
- The First Snow (1996)
