= Abington Township High School =

- U.S. National Register of Historic Places
- U.S. Historic district
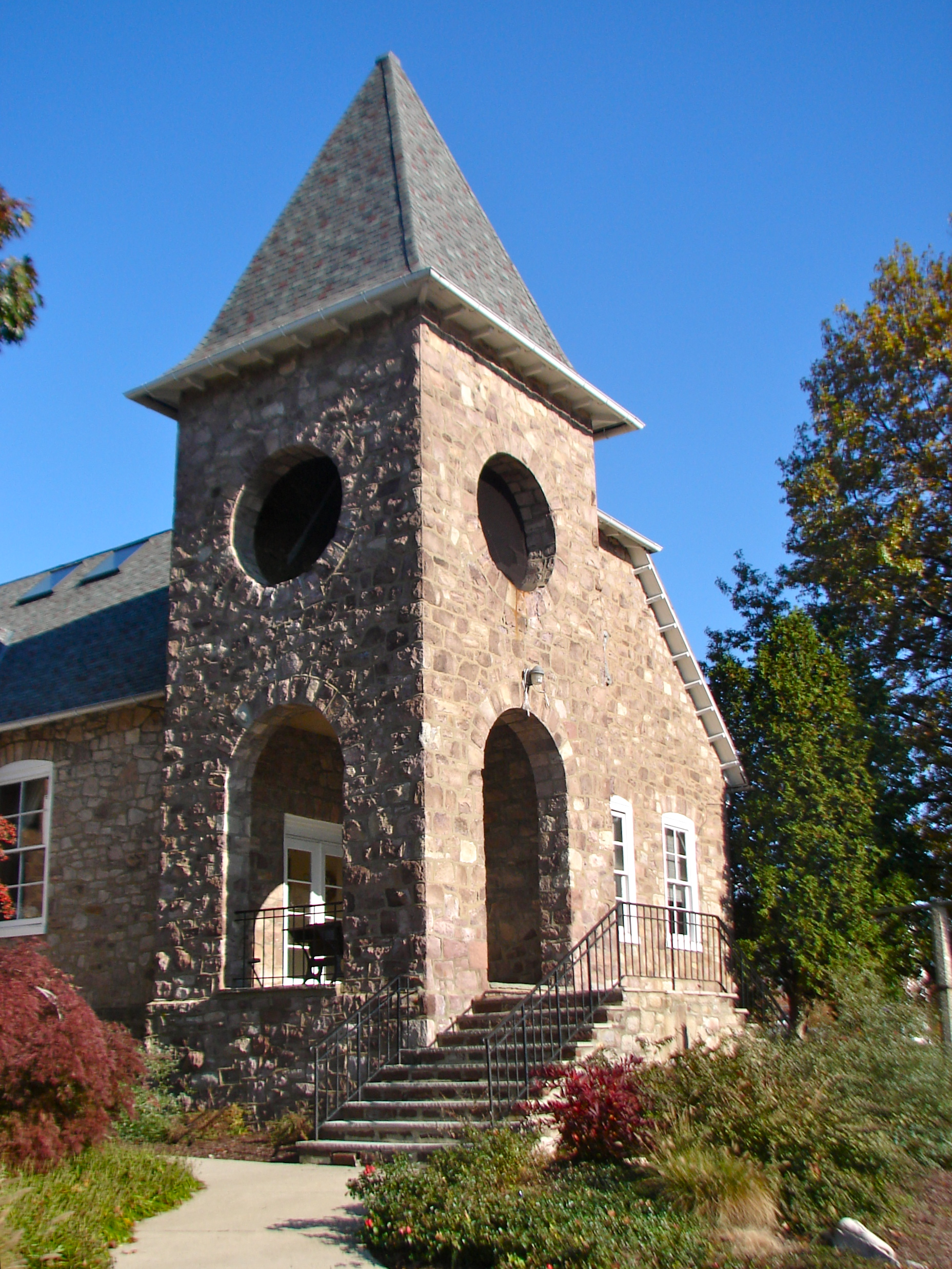
- Abington Township High School in Abington, Pennsylvania

- Location within Pennsylvania Location within the United States
- Location: 1801 Susquehanna Rd., Abington, Pennsylvania
- Coordinates: 40°6′51″N 75°7′13.7″W
- Area: 5 acres (2.0 ha)
- Architect: Multiple
- Architectural style: Art Deco, Queen Anne, Romanesque
- NRHP reference No.: 85001676
- Added to NRHP: August 2, 1985

The Abington Township High School was a complex of educational buildings at 1801 Susquehanna Road in Abington Township, Pennsylvania. The 5-acre (2.0 ha) property included a number of buildings, including the township's first purpose-built school building. Buildings in the complex served as a high school, junior high school, and school administration facility. All but the oldest building were demolished in 1996, replaced by a senior living facility. The complex was listed on the National Register of Historic Places in 1985.

== See also ==
- National Register of Historic Places listings in Montgomery County, Pennsylvania
