= Abington School District =

School district in Pennsylvania, United States

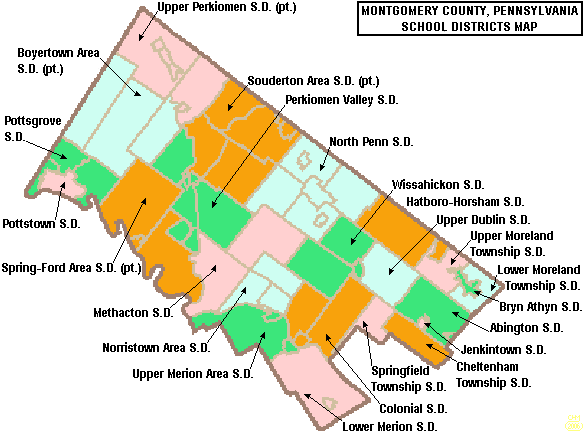

Address
- 970 Highland Avenue Abington, Pennsylvania, 19001; United States
- Coordinates: 40.112°N 75.128°W

District information
- Type: Public school district
- Grades: K-12
- President: Shameeka Brown
- Superintendent: Dr. Jeffery S. Fecher
- NCES District ID: 4202040

Students and staff
- Enrollment: 8,543
- Teachers: 592
- Staff: 622
- Student–teacher ratio: 14.4:1
- District mascot: Galloping Ghosts
- Colors: Maroon and White

Other information
- Website: www.abingtonsd.org

Abington School District is a medium-sized, suburban, public school district that serves the borough of Rockledge and Abington Township in Montgomery County, Pennsylvania. The district operates one high school, one middle school, and seven elementary schools.

Abington School District encompasses approximately 16 square miles.

According to 2017-21 ACS-ED data, the district serves a resident population of 60,748. The median household income is $96,510, versus a state median income of $67,587, and national median income of $69,021.

== Secondary schools ==
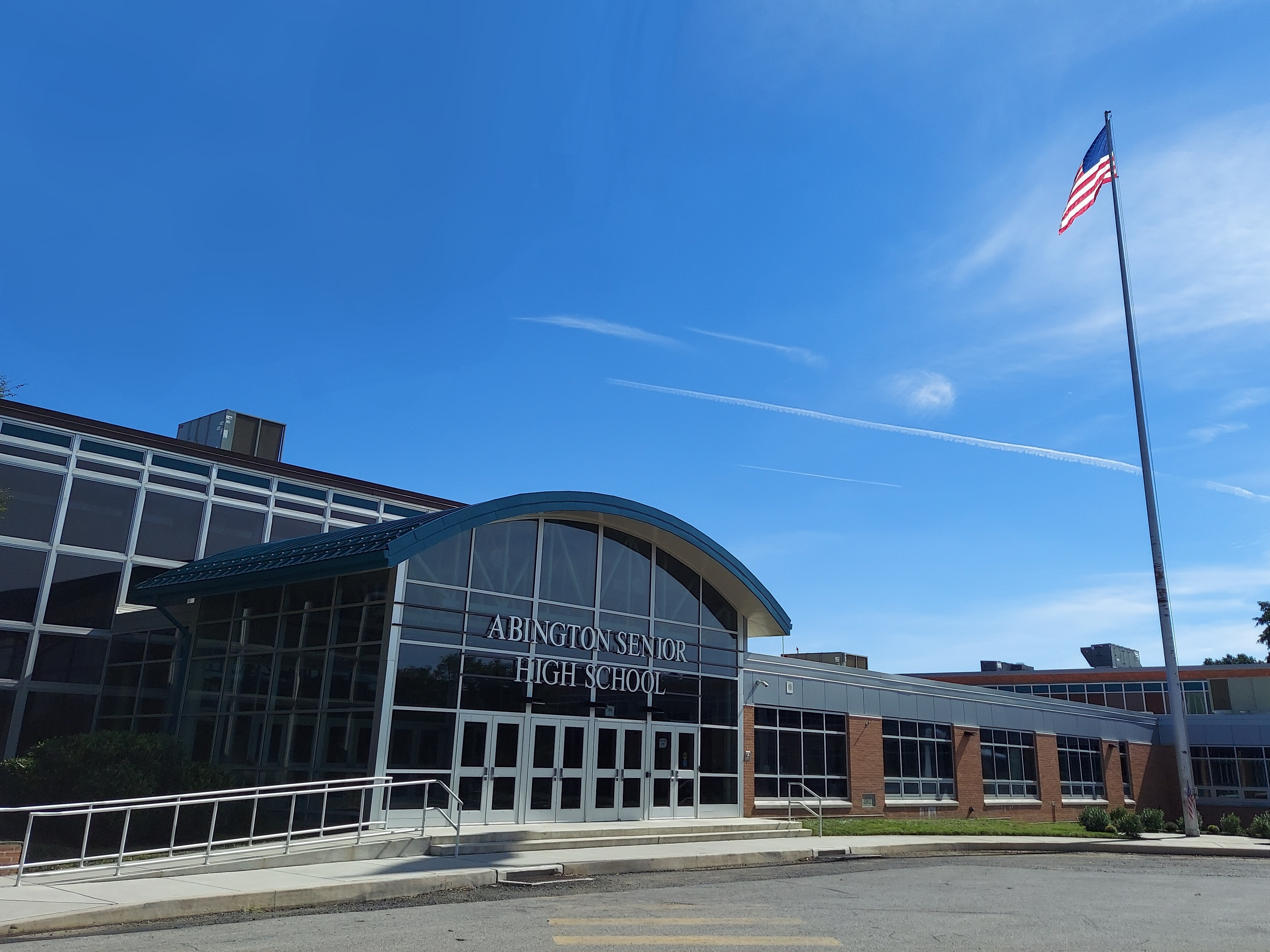
Abington Senior High School

- Abington Senior High (9th, 10th, 11th, 12th)
- Abington Middle School (6th, 7th, 8th)

== Elementary Schools (K-5) ==
- Copper Beech
- Highland
- McKinley
- Overlook
- Roslyn
- Rydal
- Willow Hill

== Abington School District vs. Schempp ==
The school district received some notoriety in the 1960s when it became one of the key parties in the school prayer controversy, with Abington School District v. Schempp. The Supreme Court case resulted in a declaration of the unconstitutionality of school-sanctioned Bible reading. This case is considered a landmark and surprised former president Dwight Eisenhower, who had appointed Earl Warren as chief justice.
