= Jon D. Fox =

American politician

Jon David Fox
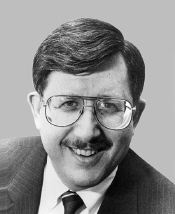

Member of the U.S. House of Representatives from Pennsylvania's 13th district
- In office January 3, 1995 – January 3, 1999
- Preceded by: Marjorie Margolies-Mezvinsky
- Succeeded by: Joe Hoeffel

Member of the Montgomery County Board of Commissioners
- In office January 6, 1992 – January 3, 1995
- Preceded by: Floriana Bloss
- Succeeded by: Richard S. Buckman

Member of the Pennsylvania House of Representatives from the 153rd district
- In office January 1, 1985 – January 16, 1992
- Preceded by: Joe Hoeffel
- Succeeded by: Martin Laub

Personal details
- Born: April 22, 1947 Abington, Pennsylvania, U.S.
- Died: February 11, 2018 (aged 70) Abington, Pennsylvania, U.S.
- Party: Republican
- Spouse: Judi Fox
- Children: Will Fox
- Education: Pennsylvania State University (BA); Widener University (JD)

Jon D. Fox (April 22, 1947 – February 11, 2018) was an American Republican politician. He served as a member of Pennsylvania House of Representatives from 1985 to 1992 before being elected to the Montgomery County Board of Commissioners (1992–1995). His final political role was as a member of the U.S. House of Representatives from Pennsylvania between 1995 and 1999.

== Early life ==
Fox was born in Abington, Pennsylvania. He graduated from Pennsylvania State University in State College, Pennsylvania in 1969, and earned a J.D. from the Delaware School of Law (now Widener University Delaware Law School), in Wilmington, Delaware, in 1975. He served in the United States Air Force Reserve from 1969 to 1975. He held positions with the General Services Administration, and was a guest lecturer for the Presidential Classroom for Young Americans. From 1976 to 1984 he was assistant district attorney for Montgomery County, Pennsylvania.

== Political career ==
Fox made his first successful run at political office in 1984, winning a seat in the Pennsylvania House of Representatives from the Abington area after Democrat Joe Hoeffel retired. He would serve in the House until the 1991 primary election, when he challenged the incumbent GOP commissioners for a seat on the Montgomery County Board of Commissioners. Fox and Mario Mele defeated the incumbents and went on to win the general election. However, Fox, who believed that he would be elected chairman, was surprised when Mele nominated himself for the job, with Hoeffel seconding.

In 1992, he ran unsuccessfully for Congress against Democrat Marjorie Margolies-Mezvinsky, losing by less than 1,400 votes. However, Fox sought a rematch in 1994 and, with Mezvinsky saddled with a controversial vote for a tax increase, Fox became part of the Republican Revolution. Fox was re-elected once, in 1996, defeating Hoeffel by 84 votes out of nearly 250,000 cast. In 1998, three Republicans, Mike McMonagle, Melissa Brown and Jonathan Newman challenged him in the GOP primary. Fox staved off the internal challenge and faced Hoeffel in a rematch for the general election. Fox also faced a backlash after the impeachment of President Clinton; the 13th, long a classic "Yankee Republican" district, had become increasingly friendly to Democrats in the 1990s. In November, Fox was unable to overcome these challenges and lost 51.6%–46.6%. After the election, Fox voted for all four articles of impeachment against Clinton.

In 2004, State Representative Ellen Bard, who held Fox' old state house seat retired to run for Congress, and Fox was persuaded to run for the seat. Fox faced newcomer Josh Shapiro in a district that had become increasingly favorable to Democrats since his original tenure. The electorate of that district had grown significantly more Democratic in the years since his first campaigns, and he was defeated 54.3%–44.7%.

== Personal life ==
Fox lived in Abington with his wife, Judi, with whom he had a son, Will. He was active in the Republican Party as the Area Chairman for Abington Township. He practiced law and also worked as an instructor at Manor College in Jenkintown, Pennsylvania. Fox died on February 11, 2018, of complications with cancer at age 70.

== See also ==
- List of Jewish members of the United States Congress

Pennsylvania House of Representatives
| Preceded by Joe Hoeffel | Member of the Pennsylvania House of Representatives from the 153rd district 1985–1992 | Succeeded by Martin Laub |
Political offices
| Preceded by Floriana Bloss | Member of the Montgomery County Board of Commissioners; 1992–1995 | Succeeded by Richard Buckman |
U.S. House of Representatives
| Preceded by Marjorie Margolies-Mezvinsky | Member of the U.S. House of Representatives from Pennsylvania's 13th congressional district 1995–1999 | Succeeded by Joe Hoeffel |
