= Marjorie Margolies =

American politician (born 1942)

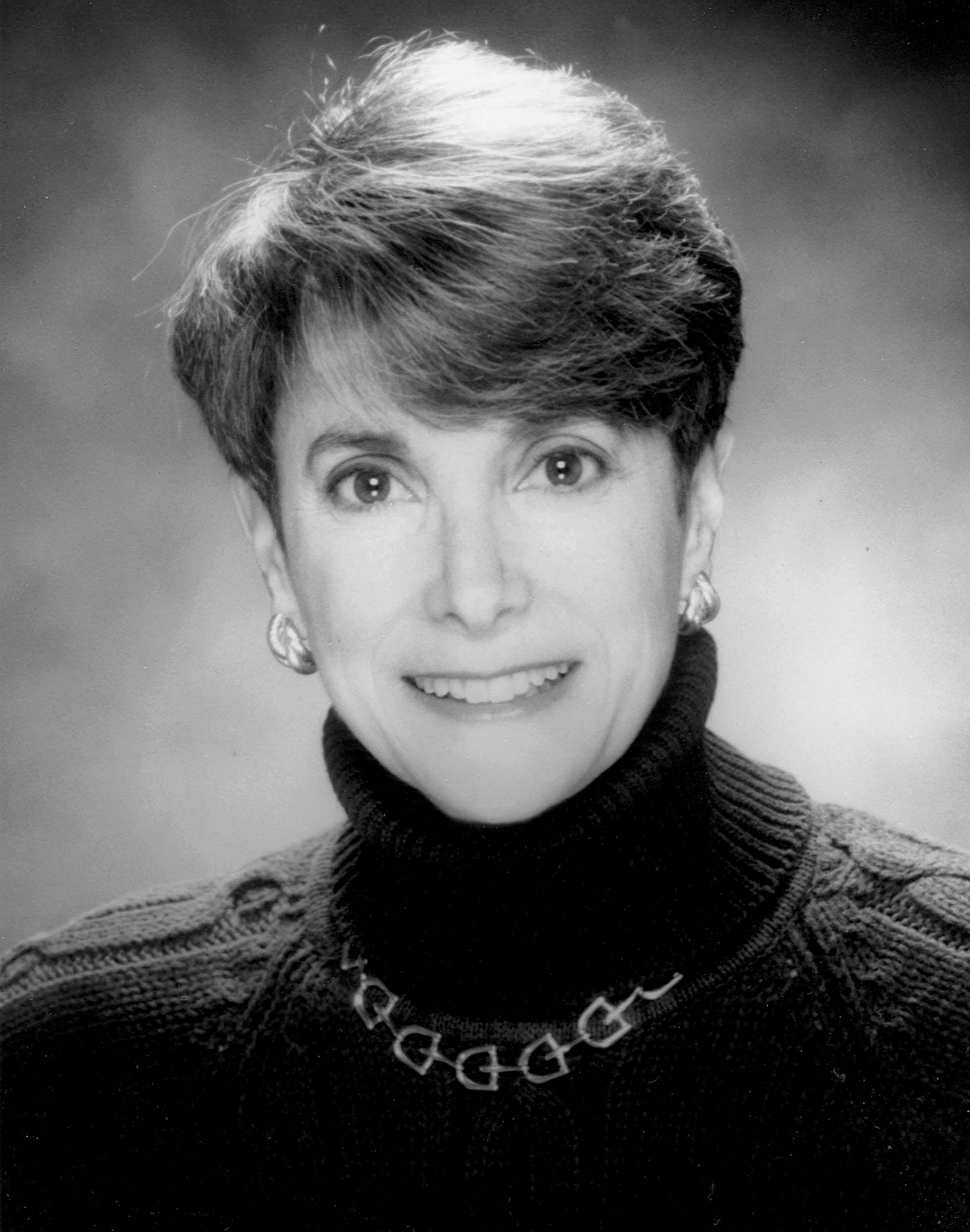

Member of the U.S. House of Representatives from Pennsylvania's 13th district
- In office January 3, 1993 – January 3, 1995
- Preceded by: Lawrence Coughlin
- Succeeded by: Jon D. Fox

Personal details
- Born: Marjorie Sue Margolies; June 21, 1942 (age 84) Philadelphia, Pennsylvania, U.S.
- Party: Democratic
- Spouse: Edward Mezvinsky (m. 1975; div. 2007)
- Children: 7, including Marc
- Relatives: Chelsea Clinton (daughter-in-law)
- Education: University of Pennsylvania (BA)
- Website: Official website

Marjorie Sue Margolies (/mɑːrˈɡoʊliːz/ mar-GOH-leez; formerly Margolies-Mezvinsky; born June 21, 1942) is a former journalist and a Democratic politician. From 1993 to 1995, she was a member of the U.S. House of Representatives, representing Pennsylvania's 13th congressional district.

Margolies cast the deciding vote in favor of President Bill Clinton's 1993 budget proposal.

== Early life, education, and journalism career ==
Margolies was born in Philadelphia. She graduated from the University of Pennsylvania in 1963. She was a broadcast journalist for over twenty-four years, winning five Emmy Awards for her work. She worked as a television journalist at WCAU-TV from 1967 to 1969, was a CBS News Foundation Fellow, Columbia University from 1969 to 1970, and then worked for WRC-TV from 1975 until 1990. She was also a correspondent for the Today Show.

== U.S. House of Representatives ==
=== Elections ===
In 1992 she ran for an open seat in Congress for Pennsylvania's 13th congressional district, a largely suburban district outside Philadelphia which Republicans had held since 1916. She defeated Bernard Tomkin in the Democratic primary, 79%-21%. In the general election, she defeated Republican State Representative Jon D. Fox by a margin of 0.5%, or a difference of 1,373 votes.

In 1994, she lost re-election to Fox in a rematch, 49%-45%, a difference of 8,181 votes. She was one of 54 Democratic incumbents who were defeated in the Republican Revolution.

=== Tenure ===
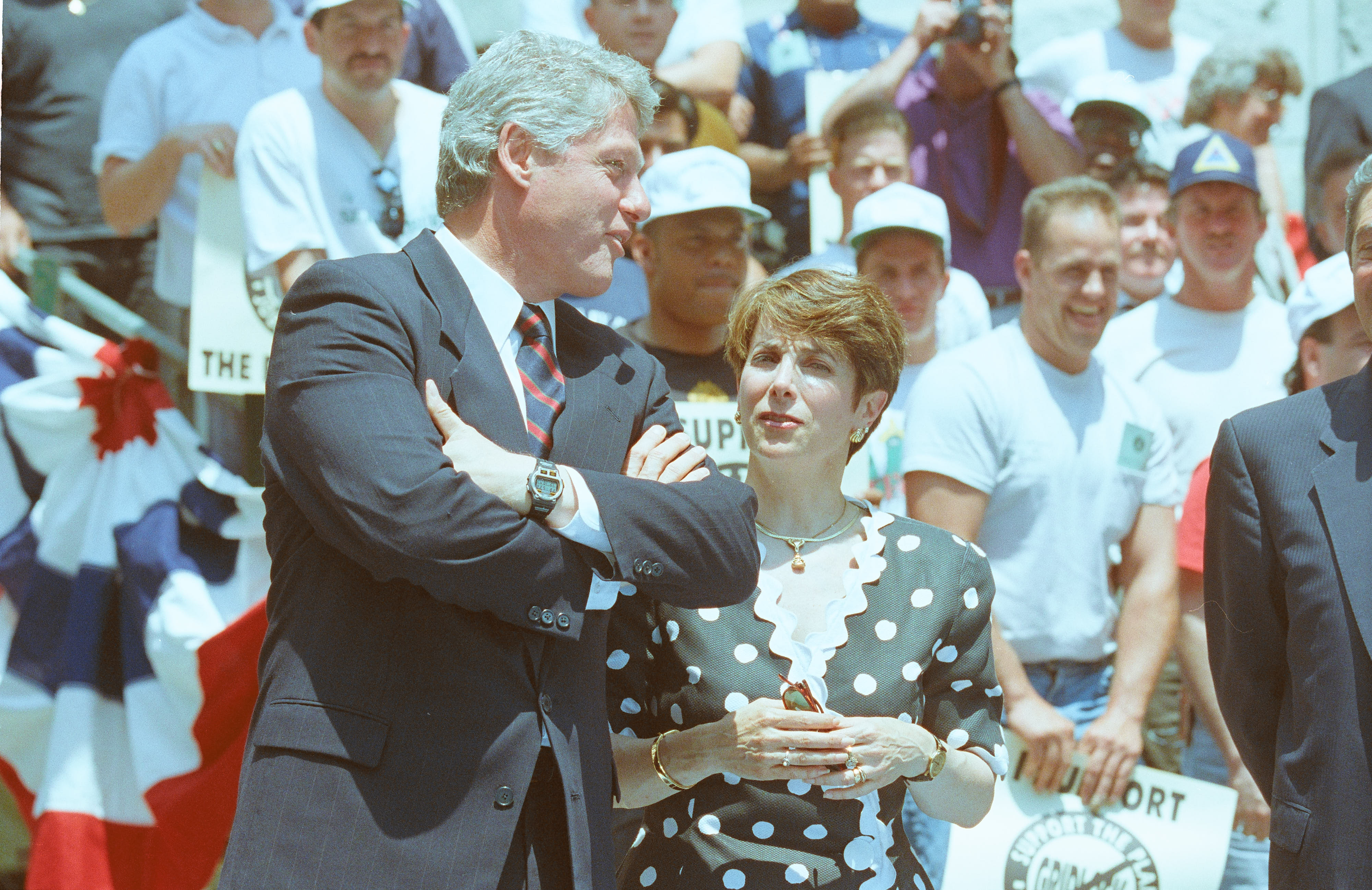
Margolies with President Bill Clinton in Philadelphia, May 1993

Margolies served on the bipartisan Deficit Reduction Task Force. In 1994, she completed A Woman's Place, a book with the other women in the class of 1992.

Many of her votes cost her re-election bid in 1994. One vote was for President Bill Clinton's controversial 1993 budget, for which she was the deciding vote. She had opposed the bill, until the President called her. House Democrats cheered as the House Republicans jeered, "Goodbye Marjorie!" In a 2009 interview with The Daily Beast, she recalled U.S. Congressman Robert Walker (R-Pennsylvania) in particular joining in the Republican jeers. She also recalled the ire of her constituents resulting from her vote, saying "when I went to town-hall meetings, I had to be escorted by the police....I was just surprised at the level of divisiveness and immaturity."

After a health care reform bill passed the House in November 2009, the conservative Americans for Tax Reform featured her 1994 defeat as an example of what could occur in the 2010 midterm elections because of one particular vote to those Democrats in swing districts who voted in favor of that health care reform bill. Margolies, however, wrote in The Washington Post that she was glad that she had cast her vote as she had, and urged vulnerable Democrats in Congress to vote for the healthcare bill in March 2010.

== Political activism ==
After her term in Congress, Margolies was the chair of the National Women's Business Council, and the director and deputy chair of the United States delegation to the United Nations Fourth World Conference on Women in 1995.

Margolies serves as the founder and chair of Women's Campaign International (WCI), a group that provides advocacy training for women throughout the world. She is also an adjunct professor at the Fels Institute of Government at the University of Pennsylvania. In addition, she sits on the board of directors of the Committee for a Responsible Federal Budget.

== Political campaigns ==
=== 1998 gubernatorial election ===
In 1998, Margolies ran for Lieutenant Governor of Pennsylvania. She won the Democratic primary election with 53% of the vote, defeating two other candidates. She became the running mate for State Representative Ivan Itkin. The ticket lost to Republicans Tom Ridge and Mark Schweiker, 57%-31%.

=== 2000 congressional election and bankruptcy ===
In 2000, Margolies decided to run for U.S. Senate for the seat held by Republican Rick Santorum. Ultimately, she withdrew from the race after experiencing disappointing fundraising results; in addition, her mother was ill and her husband had legal troubles that resulted in several convictions for fraud. Shortly thereafter, she filed for bankruptcy, but failed to receive a discharge from her debts, based on 11 U.S.C. §727(a)(5). The court found Mezvinsky had failed to satisfactorily explain a significant loss of assets in the four years prior to her bankruptcy filing. The bankruptcy judge stated, in her published opinion, "I find that the Debtor has failed to satisfactorily explain the loss of approximately $775,000 worth of assets (the difference between the $810,000 represented in May 1996 and the $35,000 now claimed in her Amended Schedule B)." Sonders v. Mezvinsky (in re Mezvinsky), 265 B.R. 681, 694 (Bankr. E.D. Pa. 2001).

=== 2014 congressional election ===
In May 2013, Margolies filed paperwork to run in the Democratic congressional primary in her former district in 2014. She ran to replace Rep. Allyson Schwartz (D-Penn.), who ran for Governor of Pennsylvania in 2014. The other Democrats in the race were state Rep. Brendan Boyle of Northeast Philadelphia; state Senator Daylin Leach of Montgomery County; and Dr. Valerie Arkoosh, a professor at the University of Pennsylvania School of Medicine. State Rep. Mark B. Cohen of Philadelphia and former City Controller Jonathan Saidel filed to run, but later withdrew.

On May 17, 2014, Hillary Clinton held her first fundraiser of the year for Margolies's congressional campaign.

On May 20, 2014, Margolies lost the primary election to Boyle.

== Personal life ==
Margolies married Edward Mezvinsky of Iowa in 1975; they divorced in 2007. During their marriage, she was known as Marjorie Margolies-Mezvinsky. They had 11 children altogether, four from his first marriage, two she adopted on her own, two sons they had together, and three children they adopted together. In 1970, Margolies adopted a daughter from Korea; this was reportedly the first time an unmarried American woman had adopted a foreign child. From their 11 children, the Mezvinskys have 18 grandchildren as of 2014.

Marc Mezvinsky, one of Margolies's sons with Edward Mezvinsky, married Chelsea Clinton, the daughter of former U.S. President Bill Clinton and former U.S. Secretary of State Hillary Clinton. The wedding took place on July 31, 2010, in Rhinebeck, New York.

== Works ==
- They Came to Stay, Coward, McCann & Geoghegan, 1976
- Finding someone to love, Playboy Press Paperbacks, 1980, ISBN 978-0-87216-650-9
- The Girls in the Newsroom, Charter Communications, Inc., 1983, ISBN 978-0-441-28929-5
- A woman's place: the freshman women who changed the face of Congress, Marjorie Margolies-Mezvinsky, Barbara Feinman, Crown Publishers, 1994, ISBN 978-0-517-59713-2
- And How Are the Children? Timeless Lessons from the Frontlines of Motherhood (memoir), Wyatt-MacKenzie Publishing, 2021, ISBN 9781954332355

== See also ==
- List of Jewish members of the United States Congress
- Women in the United States House of Representatives

U.S. House of Representatives
Preceded by Lawrence Coughlin	Member of the U.S. House of Representatives from Pennsylvania's 13th congressional district 1993–1995	Succeeded by Jon Fox
Party political offices
Preceded by Tom Foley	Democratic nominee for Lieutenant Governor of Pennsylvania; 1998	Succeeded by Catherine Baker Knoll
U.S. order of precedence (ceremonial)
Preceded by James K. Coyne III as Former U.S. Representative	Order of precedence of the United States as Former U.S. Representative	Succeeded by Kathy Dahlkemper as Former U.S. Representative
