= Elena Rios =

American physician (born 1955)

- Born: Elena V. Rios; 1955 (age 70–71); Los Angeles, California
- Education: Stanford University; University of California, Los Angeles School of Medicine
- Occupation: Physician
- Years active: 1989–present
- Website: elenariosmd.com

Elena V. Rios (born 1955) is an American physician and public health advocate. She served as the president and chief executive officer (CEO) of the National Hispanic Medical Association until June 1, 2024. She currently is president of the National Hispanic Health Foundation, focusing on leadership development, education and research.

== Early life and education ==
Rios was born in 1955 in Los Angeles, California. She attended Stanford University, where she studied human biology and public administration, and founded a recruitment program for minority students. Later, she earned an M.S.P.H. in health planning and policy analysis and a Doctor of Medicine from the UCLA School of Medicine. She completed her residency in internal medicine at Santa Clara Valley Medical Center in San Jose and White Memorial Medical Center in East Los Angeles in 1990. In 1992, she finished her NRSA Primary Care Research Fellowship at the UCLA Division of General Internal Medicine.

== Career ==
In 1989, Rios founded the National Network of Latin American Medical Students and played a pivotal role in establishing the National Hispanic Medical Association in 1994, and serving as its president until June 1, 2024. She also served as a president of the Chicano/Latino Medical Association of California.

In 1993, Rios was appointed Coordinator of Outreach Groups for the White House National Health Care Reform Task Force. From 1992 to 1994, she worked as a policy researcher for the California Office of Statewide Health Planning and Development.

Rios served as Advisor for Regional and Minority Women's Health at the U.S. Department of Health and Human Services Office on Women's Health from 1994 to 1998, and as executive director of Hispanic Serving Health Professions Schools from 1998 to 2004.

Rios is a member of several boards and committees, including the Better Medicare Alliance, National Hispanic Leadership Agenda, NIH Advisory Committee for Research on Women's Health, VA Academic Affiliates Advisory Committee, Centene Health Policy Advisory Committee, and the Cancer Treatment Centers of America Hispanic Advisory Council. She has been involved with organizations including the American College of Physicians, the New York Academy of Medicine, and the Society of Medical Administrators.

== Recognition ==
Rios has received several awards, including the American Association of Indian Physicians Appreciation Award in 1995 and the U.S. Department of Health and Human Services Office of Minority Health Award in 1998. She was also recognized as one of the 100 Most Influential Hispanics by Hispanic Business Magazine in 2001. In 2006, Stanford University inducted her into the Minority Alumni Hall of Fame. She was named a Fellow of the New York Academy of Medicine in 2007 and of the American College of Physicians in 2016.
