= Joe Hoeffel =

American politician (born 1950)

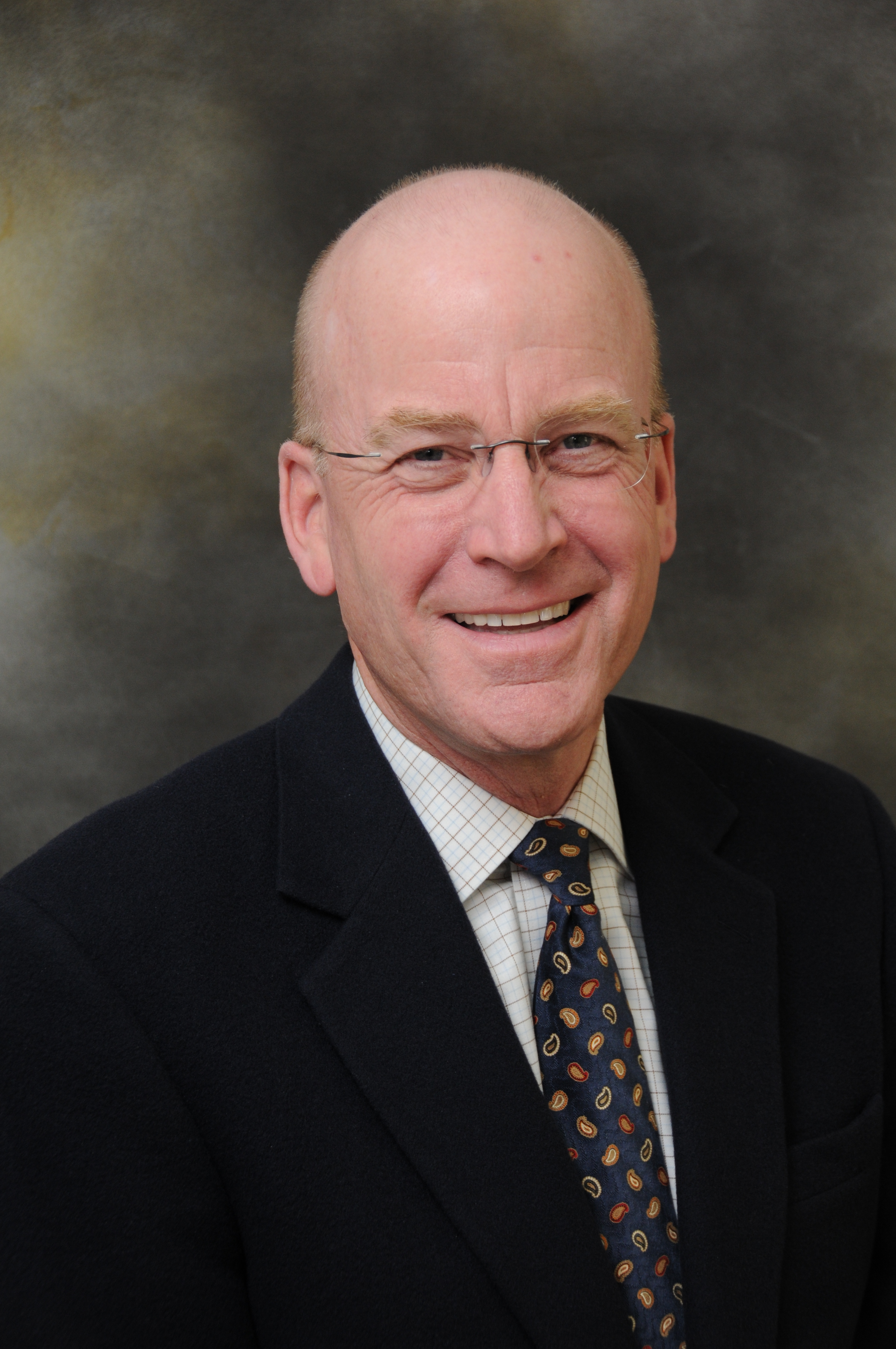

Member of the Montgomery County Board of Commissioners
- In office January 7, 2008 – January 3, 2012
- Preceded by: Ruth Damsker
- Succeeded by: Josh Shapiro
- In office January 6, 1992 – January 3, 1999
- Preceded by: Rita Banning
- Succeeded by: James Maza

Member of the U.S. House of Representatives from Pennsylvania's 13th district
- In office January 3, 1999 – January 3, 2005
- Preceded by: Jon Fox
- Succeeded by: Allyson Schwartz

Member of the Pennsylvania House of Representatives from the 153rd district
- In office January 4, 1977 – November 30, 1984
- Preceded by: Daniel Beren
- Succeeded by: Jon Fox

Personal details
- Born: Joseph Merrill Hoeffel III; September 3, 1950 (age 75) Philadelphia, Pennsylvania, U.S.
- Party: Democratic
- Spouse: Francesca Hoeffel
- Children: 2
- Relatives: Joseph Hoeffel (grandfather)
- Education: Boston University (BA); Temple University (JD)

Military service
- Branch/service: United States Army
- Years of service: 1970–1976
- Unit: United States Army Reserve

Joseph Merrill Hoeffel III (/ˈhʌfəl/ HUF-əl; born September 3, 1950) is an American author and politician. A Democrat, Hoeffel was a member of the United States House of Representatives from 1999 to 2005, representing Pennsylvania's 13th congressional district. He also served multiple terms on the Montgomery County Board of Commissioners, and from 1977 to 1984, was a member of the Pennsylvania House of Representatives. A native of Philadelphia, he is a graduate of Boston University and Temple University School of Law.

Hoeffel was an unsuccessful candidate for the United States Senate in 2004, and for Governor of Pennsylvania in 2010.

== Background ==
Hoeffel was born in Philadelphia, Pennsylvania, to Joseph and Eleanore Hoeffel. After graduating from William Penn Charter School in 1968, he attended Boston University and earned a Bachelor of Arts degree in English in 1972. He served in the Army Reserves from 1970 to 1976.

He first became involved in politics during the 1972 presidential election, when his opposition to the Vietnam War led him to support Senator George McGovern. In 1973, he became a legislative aide to Representative Gerry Studds of Massachusetts, for whom Hoeffel did research on foreign overfishing.

== Political career ==
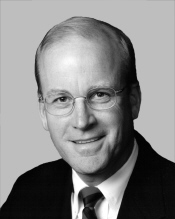
Hoeffel's official congressional photo

After working for Studds for a year, Hoeffel challenged four-term Republican incumbent Daniel Beren for a seat in the Pennsylvania House of Representatives, representing the Abington-based 153rd district, in 1974. He was defeated by 1,505 votes. From 1975 to 1976, he was the Central Montgomery County administrator for the American Red Cross.

Hoeffel successfully ran again for state House in 1976, after Beren decided to not seek re-election. He was the first Democrat to represent the Abington area since World War I. He served from 1977 to 1985. The first bill he passed as a state legislator was a campaign reform proposal in 1978 improving financial disclosure.

In 1984, he gave up his seat to run for the United States House of Representatives in the 13th congressional district, but was defeated by longtime Republican incumbent Lawrence Coughlin. Hoeffel sought a rematch in 1986, and was defeated again. He received his Juris Doctor degree from Temple University School of Law in 1986, and then worked at the Norristown law firms of Wright, Manning, Kinkaid & Oliver (1987–90) and Kane, Pugh & Driscoll (1990–91).

After several years out of politics, Hoeffel won a seat on the Montgomery County Commission in 1991. In a surprise to the political establishment, Hoeffel supported Republican Mario Mele for Commission chairman over Jon Fox.

=== Career in Congress ===
In 1996, Hoeffel made a third run at Congress, taking on his former colleague on the Montgomery County Commission, Jon Fox, now a first-term Congressman. That year, Fox hung onto his seat by an 84-vote margin. However, in 1998, in his fourth attempt, Hoeffel broke through. Hobbled by a tough Republican primary and the fallout from the impeachment process against President Bill Clinton, Fox could not hang on a second time. Hoeffel won by more than 5,000 votes. Hoeffel became only the second Democrat to represent the Montgomery County-based district in 86 years.

He won re-election twice, though not without difficulty. In 2000 he won an expensive race against Republican State Senator Stewart Greenleaf, who represented most of the eastern portion of the congressional district. He thus became the first Democrat to serve more than one term in the district in decades. In 2002, he defeated wealthy ophthalmologist Melissa Brown by less than expected; the 13th had been made somewhat more Democratic with the addition of part of Philadelphia. During the 2002 election, Hoeffel's website was praised as among the best of the 2002 election cycle.

In Congress, Hoeffel was a member of two House committees: International Relations and Transportation and Infrastructure.

On July 20, 2004, Hoeffel became the third sitting U.S. Congressman in one week, following Charles Rangel and Bobby Rush, to be arrested for trespassing while protesting alleged human rights violations in front of the Sudanese Embassy. U.S. Senator Arlen Specter, Hoeffel's Republican opponent in the 2004 U.S. Senate race, criticized the arrest as a publicity stunt.

Rather than holding onto his seat, Hoeffel decided in 2004 to run for the U.S. Senate against incumbent Republican Arlen Specter. In the election held on November 2, 2004, Hoeffel was defeated by more than ten points to Specter, 53%-42%, and only carried four counties. Hoeffel was at a considerable disadvantage because of Specter's popularity in the Philadelphia suburbs.

=== After Congress ===
Hoeffel endorsed Bob Casey, Jr. for the United States Senate in 2006; Casey defeated incumbent Republican Rick Santorum by a wide margin.

Hoeffel announced that he would run for lieutenant governor in March 2006 against incumbent Catherine Baker Knoll, but dropped out of the race a day later. Governor Ed Rendell convinced Hoeffel that the Democratic ticket needed geographic balance; Knoll is from Allegheny County; Rendell is from Philadelphia. The Democratic Committees of Bucks and Chester Counties had overwhelmingly voted to endorse him over Knoll.

In February 2007, Hoeffel announced that he would resign his post in order to run for the Montgomery County Commission with incumbent Ruth Damsker. Hoeffel's and Damsker's opponents were incumbent Jim Matthews and district attorney Bruce Castor.

Hopes were high that the Democrats could win majority control on the commission due to party gains in the county and a fractured county Republican party. Hoeffel finished second, behind Castor, winning a seat on the commission, but his running mate fell short, keeping control in Republican hands. However, thanks to a deal with Matthews, Hoeffel became Vice Chairman of the commission, in exchange for supporting Matthews' bid to become Chairman over Castor.

==== 2010 gubernatorial campaign ====
On September 20, 2009, Hoeffel announced that he would seek the Democratic nomination for Governor of Pennsylvania. During the campaign, he called for the introduction of a graduated income tax for the state, supported the implementation of a statewide single-payer health care program, stressed his pro-choice position on abortion and opposition to school vouchers, and distinguished himself as the only candidate supporting the legalization of same-sex marriage.

He received endorsements from NOW, the Stonewall Democrats, the United Auto Workers, and various local affiliates of Democracy for America.

In the May 18, 2010 primary, he placed fourth out of four candidates, receiving 130,799 votes, or 12.7% of the total votes cast, and winning Montgomery County, though without a majority.

2010 Democratic Gubernatorial Primary results
Party	Candidate	Votes	%
Democratic	Dan Onorato	452,611	45.1
Democratic	Jack Wagner	244,234	24.3
Democratic	Anthony Williams	180,932	18.0
Democratic	Joe Hoeffel	125,989	12.6
Total votes		1,003,766	97.7

==== Subsequent political career ====
Within days of losing the 2010 primary for governor, Hoeffel announced he would seek another term as county commissioner in 2011. He followed Matthews, who also initially announced his intention to seek re-election.

A subsequent grand jury report found questionable behavior on Hoeffel's part for his participation in discussing county business at private breakfast meetings held with Matthews and senior aides–an alleged violation of state Sunshine laws. However, unlike Matthews, who was later alleged to have perjured himself while testifying to the grand jury, Hoeffel was never charged with criminal wrongdoing.

On March 10, 2018, Hoeffel announced that he would seek to retake his old congressional seat, now renumbered as the 4th District. A court-ordered remap had cut out the district's share of Philadelphia. Although the new 4th was geographically similar to the area he had represented for his first two terms, he finished a distant third, with only 11 percent of the vote, well behind State Representative and fellow Abington resident Madeleine Dean.

== Political positions ==
=== Education ===
According to his campaign website, Hoeffel favors expanded funding for early childhood education programs, drop-out prevention and drop-out reengagement programs and centers, and basic education for school board members. He favors keeping the current defined benefit pension plan for all teachers over a change to a defined contribution plan for new hires. Hoeffel would continue the school funding formula implemented by Governor Ed Rendell to reduce dependence on local property taxes to fund schools.

=== Labor ===
Hoeffel has a lifetime 97% rating from the AFL-CIO and is endorsed by several labor unions in the Philadelphia area.

=== Abortion ===
Hoeffel has a 100% rating from NARAL Pro-Choice America. He is endorsed by former NARAL Pro-Choice America President Kate Michelman, and by the Pennsylvania chapter of the National Organization for Women

=== LGBT rights ===
He favors amending Pennsylvania's Hate Crimes Law to include crimes targeting LGBT people and supports full marriage rights.

== Writing ==
Hoeffel's book about his vote for the Iraq War, The Iraq Lie: How the White House Sold the War, was published in 2014 by Progressive Press. Hoeffel provides a first-person account of the Congressional debate on the Iraq War Resolution, and argues that the Bush White House misled Congress and the country and took the United States to war in Iraq under false pretenses. Hoeffel suggests intelligence reforms to prevent such deceptions from happening again.

Hoeffel's second book, Fighting for the Progressive Center in the Age of Trump, was published in August 2017 by Praeger. In this book, Hoeffel argues that "progressives must fight for the political center of our civic arena with policies that are both socially liberal and fiscally responsible if we want to win the battle for public support against Donald Trump." The book is a mix of policy prescriptions which reject partisan extremes and rigid ideologies, with numerous anecdotes from 25 years serving in elected office at the county, state and federal levels.

== Personal life ==
He is married to Francesca Hoeffel. They live in Abington Township, a suburb of Philadelphia, and have two children. His grandfather, also named Joseph M. "Joe" Hoeffel, served as coach of the Green Bay Packers in 1921.

== Congressional electoral history ==
Pennsylvania's 13th congressional district: Results 1996–2002
Year	Democrat	Votes	Pct	Republican	Votes	Pct	3rd Party	Party	Votes	Pct	3rd Party	Party	Votes	Pct
1996	Joseph M. Hoeffel	120,220	49%	Jon D. Fox	120,304	49%	Thomas Patrick Burke	Libertarian	4,930	2%	Bill Ryan	Natural Law	525	<1%
1998	Joseph M. Hoeffel	95,105	52%	Jon D. Fox	85,915	47%	Thomas Patrick Burke	Libertarian	3,470	2%				
2000	Joseph M. Hoeffel	146,026	53%	Stewart J. Greenleaf	126,501	46%	Ken Cavanaugh	Libertarian	4,224	2%				
2002	Joseph M. Hoeffel	107,945	51%	Melissa Brown	100,295	47%	John P. McDermott	Constitution	3,627	2%				

Pennsylvania Senator (Class III): 2004 Results
Year	Democrat	Votes	Pct	Republican	Votes	Pct	3rd Party	Party	Votes	Pct	3rd Party	Party	Votes	Pct	
2004	Joseph M. Hoeffel	2,334,126	42%	Arlen Specter	2,925,080	53%	James Clymer	Constitution	220,056	4%	Betsy Summers	Libertarian	79,263	1%	*

*Write-in and minor candidate notes: In 2004, write-ins received 580 votes.

U.S. House of Representatives
Preceded by Jon Fox	Member of the U.S. House of Representatives from Pennsylvania's 13th congressional district 1999–2005	Succeeded by Allyson Schwartz
Party political offices
Preceded by Bill Lloyd	Democratic nominee for U.S. Senator from Pennsylvania (Class 3); 2004	Succeeded by Joe Sestak
U.S. order of precedence (ceremonial)
Preceded by Paul McHale as Former U.S. Representative	Order of precedence of the United States as Former U.S. Representative	Succeeded by Melissa Hart as Former U.S. Representative
