= Pennsylvania House of Representatives, District 153 =

American legislative district

Pennsylvania's 153rd State House of Representatives district
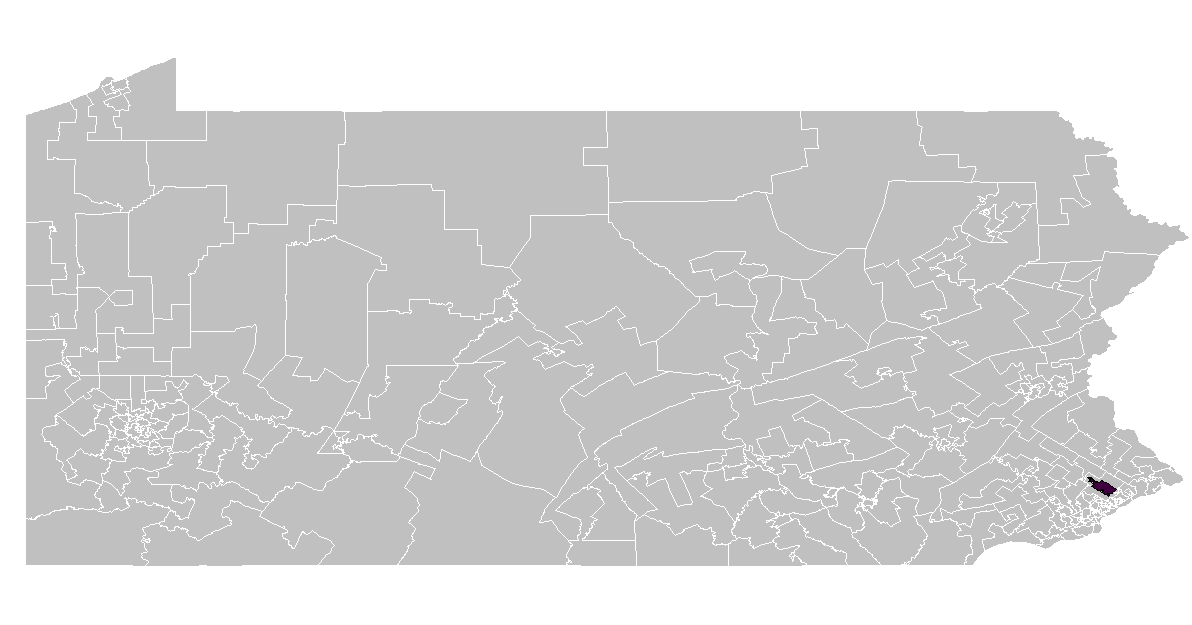
Representative
Ben Sanchez; D–Abington Township

The 153rd Pennsylvania House of Representatives District is located in Montgomery County and includes the following areas:

- Abington Township
- Upper Dublin Township (PART)
  - District 02 [PART, Division 03]
  - District 04 [PART, Divisions 02 and 03]
  - District 05

== Representatives ==
Representative	Party	Years	District home	Note
Prior to 1969, seats were apportioned by county.
Daniel E. Beren	Republican	1969 – 1976		
Joe Hoeffel	Democrat	1977 – 1984	Abington Township	
Jon D. Fox	Republican	1985 – 1992	Abington Township	Resigned January 16, 1992 to become County Commissioner
Martin L. Laub	Republican	1993 – 1994		
Ellen M. Bard	Republican	1995 – 2004	Jenkintown	Retired to run for Congress
Josh Shapiro	Democrat	2005 – 2012	Abington Township	Resigned to take office as Montgomery County Commissioner
Madeleine Dean	Democrat	2012 – 2018	Abington Township	Elected in special election on April 24, 2012. Retired after election to Congress.
Ben Sanchez	Democrat	2019 – present		Incumbent
