= Martin Laub =

American politician

Martin L. Laub

Member of the Pennsylvania House of Representatives from the 153rd district
- In office January 5, 1993 – November 30, 1994
- Preceded by: Jon Fox
- Succeeded by: Ellen Bard

Personal details
- Born: February 26, 1944 (age 82) Philadelphia, Pennsylvania
- Party: Republican

Martin L. Laub (born February 26, 1944) is a former Republican member of the Pennsylvania House of Representatives. He is a native of Philadelphia.

== Pennsylvania House of Representatives ==
Laub served in the Pennsylvania House of Representatives from January 5, 1993 until he was released from duty in November 30, 1994.
