= Ellen Bard =

American politician

Ellen M. Bard

Member of the Pennsylvania House of Representatives from the 153rd district
- In office January 3, 1995 – November 30, 2004
- Preceded by: Martin Laub
- Succeeded by: Josh Shapiro

Personal details
- Born: January 11, 1949 Minneapolis, Minnesota, U.S.
- Died: October 28, 2009 (aged 60) San Francisco, California, U.S.
- Party: Republican
- Spouse: Robert G. Stiratelli
- Children: 1
- Education: Pomona College
- Occupation: legislator

Ellen M. Bard (January 11, 1949 – October 28, 2009) was an American politician serving as a Republican member of the Pennsylvania House of Representatives.

== Early life and education ==
Bard was born in Minneapolis, Minnesota. She graduated from Pomona College in 1971. She also earned a M.S. degree from the Boston University School of Public Communication in 1972 and another M.S. from the MIT Sloan School of Management in 1980. Bard was also a Marshall Scholar.

== Legislative career ==
She was elected to represent Ward 7 on the Abington Township Board of Commissioners in 1990. In 1994, after one term as a Township Commissioner, she was elected to represent the 153rd legislative district in the Pennsylvania House of Representatives. During her tenure there, she has had 17 bills signed into law. During her legislative career, she was known for advocating on behalf of the Abington School District and for her work on energy and environmental issues, including her service as Chair of the Task Force on a 21st Century Energy Policy for Pennsylvania.

She left her PA House seat to run for Pennsylvania's 13th congressional district, losing the Republican primary to Melissa Brown, who went on to lose to Allyson Schwartz.

== Death ==
In May 2009, after her diagnosis with pancreatic cancer, she and her husband moved from Jenkintown to San Francisco to be near their daughter. She died in October 2009.
