= Daniel Beren =

American politician

Member of the Pennsylvania House of Representatives from the 153rd district
- In office January 7, 1969 – November 30, 1976
- Preceded by: District Created
- Succeeded by: Joe Hoeffel

Member of the Pennsylvania House of Representatives from the Montgomery County district
- In office January 2, 1967 – November 30, 1968

Personal details
- Born: November 3, 1929 Philadelphia, Pennsylvania
- Died: December 14, 2014 (aged 85) Wormleysburg, Pennsylvania
- Party: Republican

Daniel E. Beren (November 3, 1929 – December 14, 2014) was a Republican member of the Pennsylvania House of Representatives.
