= 2004 United States House of Representatives elections in Pennsylvania =

- November 2, 2004

All 19 Pennsylvania seats to the United States House of Representatives
	Majority party	Minority party
Party	Republican	Democratic
Last election	12	7
Seats won	12	7
Seat change	Steady	Steady
Popular vote	2,565,077	2,478,239
Percentage	49.80%	48.11%
Swing	▼6.39%	▲7.35%

Republican hold Democratic hold
Republican
40–50%
50–60%
60–70%
70–80%
80–90%
>90%
Democratic
50–60%
60–70%
70–80%
80–90%
>90%

The 2004 United States House elections in Pennsylvania was an election for Pennsylvania's delegation to the United States House of Representatives, which occurred as part of the general election of the House of Representatives on November 2, 2004.

== Overview ==
United States House of Representatives elections in Pennsylvania, 2004
Party	Votes	Percentage	Seats Before	Seats After	+/–
Republican	2,565,077	49.80%	12	12	0
Democratic	2,478,239	48.11%	7	7	0
Libertarian	54,751	1.06%	0	0	0
Constitution	34,573	0.67%	0	0	0
Green	14,353	0.28%	0	0	0
Independent	4,142	0.08%	0	0	0
Totals	5,151,135	100.00%	19	19	—

=== Match-up summary ===
District	Democratic		Republican		Others		Total		Result
District	Votes	%	Votes	%	Votes	%	Votes	%	Result
District 1	214,462	86.27%	33,266	13.38%	857	0.35%	248,585	100.00%	Democratic hold
District 2	253,226	88.04%	34,411	11.96%	0	0.00%	287,637	100.00%	Democratic hold
District 3	110,684	39.92%	166,580	60.08%	0	0.00%	277,264	100.00%	Republican hold
District 4	116,303	35.91%	204,329	63.08%	3,285	1.01%	323,917	100.00%	Republican hold
District 5	0	0.00%	192,852	88.02%	26,239	11.98%	219,091	100.00%	Republican hold
District 6	153,977	48.99%	160,348	51.01%	0	0.00%	314,325	100.00%	Republican hold
District 7	134,932	40.33%	196,556	58.76%	3,039	0.91%	334,527	100.00%	Republican hold
District 8	143,427	43.30%	183,229	55.31%	4,608	1.39%	331,264	100.00%	Republican hold
District 9	80,787	30.47%	184,320	69.53%	0	0.00%	265,107	100.00%	Republican hold
District 10	0	0.00%	191,967	92.84%	14,805	7.16%	206,772	100.00%	Republican hold
District 11	171,147	94.42%	0	0.00%	10,105	5.58%	181,252	100.00%	Democratic hold
District 12	204,504	100.00%	0	0.00%	0	0.00%	204,504	100.00%	Democratic hold
District 13	171,763	55.75%	127,205	41.28%	9,156	2.97%	308,124	100.00%	Democratic hold
District 14	220,139	100.00%	0	0.00%	0	0.00%	220,139	100.00%	Democratic hold
District 15	114,646	39.38%	170,634	58.61%	5,854	2.01%	291,134	100.00%	Republican hold
District 16	98,410	34.49%	183,620	64.36%	3,269	1.15%	285,299	100.00%	Republican hold
District 17	172,412	59.09%	113,592	38.93%	5,782	1.98%	291,786	100.00%	Democratic hold
District 18	117,420	37.24%	197,894	62.76%	0	0.00%	315,314	100.00%	Republican hold
District 19	0	0.00%	224,274	91.51%	20,820	8.49%	245,094	100.00%	Republican hold
Total	2,478,239	48.11%	2,565,077	49.80%	107,819	2.09%	5,151,135	100.00%	

Popular vote
Republican	49.80%
Democratic	48.11%
Other	2.09%

House seats
Republican	63.16%
Democratic	36.84%

== District 1 ==
2004 Pennsylvania's 1st congressional district election
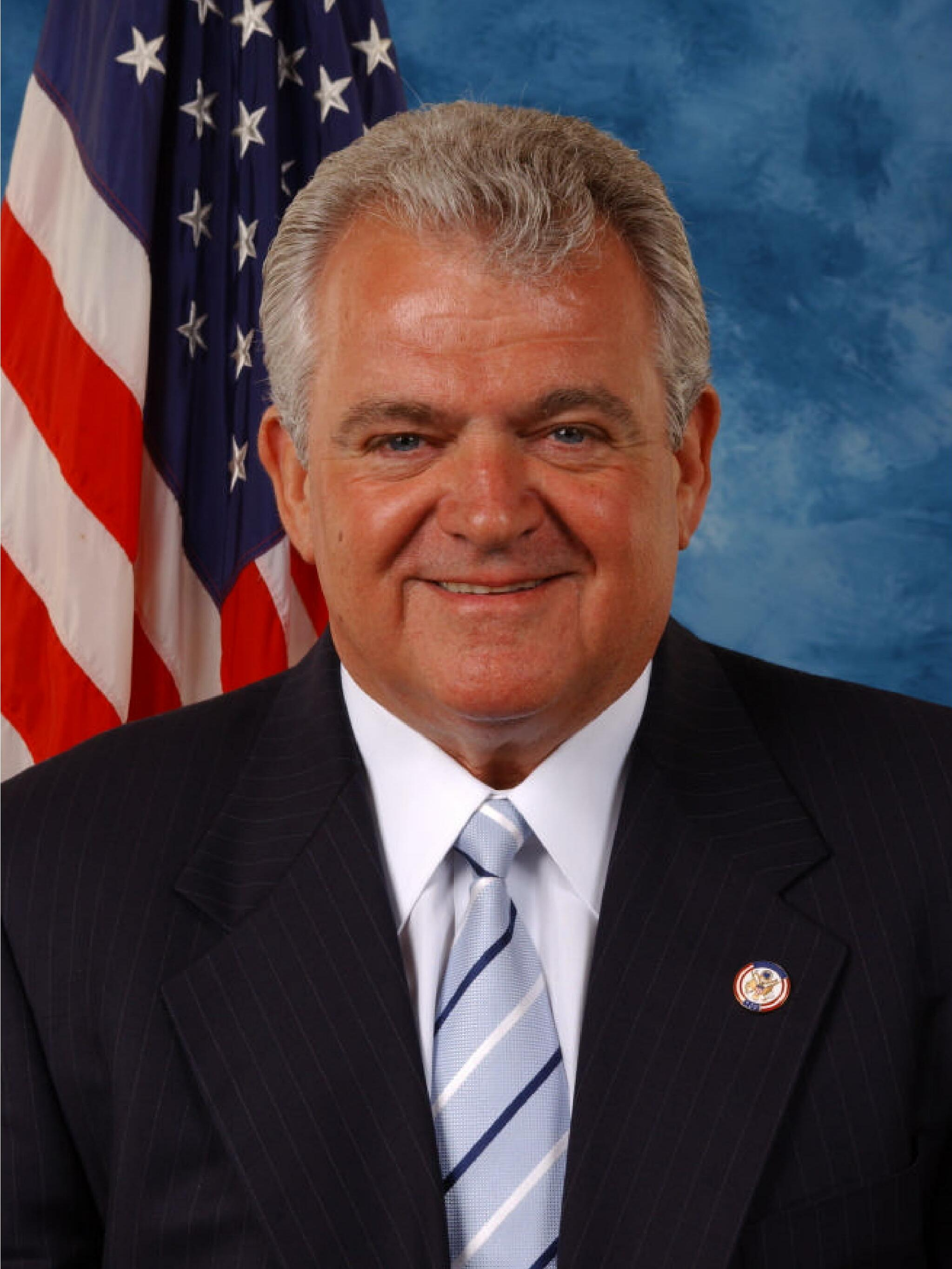

Nominee	Bob Brady	Deborah Williams
Party	Democratic	Republican
Popular vote	214,462	33,266
Percentage	86.27%	13.38%
- County results Brady: 80–90%
U.S. representative before election
Bob Brady
Democratic
Elected U.S. representative
Bob Brady
Democratic

=== Democratic primary ===
==== Candidates ====
===== Nominee =====
- Bob Brady, incumbent U.S. Representative

==== Primary results ====
Democratic primary results
Party	Candidate	Votes	%
Democratic	Bob Brady (incumbent)	45,426	100.00
Total votes		45,426	100.00

=== Republican primary ===
==== Candidates ====
===== Nominee =====
- Deborah L. Williams

==== Primary results ====
Republican primary results
Party	Candidate	Votes	%
Republican	Deborah L. Williams	6,486	100.00
Total votes		6,486	100.00

=== General election ===
==== Predictions ====
Source	Ranking	As of
The Cook Political Report	Safe D	October 29, 2004
Sabato's Crystal Ball	Safe D	November 1, 2004

==== Results ====
General Election 2004: Pennsylvania's 1st congressional district
Party	Candidate	Votes	%
Democratic	Bob Brady (incumbent)	214,462	86.27
Republican	Deborah L. Williams	33,266	13.38
Independent	Christopher Randolph	857	0.35
Total votes		248,585	100.00

== District 2 ==
2004 Pennsylvania's 2nd congressional district election
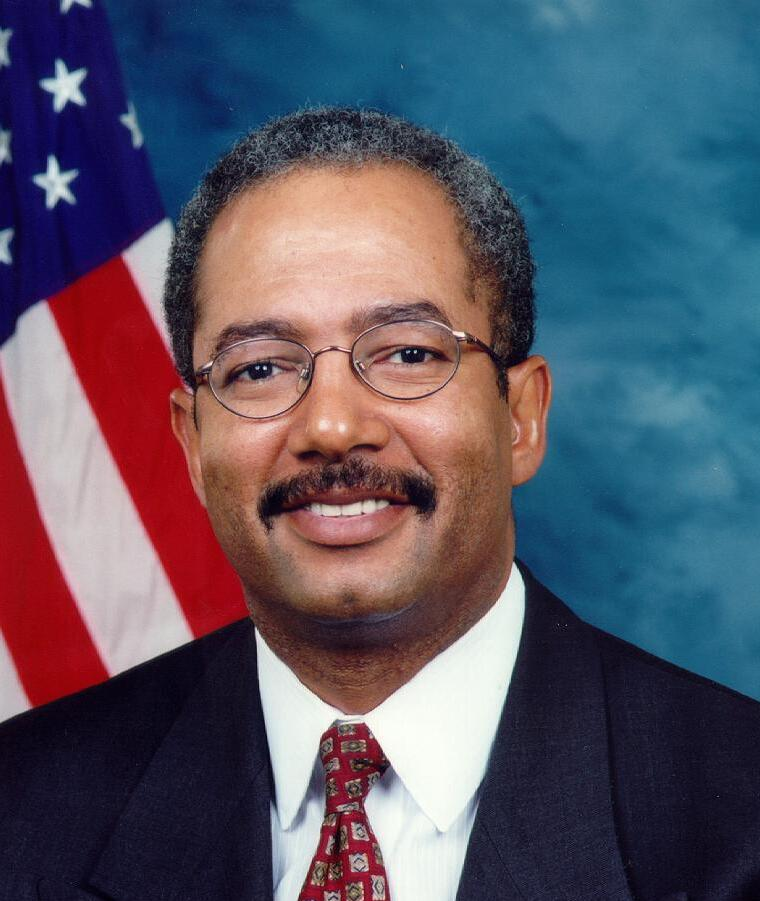

Nominee	Chaka Fattah	Stewart Bolno
Party	Democratic	Republican
Popular vote	253,226	34,411
Percentage	88.04%	11.96%
- County results Fattah: 70–80% 80–90%
U.S. representative before election
Chaka Fattah
Democratic
Elected U.S. representative
Chaka Fattah
Democratic

=== Democratic primary ===
==== Candidates ====
===== Nominee =====
- Chaka Fattah, incumbent U.S. Representative

==== Primary results ====
Democratic primary results
Party	Candidate	Votes	%
Democratic	Chaka Fattah (incumbent)	61,456	100.00
Total votes		61,456	100.00

=== Republican primary ===
==== Candidates ====
===== Nominee =====
- Stewart Bolno

==== Primary results ====
Republican primary results
Party	Candidate	Votes	%
Republican	Stewart Bolno	7,058	100.00
Total votes		7,058	100.00

=== General election ===
==== Predictions ====
Source	Ranking	As of
The Cook Political Report	Safe D	October 29, 2004
Sabato's Crystal Ball	Safe D	November 1, 2004

==== Results ====
General Election 2004: Pennsylvania's 2nd congressional district
Party	Candidate	Votes	%
Democratic	Chaka Fattah (incumbent)	253,226	88.04
Republican	Stewart Bolno	34,411	11.96
Total votes		287,637	100.00

== District 3 ==
2004 Pennsylvania's 3rd congressional district election
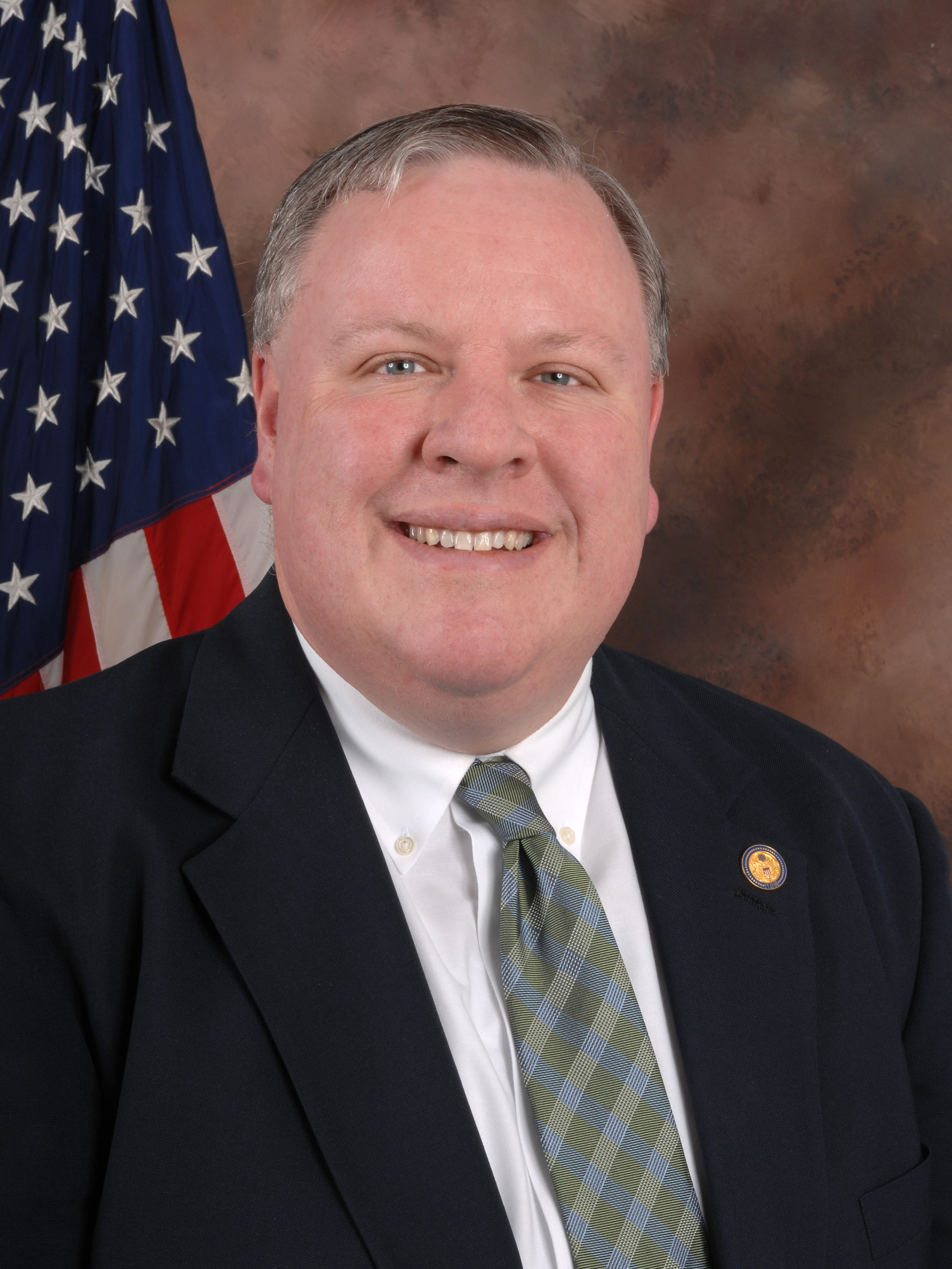

Nominee	Phil English	Steven Porter
Party	Republican	Democratic
Popular vote	166,580	110,684
Percentage	60.08%	39.92%
- County results English: 50–60% 60–70% 70–80%
U.S. representative before election
Phil English
Republican
Elected U.S. representative
Phil English
Republican

=== Democratic primary ===
==== Candidates ====
===== Nominee =====
- Steven Porter

==== Primary results ====
Democratic primary results
Party	Candidate	Votes	%
Democratic	Steven Porter	32,544	100.00
Total votes		32,544	100.00

=== Republican primary ===
==== Candidates ====
===== Nominee =====
- Phil English, incumbent U.S. Representative

==== Primary results ====
Republican primary results
Party	Candidate	Votes	%
Republican	Phil English (incumbent)	50,634	100.00
Total votes		50,634	100.00

=== General election ===
==== Predictions ====
Source	Ranking	As of
The Cook Political Report	Safe R	October 29, 2004
Sabato's Crystal Ball	Safe R	November 1, 2004

==== Results ====
General Election 2004: Pennsylvania's 3rd congressional district
Party	Candidate	Votes	%
Republican	Phil English (incumbent)	166,580	60.08
Democratic	Steven Porter	110,684	39.92
Total votes		277,264	100.00

== District 4 ==
2004 Pennsylvania's 4th congressional district election
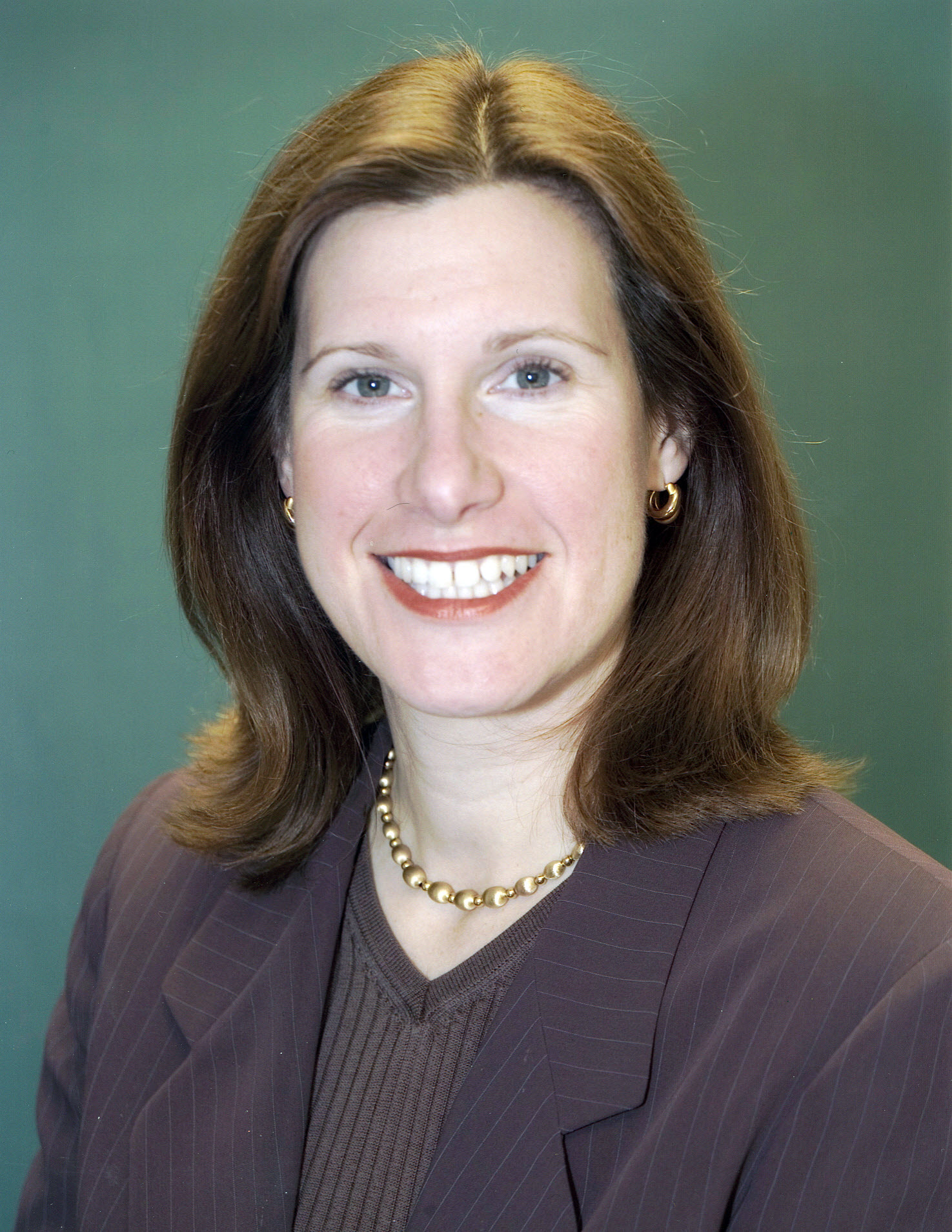

Nominee	Melissa Hart	Stevan Drobac
Party	Republican	Democratic
Popular vote	204,329	116,303
Percentage	63.08%	35.91%
- County results Hart: 50–60% 60–70% 70–80% Drobac: 60–70%
U.S. representative before election
Melissa Hart
Republican
Elected U.S. representative
Melissa Hart
Republican

=== Democratic primary ===
==== Candidates ====
===== Nominee =====
- Stevan Drobac

==== Eliminated in primary ====
- Eric A. Wafer

==== Primary results ====
Democratic primary results
Party	Candidate	Votes	%
Democratic	Stevan Drobac	29,024	61.04
Democratic	Eric A. Wafer	18,529	38.96
Total votes		47,553	100.00

=== Republican primary ===
==== Candidates ====
===== Nominee =====
- Melissa Hart, incumbent U.S. Representative

==== Primary results ====
Republican primary results
Party	Candidate	Votes	%
Republican	Melissa Hart (incumbent)	53,721	100.00
Total votes		53,721	100.00

=== General election ===
==== Predictions ====
Source	Ranking	As of
The Cook Political Report	Safe R	October 29, 2004
Sabato's Crystal Ball	Safe R	November 1, 2004

==== Results ====
General Election 2004: Pennsylvania's 4th congressional district
Party	Candidate	Votes	%
Republican	Melissa Hart (incumbent)	204,329	63.08
Democratic	Stevan Drobac	116,303	35.91
Independent	Steven B. Larchuk	3,285	1.01
Total votes		323,917	100.00

== District 5 ==
2004 Pennsylvania's 5th congressional district election
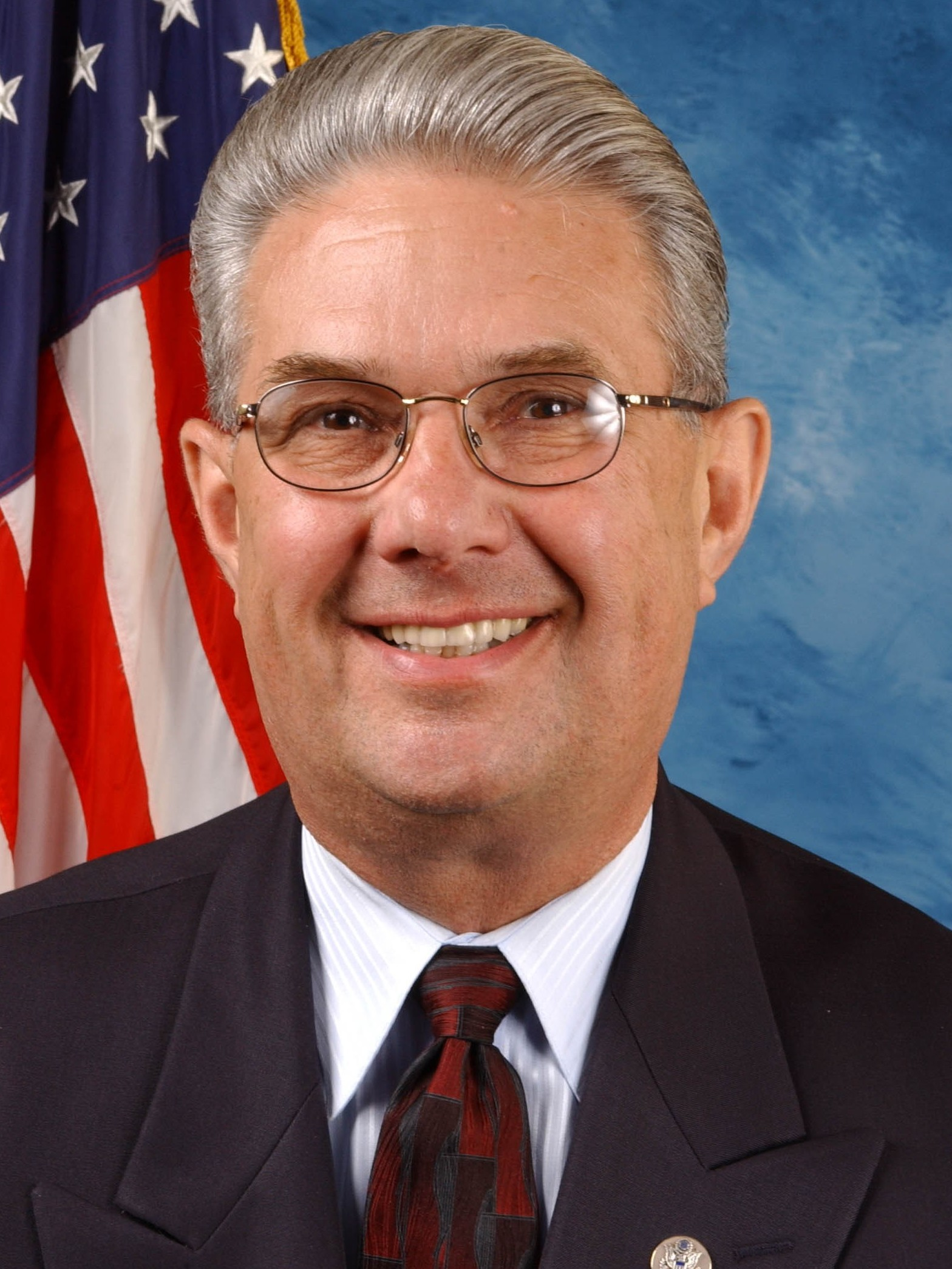

Nominee	John E. Peterson	Thomas Martin
Party	Republican	Libertarian
Popular vote	192,852	26,239
Percentage	88.02%	11.98%
- County results Peterson: 80–90% 90–100%
U.S. representative before election
John E. Peterson
Republican
Elected U.S. representative
John E. Peterson
Republican

=== Republican primary ===
==== Candidates ====
===== Nominee =====
- John E. Peterson, incumbent U.S. Representative

==== Eliminated in primary ====
- Bob Perry

==== Primary results ====
Republican primary results
Party	Candidate	Votes	%
Republican	John E. Peterson (incumbent)	47,216	77.76
Republican	Bob Perry	13,501	22.24
Total votes		60,717	100.00

=== General election ===
==== Predictions ====
Source	Ranking	As of
The Cook Political Report	Safe R	October 29, 2004
Sabato's Crystal Ball	Safe R	November 1, 2004

==== Results ====
General Election 2004: Pennsylvania's 5th congressional district
Party	Candidate	Votes	%
Republican	John E. Peterson (incumbent)	192,852	88.02
Libertarian	Thomas A. Martin	26,239	11.98
Total votes		219,091	100.00

== District 6 ==
2004 Pennsylvania's 6th congressional district election
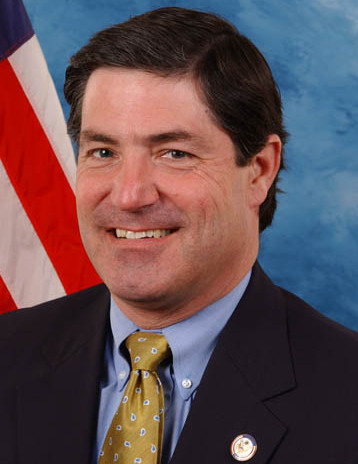

Nominee	Jim Gerlach	Lois Murphy
Party	Republican	Democratic
Popular vote	160,348	153,977
Percentage	51.01%	48.99%
- County results Gerlach: 50–60% 60–70% Murphy: 50–60%
U.S. representative before election
Jim Gerlach
Republican
Elected U.S. representative
Jim Gerlach
Republican

=== Democratic primary ===
==== Nominee ====
- Lois Murphy

==== Primary results ====
Democratic primary results
Party	Candidate	Votes	%
Democratic	Lois Murphy	23,310	100.00
Total votes		23,310	100.00

=== Republican primary ===
==== Nominee ====
- Jim Gerlach, incumbent U.S. Representative

==== Primary results ====
Republican primary results
Party	Candidate	Votes	%
Republican	Jim Gerlach (incumbent)	50,809	100.00
Total votes		50,809	100.00

=== General election ===
==== Predictions ====
Source	Ranking	As of
The Cook Political Report	Lean R	October 29, 2004
Sabato's Crystal Ball	Lean R	November 1, 2004

==== Results ====
General Election 2004: Pennsylvania's 6th congressional district
Party	Candidate	Votes	%
Republican	Jim Gerlach (incumbent)	160,348	51.01
Democratic	Lois Murphy	153,977	48.99
Total votes		314,325	100.00

== District 7 ==
2004 Pennsylvania's 7th congressional district election
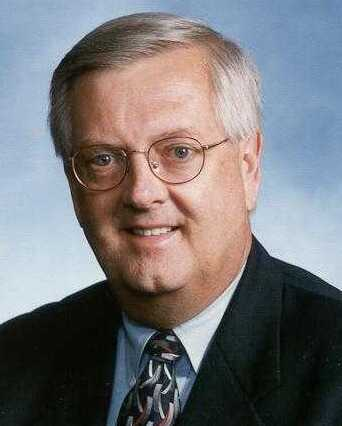

Nominee	Curt Weldon	Paul Scoles
Party	Republican	Democratic
Popular vote	196,556	134,932
Percentage	58.76%	40.33%
- County results Weldon: 50–60% 60–70%
U.S. representative before election
Curt Weldon
Republican
Elected U.S. representative
Curt Weldon
Republican

=== Democratic primary ===
==== Nominee ====
- Greg Philips (Note: Replaced by Paul Scoles in the general election.)

==== Primary results ====
Democratic primary results
Party	Candidate	Votes	%
Democratic	Greg Philips	15,552	100.00
Total votes		15,552	100.00

=== Republican primary ===
==== Nominee ====
- Curt Weldon, incumbent U.S. Representative

==== Primary results ====
Republican primary results
Party	Candidate	Votes	%
Republican	Curt Weldon (incumbent)	66,816	100.00
Total votes		66,816	100.00

=== General election ===
==== Predictions ====
Source	Ranking	As of
The Cook Political Report	Safe R	October 29, 2004
Sabato's Crystal Ball	Safe R	November 1, 2004

==== Results ====
General Election 2004: Pennsylvania's 7th congressional district
Party	Candidate	Votes	%
Republican	Curt Weldon (incumbent)	196,556	58.76
Democratic	Paul Scoles	134,932	40.33
Libertarian	David Jahn	3,039	0.91
Total votes		334,527	100.00

== District 8 ==
2004 Pennsylvania's 8th congressional district election
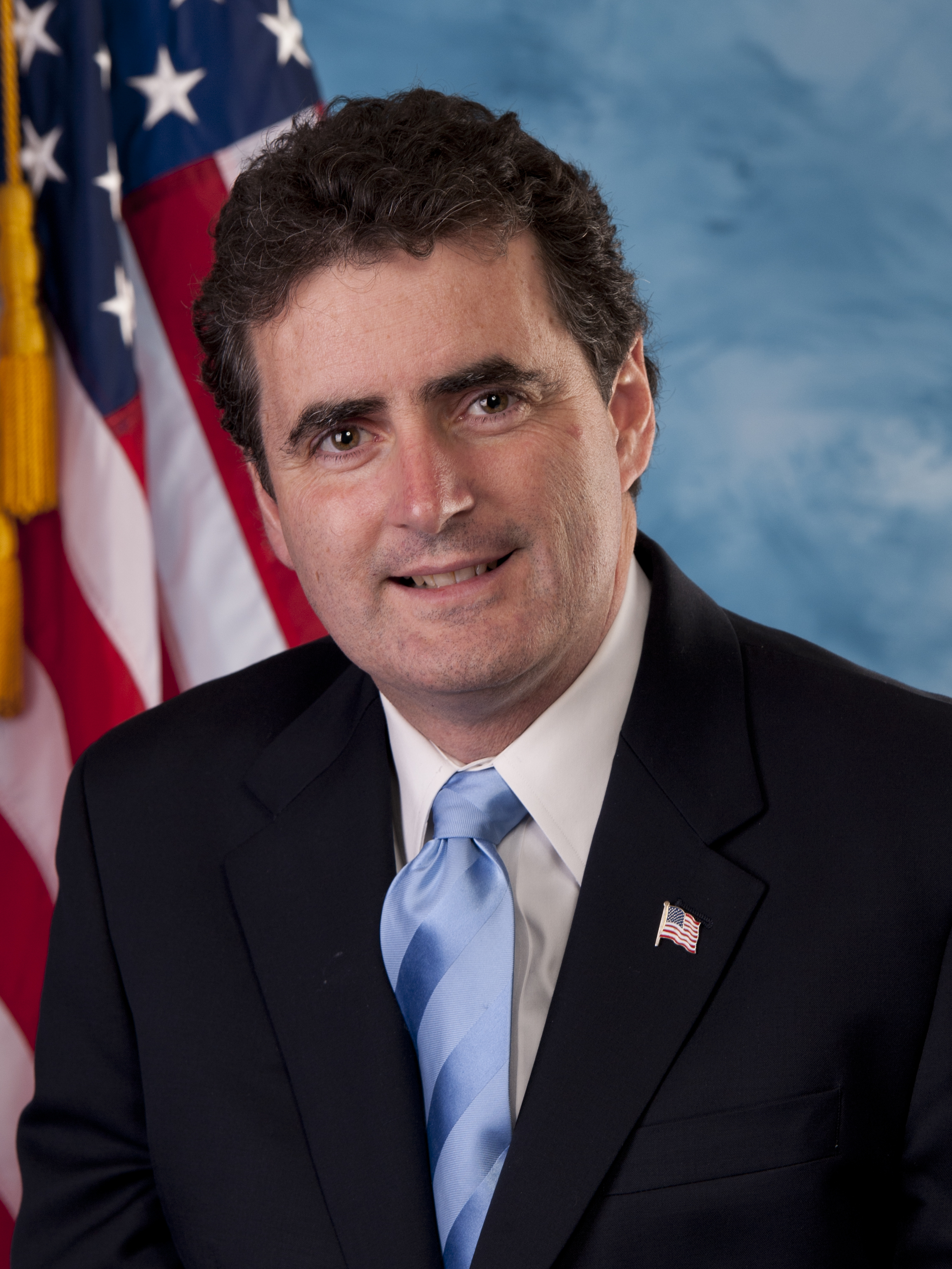

Nominee	Mike Fitzpatrick	Virginia Schrader
Party	Republican	Democratic
Popular vote	183,229	143,427
Percentage	55.31%	43.30%
- County results Fitzpatrick: 50–60% Schrader: 50–60%
U.S. representative before election
Jim Greenwood
Republican
Elected U.S. representative
Mike Fitzpatrick
Republican

Incumbent Rep. Jim Greenwood, despite winning the Republican primary, announced his retirement in July. In the party convention to replace him, Bucks County Commissioner Mike Fitzpatrick was selected over State Senator Joe Conti, Greenwood's choice.

=== Democratic primary ===
==== Nominee ====
- Virginia Waters Schrader, activist

==== Eliminated in primary ====
- Tom Lingenfelter

==== Primary results ====
Democratic primary results
Party	Candidate	Votes	%
Democratic	Virginia Waters Schrader	17,313	61.28
Democratic	Tom Lingenfelter	10,941	38.72
Total votes		28,254	100.00

=== Republican primary ===
==== Nominee ====
- Jim Greenwood, incumbent U.S. Representative

==== Eliminated in primary ====
- Joseph V. Montone

==== Primary results ====
Republican primary results
Party	Candidate	Votes	%
Republican	Jim Greenwood (incumbent)	38,279	69.12
Republican	Joseph V. Montone	17,098	30.88
Total votes		55,377	100.00

=== General election ===
==== Predictions ====
Source	Ranking	As of
The Cook Political Report	Lean R	October 29, 2004
Sabato's Crystal Ball	Safe R	November 1, 2004

==== Results ====
General Election 2004: Pennsylvania's 8th congressional district
Party	Candidate	Votes	%
Republican	Mike Fitzpatrick	183,229	55.31
Democratic	Virginia Waters Schrader	143,427	43.30
Libertarian	Arthur L. Farnsworth	3,710	1.12
Constitution	Erich G. Lukas	898	0.27
Total votes		331,264	100.00

== District 9 ==
2004 Pennsylvania's 9th congressional district election
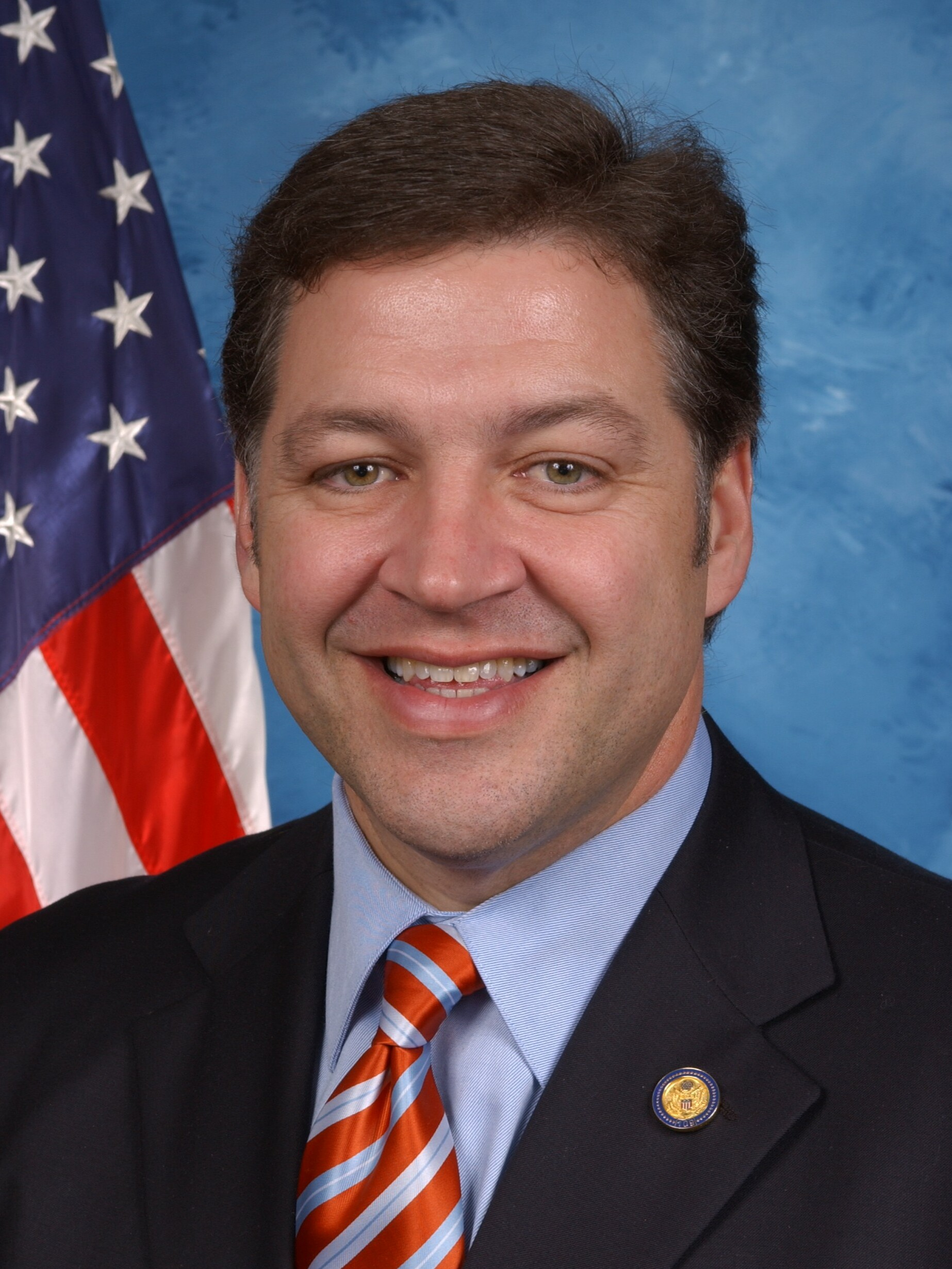

Nominee	Bill Shuster	Paul Politis
Party	Republican	Democratic
Popular vote	184,320	80,787
Percentage	69.53%	30.47%
- County results Shuster: 50–60% 60–70% 70–80%
U.S. representative before election
Bill Shuster
Republican
Elected U.S. representative
Bill Shuster
Republican

=== Democratic primary ===
==== Nominee ====
- Paul I. Politis

==== Primary results ====
Democratic primary results
Party	Candidate	Votes	%
Democratic	Paul I. Politis	28,092	100.00
Total votes		28,092	100.00

=== Republican primary ===
==== Nominee ====
- Bill Shuster, incumbent U.S. Representative

==== Eliminated in primary ====
- Michael DelGrosso

==== Primary results ====
Republican primary results
Party	Candidate	Votes	%
Republican	Bill Shuster (incumbent)	43,097	51.34
Republican	Michael DelGrosso	40,845	48.66
Total votes		83,942	100.00

=== General election ===
==== Predictions ====
Source	Ranking	As of
The Cook Political Report	Safe R	October 29, 2004
Sabato's Crystal Ball	Safe R	November 1, 2004

==== Results ====
General Election 2004: Pennsylvania's 9th congressional district
Party	Candidate	Votes	%
Republican	Bill Shuster (incumbent)	184,320	69.53
Democratic	Paul I. Politis	80,787	30.47
Total votes		265,107	100.00

== District 10 ==
2004 Pennsylvania's 10th congressional district election
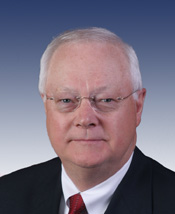

Nominee	Don Sherwood	Veronica Hannevig
Party	Republican	Constitution
Popular vote	191,967	14,805
Percentage	92.84%	7.16%
- County results Sherwood: 80–90% 90–100%
U.S. representative before election
Don Sherwood
Republican
Elected U.S. representative
Don Sherwood
Republican

=== Republican primary ===
==== Nominee ====
- Don Sherwood, incumbent U.S. Representative

==== Primary results ====
Republican primary results
Party	Candidate	Votes	%
Republican	Don Sherwood (incumbent)	54,115	100.00
Total votes		54,115	100.00

=== General election ===
==== Predictions ====
Source	Ranking	As of
The Cook Political Report	Safe R	October 29, 2004
Sabato's Crystal Ball	Safe R	November 1, 2004

==== Results ====
General Election 2004: Pennsylvania's 10th congressional district
Party	Candidate	Votes	%
Republican	Don Sherwood (incumbent)	191,967	92.84
Constitution	Veronica A. Hannevig	14,805	7.16
Total votes		206,772	100.00

== District 11 ==
2004 Pennsylvania's 11th congressional district election
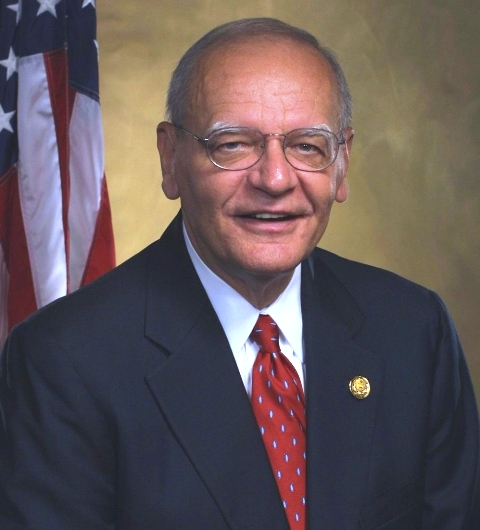

Nominee	Paul Kanjorski	Kenneth Brenneman
Party	Democratic	Constitution
Popular vote	171,147	10,105
Percentage	94.42%	5.58%
- County results Kanjorski: 80–90% 90–100%
U.S. representative before election
Paul Kanjorski
Democratic
Elected U.S. representative
Paul Kanjorski
Democratic

=== Democratic primary ===
==== Nominee ====
- Paul Kanjorski, incumbent U.S. Representative

==== Primary results ====
Democratic primary results
Party	Candidate	Votes	%
Democratic	Paul Kanjorski (incumbent)	35,055	100.00
Total votes		35,055	100.00

=== General election ===
==== Predictions ====
Source	Ranking	As of
The Cook Political Report	Safe D	October 29, 2004
Sabato's Crystal Ball	Safe D	November 1, 2004

==== Results ====
General Election 2004: Pennsylvania's 11th congressional district
Party	Candidate	Votes	%
Democratic	Paul Kanjorski (incumbent)	171,147	94.42
Constitution	Kenneth C. Brenneman	10,105	5.58
Total votes		181,252	100.00

== District 12 ==
2004 Pennsylvania's 12th congressional district election
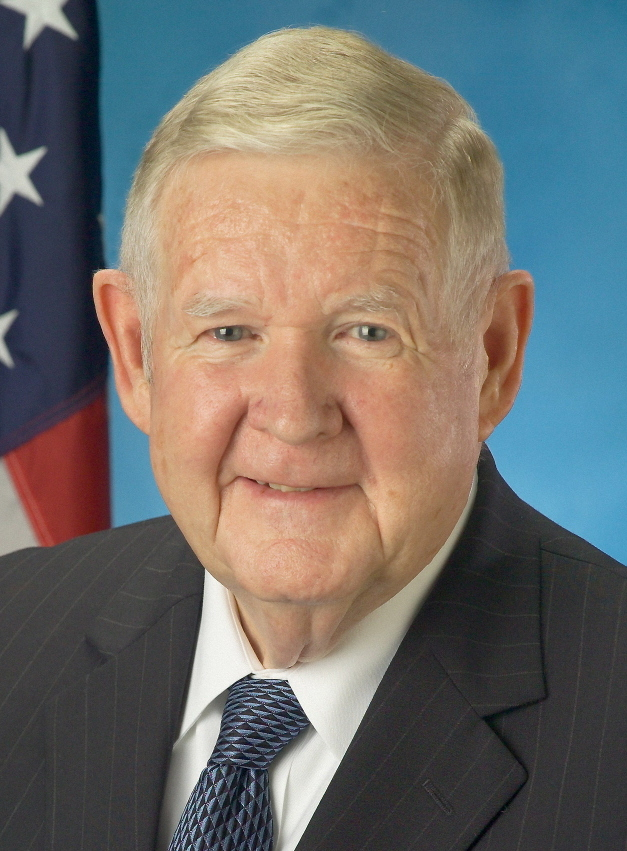
Nominee	John Murtha
Party	Democratic
Popular vote	204,504
Percentage	100.00%
U.S. representative before election
John Murtha
Democratic
Elected U.S. representative
John Murtha
Democratic

=== Democratic primary ===
==== Nominee ====
- John Murtha, incumbent U.S. Representative

==== Primary results ====
Democratic primary results
Party	Candidate	Votes	%
Democratic	John Murtha (incumbent)	61,190	100.00
Total votes		61,190	100.00

=== General election ===
==== Predictions ====
Source	Ranking	As of
The Cook Political Report	Safe D	October 29, 2004
Sabato's Crystal Ball	Safe D	November 1, 2004

==== Results ====
General Election 2004: Pennsylvania's 12th congressional district
Party	Candidate	Votes	%
Democratic	John Murtha (incumbent)	204,504	100.00
Total votes		204,504	100.00

== District 13 ==
2004 Pennsylvania's 13th congressional district election
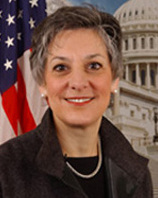

Nominee	Allyson Schwartz	Melissa Brown
Party	Democratic	Republican
Popular vote	171,763	127,205
Percentage	55.75%	41.28%
- County results Schwartz: 50–60%
U.S. representative before election
Joe Hoeffel
Democratic
Elected U.S. representative
Allyson Schwartz
Democratic

=== Democratic primary ===
==== Nominee ====
- Allyson Schwartz, member of the Pennsylvania State Senate

==== Eliminated in primary ====
- Joe Torsella, former Chair of the National Constitution Center

==== Primary results ====
Democratic primary results
Party	Candidate	Votes	%
Democratic	Allyson Schwartz	24,309	52.23
Democratic	Joe Torsella	22,232	47.77
Total votes		46,541	100.00

=== Republican primary ===
==== Nominee ====
- Melissa Brown, ophthalmologist and previous candidate for Congress

==== Eliminated in primary ====
- Ellen Bard, member of the Pennsylvania House of Representatives
- Al Taubenberger, former Philadelphia City Council staff member and president of the Greater Northeast Philadelphia Chamber of Commerce

==== Primary results ====
Republican primary results
Party	Candidate	Votes	%
Republican	Melissa Brown	22,656	38.73
Republican	Ellen Bard	20,341	34.78
Republican	Al Taubenberger	15,492	26.49
Total votes		58,489	100.00

=== General election ===
==== Predictions ====
Source	Ranking	As of
The Cook Political Report	Lean D	October 29, 2004
Sabato's Crystal Ball	Lean D	November 1, 2004

==== Results ====
General Election 2004: Pennsylvania's 13th congressional district
Party	Candidate	Votes	%
Democratic	Allyson Schwartz	171,763	55.75
Republican	Melissa Brown	127,205	41.28
Constitution	John P. McDermott	5,291	1.72
Libertarian	Chuck Moulton	3,865	1.25
Total votes		308,124	100.00

== District 14 ==
2004 Pennsylvania's 14th congressional district election
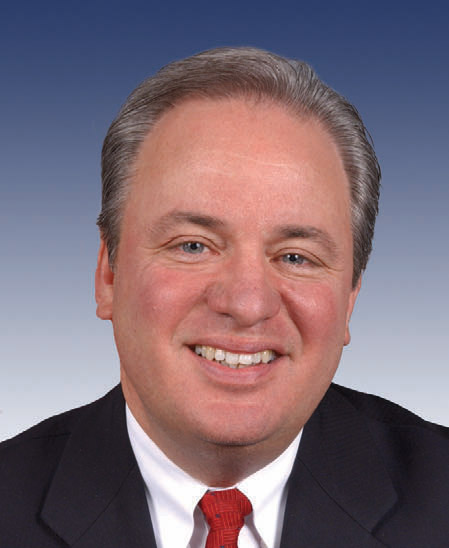
Nominee	Mike Doyle
Party	Democratic
Popular vote	220,139
Percentage	100.00%
U.S. representative before election
Mike Doyle
Democratic
Elected U.S. representative
Mike Doyle
Democratic

=== Democratic primary ===
==== Nominee ====
- Mike Doyle, incumbent U.S. Representative

==== Primary results ====
Democratic primary results
Party	Candidate	Votes	%
Democratic	Mike Doyle (incumbent)	63,033	100.00
Total votes		63,033	100.00

=== General election ===
==== Predictions ====
Source	Ranking	As of
The Cook Political Report	Safe D	October 29, 2004
Sabato's Crystal Ball	Safe D	November 1, 2004

==== Results ====
General Election 2004: Pennsylvania's 14th congressional district
Party	Candidate	Votes	%
Democratic	Mike Doyle (incumbent)	220,139	100.00
Total votes		220,139	100.00

== District 15 ==
2004 Pennsylvania's 15th congressional district election
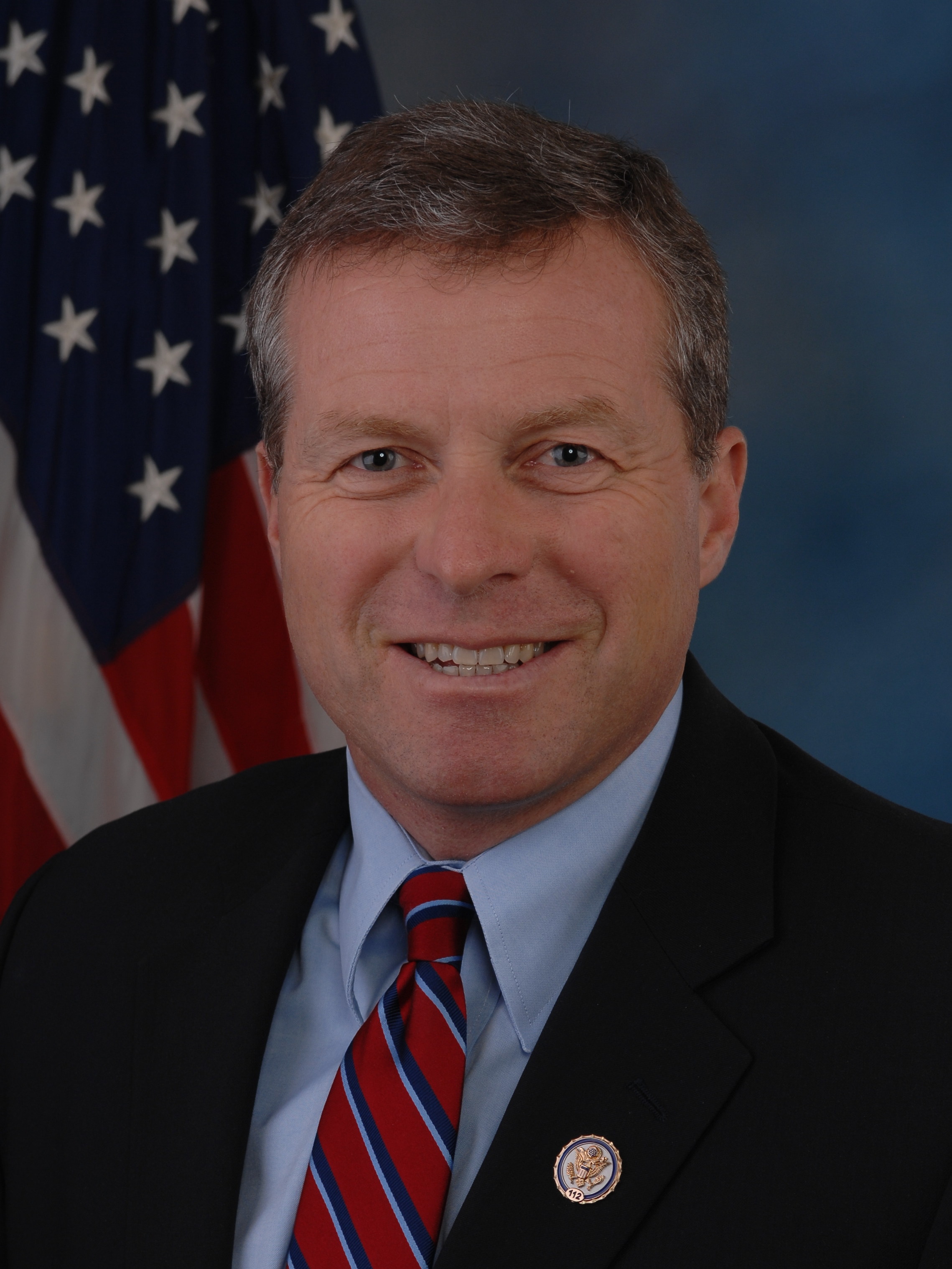

Nominee	Charlie Dent	Joe Driscoll
Party	Republican	Democratic
Popular vote	170,634	114,646
Percentage	58.61%	39.38%
- County results Dent: 50–60% 60–70%
U.S. representative before election
Pat Toomey
Republican
Elected U.S. representative
Charlie Dent
Republican

=== Democratic primary ===
==== Nominee ====
- Joe Driscoll

==== Eliminated in primary ====
- Richard J. Orloski, candidate in the 1996 Pennsylvania State Treasurer election

==== Primary results ====
Democratic primary results
Party	Candidate	Votes	%
Democratic	Joe Driscoll	18,768	56.36
Democratic	Richard J. Orloski	14,535	43.64
Total votes		33,303	100.00

=== Republican primary ===
==== Nominee ====
- Charlie Dent, member of the Pennsylvania State Senate

==== Eliminated in primary ====
- Brian O'Neill
- Joe Pascuzzo

==== Primary results ====
Republican primary results
Party	Candidate	Votes	%
Republican	Charlie Dent	25,376	51.50
Republican	Joe Pascuzzo	16,152	32.78
Republican	Brian O'Neill	7,749	15.72
Total votes		49,277	100.00

=== General election ===
==== Predictions ====
Source	Ranking	As of
The Cook Political Report	Likely R	October 29, 2004
Sabato's Crystal Ball	Lean R	November 1, 2004

==== Results ====
General Election 2004: Pennsylvania's 15th congressional district
Party	Candidate	Votes	%
Republican	Charlie Dent	170,634	58.61
Democratic	Joe Driscoll	114,646	39.38
Libertarian	Richard J. Piotrowski	3,660	1.26
Green	Greta Browne	2,194	0.75
Total votes		291,134	100.00

== District 16 ==
2004 Pennsylvania's 16th congressional district election
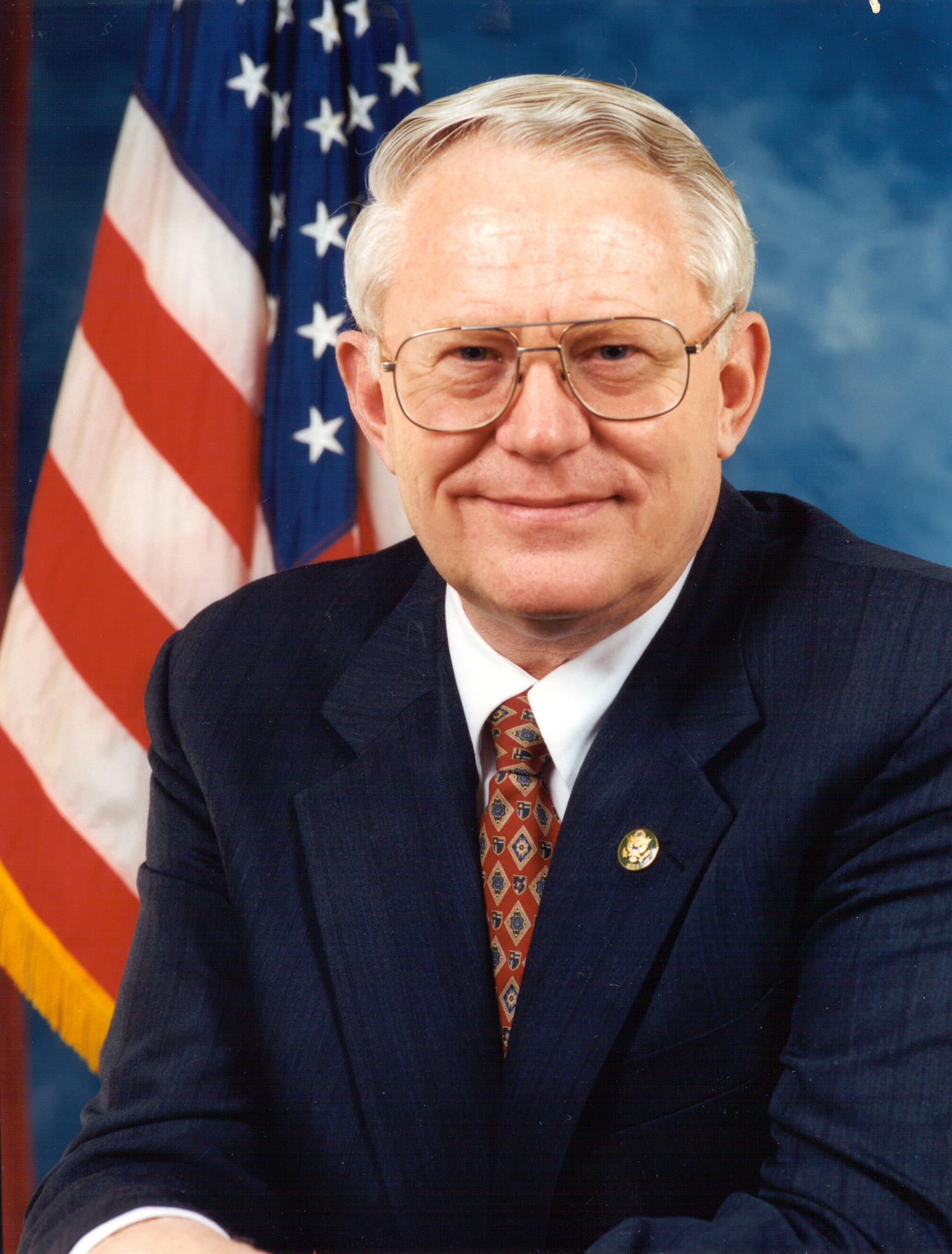

Nominee	Joe Pitts	Lois Herr
Party	Republican	Democratic
Popular vote	183,620	98,410
Percentage	64.36%	34.49%
- County results Pitts: 50–60% 60–70% Herr: 50–60%
U.S. representative before election
Joe Pitts
Republican
Elected U.S. representative
Joe Pitts
Republican

=== Democratic primary ===
==== Nominee ====
- Lois Herr, activist

==== Primary results ====
Democratic primary results
Party	Candidate	Votes	%
Democratic	Lois Herr	12,522	100.00
Total votes		12,522	100.00

=== Republican primary ===
==== Nominee ====
- Joe Pitts, incumbent U.S. Representative

==== Primary results ====
Republican primary results
Party	Candidate	Votes	%
Republican	Joe Pitts (incumbent)	54,345	100.00
Total votes		54,345	100.00

=== General election ===
==== Predictions ====
Source	Ranking	As of
The Cook Political Report	Safe R	October 29, 2004
Sabato's Crystal Ball	Safe R	November 1, 2004

==== Results ====
General Election 2004: Pennsylvania's 16th congressional district
Party	Candidate	Votes	%
Republican	Joe Pitts (incumbent)	183,620	64.36
Democratic	Lois Herr	98,410	34.49
Green	William R. Hagen	3,269	1.15
Total votes		285,299	100.00

== District 17 ==
2004 Pennsylvania's 17th congressional district election
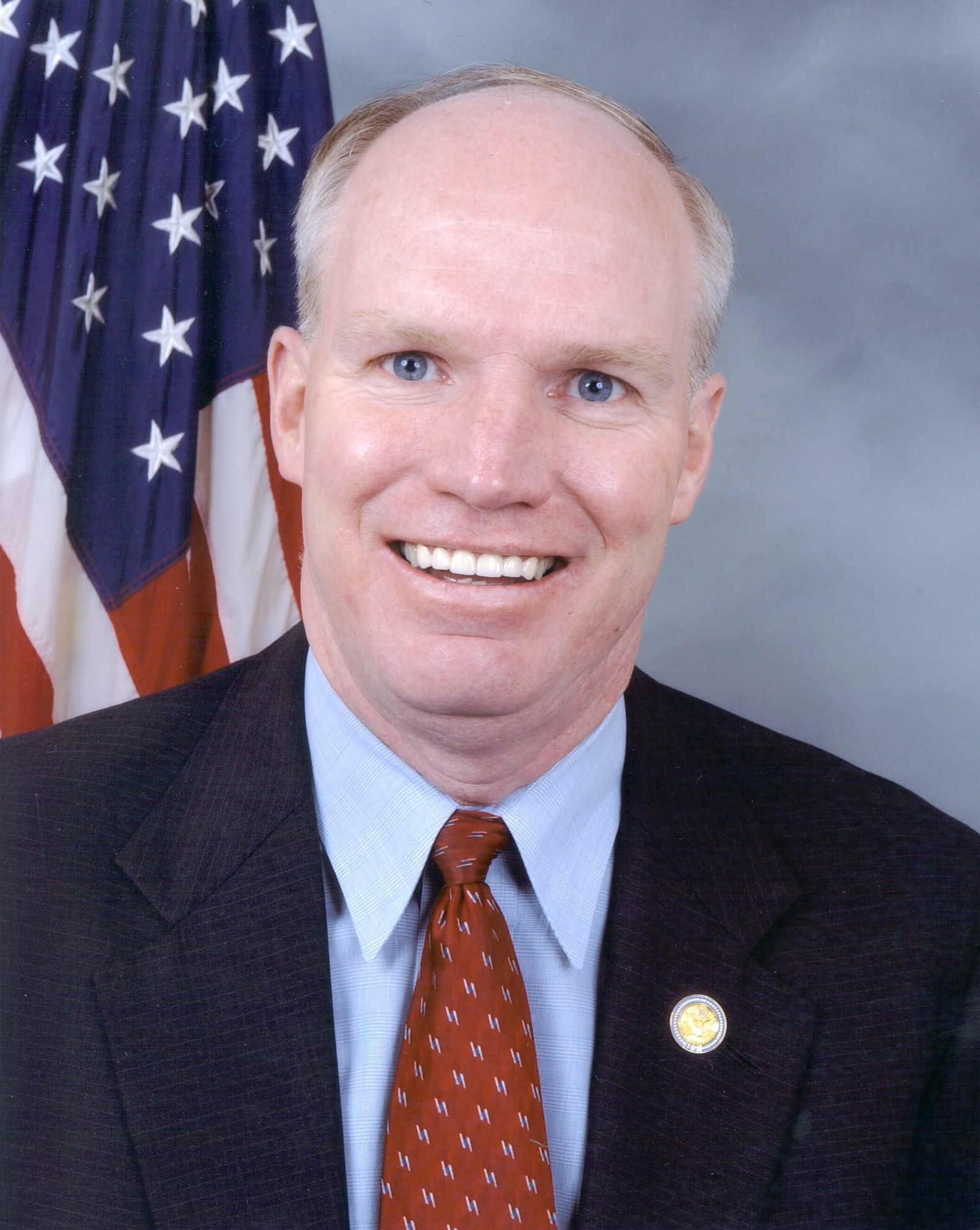

Nominee	Tim Holden	Scott Paterno
Party	Democratic	Republican
Popular vote	172,412	113,592
Percentage	59.09%	38.93%
- County results Holden: 50–60% 70–80% Paterno: 40–50% 50–60%
U.S. representative before election
Tim Holden
Democratic
Elected U.S. representative
Tim Holden
Democratic

=== Democratic primary ===
==== Nominee ====
- Tim Holden, incumbent U.S. Representative

==== Primary results ====
Democratic primary results
Party	Candidate	Votes	%
Democratic	Tim Holden (incumbent)	31,127	100.00
Total votes		31,127	100.00

=== Republican primary ===
==== Nominee ====
- Scott Paterno, son of Penn State Nittany Lions football coach Joe Paterno

==== Eliminated in primary ====
- Susan C. Helm
- Ron Hostetler, schoolteacher
- William B. Lynch
- Frank Ryan
- Mark Stewart

==== Primary results ====
Republican primary results
Party	Candidate	Votes	%
Republican	Scott Paterno	19,258	26.78
Republican	Ron Hostetler	15,370	21.37
Republican	William B. Lynch	12,172	16.92
Republican	Susan C. Helm	9,128	12.69
Republican	Frank Ryan	9,061	12.60
Republican	Mark Stewart	6,935	9.64
Total votes		71,924	100.00

=== General election ===
==== Predictions ====
Source	Ranking	As of
The Cook Political Report	Likely D	October 29, 2004
Sabato's Crystal Ball	Lean D	November 1, 2004

==== Results ====
General Election 2004: Pennsylvania's 17th congressional district
Party	Candidate	Votes	%
Democratic	Tim Holden (incumbent)	172,412	59.09
Republican	Scott Paterno	113,592	38.93
Libertarian	Russ Diamond	5,782	1.98
Total votes		291,786	100.00

== District 18 ==
2004 Pennsylvania's 18th congressional district election
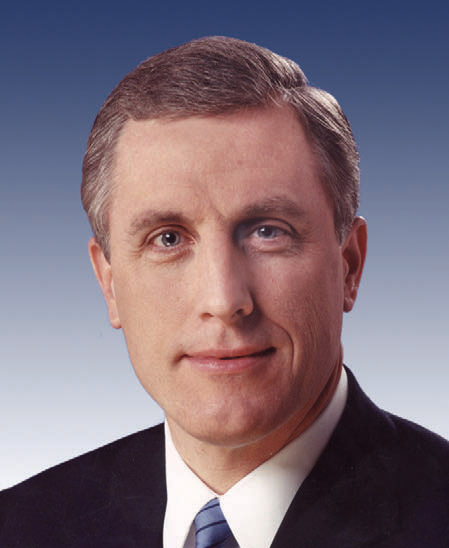

Nominee	Tim Murphy	Mark Boles
Party	Republican	Democratic
Popular vote	197,894	117,420
Percentage	62.76%	37.24%
- County results Murphy: 60–70%
U.S. representative before election
Tim Murphy
Republican
Elected U.S. representative
Tim Murphy
Republican

=== Democratic primary ===
==== Nominee ====
- Mark G. Boles

==== Primary results ====
Democratic primary results
Party	Candidate	Votes	%
Democratic	Mark G. Boles	42,743	100.00
Total votes		42,743	100.00

=== Republican primary ===
==== Nominee ====
- Tim Murphy, incumbent U.S. Representative

==== Primary results ====
Republican primary results
Party	Candidate	Votes	%
Republican	Tim Murphy (incumbent)	47,737	100.00
Total votes		47,737	100.00

=== General election ===
==== Predictions ====
Source	Ranking	As of
The Cook Political Report	Safe R	October 29, 2004
Sabato's Crystal Ball	Safe R	November 1, 2004

==== Results ====
General Election 2004: Pennsylvania's 18th congressional district
Party	Candidate	Votes	%
Republican	Tim Murphy (incumbent)	197,894	62.76
Democratic	Mark G. Boles	117,420	37.24
Total votes		315,314	100.00

== District 19 ==
2004 Pennsylvania's 19th congressional district election
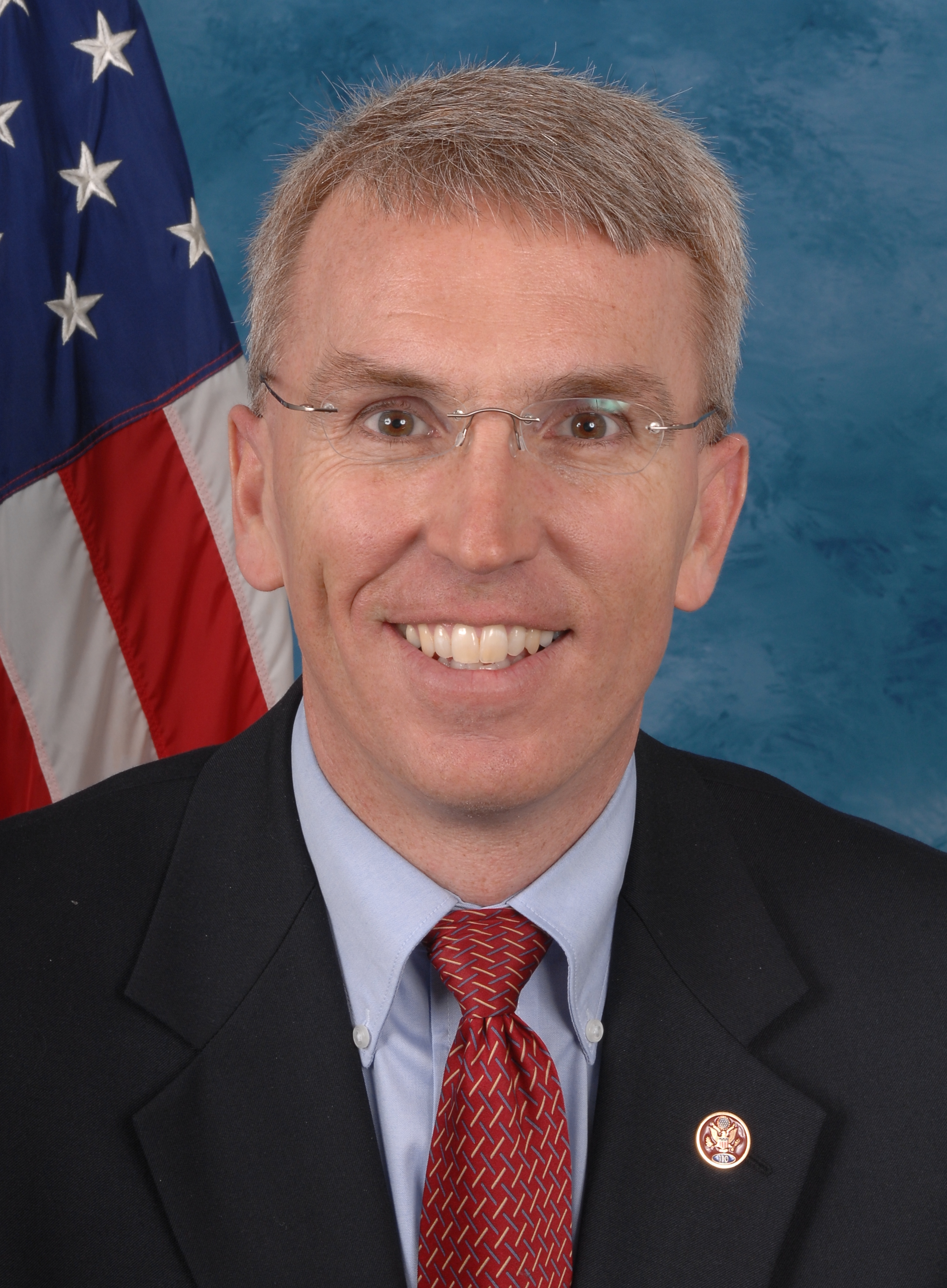
Nominee	Todd Platts
Party	Republican
Popular vote	224,274
Percentage	91.50%
- County results Platts: 80–90% 90–100%
U.S. representative before election
Todd Platts
Republican
Elected U.S. representative
Todd Platts
Republican

=== Republican primary ===
==== Nominee ====
- Todd Platts, incumbent U.S. Representative

==== Primary results ====
Republican primary results
Party	Candidate	Votes	%
Republican	Todd Platts (incumbent)	65,207	100.00
Total votes		65,207	100.00

=== General election ===
==== Predictions ====
Source	Ranking	As of
The Cook Political Report	Safe R	October 29, 2004
Sabato's Crystal Ball	Safe R	November 1, 2004

==== Results ====
General Election 2004: Pennsylvania's 19th congressional district
Party	Candidate	Votes	%
Republican	Todd Platts (incumbent)	224,274	91.50
Green	Charles J. Steel	8,890	3.63
Libertarian	Michael Paoletta	8,456	3.45
Constitution	Lester B. Searer	3,474	1.42
Total votes		245,094	100.00

== See also ==
- Pennsylvania's congressional delegations
