= Better Medicare Alliance =

American advocacy coalition

- Formation: 2014
- Headquarters: Washington, D.C.
- President and CEO: Mary Beth Donahue
- Website: https://bettermedicarealliance.org/

Better Medicare Alliance (BMA) is an American 501(c)(4) non-profit advocacy coalition that promotes Medicare Advantage, a private health insurance option available to Medicare beneficiaries.

The organization was created in 2014. In 2015, former U.S. Representative Allyson Schwartz was named President and CEO. She served for six years before announcing her retirement. In June 2021, Mary Beth Donahue was named President and CEO.

== Leadership ==
=== President and CEO ===
Mary Beth Donahue

=== Board members ===
- Kenneth E. Thorpe
- Elena Rios

== Members ==
Founding members of the coalition include the Healthcare Leadership Council, Healthways, Humana, The Latino Coalition, The National Caucus and Center on Black Aging, the National Hispanic Medical Association, the National Association of Manufacturers, the National Retail Federation, the Population Health Alliance, UnitedHealth Group, and the U.S. Chamber of Commerce.
