= Allyson Schwartz =

American politician (born 1948)

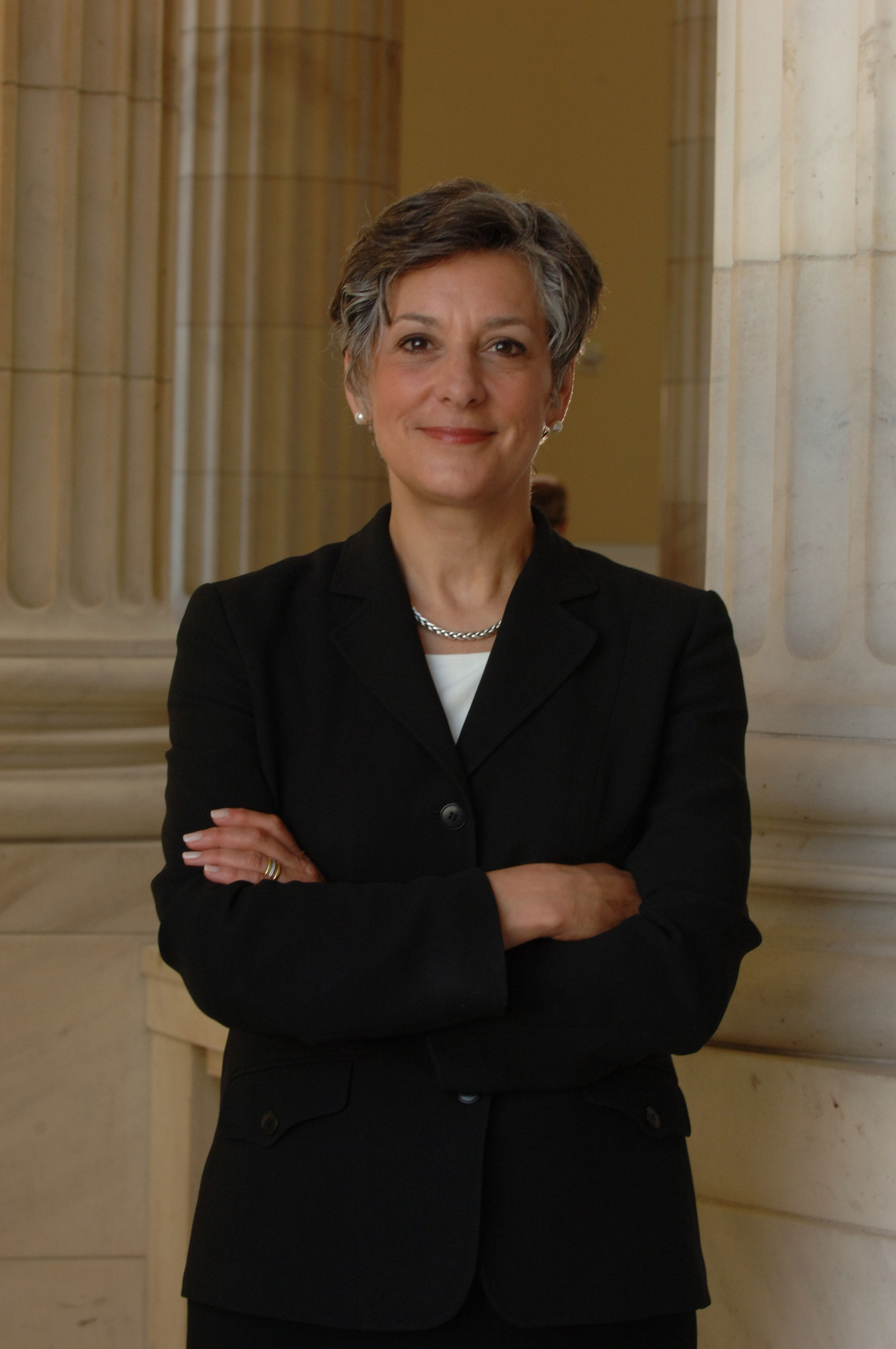

Member of the U.S. House of Representatives from Pennsylvania's 13th district
- In office January 3, 2005 – January 3, 2015
- Preceded by: Joe Hoeffel
- Succeeded by: Brendan Boyle

Member of the Pennsylvania Senate from the 4th district
- In office January 1, 1991 – January 3, 2005
- Preceded by: Joe Rocks
- Succeeded by: LeAnna Washington

Personal details
- Born: Allyson Young; October 3, 1948 (age 77) New York City, New York, U.S.
- Party: Democratic
- Spouse: David Schwartz
- Children: 2
- Education: Simmons University (BA); Bryn Mawr College (MSW)

Allyson Schwartz (née Young; born October 3, 1948) is an American Democratic Party politician who represented parts of Montgomery County and Northeast Philadelphia in the United States House of Representatives from 2005 to 2015 and Northeast and Northwest Philadelphia in the Pennsylvania Senate from 1991 to 2005. She has finished second in a statewide Democratic Party primary twice: for United States Senate in 2000 and for Governor in 2014.

Schwartz was also National Chair for Recruitment and Candidate Services for the Democratic Congressional Campaign Committee.

== Early life, education, and health care career ==
Schwartz was born Allyson Young in Queens, New York, to Everett and Renee (née Perl) Young. Her mother left Vienna in 1938 after Germany annexed Austria, and came to the United States, where she settled at a Jewish foster home in Philadelphia. Her father was a dentist in Flushing, Queens, and a veteran of the Korean War. She has a brother, Neal, and two sisters, Nancy and Dale. Schwartz graduated from the Calhoun School, on the Upper West Side of New York City, in 1966 and then enrolled at Simmons College in Boston, Massachusetts. She earned a Bachelor of Arts degree in sociology from Simmons in 1970, as well as a Master of Social Work degree from Bryn Mawr College in 1972.

She worked as assistant director of the Philadelphia Health Services Department from 1972 to 1975, and executive director of the Elizabeth Blackwell Center, a reproductive health clinic in Philadelphia, from 1975 to 1988.

== Pennsylvania Senate ==
=== Electoral history ===
In 1990, Schwartz ran for Pennsylvania's 4th senate seat, based in Northwest and Northeast Philadelphia. She won the Democratic primary with 50% of the vote, defeating Jeff Blum (28%) and Robert Blasi (22%). In the general election, Schwartz defeated incumbent Republican State Senator Joe Rocks 58%–42%.

Redistricting pushed Schwartz's seat into Montgomery County. In 1994, she won re-election to a second term by defeating Republican Tom Scott 82%–18%. In 1998, she won re-election to a third term unopposed. In 2002, she won re-election to a fourth term defeating Republican Ron Holt, the Montgomery County Register of Wills, 82%–18%.

=== Tenure ===
During her first term, Schwartz was instrumental in Pennsylvania's legislative efforts to provide health care coverage to the children of middle-class families, leading to the creation of the Children's Health Insurance Program (CHIP) in 1992. CHIP served as the model for the federal plan that now provides health insurance to millions of children.

In a 2002 PoliticsPA feature story designating politicians with yearbook superlatives, she was named the "Best Dressed," to which she responded "I appreciate the honor...it must be the scarves."

== 2000 U.S. Senate election ==
In 2000, she decided to challenge Republican U.S. Senator Rick Santorum. Pittsburgh-area U.S. Congressman Ron Klink won the crowded, six-candidate Democratic primary with a plurality of 41% of the vote. Schwartz ranked second with 27% of the vote, dominating the southeastern part of the state, most notably Philadelphia (60%) and Montgomery (62%) counties. She also won two counties outside of the region: Centre (33%) and Union (38%). However, this was not enough to overcome Klink's dominance in the western part of the state. Schwartz did not have to give up her state senate seat to run in the Democratic primary for the U. S. Senate; Pennsylvania state senators serve staggered four-year terms, and Schwartz was not up for reelection until 2002.

== Congress election history ==
In 2003, Democratic U.S. Congressman Joe Hoeffel, of Pennsylvania's 13th congressional district decided not to run for a fourth term, in order to challenge Republican U.S. Senator Arlen Specter. Schwartz had originally planned to run for Auditor General, but changed her plans after Hoeffel's announcement. In early 2004, she moved from Philadelphia to Jenkintown, Pennsylvania in Montgomery County. She won the Democratic primary, narrowly defeating former Philadelphia deputy mayor and National Constitution Center director Joe Torsella 52% to 48%. She won 62% of Montgomery while Torsella won 57% of Philadelphia. While most former state legislators raise comparatively more money through PACs than individual donations, she raised $4,597,032 from individual donations and comparatively little ($558,376) in PAC donations. The 13th had historically been a classic Northeastern "Yankee Republican" district, but had become increasingly Democratic in recent years, especially after it was pushed into Philadelphia after the 2000 census. A Republican presidential candidate has not carried it since 1988, and it has been in Democratic hands for all but four years since 1993. In the general election, she defeated Republican Melissa Brown 56% to 41%, winning both counties.

In 2006, Schwartz was re-elected to a second term, defeating Raj Bhakta, a contestant on The Apprentice 2, 66% to 34%. In 2008, she was re-elected to a third term, defeating Republican attorney Marina Kats, 63% to 35%. In 2010, she was reelected a fourth time, defeating businessman Dee Adcock 56% to 44%. The 12-point winning margin was the smallest in her congressional career. In 2012, after redistricting, Schwartz's district was given a larger Democratic majority when it was pushed further into Philadelphia, with 52% of the district's vote cast in Philadelphia. She won re-election to a fifth term, defeating Republican Joe Rooney 69% to 31%.

== House tenure ==
Schwartz was a member of the New Democrat Coalition and was the chair of the New Democrat Coalition Taskforce on Health. In this position, she had actively pushed for the greater use of interoperable and secure electronic prescribing systems throughout the country in an attempt to decrease medical errors as well as costs and liability to providers, health systems and patients. In January 2014, Schwartz resigned from her leadership position in the New Democratic Coalition.

=== Legislation ===
The first piece of legislation Schwartz introduced after being elected to Congress focused on providing tax credits to businesses that hire unemployed veterans. The bill was signed into law in 2007. In 2011, Schwartz introduced the Hiring Our Veterans Act, which was signed into law by President Obama in November of that year. The Hiring Our Veterans Act increased the tax credit for employers that hire veterans with a service connected disability who have been unemployed for six months or more, veterans who have been unemployed for at least four weeks, and veterans, not necessarily with disability, who have been unemployed for at least six months. In 2012, Schwartz introduced the Servicemembers' Access to Justice Act to improve the enforcement of Uniformed Services Employment and Reemployment Rights Act of 1994. Schwartz was backed by Senator Bob Casey, who introduced this legislation in the Senate on May 23, 2012 (Schwartz, 2012).

=== Ethics ===
Schwartz was the first Democratic member of the House of Representatives to call for Rep. Anthony Weiner to resign following his photo scandal.

=== Healthcare ===
Schwartz was known as one of the leading health care experts in government. She authored several key provisions of the Patient Protection and Affordable Care Act, including increasing access to primary care, banning pre-existing conditions exclusions and allowing young adults to remain on their parent's health coverage. She is pro-choice and received a 100% rating from NARAL in 2011. She voted twice against Republican-led efforts to defund Planned Parenthood, and supported legislation requiring hospitals to provide emergency abortion care to women who could die without it.

== 2014 gubernatorial election ==
Schwartz announced her intention to give up her House seat to challenge incumbent Republican Pennsylvania Governor Tom Corbett, who was up for re-election in 2014. On April 8, 2013, Schwartz officially launched her campaign. In February 2013, Schwartz stated that she would not run for re-election for the United States House of Representatives. Ultimately, she was defeated by Tom Wolf in the Democratic primary.

== Later career ==
After losing the Democratic primary for governor of Pennsylvania, Schwartz became the president and CEO of the Better Medicare Alliance, a nonprofit advocacy group funded by health insurance companies. The organization has been criticized as a front group for the health insurance industry. She left the group in January 2021 after 6 years at the helm.

== Personal life ==
Schwartz is married to David Schwartz, a cardiologist, and they live in Jenkintown, Pennsylvania. They have two sons.

== See also ==
- List of Jewish members of the United States Congress
- Women in the United States House of Representatives

U.S. House of Representatives
Preceded by Joe Hoeffel	Member of the U.S. House of Representatives from Pennsylvania's 13th congressional district 2005–2015	Succeeded by Brendan Boyle
U.S. order of precedence (ceremonial)
Preceded by Edward G. Biester Jr. as Former U.S. Representative	Order of precedence of the United States as Former U.S. Representative	Succeeded by Leonard Lance as Former U.S. Representative
