= Jim Matthews (politician) =

Montgomery County, Pennsylvania Board

Member of the Montgomery County Board of Commissioners
- In office January 3, 2000 – January 2, 2012
- Preceded by: Mario Mele
- Succeeded by: Leslie Richards

Personal details
- Party: Republican
- Relations: Chris Matthews (brother)
- Education: College of the Holy Cross (BA)

James R. Matthews is an American politician from the state of Pennsylvania, and is a member of the Republican Party. He is a former member of the Montgomery County Board of Commissioners, and was the unsuccessful 2006 Republican nominee for Lieutenant Governor of Pennsylvania as Lynn Swann's running mate.

== Personal life ==
After attending La Salle College High School, Matthews graduated from the College of the Holy Cross in Worcester, Massachusetts, on a U.S. Navy scholarship. After serving in the Navy, Matthews entered the mortgage business and later earned an appointment as a mortgage lending officer with the Veterans Administration (VA) in Philadelphia. After leaving the VA, he returned to the private sector and later started his own mortgage business in 1990. Matthews is the brother of former MSNBC talk-show host Chris Matthews.

== Political career ==
=== Early involvement in politics ===
Matthews was first elected to the Board of Commissioners in 1999 with District Attorney Michael Marino. In the 1999 primary election Matthews defeated Mario Mele, whom Republicans had accused of making a power sharing deal with the third commissioner, Democrat Joe Hoeffel, and supporting higher taxes in exchange for the commission chairmanship.

In 2003, Matthews ran with Tom Ellis for the county commission. Facing incumbent Ruth Damsker and Frank Custer, the pair won, but with a narrower margin, less than 10,000 votes, than Republicans were accustomed to.

Matthews courted some controversy in 2005 when he led an effort to ban cigarette smokers from working for the County. He and the commissioners reasoned that by outlawing smoking by County employees, they would be able to reduce health benefit costs. Later that year, the Commission retreated from that position, citing potential legal concerns. Montgomery County now offers anti-smoking aids to its employees as well as cash bonuses for those who stop smoking.

In 2006, he declared his candidacy for lieutenant governor. Lynn Swann endorsed him for the position and he subsequently won the May primary unopposed. In the fall general election however, Swann and Matthews were defeated by Democratic incumbent Ed Rendell, garnering only 39% of the vote.

In 2007, Matthews made a third, successful bid for the commission. Early in the campaign, Matthews and Ellis were opposed for the Republican nomination by State Representative Kate Harper, former Lower Merion School Board member Jill Govberg, District Attorney Bruce Castor and former State Representative Melissa Murphy Weber. The challengers charged that Matthews and Ellis could not keep the county government in GOP hands in the upcoming election. Matthews countered that he could indeed win given his experience in county government and his name recognition. Running on his own, Matthews narrowly captured the party endorsement finishing behind Castor.

Matthews and Castor faced off with Hoeffel, who sought to return to the commission after a stint in Congress, and incumbent Ruth Damsker in the general election. Matthews was attacked for support from Bob Asher and a lobbying contract awarded to party chairman Ken Davis. Matthews raised a campaign account separate from Castor and counterattacked Hoeffel and Damsker with charges that they would raise property taxes.

On election day, Castor, Hoeffel and Matthews were all nominated, with the latter edging the incumbent Ruth Damsker by just over 6000 votes. Matthews received the lowest vote tally of the three. Matthews was, until his arrest, Chairman of the Board of Commissioners following a power sharing agreement with, ironically, his fellow candidate Hoeffel. Matthews was formally censured by the Montgomery County Republican Committee (MCRC) on November 17, 2008 for his deal with Hoeffel, with the MCRC Chairman Robert Kerns declaring Matthews was "no longer a Republican".

=== Legal and political issues ===
Despite announcing he would seek a fourth term without party support, Matthews withdrew from the contest, along with Hoeffel, after rumors of alleged violations of state Sunshine laws and awarding of no-bid contracts surfaced. A subsequent grand jury investigation was critical of both Hoeffel and Matthews over their discussions of county business over private breakfast meetings. Matthews was later arrested and charged with perjury. The day of his arrest, Matthews resigned as Chairman but not as Commissioner. Hoeffel and Castor summarily fired county solicitor Barry Miller, a close friend and ally of Matthews, who also served as Matthews' campaign treasurer and closest advisor. Castor nominated Hoeffel to the position of Chairman ruefully saying he did not want the chair for himself by likening the post to becoming "Captain of the Titanic after it hit the iceberg." Matthews did not attend the public meeting where these actions took place. Hoeffel and Castor further ordered staff to consider how to remove Matthews from any boards or commissions on which he serves at the pleasure of the commission. Matthews subsequently resigned from all these positions after news accounts reported Hoeffel and Castor's intention to remove him.

Matthews subsequently agreed to be placed into an accelerated rehabilitative disposition program for nonviolent offenders. He will serve a year of probation on one charge of perjury, after which time his record can be wiped clean of the perjury charge if he remains out of trouble. Matthews will also be forced to testify in a lawsuit against the county's contractor, XSPAND, for delinquent tax collections. The lawsuit, brought by a competitive firm, MRS, alleges that Matthews and Ellis, while they were Commissioners, improperly steered county business to XSPAND and pressured the borough of Norristown to hire it as well. They are also accused of improperly sharing confidential information with former Governor Mark Schweiker, a lobbyist for the firm. Matthews and Ellis countered that the contract generated significant savings in delinquent tax collection costs.

== Electoral history ==
1999 Montgomery County Board of Commissioners (top three elected)
Party	Candidate	Votes	%	±%
Republican	Michael Marino	76,878	31.79	
Republican	Jim Matthews	74,752	30.91	
Democratic	Ruth Damsker	47,580	19.68	
Democratic	Wendell Young	42,605	17.62	

2003 Montgomery County Board of Commissioners (top three elected)
Party	Candidate	Votes	%	±%
Republican	Jim Matthews	78,808	27.43	
Republican	Tom Ellis	76,443	26.61	
Democratic	Ruth Damsker	68,552	23.86	
Democratic	Frank Custer	63,520	22.11	

2006 Pennsylvania Gubernatorial Election
Party	Candidate	Votes	%
Democratic	Ed Rendell Catherine Baker Knoll	2,470,517	60.33
Republican	Lynn Swann Jim Matthews	1,622,135	39.61
Write-In	—	2,670	0.06
Total votes		4,014,109	100.00
Turnout			50.05

2007 Montgomery County Board of Commissioners (top three elected)
Party	Candidate	Votes	%	±%
Republican	Bruce Castor	85,340	26.96	
Democratic	Joe Hoeffel	79,276	25.05	
Republican	Jim Matthews	78,958	24.95	
Democratic	Ruth Damsker	72,889	23.03	

Political offices
Preceded by Mario Mele	Member of the Montgomery County Board of Commissioners; 2000–2012	Succeeded by Leslie Richards
Party political offices
Preceded by Jane Earll	Republican nominee for Lieutenant Governor of Pennsylvania; 2006	Succeeded by Jim Cawley
