= Bruce Castor =

American lawyer and politician (born 1961)

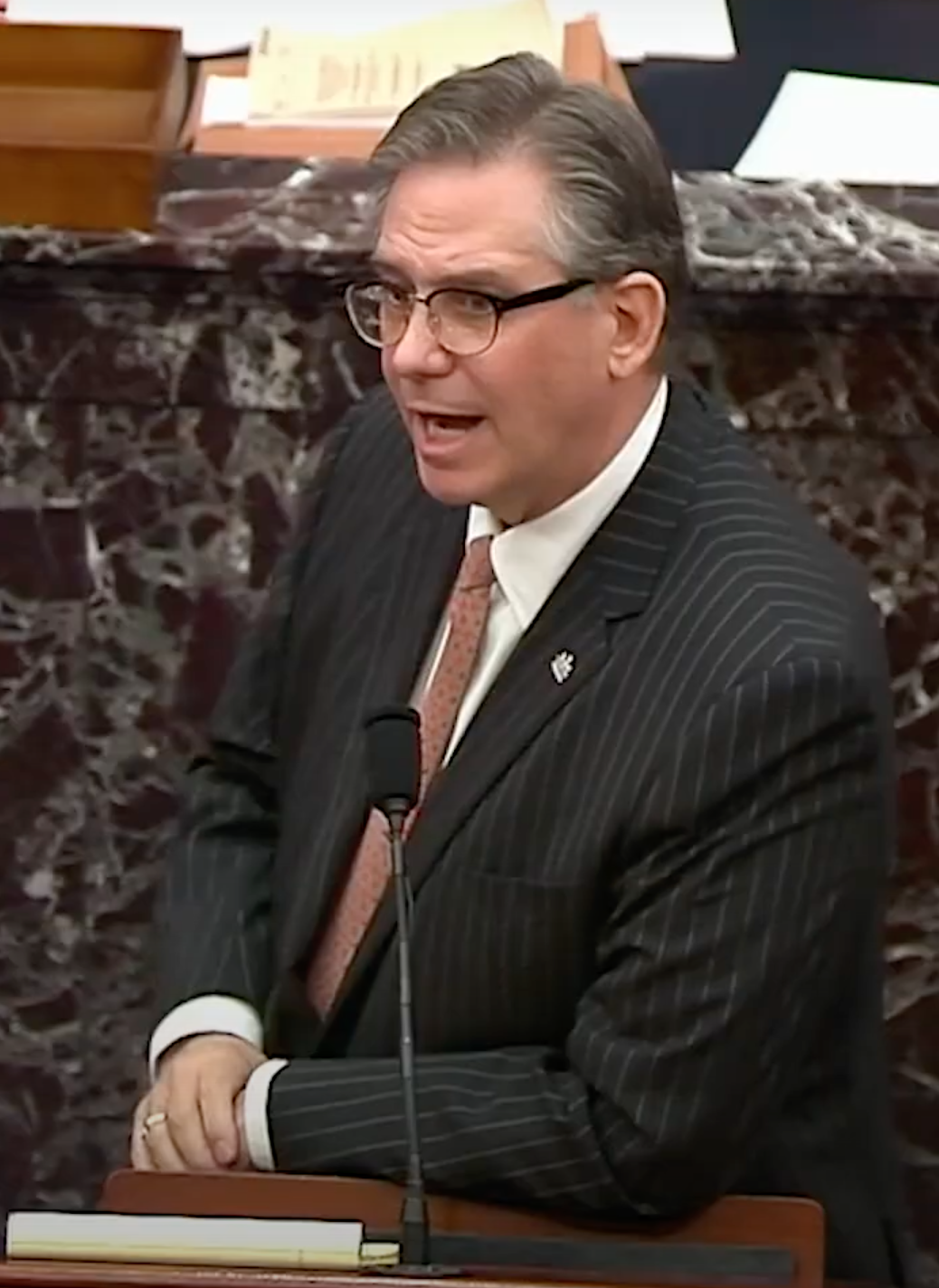
- Castor presenting at Donald Trump's impeachment trial in 2021

Attorney General of Pennsylvania
- Acting; August 17, 2016 – August 31, 2016
- Governor: Tom Wolf
- Preceded by: Kathleen Kane
- Succeeded by: Bruce Beemer

Solicitor General of Pennsylvania
- In office March 21, 2016 – September 9, 2016
- Governor: Tom Wolf
- Preceded by: Position established
- Succeeded by: Stephen Raiola

Member of the Montgomery County Board of Commissioners
- In office January 7, 2008 – January 4, 2016
- Preceded by: Tom Ellis
- Succeeded by: Joe Gale

District Attorney of Montgomery County
- In office January 3, 2000 – January 7, 2008
- Preceded by: Michael D. Marino
- Succeeded by: Risa Vetri Ferman

Personal details
- Born: Bruce Lee Castor Jr. October 24, 1961 (age 65) Abington, Pennsylvania, U.S.
- Party: Republican
- Spouse: Elizabeth Pierce (m. 1989)
- Children: 2
- Education: Lafayette College (AB); Washington and Lee University (JD)
- Occupation: Attorney

Bruce Lee Castor Jr. (born October 24, 1961) is an American lawyer and former Republican politician from Montgomery County, Pennsylvania. He was appointed as the first Solicitor General of Pennsylvania in March 2016, and also first deputy attorney general the following July. Castor became acting state attorney general less than a month later. He investigated the Penn State fraternity hazing scandal and led for the defense of the second impeachment trial of Donald Trump along with lawyers William J Brennan, David I. Schoen, and Michael T. van der Veen.

== Early life and education ==
Bruce Lee Castor Jr. was born on October 24, 1961 in Abington, Pennsylvania to parents Bruce Lee Castor Sr. and Diane (née Shaffer) Castor. He was raised in Abington. His father was an attorney and longtime partner at the Philadelphia law firm Ballard Spahr.

Castor attended Chestnut Hill Academy in Philadelphia, graduating in 1979. He subsequently attended Lafayette College, graduating in 1983 with a Bachelor of Arts in government and law. He attended Washington and Lee University School of Law, receiving his Juris Doctor degree in 1986.

== Statewide profile ==
After serving stints beginning in 1981 with, respectively, the Philadelphia District Attorney's Office, the Northampton County District Attorney's Office, as an LBJ Congressional Scholar (Washington, DC), and defending Federal prisoners at FPC-Alderson, Castor began his professional career as an assistant district attorney in 1985 before becoming district attorney of Montgomery County from 2000 to 2008. He next took a seat on the Montgomery County Board of Commissioners, an elected position he held until January 4, 2016, when he was succeeded by Joe Gale. Castor was defeated for re-election as Montgomery County's District Attorney in November 2015. Castor completed a nearly three-year term as a special assistant district attorney of Centre County, Pennsylvania on December 31, 2017, followed by an appointment as a special assistant district attorney of Susquehanna County, Pennsylvania on January 6, 2018. On March 29, 2016, Pennsylvania Attorney General Kathleen Kane announced Castor's appointment (back-dated to March 21, when he actually took office) to the newly created position of Solicitor General of Pennsylvania. While he operated freely as the de facto Attorney General and was widely recognized as such, Castor formally became the state's Acting Attorney General, replacing Kane, who resigned on August 17, 2016, following a conviction of a third degree felony perjury charge and several related misdemeanors. Governor Tom Wolf later nominated Bruce Beemer to fulfill the remaining balance of Kane's term which expired in January 2017. Castor is the cousin of Steve Castor, who represented Trump during his first impeachment.

== Career ==
=== Montgomery County District Attorney (2000–2008) ===
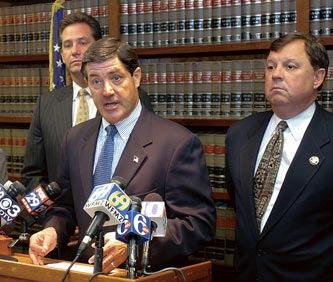
Castor at a press conference with Jim Gerlach and John Durante in 2007

After serving in the office since 1985, Castor was twice elected district attorney for Montgomery County, in which he is a lifelong resident, assuming office in January 2000. After his second term ended, he was succeeded by Risa Vetri Ferman. When she sought (and won) election as judge in November 2015, Castor sought to return to that office, but lost to Ferman's first assistant, Kevin Steele, who ran an 11th-hour campaign contending Castor should have charged entertainer Bill Cosby in 2005. Castor countered that Steele could have arrested Cosby himself in the intervening years if he believed credible evidence existed to do so. A week before the election, Andrea Constand, who had accused Cosby of sexual assault in Montgomery County, sued Castor, claiming he defamed her by intimating she was not credible. The Washington Post said that this suit contributed to Castor's defeat. In November 2017, Castor sued Constand and her lawyers for defamation, charging that the lawsuit and its timing were retaliatory and ruined his political career. In 2017, Cosby stood trial, but the trial ended in a hung jury with jurors unable to agree on Cosby's guilt beyond a reasonable doubt, as Castor had predicted in 2005 would happen if he had elected to charge Cosby. However at Cosby's retrial he was convicted on all three counts and he was sentenced to serve 3 to 10 years in prison. After two years of time served the Pennsylvania Supreme Court overturned the sentence, ruling that Castor's pledge to not prosecute Cosby was binding on all other prosecutors.

==== Notable cases ====
- Bill Cosby – Castor declined to prosecute Cosby for sexual assault in 2005 after he found "insufficient, credible and admissible evidence exists upon which any charge against Mr. Cosby could be sustained beyond a reasonable doubt". In November 2014 and through the November 2015 election, Castor's decision was heavily criticized, especially when other women came forward to accuse Cosby. Castor, however, assessed that none of these women known to him at the time would have been allowed to testify, making them legally irrelevant to the question of whether Castor should have arrested Cosby. On December 30, 2015, with the statute of limitations about to expire, Cosby was charged with felony sexual assault. At a preliminary hearing on February 2, 2016, Castor testified that he made a promise to never prosecute Cosby for the incident, but Judge Steven T. O'Neill ruled that the promise was not legally binding on the current district attorney, and ordered that the criminal case proceed. O'Neill further found that only Castor's word and no other evidence supported his contention and that the deal had never been memorialized in writing, and Castor was ultimately not a credible witness. O'Neill's ruling was reversed by the Pennsylvania Supreme Court on June 30, 2021, which held that Castor's non-prosecution pledge was in fact binding on Cosby's prosecutor; this ruling resulted in the overturning of Cosby's conviction and his release from prison. The court that Castor's decision to announce publicly that no prosecution would take place "was made deliberately to induce the deprivation of a fundamental right"— namely, Cosby's Fifth Amendment protection against self-incrimination, forcing him to testify in Constand's civil suit against him. That testimony formed the basis for the subsequent criminal case.
- Dillon Cossey – Planned a Columbine-style attack on a local high school. Cossey was convicted in juvenile court.
- John Eichinger – The most prolific arrested serial killer documented in Montgomery County history. Eichinger murdered three young women and a small child. Two of the women had rejected his sexual advances and the other woman and child were witnesses. Eichinger received three death sentences and one sentence of life in prison. The case formed the basis for the production of a demo video for a proposed television show based on Castor's career called "Probable Cause", written and produced in 2007 by then Times Herald reporter Keith Phucas in Norristown, Pennsylvania.
- Caleb Fairley – Fairley sexually assaulted and murdered a mother and her child in his parents' shop in 1995, earning a double life sentence. The case was the first time DNA evidence was used to convict a killer in Montgomery County. The Fairley case formed the basis for the book Vampire Trap by Katherine Ramsland. Castor is featured on the episode of Forensic Files ("Shopping Spree") devoted to the case.
- Bruce Godschalk – Godschalk was convicted of rape in 1987 (before Castor was elected) and was freed in 2002 after DNA tests cast doubt on his guilt. Castor had fought against DNA testing, arguing that Godschalk did not have the legal right to it. Godschalk filed a lawsuit against the county, which was settled for approximately $1 million. In 2009, the United States Supreme Court ruled 5–4 in a similar case that convicts did not have a constitutional right to DNA testing.
- Craig Rabinowitz – Rabinowitz murdered his wife, Stefanie Newman, in 1997 for the life insurance money to pay debts arising from a pyramid scheme, and to leave him free to pursue his obsession with a stripper. The case was front-page news for months and became the subject of multiple television programs and a book by Ken Englade called Everybody's Best Friend. He pleaded guilty to first degree murder and is serving a life sentence.
- Rafael Robb – Robb, a University of Pennsylvania professor of game theory, was accused of murdering his wife in a rage. Pleaded guilty to voluntary manslaughter and was sentenced to 5–10 years in prison, a sentence many believe was too lenient, with Castor arguing for a 20-year prison term.
- Guy Sileo – Sileo murdered his business partner in the General Wayne Inn, serving a life sentence for first degree murder. A highly circumstantial case, the "General Wayne Inn murder" has been the subject of numerous television portrayals.

=== 2004 Pennsylvania Attorney general Campaign ===
Castor ran for the GOP nomination for Pennsylvania Attorney General in 2004 against Republican Tom Corbett. Furious that he had lost endorsements of the southeastern GOP chairmen, Castor attacked Corbett and the county chairmen with allegations of backroom deals with Bob Asher, the state's national GOP committeeman. Castor and Asher had feuded for several years due to Asher's prior felony convictions for perjury, bribery, racketeering, and conspiracy in 1986 in the context of a political corruption scandal which also involved the State Treasurer, R. Budd Dwyer, leading to Dwyer's committing suicide at a press conference before his sentencing. Asher had been state GOP Chair during the scandal and was convicted for participating in the bribery of Dwyer. Asher's criminal past, connected to a political bribery scheme while he was the Republican state chair, became a subject of the campaign for the state's top law enforcement post.

Castor was unable to produce proof of any conspiracy against him and ran without the party endorsement in all but two counties, his home base in Montgomery County and Monroe County. Castor lost 52.8% to 47.2%, despite winning overwhelmingly the same southeastern counties whose chairmen had repudiated him, and his home in Montgomery County, where he took nearly 82.5% of the vote.

=== Montgomery County commissioner (2008–2016) ===
In 2007, Castor challenged incumbent County Commissioner Tom Ellis, a one-time friend who had chaired Castor's campaigns in 1999 and 2003 but endorsed Corbett in 2004. Early in the campaign, Castor commissioned a poll showing that Ellis, who had been hobbled by negative press surrounding alleged domestic violence incidents, would lose in a general election. Ellis released his own poll to try to refute Castor's charges that he was unelectable. In a six candidate field, Castor won the party endorsement on the first ballot, but his preferred running mate, former State Representative Melissa Murphy Weber, was narrowly defeated by incumbent Jim Matthews on the second ballot.

Initially, Castor was reluctant to run with Matthews saying he believed Matthews was "untrustworthy". However, amid widespread pressure that he would be splitting the party, Castor relented and ran with Matthews against former Democratic Congressman Joe Hoeffel and incumbent commissioner Ruth Damsker in the general election. During the campaign, some of Castor's earlier criticism of Matthews was raised by the Democrats, including financial support to Matthews from Bob Asher. Over Castor's objections who would not accept funds from a convicted felon, Matthews set up a separate campaign account from the Matthews/Castor account in order to collect contributions from Asher. On election day, Castor won, taking first place in the general election setting an electoral record at the time for the position. His running mate placed third, giving the GOP control of the commission. This was the first time in at least 140 years that a Republican failed to capture both the first and the second spot. Castor and Matthews served with Hoeffel, who finished second. It was immediately a rocky relationship with all Castor's earlier predictions about Matthews being "untrustworthy" coming true. Matthews and Hoeffel sided against Castor shutting him out of setting county policy. Castor responded by repeatedly making allegations of corruption against his fellow commissioners charging mismanagement of county finances, the hiring of unqualified people, and in the conduct of county business. A subsequent grand jury report found questionable behavior on Hoeffel's part for his participation in discussing county business at private breakfast meetings held with Matthews and senior aides–an alleged violation of state "sunshine" laws. However, unlike Matthews, who was later arrested for allegedly perjuring himself while testifying to the grand jury, Hoeffel was never charged with criminal wrongdoing. Nevertheless, Matthews and Hoeffel were unable to achieve endorsement for re-election and dropped out of the race, while GOP voters easily re-nominated Castor who was thus vindicated in his allegations of government corruption and mismanagement by Hoeffel and Matthews.

On November 8, 2011, St. Rep. Josh Shapiro, Whitemarsh Twp. Supervisor Leslie Richards, and Castor were elected, marking the first time in county history Democrats controlled two of the three seats on the Board of Commissioners. Shapiro was elected chairman unanimously on nomination from Castor. All three members of the commission later noted the improved level of civility and functionality on the board, with Castor expressing pride in working with Shapiro and Richards whom he considered "honest". The relationship amongst the three commissioners later prompted one columnist of The Philadelphia Inquirer to note that she owed Castor an apology for considering his complaints about the prior county administration "sour grapes". On November 3, 2015, Castor was defeated in his effort to return to the district attorney's post and Joe Gale was elected to succeed Castor as county commissioner. Upon retiring from county service after 30 years on January 4, 2016, Castor began practicing law full-time as a trial lawyer.

=== Private practice (2008–2016) ===
When his term as district attorney expired in January 2008, Castor took a position at the litigation firm of Elliott, Greenleaf & Siedzikowski in Blue Bell, Pennsylvania as a shareholder and director. One of his notable clients was professional basketball player Marko Jaric of the Memphis Grizzlies, who was accused of sexual assault in Philadelphia. Jaric was not charged in the case. In 2009, Castor represented Mark Sargent, who was investigated (but not charged) for patronizing a brothel while he served as dean of the Villanova University School of Law. In 2010, Castor represented his former boss, attorney Michael D. Marino, whose nephew accidentally shot and killed a man while hunting. Marino, a former Montgomery County D.A., was present when the shooting occurred, despite knowing that his nephew was prohibited from owning and using firearms, owing to a felony conviction. Marino was not charged in the case. On July 1, 2013, Castor joined the law firm of Rogers & Associates (subsequently renamed Rogers Castor) as a civil-litigation lawyer in Ardmore, Pennsylvania, with former Lower Merion Commissioner and former Republican state senate nominee, Lance Rogers.

=== Pennsylvania Solicitor General and Acting Attorney General (2016) ===
On March 21, 2016, Castor took the oath of office as the first Solicitor General of Pennsylvania. Being summoned to her Scranton office by Pennsylvania Attorney General Kathleen G. Kane on March 4, 2016, without explanation, Castor met General Kane expecting her to request him to represent her in a private capacity. Instead, Kane offered him the newly created position of Solicitor General of Pennsylvania (later merged into the job of first deputy attorney general), and Castor accepted. The move was necessitated because the Attorney General had her license to practice law suspended by the Pennsylvania Supreme Court. Castor was supposedly subordinate to Kane in all matters except for making legal decisions on behalf of Pennsylvania, though most observers considered him the de facto attorney general, a fact later confirmed upon Kane's resignation. In practice, Castor operated as a bridge between Kane and the remainder of the office of attorney general, in addition to being the final word on legal matters, in order to make the executive portion of the office function properly.

However, following Democrat Kathleen Kane's sudden resignation, Republican Castor was sworn in as Acting Attorney General of Pennsylvania, no longer simply de facto attorney general, though later that week Democratic Governor Tom Wolf nominated Democratic Inspector General Bruce Beemer to serve the remainder of Kane's term. The Pennsylvania Senate confirmed the nomination quickly. After Castor assumed the office of Acting Attorney General, he was the subject of criticism, and on August 30, 2016, Bruce Beemer succeeded Castor as attorney general. Castor resigned from the office of attorney general on September 9, 2016, reverting to first deputy attorney general and, finally, solicitor general.

=== Private practice (2017–2020) ===
Following his departure from the Attorney General's office, Castor returned to private practice at Rogers Castor. In 2017, Castor led the investigation into the Death of Tim Piazza at Pennsylvania State University. Castor and Rogers Castor, renamed as Rogers Counsel, parted ways on December 31, 2020.

=== Second impeachment trial of Donald Trump ===
On January 31, 2021, Castor was appointed to take the lead for Donald Trump's defense team for his 2021 impeachment trial, alongside criminal law practitioner David Schoen. Castor's opening arguments on February 9, 2021, were widely reported to be confusing and rambling, and famously included the statement "Nebraska, you’re going to hear, is quite a judicial thinking place" that became an online meme. Trump was reportedly "furious" about Castor's "rambling, almost somnambulant defense". Texas Republican U.S. Senator John Cornyn commented, "The president's lawyer just rambled on and on" and "I've seen a lot of lawyers and a lot of arguments, and that was not one of the finest I've seen." Castor for his part suggested the former president did not criticize his performance. "Far from it," he said.

=== Private practice (2021–2026) ===
Castor joined the personal injury law firm of van der Veen, Hartshorn & Levin in January 2021, just weeks before representing Donald Trump in his second impeachment trial. In September 2023, Castor and Michael van der Veen represented the estate of Fanta Bility, an eight-year-old girl killed by police gunfire, in wrongful-death litigation against the Borough of Sharon Hill that resulted in an $11 million settlement. 40 years to the day after his admission to the bar on November 5, 1986, Castor retired from the practice of law on November 5, 2026.

== Personal life ==
Castor lives in Montgomery County, Pennsylvania, where he has lived his entire life. He married Elizabeth Pierce in 1989, and together they have two children. His son, Bruce L. Castor III, is also an attorney.

Political offices
Preceded by Tom Ellis	Member of the Montgomery County Board of Commissioners; 2008–2016; Served alongside: Jim Matthews, Joe Hoeffel, Josh Shapiro, Leslie Richards, Val Arkoosh	Succeeded by Joe Gale
Legal offices
Preceded by Michael D. Marino	District Attorney of Montgomery County; 2000–2008	Succeeded by Risa Vetri Ferman
Preceded by Kathleen Kane	Attorney General of Pennsylvania; Acting; 2016	Succeeded by Bruce Beemer
