= Risa Vetri Ferman =

American lawyer

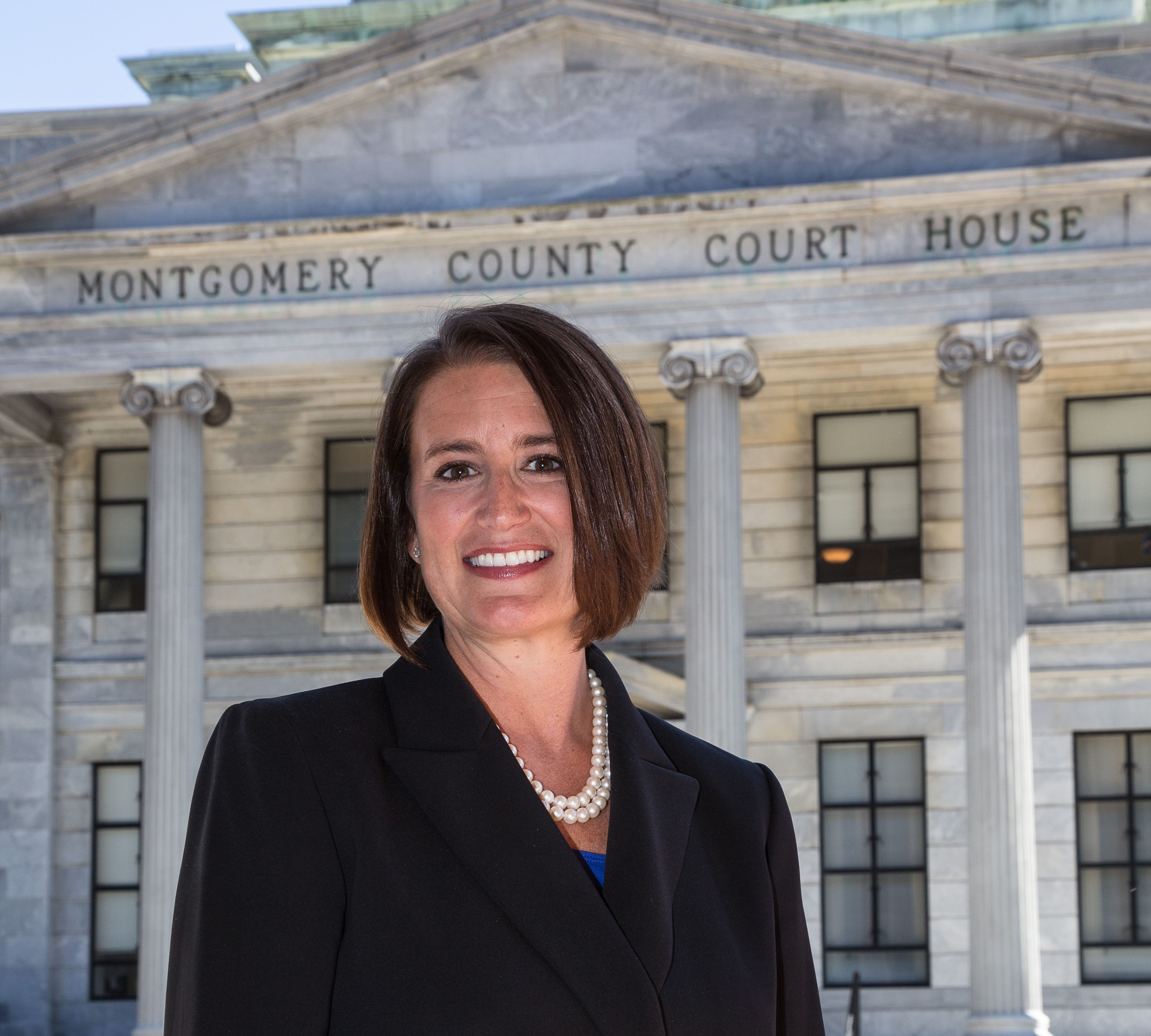

Judge of the Court of Common Pleas in Montgomery County
- Incumbent
- Assumed office January 5, 2016

District Attorney of Montgomery County
- In office January 7, 2008 – January 4, 2016
- Preceded by: Bruce Castor
- Succeeded by: Kevin R. Steele

Personal details
- Born: Risa Vetri; April 5, 1965 (age 61) Philadelphia, Pennsylvania, U.S.
- Party: Republican
- Spouse: Michael Ferman
- Children: 3
- Parent(s): Barbara and Sal Vetri
- Education: University of Pennsylvania (BA); Widener University (JD)
- Website: http://risaferman.com/ http://www.da.montcopa.org

Risa Vetri Ferman (born April 5, 1965) is the judge of the Court of Common Pleas in Montgomery County, Pennsylvania, and was formerly District Attorney of the same county. After working for 15 years in the Montgomery County District Attorney's Office, in November 2007, she became the first woman elected District Attorney in Montgomery County. In 2011, Ferman won re-election and began her second term as District Attorney in January 2012. She is the daughter of Barbara and Sal Vetri, and sister of restaurateur Marc Vetri and television director and producer Adam Vetri.

== Biography ==
=== Youth and education ===
Risa Vetri Ferman was born in Philadelphia and raised in Abington Township in Montgomery County, Pennsylvania. She is the daughter of Barbara and Sal Vetri. In her early life, Ferman worked for her father's jewelry store, which operated 35 storefronts and mall kiosks across Philadelphia, Delaware and New Jersey for 30 years.

She graduated from Abington Senior High School in 1983 and attended the University of Pennsylvania in Philadelphia, graduating in 1987. While enrolled in the evening program at Widener University School of Law in 1990, she interned for the United States Attorney's Office in 1991. Ferman graduated from Widener Law in 1992 with a Juris Doctor and was admitted to the bars of Pennsylvania and New Jersey in 1992. She was admitted to practice before the United States District Court for the Eastern District of Pennsylvania in 2006, and the United States Supreme Court in 2000. In 1993, Ferman began working as a prosecutor for the Montgomery County District Attorney's Office.

=== Early legal career ===
Ferman began work as a prosecutor in 1993 and rose to Captain of Sex Crime and Child Abuse. She has specialized in the prosecution of homicide, child abuse, sexual assault and domestic violence cases. In 2002, Ferman was selected to serve as First Assistant District Attorney, second in command to then-District Attorney Bruce Castor Jr. In this position, she supervised the county detective bureau and oversaw all homicide cases.

=== 2007 Montgomery County District Attorney election ===
In 2007, Ferman ran for the District Attorneys seat against Democrat Peter C. Amuso. Ferman won the election and received the highest vote count of any candidate on the ballot in 2007. She was elected in November 2007 as the first female District Attorney of Montgomery County and assumed office in January 2008.

== Service as District Attorney ==
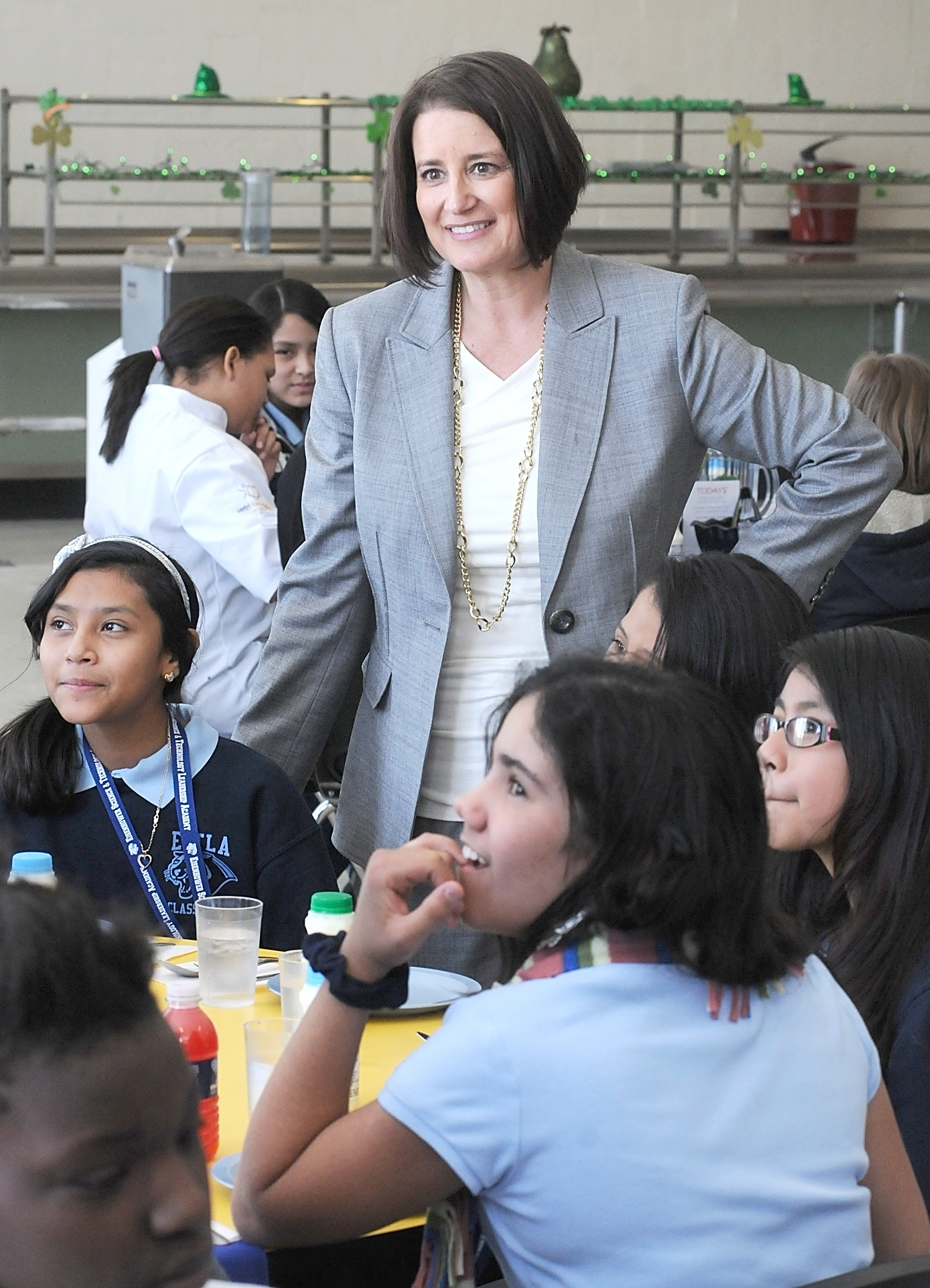
District Attorney Risa Vetri Ferman talks with students at a lunch table at Eisenhower Science and Technology Leadership Academy

In 2008, Ferman established an Elder Abuse Unit and Task Force to support seniors targeted by criminals. Ferman supervises the Elder Abuse Task Force, a collaboration between law enforcement agencies and the county's Aging and Adult Services. Ferman established the Elder Justice Roundtable in 2013 after further development with the Elder Abuse Unit and Task Force.

In 2009, Ferman co-founded the Mission Kids Child Advocacy Center in Norristown, Pennsylvania. Mission Kids is a 501(c)(3) corporation, founded through a collaborative effort with the Police Chiefs of Association of Montgomery County, and the Montgomery County Office of Children and Youth.

Ferman is a co-founder of the Montgomery County Child Advocacy Program (MCAP) as a board member. MCAP is a 501(c)(3) non-profit organization that provides free legal representation to children who are victims of abuse in Montgomery County. Ferman introduced the School Safety Committee as a primary source for County schools regarding safety. The committee consists of a variety of individual units such as school superintendents, public safety officials and law enforcement personnel. Ferman is an avid supporter of the Montgomery County Youth Aid Panel Program (YAP), a restorative justice initiative for juveniles in the criminal justice system. Ferman created the Teen Driving Safety Program, which includes a Teen Driving Safety Documentary, through a partnership with the WPVI Channel 6 ABC and a corresponding Teen Driving Safety Curriculum.

In 2012, Ferman convened Montgomery County's first Cyber Bullying and Bullying Task Force. Come 2013, Ferman, along with Montgomery County Commission Chair Josh Shapiro, former Montgomery County Sheriff Eileen Behr, Montgomery County Schools and Intermediate Unit, and the Police Chiefs Association of Montgomery County, announced the creation and release of the first Cyber Bullying/Bullying Task Force Manual in the country.

Ferman and Montgomery County Chief Public Defender Keir Bradford-Grey coordinated their efforts to protect youths in Montgomery County through a partnership with Big Brothers Big Sisters in Southeastern, Pennsylvania to create the "Back on Track program. In 2014, Ferman and Montgomery County Sheriff Russell Bono brought the Teen Suicide Prevention Program to Montgomery County in collaboration with John Halligan, founder of Ryan’s Story.

Ferman established the Detectives Violent Crime Unit to assist in investigations regarding brutal crime. She encourages the use of the District Attorney’s Office DUI and Accelerated Rehabilitative Disposition program for the first time, for non-violent offenders to highlight rehabilitative services. In addition, Ferman supports diversionary programs within Montgomery County such as the Veteran’s Treatment Court, Drug Treatment Court and Behavioral Health Court.

In April 2013, Ferman established the Montgomery County Prescription Drug Disposal Program which places safe receptacles for the public to safely dispose of their old or unwanted prescription drugs. Ferman spread awareness about Teen Prescription Drug Abuse through her involvement with the McIntyre Family and the death of their son Ronald "Ronnie" Powell III as a result of a prescription drug overdose. The District Attorney's Office has maintained a 98% conviction rate.

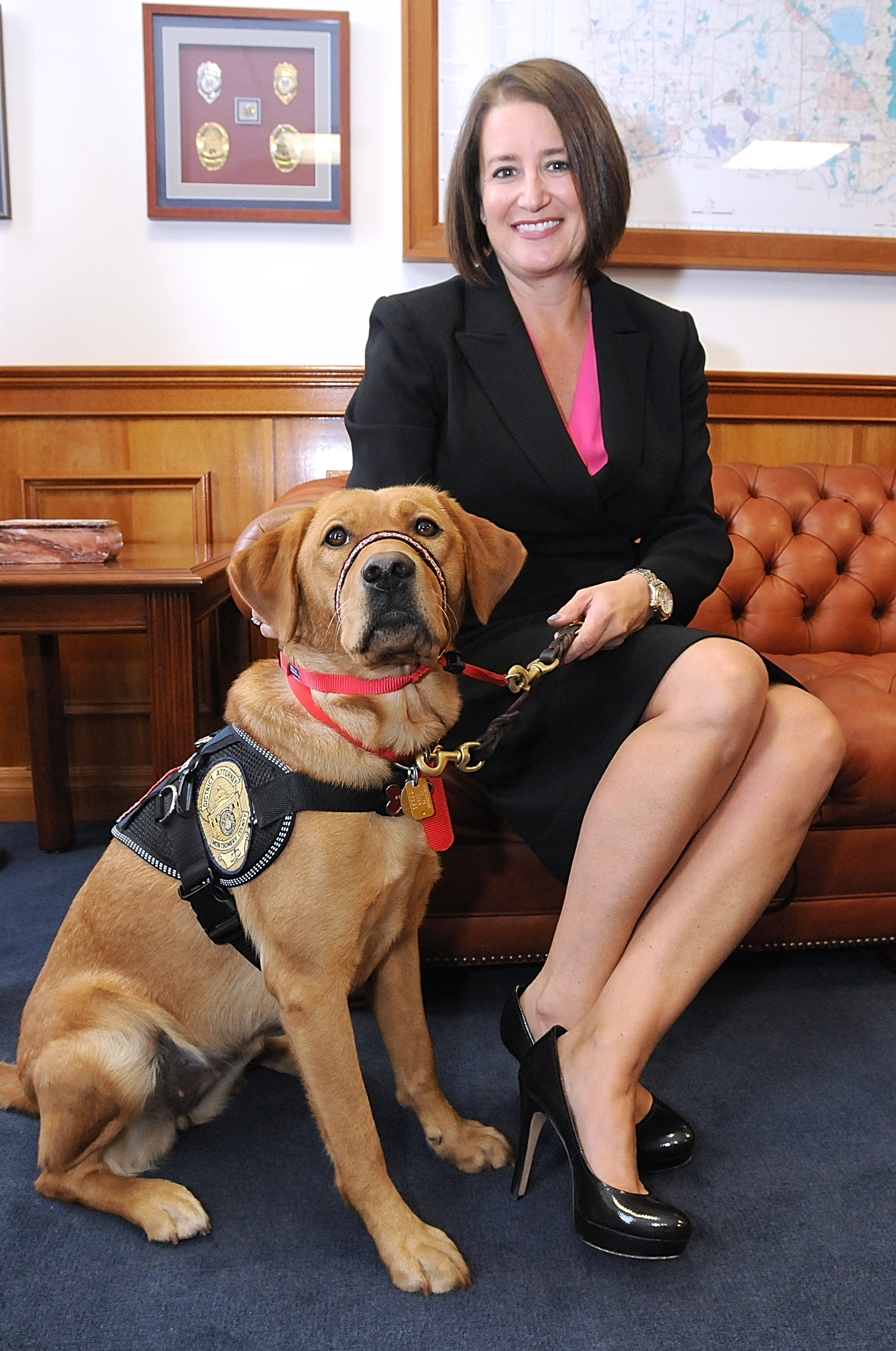
District Attorney Risa Vetri Ferman and Courthouse Comfort Dog K9 Turks

In October 2014, Ferman brought the Courthouse Comfort Dog Program to the Montgomery County Courthouse with the addition of "K9 Turks" to serve victims and witnesses through distressing situations in the courthouse.

In July 2015, Ferman was elected as the first female President of the Pennsylvania District Attorney's Association (PDAA). She is chair of the PDAA Best Practice Committee and a member of the Board of Directors for the Association of Prosecuting Attorneys (APA). She is a member of the Joint State Government Commissions Advisory Committee on Wrongful Convictions.

Ferman was nominated to Chair of the Criminal Procedural Rules Committee of the Pennsylvania Supreme Court in 2010, and began as a member in 2006. She is a member of the Pennsylvania District Attorney's Institute and helped to bring the Wheels of Justice bicycling team, a non-profit charitable organization that supports Law Enforcement related charities to Southeast Pennsylvania. In addition, Ferman brought the Fallen Hero Plaque Program to Montgomery County through collaboration with local law enforcement and founder of the program, James Binns Esquire.

== Politics ==
In 2011 Ferman was re-elected for a second term as Montgomery County District Attorney. As a result of her prolific fundraising (raising around $237,000) rumors arose that she was running for Pennsylvania Attorney General, however, she remained at her District Attorney post. Philadelphia Magazine profiled Ferman in 2011 as a result of her success as District Attorney with regard to her position on politics and types of crime rising throughout Montgomery County.

As of January 2015, Ferman decided to leave her position as District Attorney and run for a seat on the Pennsylvania Court of Common Pleas as Judge in Montgomery County.

In August 2015, Ferman charged Pennsylvania Attorney General Kathleen Kane for her alleged involvement in the leaking of confidential investigative information to a newspaper and for her subsequent attempts to cover up these actions. Following the leak, a grand jury investigated and recommended the arrest and filing of criminal charges against Kane for felony perjury and multiple misdemeanors nine months prior to her being charged. However, Ferman launched her own independent criminal investigation into the allegations against Kane. Ultimately DA Ferman concluded that it was appropriate to file criminal charges against the Attorney General. Kane's criminal trial for felony charges of perjury and obstruction began on August 8, 2016. On August 15, she was convicted on all nine counts.

== Author and speaker ==
=== Guest speaker ===
Ferman appeared on Dateline NBC in April, 2009. In November 2011, Ferman was featured as an honored guest speaker at the Widener Symposium on Child Abuse, "Lessons from Tragedy: Legal, Professional, and Ethical Issues Raised by Bradley and Beyond". In 2012, Ferman was featured at the Penn State Abington campus of Penn State University as the Spring Commencement Speaker.

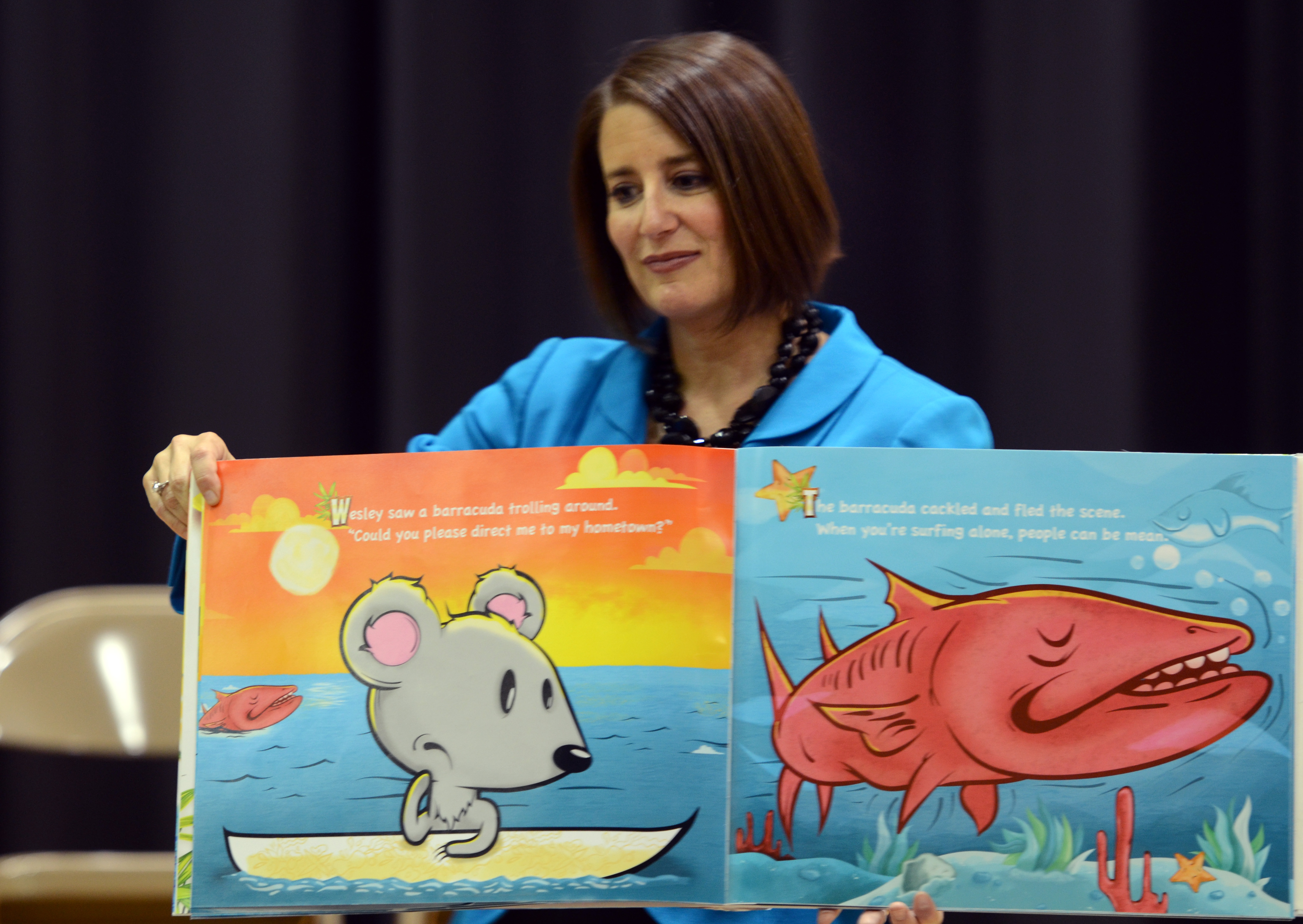
Montgomery County District Attorney Risa Ferman turns pages on a copy of her book "The Mouse Who Went Surfing Alone" as it is read to an assembly of students at Walton Farm Elementary School.

=== Author ===
Ferman is a featured author for the Widener Law Review of Widener University of Law, her review is titled, "Lessons from Tragedy: Bridging the Gap between Public Expectations and Legal Standards through an Evaluation of Criminal Investigations and Subsequent Charging Decisions". Ferman is also a blogger for The Huffington Post

Ferman authored and published the children's book "The Mouse Who Went Surfing Alone". All profits from sales of the book go to Mission Kids. The book is intended for young children and teachers as a teaching tool about internet safety. Thanks to a donation from the Verizon Foundation to Mission Kids, each child usually receives a copy to take home and discuss with his/her parents.

== Personal life ==
Ferman is married to husband, Michael, and has three children. Her mother, Barbara Vetri, was a lawyer specializing in real estate and family law. In 1994, her father Sal Vetri sold his jewelry chain, Crown Jewel. Her brother, Marc Vetri, is a chef in Philadelphia. The youngest of the Vetri family is Adam Vetri, who is a director and producer.
