= Bruce Beemer =

American lawyer and politician

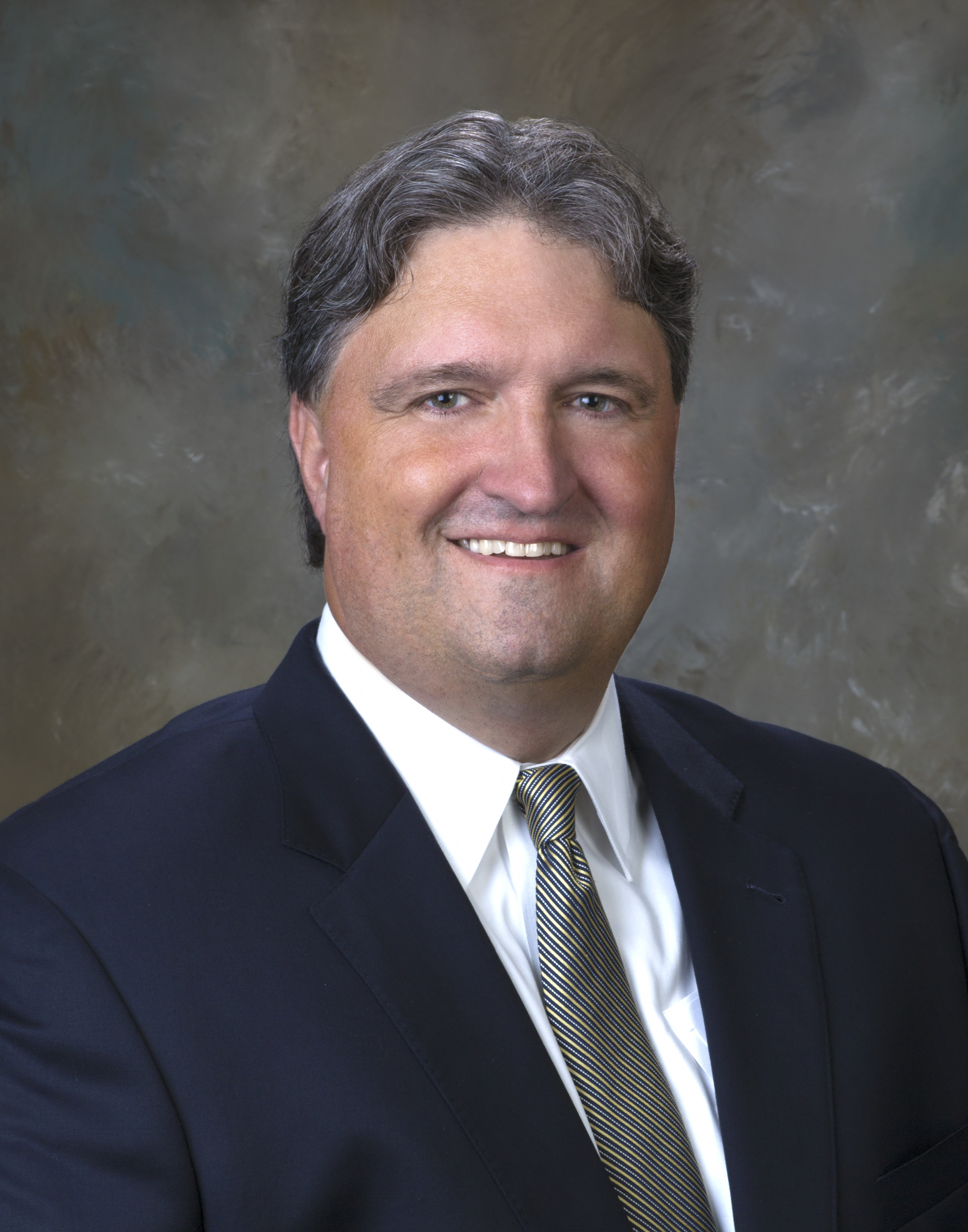

Judge of the Allegheny County Court of Common Pleas
- Incumbent
- Assumed office January 3, 2020

Attorney General of Pennsylvania
- In office August 30, 2016 – January 16, 2017
- Governor: Tom Wolf
- Preceded by: Kathleen Kane
- Succeeded by: Josh Shapiro

Inspector General of Pennsylvania
- In office July 25, 2016 – December 31, 2019
- Governor: Tom Wolf
- Succeeded by: Lucas M. Miller

Personal details
- Born: December 14, 1968 (age 57) Scranton, Pennsylvania, U.S.
- Party: Democratic
- Spouse: Jodi Beemer
- Children: Jackson Beemer and Jordan Beemer
- Education: University of Scranton (BA); University of Pittsburgh (JD)

Bruce Beemer (born December 14, 1968) is an American attorney and jurist currently serving as a judge on the Allegheny County Court of Common Pleas. He previously served as the attorney general of Pennsylvania from 2016 to 2017 and as Inspector General of Pennsylvania from 2016 to 2019. He was nominated to the Allegheny County Court of Common Pleas by Governor Tom Wolf and unanimously confirmed by the Pennsylvania State Senate in November 2019. He was sworn in on January 3, 2020.

== Early life and education ==
Beemer was born in Scranton, Pennsylvania. He attended Phillips Academy, graduating in 1987. In 1992, Beemer earned a Bachelor of Arts degree from the University of Scranton, before earning a Juris Doctor from the University of Pittsburgh School of Law in 1995.

Legal offices
Preceded by Bruce Castor; Acting	Attorney General of Pennsylvania; 2016–2017	Succeeded by Josh Shapiro
