= Leslie Richards =

City executive

Leslie S. Richards
- Richards in 2014

General Manager of SEPTA
- In office January 1, 2020 – November 29, 2024
- Preceded by: Jeffrey Knueppel
- Succeeded by: Scott Sauer

Secretary of Transportation of Pennsylvania
- In office May 11, 2015 – December 31, 2019
- Governor: Tom Wolf
- Preceded by: Barry Schoch
- Succeeded by: Yassmin Gramian

Member of the Montgomery County Board of Commissioners
- In office January 3, 2012 – January 2015; Served with Josh Shapiro, Bruce Castor
- Preceded by: Jim Matthews
- Succeeded by: Val Arkoosh

Personal details
- Born: April 3, 1967 (age 59)
- Party: Democratic
- Spouse: Ira Richards
- Education: Brown University; University of Pennsylvania

Leslie Richards (born April 13, 1967) is the former general manager of SEPTA, the public transportation agency serving the Philadelphia area. She previously served as a member of the Montgomery County Board of Commissioners and as Secretary of the Pennsylvania Department of Transportation, from 2015 to 2019 under Governor Tom Wolf.

== Personal life and education ==
Richards earned a bachelor's degree in economics and urban studies from Brown University, and a master's degree in regional planning from the University of Pennsylvania. She has three children with her husband, Ira: Rebecca, Benjamin, and Sophie.

== Career ==
Richards was elected to the Whitemarsh Township Board of Supervisors in 2007, and became chairwoman of the board in 2008.

Richards was elected to the Montgomery County Board of Commissioners in 2011. Her election, along with that of fellow Democrat Josh Shapiro, marked the first time in over a century that Democrats controlled the Montgomery County Board of Commissioners. Richards served as Montgomery County's representative on the Delaware Valley Regional Planning Commission. Richards also serves on the board of SEPTA.

Pennsylvania political operatives had mentioned Richards as a potential Congressional candidate in Pennsylvania's 6th congressional district. Richards declined to run for the seat after incumbent Congressman Jim Gerlach retired in 2014.

In 2015, following the election of Democratic Governor Tom Wolf, Richards was nominated to serve as Secretary of Transportation of Pennsylvania. She was subsequently confirmed by the Pennsylvania State Senate in May 2015.

In 2017, Richards was appointed the first female chair of the Pennsylvania Turnpike Commission as well as the Public Private Partnership (P3) Board.

On November 21, 2019, Richards was named as SEPTA's new general manager, replacing Jeff Knueppel in January 2020.

On October 25, 2024, Richards announced she would be stepping down from her position as SEPTA’s general manager & CEO on November 29, 2024. She then joined the faculty of the University of Pennsylvania's Weitzman School of Design as Professor of Practice. Richards was also to start a role at the Transportation Research Board of the National Academies of Sciences, Engineering, and Medicine in January 2025.

== Awards ==
Award	Organization	Year
Urbanist Changemaker of the Year	5th Square	2022
International Woman of the Year	Women's Transportation Seminar	2018
Celebrating Women Who Move the Nation	Conference of Minority Transportation Officials	2018
Above and Beyond Distinguished Service Award	City and State PA	2018
Service to Humanity	March of Dimes of Southeastern Pennsylvania	2018
Female Innovator of the Year	The Stevie Awards	2017
Female Executive of the Year	The Stevie Awards	2017
Women of Distinction	Philadelphia Business Journal	2017

Political offices
Preceded by Jim Matthews	Member of the Montgomery County Board of Commissioners; 2012–2015; Served alongside: Josh Shapiro, Bruce Castor	Succeeded by Valerie Arkoosh
