= Yassmin Gramian =

Pennsylvania Secretary of Transportation (2019-2023)

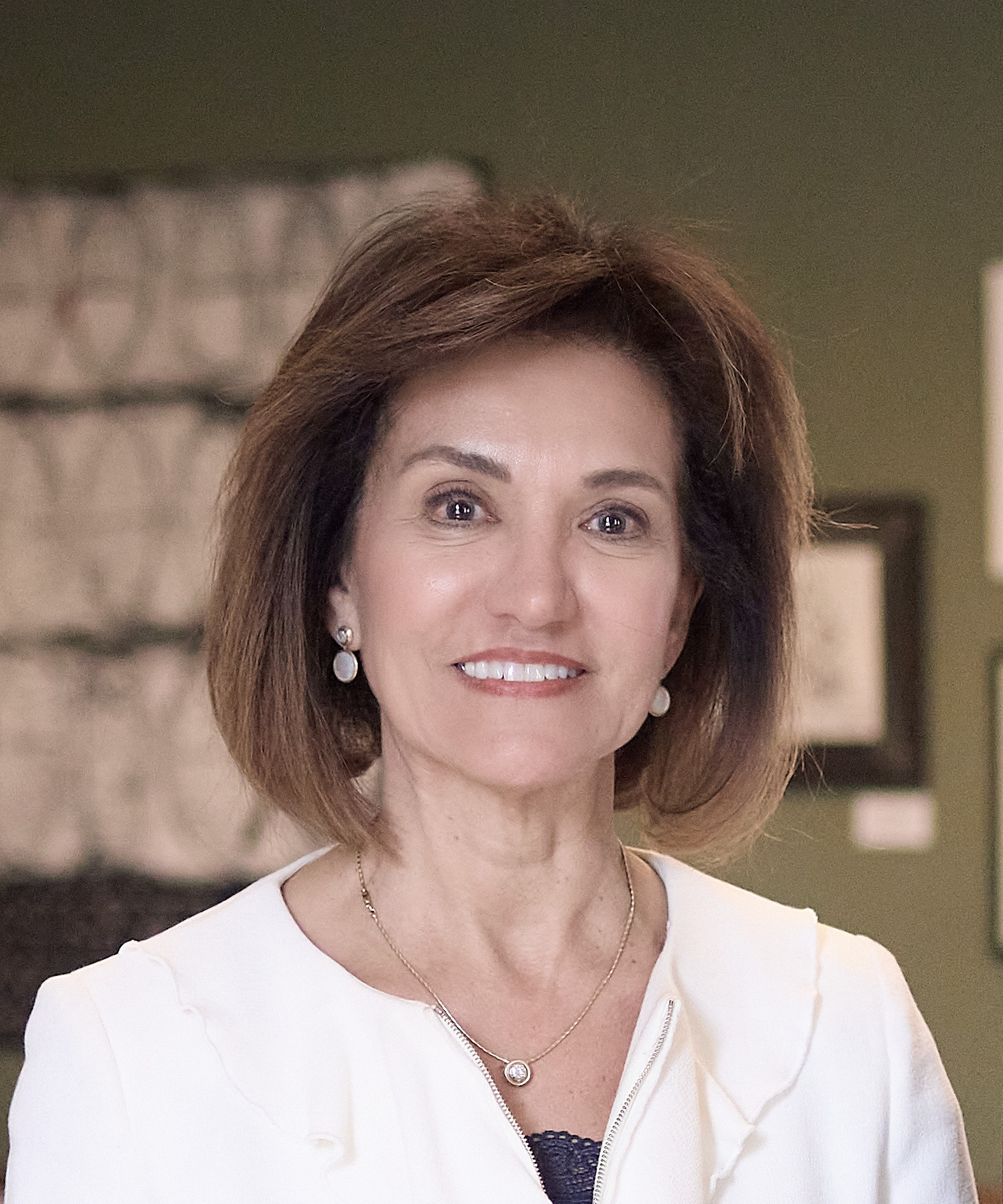

Secretary of Transportation of Pennsylvania
- In office 2019 – January 17, 2023
- Governor: Tom Wolf
- Preceded by: Leslie Richards
- Succeeded by: Michael B. Carroll

Personal details
- Party: Independent
- Spouse: Sassan S. Hejazi
- Children: Leila N. Hejazi, Cameron M. Hejazi
- Education: University of Michigan

Yassmin Gramian is an American politician and transportation industry engineering executive. She served as Pennsylvania Secretary of Transportation, having been nominated by Pennsylvania Governor Tom Wolf in 2019 and confirmed unanimously by the Pennsylvania State Senate on May 27, 2020.
