= Penn State fraternity hazing scandal =

Ongoing scandal in Pennsylvania, US

Pennsylvania v. Alpha Upsilon et al.
- Court: Centre County Courthouse
- Full case name: The Commonwealth of Pennsylvania v. Beta Theta Pi - Alpha Upsilon Chapter et al.
- Indictment: Investigative grand jury launched by special counsel, Bruce Castor. Largest criminal fraternity indictment in United States history issued by District Attorney Stacy Parks Miller. Operation Drugs Unlimited indictment issued by the 54th Statewide Investigating Grand Jury and Attorney General Dave Sunday (politician). Federal investigation launched by United States Attorney for the Middle District of Pennsylvania, Brian D. Miller (attorney), representative of the United States Department of Justice.
- Decided: 2017 to present
- Verdict: Multiple defendants have pled guilty; two defendants have successfully filed a stay. Not guilty of 18 Pa. C.S. 2504 , a felony against Timothy J. Piazza, a human being. Involuntary manslaughter charges refiled by Centre County, Pennsylvania District Attorney Stacy Parks Miller and Attorney General of Pennsylvania Josh Shapiro.

Case history
- Subsequent actions: Civil lawsuit filed by the Piazza family; 25 of 47 defendants settling civilly.; Passage of the Timothy J. Piazza Antihazing Law signed by Governor of Pennsylvania Tom Wolf.; Stop Campus Hazing Act signed into law by President of the United States Joseph Biden.

Court membership
- Judges sitting: Carmine Prestia (Preliminary Hearing); Allen Sinclair (Preliminary Hearing); Brian Marshall (Trial)

The Penn State fraternity hazing scandal is an ongoing issue within the Greek life system at Pennsylvania State University. The scandal encompasses hazing, binge drinking, drug trafficking and secretive ritualistic behavior. The scandal includes the separate deaths of college students Joseph Dado, Marquise Braham, and Timothy Piazza.

Piazza died as the result of hazing at the Beta Theta Pi fraternity at Pennsylvania State University at University Park, Pennsylvania. The incident led to the closure of the fraternity's chapter at the university, and at least 26 members of the fraternity had charges of involuntary manslaughter dropped by a presiding judge.

The scandal includes one of the largest criminal indictments against a fraternity and its members in American history. More than 1,000 counts were levied against 18 members of Beta Theta Pi, including eight who were charged with involuntary manslaughter and aggravated assault. Additional charges were added later. Piazza's death became a turning point for America's fraternities in regard to attitudes towards hazing.

In March 2025, the State College Interfraternity Council (SCIFC) was established by three Penn State fraternities no longer affiliated with or officially recognized by the school – so called "ghost organizations" – who were unhappy with the implementation of hazing prevention laws and policies stemming from the systemic issues encompassing the scandal. Organizations within the SCIFC have raised mass concerns with both Penn State leaders and parents. The creation of the SCIFC coincided with an executive order signed by President Trump which called for the United States Department of Education to be dismantled and the subsequent deregulation of schools across America following the passage of the Stop Campus Hazing Act, which had been signed into law by President Biden. On August 17, 2026, members of ghost organization Sigma Chi were indicted by Pennsylvania Attorney General Dave Sunday amidst the Operation Drugs Unlimited investigation. On August 26, 2026, SCIFC member, Acacia Fraternity, was also discovered to be implicated in the drug trafficking ring. In November 2026, SCIFC member Delta Upsilon – an organization implicated in the federal Operation Drugs Unlimited indictment – was banned from conducting operations on Penn State's campus for a minimum of four years.

== Background ==
In October 1949, Penn State’s Interfraternity Council (IFC) passed legislation abolishing Hell Week, which then consisted of pledges performing embarrassing tasks in downtown State College. The IFC’s attempts to regulate hazing complaints continued into 1956, when the governing board passed legislation to change Hell Week to "Help Week" and undertook the responsibility of investigating 100% of hazing complaints before initiation day. The 1956 legislation also required fraternities to allot a minimum of eight hours per day of sleep for pledges.

In 1985, Penn State's Policies and Rules for Students stated that students could "not engage in any activity on or off campus that might interfere with academics and cause mental or physical discomfort or injury." The university's hazing policies came under great scrutiny following the death of an Alfred University student in 1978, prompting members of the statewide Alliance of Pennsylvania Student Governments to pen letters to Pennsylvania state representative Edwin G. Johnson.

In October 1991, secret societies Parmi Nous and Skull and Bones Senior Honor Society came under police investigation by Officer David Scicchitano. Multiple students witnessed hazing conducted by Skull and Bones, and the witnesses claimed the State College Police Department was afraid to prosecute Skull and Bones due to the organization’s powerful, international connections. Police controversially closed the case on October 16, 1991. The crime involved students breaking into Engineering Unit C and destroying architecture students’ projects amid a fight involving eggs and water balloons. An investigation was commenced by the Undergraduate Student Government Supreme Court, which was sabotaged by secret society members in several ways.

A controlled survey was conducted by Penn State Pulse in 1986, which found that 66.5% of respondents had either witnessed hazing or been subject to hazing, and 70.3% of active pledges were hazing victims.

In 2005, Penn State alumnus Don Abbey, a member of Joe Paterno's first-ever Penn State Nittany Lions football scholarship class and a Beta Theta Pi alumnus, donated $1.2 million to renovate the Beta Theta Pi house. In 2006, Abbey raised another $3.5 million in renovation funds.

The renovation was lauded by Paterno and his wife, Sue Paterno. Throughout the renovation process, fraternity brothers smashed holes in the walls with baseball bats, leading Abbey to predict future damage to the property. He was a staunch critic of hazing. Due to the toxic culture he found in Beta Theta Pi, he installed an extensive video surveillance system to ensure he would be notified if an emergency ever occurred on the property.

The Penn State chapter of Beta Theta Pi was known to have a deep history of hazing. Brothers once held a party on their front porch, yelling racial slurs at an African American Penn State student as he walked past the house. The house was once banned for having a front yard littered with used condoms, along with hot sauce covering the entire Great Hall.

In April 2012, Asya Trowell, a pledge of fraternity Omega Essence, a subsidiary organization of Omega Psi Phi, was brutally hazed, resulting in the expulsions of three Penn State students. Hazing events left Trowell wounded with black eyes, epistaxis, and bruising in the abdomen. Trowell was force-fed mayonnaise and had hot sauce poured into her eyes as part of the hazing. The extensive hazing endured caused Trowell to withdraw from Penn State, ceasing her studies at the university.

In May 2012, Centre County District Attorney Stacy Parks Miller opened an investigation into on-campus hazing that occurred inside Penn State’s dormitory quarters, Pennypacker Hall. The case, which is related to the Trowell hazing, involved Resident Life Coordinator Aaron Holloman corrupting his position of authority to haze victims in the dorm rooms he managed. Police arrived to Pennypacker in March 2012 following a 9-1-1 call, and they observed loud paddling noises, which led them to discovering hidden paddles in the residence hall. This served as vital evidence for Trowell’s accusation of undergoing brutal hazing.

In 2013, Phi Kappa Sigma (Skulls) came under criminal investigation following the death of 20-year-old student Conor MacMannis, Skulls pledge pronounced dead at 3:43 a.m. on November 16, 2013, following a fall out of the ninth floor of the Penn Towers apartment building on Beaver Avenue in State College. Immediately following MacMannis' death, his companions present in the apartment were transported to Mount Nittany Medical Center and treated for overdoses, hallucinations, and paranoia due to LSD ingestion. The investigations led by State College Lieutenant Kieth Robb and the Interfraternity Council concluded that the drugs contributing to MacMannis' inebriation were not distributed by Skulls members, and Centre County Drugs and Alcohol Services assistant administrator, Cathy Arbogast, theorized the drugs may have been experimental lab chemicals which should never have left the biological laboratory. The official toxicology report confirmed the presence of 25I-NBOMe, a fraudulently adulterated synthetic drug marketed as LSD, in MacMannis' system at the time of his death. The Interfraternity Council called for the Greek life community to "join together to support MacMannis' family" following the incident. In October 2023, Skulls was placed on a four year suspension due to a multi-years' long worth of "widespread and pervasive hazing behavior."

In September 2016, Kordel Davis, a Beta Theta Pi pledge, was driven to a clinic after a night of hazing that left a gash on his head.

== Death of Marquise Braham ==
Marquise Braham was an 18-year-old college student attending the Penn State campus in Altoona, Pennsylvania. In 2014, Braham died by suicide following severe psychological distress while pledging the fraternity Phi Sigma Kappa. The hazing was so brutal that Braham did not want to return to campus in order to avoid the hazing perpetrators. Braham's father, Richard Braham, went on to advocate for hazing prevention laws at the federal level, and met with legislators to lobby for the passage of the Stop Campus Hazing Act, which was successfully signed into law by President Biden in December 2024. Beginning January 1, 2021, Penn State became legally mandated to report hazing violations across "all campuses," properties, and locations owned by the university.

== Death of Joseph Dado ==
Joseph Dado was an 18-year-old Penn State student who died after being served drugs and alcohol by fraternities Phi Gamma Delta and Alpha Tau Omega in September 2009. Following a Pennsylvania State Police search and rescue emergency management operation conducted via police helicopter, Dado was found dead in a stairwell with a 0.169 blood alcohol content. Two Penn State students received criminal charges as a result of his death, and the Alpha Tau Omega fraternity stood trial. The IFC, the self-governing body over Penn State’s fraternities, subsequently created a course for students to become ‘Greek Event Monitors’ at parties.

Dado’s death led to Penn State President Graham Spanier presenting a 30-component strategy to the Board of Trustees on a plan to combat the university’s binge drinking epidemic. The strategy included implementations for students to receive mandatory alcohol training after receiving an underage drinking citation or being treated for alcohol poisoning. State Senator Jake Corman responded to Dado’s death with a statement of interest to raise alcohol-related fines to $1,000.

== March 2015 Kappa Delta Rho investigation ==
On March 16, 2015, news broke of a secret Facebook group run by members of Penn State’s chapter of the Kappa Delta Rho fraternity. The fraternity came under State College police investigation after it was discovered their pages titled ‘2.0’ and ‘Covert Business Transactions’ featured pictures of women who were naked and unconscious. As a result of the police investigation, Penn State implemented the Fraternity and Sorority Life Task Force, which would not prevent a hazing death in February 2017. Investigators pursued invasion of privacy and harassment charges. The fraternity was known to pose severe issues to the campus community as early as 1992.

In June 2015, James Vivenzio filed a lawsuit against Penn State and Kappa Delta Rho. Vivienzo’s suit alleges vigorous hazing at the hands of Kappa Delta Rho leadership, including being force fed concoctions of liquor, urine, vomit, cat food and hot sauce. This concoction was known as ‘Beta Brew’ within the Beta Theta Pi fraternity, possibly inspired by Kappa Delta Rho’s ability to evade severe prosecution and reprimand following their investigation.

Leadership within Kappa Delta Rho was prepared for students to become unconscious due to excessive alcohol consumption, reserving a special bedroom for unconscious partiers as part of their illegal risk management efforts. When women were placed in these bedrooms unconscious, Kappa Delta Rho fraternity members would take pictures of the women, and distribute the pictures throughout group chats. The fraternity was suspended by the Penn State Administration for three years until 2018.

On May 26, 2015, the Penn State Administration sent a letter to the university's IFC, indicating pledges were forced to "run errands, clean the fraternity house... participate in boxing matches... and plank with bottle caps on their elbows." In addition, Kappa Delta Rho pledges were forced to create stories containing pornographic images along with a “sex position of the day.”

The Vivenzio suit notates Kappa Delta Rho’s illicit drug operation: Fraternity members would steal prescription drugs from pledges and sell them to Penn State students to raise money for alcohol. The secret Facebook pages were utilized as a marketplace to distribute cocaine, marijuana, and other illegal drugs.

== Death of Tim Piazza ==
Several students accepted bids to join Penn State’s Beta Theta Pi in spring 2017, including Tim Piazza, a 19-year-old sophomore engineering student. On the night of February 2, 2017, while undergoing hazing activities for the fraternity, Piazza, on an essentially empty stomach, drank large amounts of alcohol in a short period of time as part of an obstacle course called "The Gauntlet", which required each pledge to drink from a bottle of vodka, drink a beer, and finally drink from a bag of wine. Piazza was given at least 18 drinks in 82 minutes (roughly one every 4 and a half minutes). It was later revealed that Piazza took prescription antidepressants, which contributed to his inebriation.

The fraternity was supposed to be alcohol-free after a suspension in 2009. St. Moritz Security Services, a private security agency hired by the Interfraternity Council to make unscheduled checks on fraternity parties, failed to shut the party down, despite sending two investigators to the house that night. It was later reported that "the checkers were not full-time security guards, but Penn State kids who were working part-time for St. Moritz."

In this state of intoxication, Piazza fell down the basement stairs of the house, hit his head, and became unconscious. He was carried to a couch, where surveillance cameras captured a conspicuous bruise on his left abdomen; however, this was later shown to have originated from another one of the alcohol-fueled rush events for fraternities that Piazza had attended a week earlier.

Some time later, Piazza regained consciousness and rolled off the couch. Three brothers picked him up and placed him back on the couch. Security footage shows them poking Piazza in the face to determine if he was okay, but he remained unconscious and unresponsive. Kordel Davis, a newly initiated fraternity chapter member, attempted to render aid to Piazza, encouraging fraternity members to dial 9-1-1 and get an ambulance to the house. He was shoved up against a wall, and his attempts were ignored.

At around 3:30 am on February 3, 2017, Piazza tried to get up, but once he reached a standing position, he fell backward. He continued to stand up, only to repeatedly fall back down. Once he was finally able to maintain balance, he staggered toward the lobby area of the house, but fell again headfirst into an iron railing and landed on a stone floor, likely incurring serious head trauma. He got up and tried to reach the front door, but fell headfirst into it, knocking himself unconscious again. He later tried once more to ascend the basement stairs and was missing until several of the fraternity brothers discovered him several hours later behind the bar in the basement, cold and breathing rapidly.

It was at this point that Piazza was carried upstairs. After several minutes of debating on what the next step should be, the conclusion was made that Piazza's injuries were indeed serious and that he would require medical attention. Before emergency assistance arrived, the brothers wiped blood from his face and attempted to dress him to warm him. Around 6:00 AM, the Penn State football head athletic trainer walked over Piazza’s body to get to work. At 10:48 AM, emergency services arrived and Piazza was brought to Mount Nittany Medical Center, but was quickly transported to Penn State Milton S. Hershey Medical Center because of the severity of his injuries.

Upon arrival, Piazza was rushed into surgery, where he was discovered to have a ruptured spleen and was in class IV hemorrhagic shock. His brain had swollen to the point that roughly half of his skull had to be removed to relieve the pressure. The surgeons attempting to save his life deemed the injuries to be likely non-recoverable, and Piazza was pronounced dead in the early morning of February 4, 2017. He was estimated to have had a blood alcohol content of nearly 0.40 on the night of the hazing incident.

Brendan Young, then president of the Penn State chapter of Beta Theta Pi, claimed that, following the hazing incident, Piazza "looked fucking dead".

== Beta Theta Pi prosecutions ==
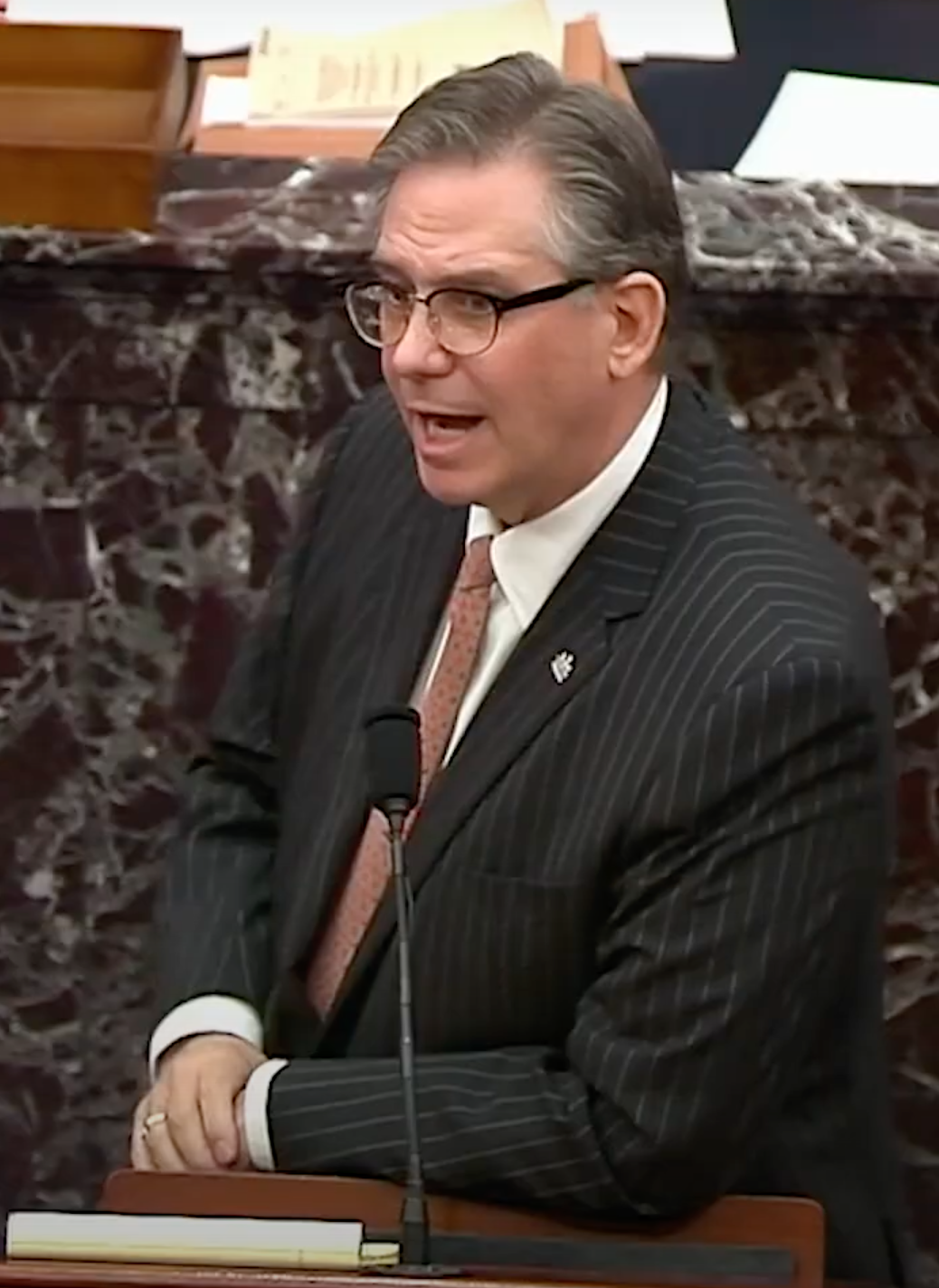
Bruce Castor investigated the initial case with District Attorney Stacy Parks Miller.

The scandal resulted in one of the largest hazing prosecutions in US history. On May 5, 2017, following a comprehensive grand jury investigation conducted by Centre County District Attorney Stacy Parks Miller, eighteen members of the fraternity were charged in connection with Piazza's death: eight were charged with involuntary manslaughter and the rest with other offenses, including hazing.

In addition to the fraternity brothers, the Beta Theta Pi fraternity itself was also charged. Its Penn State fraternity branch was closed after its president ordered it to be banned from campus indefinitely. In September 2017, the fraternity and its eighteen members faced a combined total of more than 850 criminal charges.

In October 2018, Michael Angelo Schiavone pleaded guilty to conspiracy to commit furnishing alcohol to minors. Investigators discovered texts in which Schiavone admitted to operating the fraternity's “Slush Fund.” Schiavone states the “Slush Fund” was utilized to purchase alcohol for the fraternity's parties.

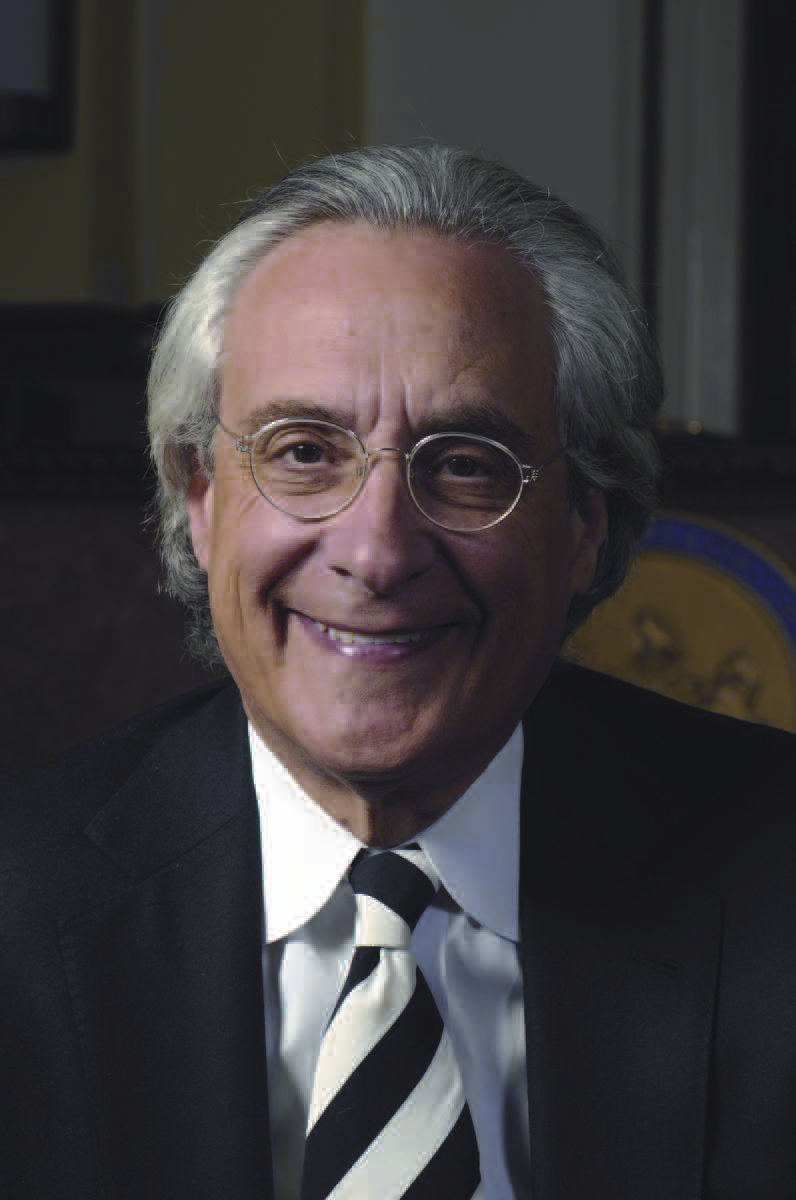
Notable Philadelphia attorney Thomas R. Kline helped the Piazza family throughout the trial and media circus that ensued.

=== Alleged perpetrators ===
Prosecutors filed the following charges in the alleged crime and its cover-up:

- Daniel Casey (age 19): 201 counts, including involuntary manslaughter; charges reduced to reckless endangerment, hazing, and furnishing alcohol to a minor
- Brendan Young (age 21): 200 counts, including involuntary manslaughter; charges reduced to reckless endangerment, hazing, and furnishing alcohol to a minor
- Jonah Neuman (age 19): 79 counts, including involuntary manslaughter; charges reduced to reckless endangerment, hazing, and furnishing alcohol to a minor
- Lars Kenyon (age 19): 52 counts, including reckless endangerment; charges reduced to furnishing alcohol to a minor
- Michelangelo Schiavone (age 21): 52 counts, including reckless endangerment; charges reduced to hazing and furnishing alcohol
- Nick Kubera (age 19): more than 50 counts, including involuntary manslaughter; charges reduced to hazing and furnishing alcohol
- Ryan Foster (age 21): one count of tampering with evidence
- Edward Gilmartin (age 20): one count of tampering with evidence

Tampering with evidence and endangerment charges have also been dismissed against three other students, Joseph Ems (ghost brother and leader of dangerous hazing events in the fall of 2016), Ryan McCann, and Lucas Rockwell.

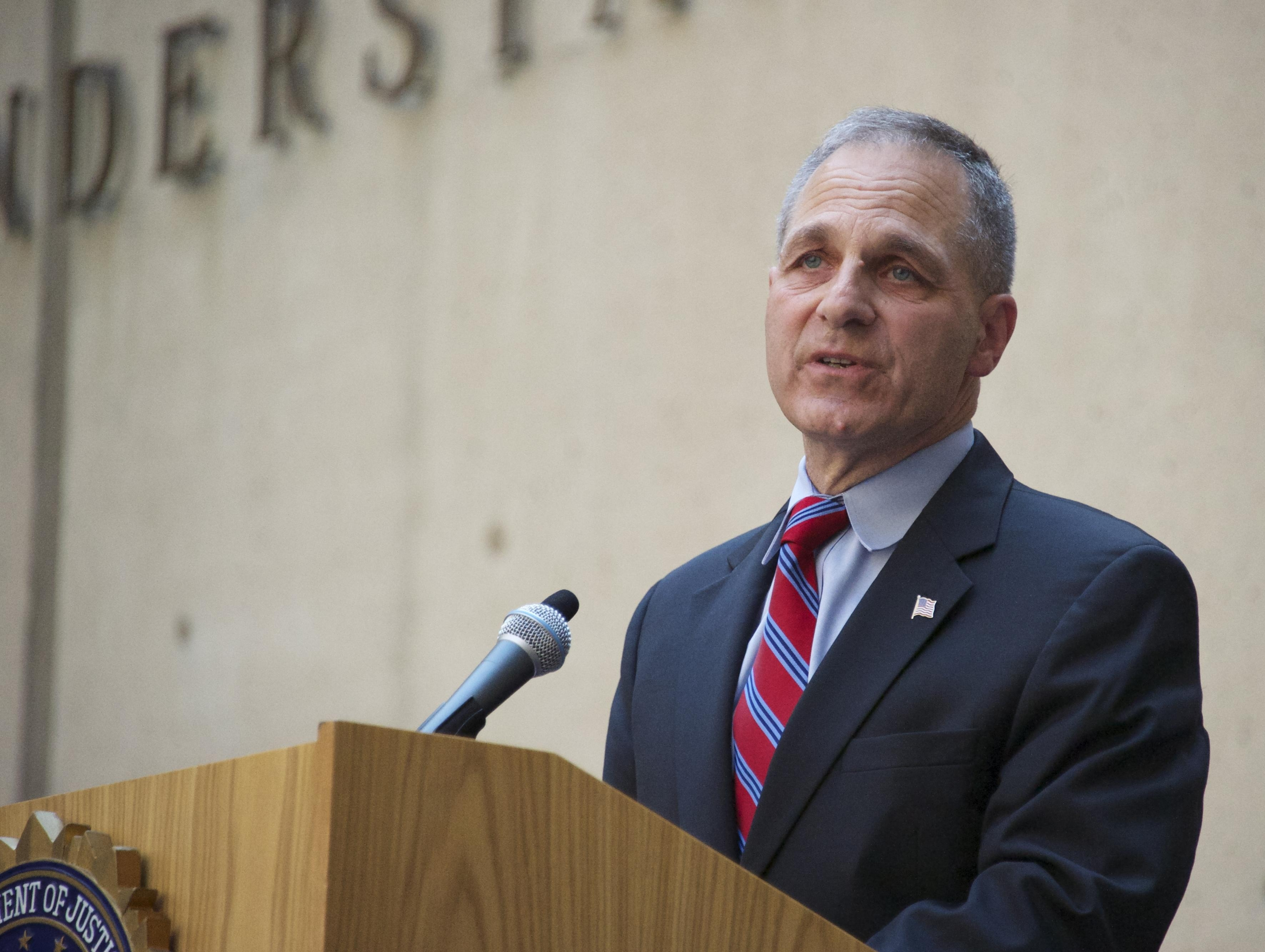
Penn State formerly contracted Louis Freeh, former Director of the Federal Bureau of Investigation (FBI), in an attempt to alleviate responsibility in the Sandusky scandal. In the Piazza case, the FBI investigated Penn State students.

On November 14, 2017, ten more members were charged in connection with Piazza's death. The new charges were filed after the Centre County District Attorney announced that the Federal Bureau of Investigation had recovered video showing that Piazza had been given at least 18 drinks in 82 minutes that had been intentionally deleted from the original video. The additional defendants are:

- Joshua Kurczewski (age 19): eight counts, including involuntary manslaughter, hazing, and furnishing alcohol to a minor
- Ryan Burke (age 21): eight counts, including involuntary manslaughter, hazing, and furnishing alcohol to a minor; pleaded guilty on June 13, 2018
- Jonathan Kanzler (age 19): eight counts, including involuntary manslaughter, hazing, and furnishing alcohol to a minor
- Aiden O'Brien: eight counts, including involuntary manslaughter, hazing, and furnishing alcohol to a minor
- Brian Gelb: three counts, including hazing, furnishing alcohol to a minor, and unlawful acts relative to liquor
- Patrick Jackson: three counts, including hazing, furnishing alcohol to a minor, and unlawful acts relative to liquor
- Reggie Goeke: three counts, including hazing, furnishing alcohol to a minor, and unlawful acts relative to liquor
- Mike Fernandez: three counts, including hazing, furnishing alcohol to a minor, and unlawful acts relative to liquor
- Donald Prior: three counts, including hazing, furnishing alcohol to a minor, and unlawful acts relative to liquor

Ems (age 19) gained additional charges: hazing, furnishing alcohol to a minor, and unlawful acts relative to liquor stemming from forcing a pledge to drink massive amounts of alcohol in September 2016, sending him to a clinic with blood gushing out of his forehead. Braxton Becker (age 20), who had the charge of tampering with evidence dropped against him, was charged with it again (and later acquitted) after new footage suggested he deleted the footage that led to these new charges. Becker was also charged with (and acquitted of) obstructing administration of law and charged with (and convicted of) hindering apprehension. Additional investigations led to the discovery of a drug trafficking ring headquartered in Beta Theta Pi, and Becker faced additional charges of "seven felony counts of possession with intent to deliver, three felony counts of criminal use of a communication facility, four misdemeanor counts of possession with intent to deliver, and one misdemeanor count of possession of drug paraphernalia." Becker's involvement in the scandal led to a two year probation sentencing and a $5,000 fine. On November 1, 2017, Lars Kenyon claimed "the judge got it right" and Kenyon had to "[figure] some stuff out". In November 2017, at least 26 members face charges.

=== Commonwealth of Pennsylvania v. Beta Theta Pi - Alpha Upsilon et al. ===
On August 11, 2017, on the fifth day of the preliminary hearing, it was announced by lead investigators that basement footage from the bid acceptance on February 2, 2017, had been deleted by a defendant already charged in the case. Lead prosecutor Centre County District Attorney Stacy Parks Miller noted that additional charges would be filed as a result of this finding.

On the same day, defense attorneys for a number of the defendants started to blame Tim Bream, the Penn State Nittany Lions football head athletic trainer and Beta Theta Pi live-in advisor. He was present during the night of Tim Piazza's bid acceptance, although he has never been charged in the case. After unsuccessful attempts by attorneys to have Bream subpoenaed, the judge in the case ordered that Bream have his hearing on possible contempt of court and avoiding his subpoena.

On February 8, 2019, Parks Miller received a law license suspension of one year and one day for communicating improperly with judges and defense attorneys. Parks Miller was defended by Bruce Castor throughout the trial. Parks Miller was reinstated to practice law in September 2021.

== Phi Beta Sigma prosecutions ==
In May 2025, Ferguson Township Chief of Police Shawn J. Morrison announced criminal hazing and assault charges against two members of Phi Beta Sigma who are accused of brutally hazing pledges. The ghost organization’s Dean, Jacob D. Francis, and the ghost organization’s President, Jayson Archer, hazed pledges by forced paddling and punching pledges in their chest. Leaders of the ghost organization stalked pledges, implementing a surveillance program in which pledges had to enable location tracking on their cellphones and share their location at all times with Francis and Archer.

Students filed reports to Penn State administrators in March 2025 indicating the perpetrators wanted to make pledges bleed. The extensive hazing included forced military-influenced workouts, lineups, and unusually hot showers. One pledge informed police that perpetrators paddled him twenty times in a row. The violence became so brutal that pledges would wear layers of clothing to hinder the pain of the paddles. Preliminary hearings for the defendants are set for June 4, 2025, and August 4, 2025. Phi Beta Sigma was suspended indefinitely by Penn State in August 2025.

== Operation Drugs Unlimited ==
On Monday, August 17, 2026, Pennsylvania Attorney General Dave Sunday announced criminal charges against members of Sigma Chi and Delta Upsilon for operating the largest drug trafficking ring at Penn State. Known as Operation Drugs Unlimited, the investigation found that members of the fraternities forced pledges to pack cocaine in fraternity property. Attorney General Sunday indicates the drug trafficking ring was highly profitable, very sophisticated, and congruent with operations run by organized crime syndicates and racketeers. These types of crimes are very often times also connected to money laundering.

Criminal charges were filed against fourteen total individuals, including ringleaders of the operation. The 54th Statewide Investigating Grand Jury, led by Attorney General Dave Sunday, led to the discovery of a cocaine ring headquartered at the fraternities in State College, Pennsylvania. One of the individuals charged in the operation is Pittsburgh attorney Paul Robinson, father of Penn State student, Thomas Robinson. Paul Robinson, of Meyer, Darragh, Buckler, Bebenek, and Eck, P.L.L.C., attempted to hide evidence in a safe, and is charged with felony tampering and hindering apprehension. As Paul Robinson hid cash in a safe, his activities are congruent with schemes utilized by international money laundering operations.

The drug trafficking ring was spearheaded by Penn State student and Sigma Chi fraternity member, Agostino Abbatiello of Westbury, New York. Attorney General Sunday indicates Abbatiello hazed pledges utilizing the crime ring's drugs at parties hosted by Sigma Chi and Delta Upsilon. Abbatiello and his co-conspirators, Thomas Robinson, Mohammed Hurabi, and Lars Zeepvat, have been charged with felony corrupt organizations, dealing in proceeds of unlawful activity, and criminal conspiracy; co-conspirator Robert Zanolla is charged with felony conspiracy and criminal use of a communication facility.

The ring leaders hazed pledges by forcing them to "cut and package cocaine" as an initiation ritual, as discovered by Attorney General Dave Sunday. The ritual netted the fraternities hundreds of thousands of dollars in revenue, as Abbatiello and Robinson made excessive trips to New York and Philadelphia to acquire large amounts of supply, solidifying a complex drug corridor in the process. Retired Federal Bureau of Investigation Supervisory Special Agent James A. Gagliano states the crime ring "enlisted pledges" to "[step] on the cocaine," a slang term utilized in the criminal underworld, referring to the dilution and adulteration of drugs. Adulterated drugs previously led to the separate deaths of Skulls pledge Conor MacMannis in 2013 and sophomore William Denton in 2018. The Penn State Administration warned the student body of adulterated drugs, specifically "rainbow fentanyl," in 2022, following a public service announcement from the Drug Enforcement Administration. The rainbow fentanyl was pushed to Penn State and other universities across America by the Sinaloa Cartel and the Jalisco New Generation Cartel headquartered in Mexico. Centre County Drug and Alcohol Program Administrator Cathy Arbogast, who provided community support following the death of MacMannis, indicates the Operation Drugs Unlimited indictment is congruent with a wider large scale uptick in the prevalence of stimulants, including cocaine and synthetics, utilized by residents in Centre County, Pennsylvania. The United Nations echos Arbogast's findings regarding an upswing in synthetic drugs.

The crime syndicate operated as a cartel, with Robinson being recruited into the operation by a fellow student, who was later bought out and made a free man by Robinson. Mohammed Huraibi of Delta Upsilon testified in the Centre County Courthouse that he withdrew himself from the crime syndicate following the enlistment of pledges into the operation. Fraternities operating as crime syndicates is an ongoing prevalent trend in Nigeria, wherein the United States Department of Justice and the United States Secret Service investigates confraternities and the crimes they inflict on American citizens. Crimes of money laundering and drug trafficking often escalate on an international scale in multiple regions congruently, according to the United Nations Office on Drugs and Crime. The Penn State Administration condemns the hazing activities discovered throughout the Operation Drugs Unlimited investigation.

== Shep Test ==
Throughout the Beta Theta Pi investigation, lead investigators discovered the fraternity required its pledges to pass the ‘Shep Test’ to become initiated into the fraternity. North American Interfraternity Conference (NIC) CEO Jud Horras denied the existence of the ‘Shep Test’ in America’s modern-day fraternities. However, Pulitzer Prize nominee Caitlin Flanagan interviewed Penn State hazing victims and discovered the ‘Shep Test’ consists of the following:

- Pledges wait outside in the pouring rain akin to water baptism and ritual purification, awaiting orders from the pledge master.
- The pledge master then brings the pledges into the fraternity house one-by-one to administer the fake branding, akin to baptism by fire. During this ritual, active members of the organization shout the name of the organization's false idol.
- Following the fake branding ceremony, pledges are stripped to their undergarments and forced to squeeze beside each other in the boiler room, akin to cruel and unusual punishment.
- A psychological operation is then administered on the pledges, in which active brothers ask pledges to drink "blood" (actually hot sauce) and walk over glass blindfolded (actually broken chips) akin to indoctrination and brainwashing.
- Pledges are asked to consume a mushed concoction of foods named Beta Brew, akin to sacramental wine.

The final step of the ‘Shep Test’ involves pledges being paddled on their gluteus maximus. The test was also once known as the ‘National Test,’ and was to be eliminated within Beta Theta Pi’s ‘Men of Principle’ strategy. The term 'Shep Test' is a metaphor for flock management, in which pledges are akin to sheep, and the pledge masters are akin to shepherds and spiritual guides.

== Penn State Athletics connection ==
Tim Bream, the Penn State football Head Athletic Trainer and University Assistant Athletic Director, was the live-in advisor for Beta Theta Pi. State College Detective David Scicchitano testified that Bream lied under oath twice throughout the investigations. When Detectives interviewed Beta Theta Pi fraternity brothers, it was discovered that Bream had to approve all parties within the fraternity house and was aware of the fraternity’s alcohol presence. In December 2016, Bream arranged for a bartender to serve alcohol to minors within the fraternity house.

Detective Scicchitano testified that after Tim Piazza fell down the stairs, Tim Bream stood ten feet away from Piazza and looked at his body, around 5:30 AM. These interactions were caught on video camera.

Due to lying regarding his knowledge of events leading up to Tim Piazza’s death, Tim Bream came under investigation by Deputy District Attorney Sean McGraw and the Attorney General of Pennsylvania. Although government officials struggled to gather evidence against Bream, a private investigator lobbied to have Bream charged with perjury, recklessly endangering another individual, and furnishing alcohol to minors.

During a May 10, 2017, interview with Savannah Guthrie of Today Show, Penn State President Eric J. Barron alluded to Bream’s role within the Beta Theta Pi house, pointing out the ‘faculty advisors’ within the fraternity. Despite a ‘model fraternity’ image and Bream’s appointment as an advisor, President Barron states Beta operated as a ‘secret society’ on Penn State’s campus. President Barron retired soon after.

== Media coverage ==
=== Initial coverage ===
The scandal attracted a significant amount of national media attention, and was regularly the main topic of many TV talk shows, including Good Morning America, The Today Show, CBS This Morning, and on CNN.

Penn State was discussed in the 2024 A&E documentary special Houses of Horror: Secrets of College Greek Life. Kappa Delta Rho hazing victim James Vivenzio appeared in the 2022 PBS documentary Hazing.

=== Beta Theta Pi ===
Thomas R. Kline, the lawyer for the Piazza family, was featured on talk shows extensively. On May 16, 2017, Mehmet Oz appeared on The Today Show to discuss warning signs of dangerous binge drinking. On June 12, 2017, Nancy Grace discussed the case on her podcast.

The case was the headline of several magazine articles. On November 15, 2017, Caitlin Flanagan published the article "Death at a Penn State Fraternity" in The Atlantic. The Atlantic article pointed out the ties between Beta Theta Pi and Joe Paterno. Vanity Fair published the article "How a Fatal Frat Hazing Became Penn State's Latest Campus Crisis" on October 3, 2017. Time magazine published the article "'Those Families Are Changed Forever.' A Deadly Year in Fraternity Hazing Comes to a Close"

The New York Times extensively covered the case including articles "18 Penn State Students Charged in Fraternity Death", "Prosecutors Taking Tougher Stance in Fraternity Hazing Deaths", and "Penn State Student's Dying Hours Play Out in Courtroom Video". On February 2, 2018, Vice News published the documentary "Penn State is Still Keeping Secrets on Frat Row".

=== Hulu miniseries ===
On October 10, 2022, it was reported that Robert Greenblatt is developing a Hulu miniseries entitled Death at Penn State, based on Caitlin Flanagan's 2017 article in The Atlantic about the events surrounding the Piazza case.

=== Operation Drugs Unlimited ===
On September 28, 2026, The Wall Street Journal published the article "Penn State's Campuswide Cocaine Ring Was Fueled by Fraternity Hazing." On November 18, 2026, NBC News published the article "DOJ Charges Former Penn State Student at Center of Fraternity Drug Bust."

== Guilty plea ==
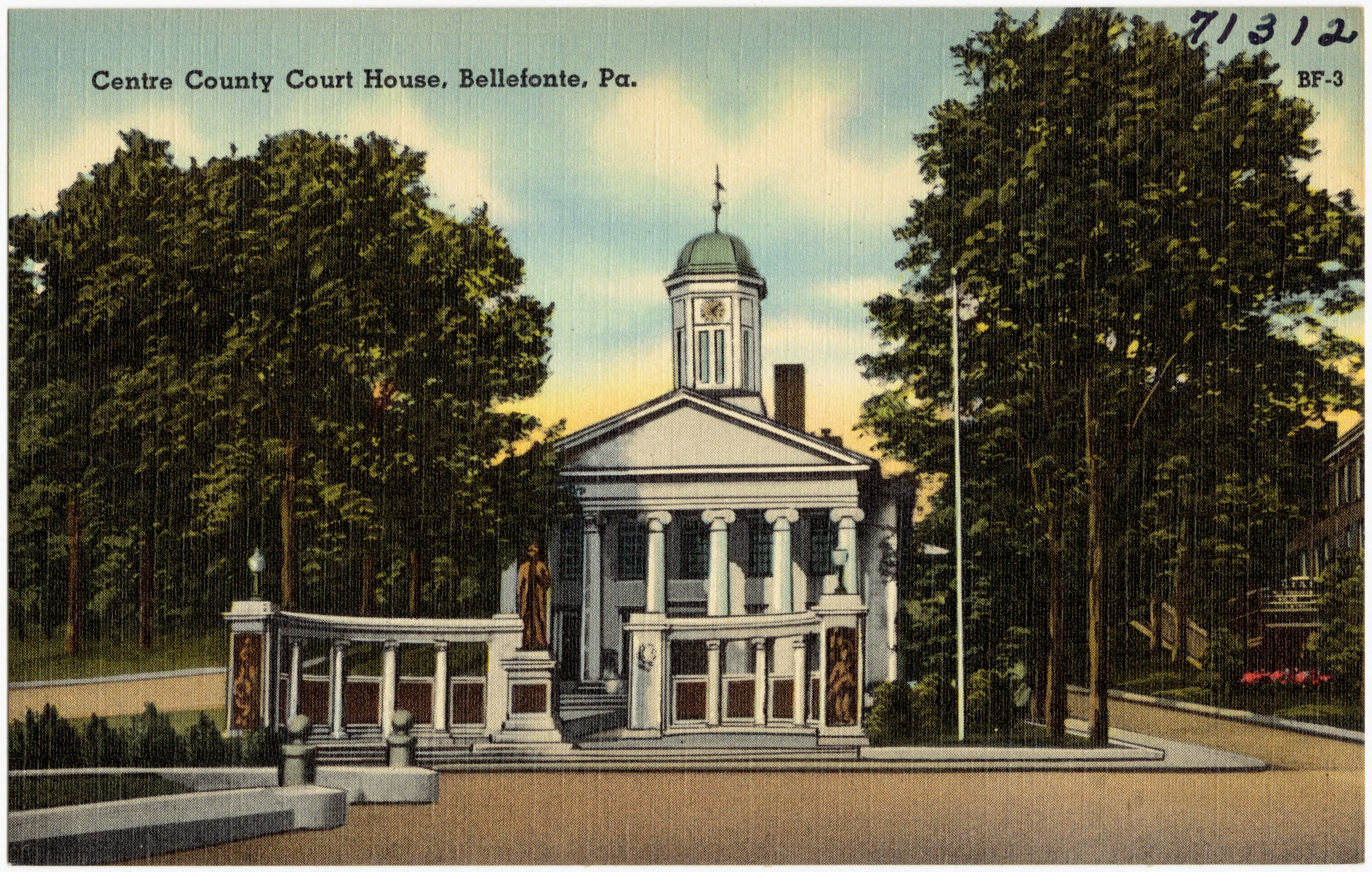
The trials played out at the Centre County Courthouse in Bellefonte, Pennsylvania and the Centre County Courthouse Annex.

One of the Beta Theta Pi fraternity brothers charged in the death of Tim Piazza pleaded guilty on June 13, 2018, to nine charges, making him the first in the case to enter a guilty plea; Ryan Burke, age 21, pleaded guilty to four counts of hazing and five counts relating to unlawful acts involving liquor in the deadly injuries Piazza sustained following a night of heavy drinking and hazing. Burke was accused of giving Piazza a bottle of vodka at the Beta Theta Pi party. Burke admitted his role in the hazing of Piazza, which included being present for and actively encouraging a gauntlet of drinking games and an obstacle course involving Piazza and other pledges.

On July 31, 2018, Burke was sentenced to three months of house arrest for his role in the hazing death of Piazza. He pleaded guilty to nine misdemeanor charges, including four counts of hazing and five counts involving unlawful acts related to alcoholic beverages. In addition to the house arrest, Burke was sentenced to 27 months of probation and was ordered to pay fines, costs, and restitution.

== Timothy J. Piazza Anti-Hazing Law ==
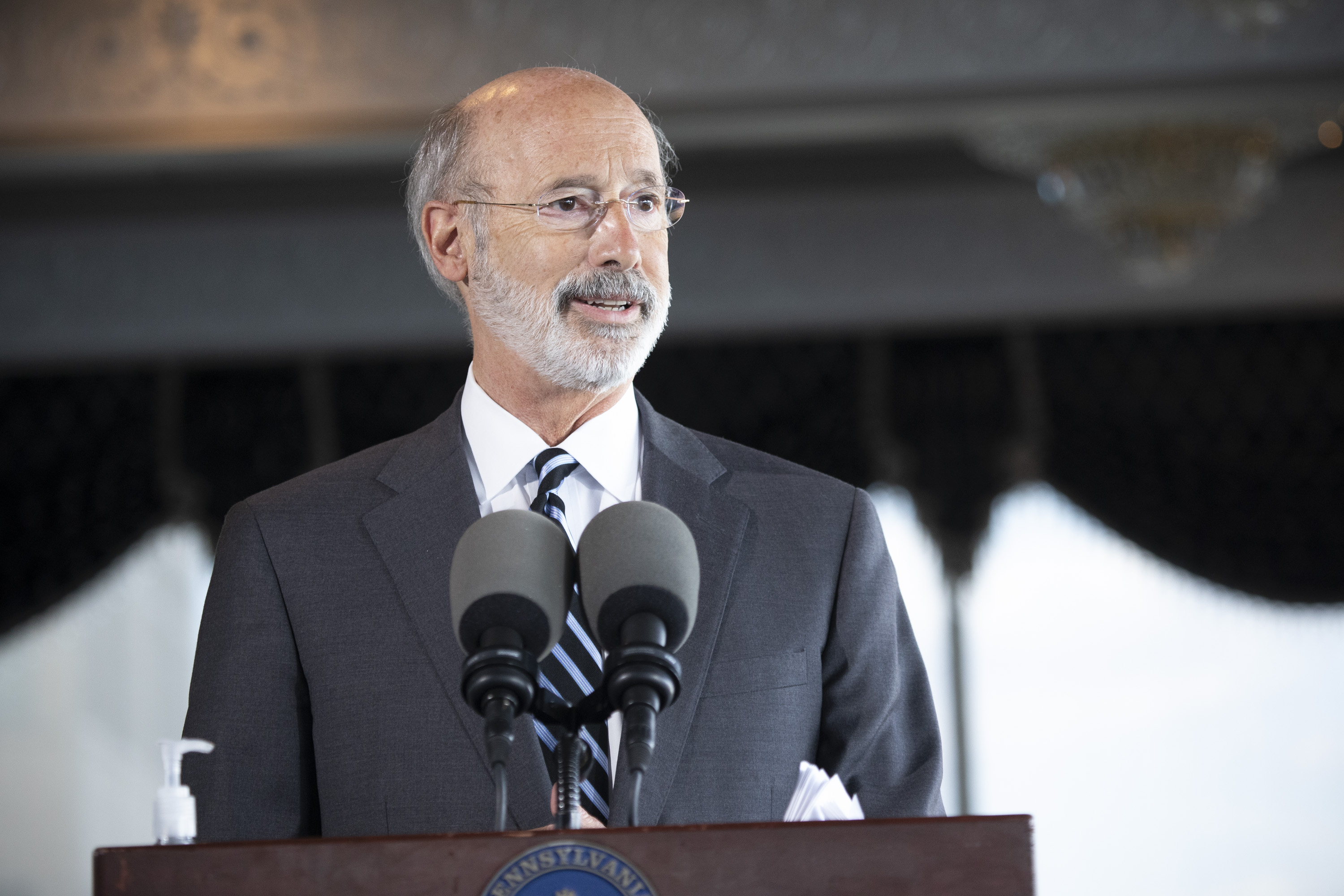
On October 19, 2018, Pennsylvania Governor Tom Wolf signed the Timothy J. Piazza Antihazing Law into immediate effect.

The grand jury that recommended charges against the brothers also directed Centre County District Attorney Stacy Parks Miller to investigate Penn State University and its role and response to hazing. During many months of testimony from multiple witnesses, including former pledges and others with firsthand experience, the Grand Jury collected evidence about the University's response and handling of hazing across the board. The Grand Jury received testimony regarding the prior Penn State fraternity hazing-related death of Joe Dado and a suicide linked to hazing pressures at the Altoona branch of Penn State. Witnesses aware of the ongoing hazing and extreme drinking over the years say they notified Penn State authorities, but little was done, despite extensive records documenting the hazing, abuse, and other dangerous behavior. Pledges that testified confirmed that hazing had become routine behind the closed doors of the fraternity houses, with Penn State turning a blind eye and adopting a hands-off approach.

The testimony revealed that pledges were routinely forced to drink extreme and potentially deadly levels, and brothers would inflict physical and mental abuse on pledges, including violence and sleep deprivation. More extreme behaviors, including sexual, physical, and emotional abuse, and the killing of small animals, were documented. The pledges were threatened that if they told anyone about the activities, there would be consequences. As a result of this evidence, the Grand Jury released a scathing 236-page report regarding hazing and excessive alcohol consumption at Penn State fraternities.

The report recommended sweeping changes to Pennsylvania's hazing law and Penn State's inadequate manner of handling hazing. The report called for the legislature to establish "Tim's Law", creating more severe punishments for hazing. It directed Penn State to strengthen its hazing policies. The report recommended a zero-tolerance policy against those who violated hazing laws and the implementation and enforcement of severe restrictions for underage drinking. The report recommended strengthening laws against furnishing alcohol to minors and that Penn State create a "pledge's bill of rights" that outlines acceptable and unacceptable behavior during the pledge process. Finally, the report recommended that Penn State establish a confidential hazing hotline.

The anti-hazing legislation was subsequently submitted for consideration in the full state Senate.

Lawmakers named the anti-hazing legislation after Tim Piazza.

== Timothy J. Piazza's Law ==
On August 24, 2021, New Jersey Governor Phil Murphy signed into law S84/2093, requiring public and non-public middle schools and high schools, as well as higher education institutions, to adopt anti-hazing policies and penalties for violations of the policies. S84/2093 is nicknamed the “Timothy J. Piazza Law” after Timothy Piazza.

Advocates of the law include:

- New Jersey Department of Education Acting Commissioner Angelica Allen-McMillan
- New Jersey Secretary of Higher Education Brian Bridges
- Acting New Jersey Attorney General Andrew Bruck
- New Jersey Senator Kip Bateman
- New Jersey Senator Troy Singleton
- New Jersey Senator Linda R. Greenstein
- New Jersey Senate Minority Leader Tom Kean, Jr.

With Timothy J. Piazza's Law in effect, hazing in New Jersey is upgraded from a fourth-degree crime to a third-degree crime when it results in death or serious bodily injury; and hazing in New Jersey is upgraded from a disorderly persons offense to a fourth-degree crime if it results in bodily injury.

== Educational response ==
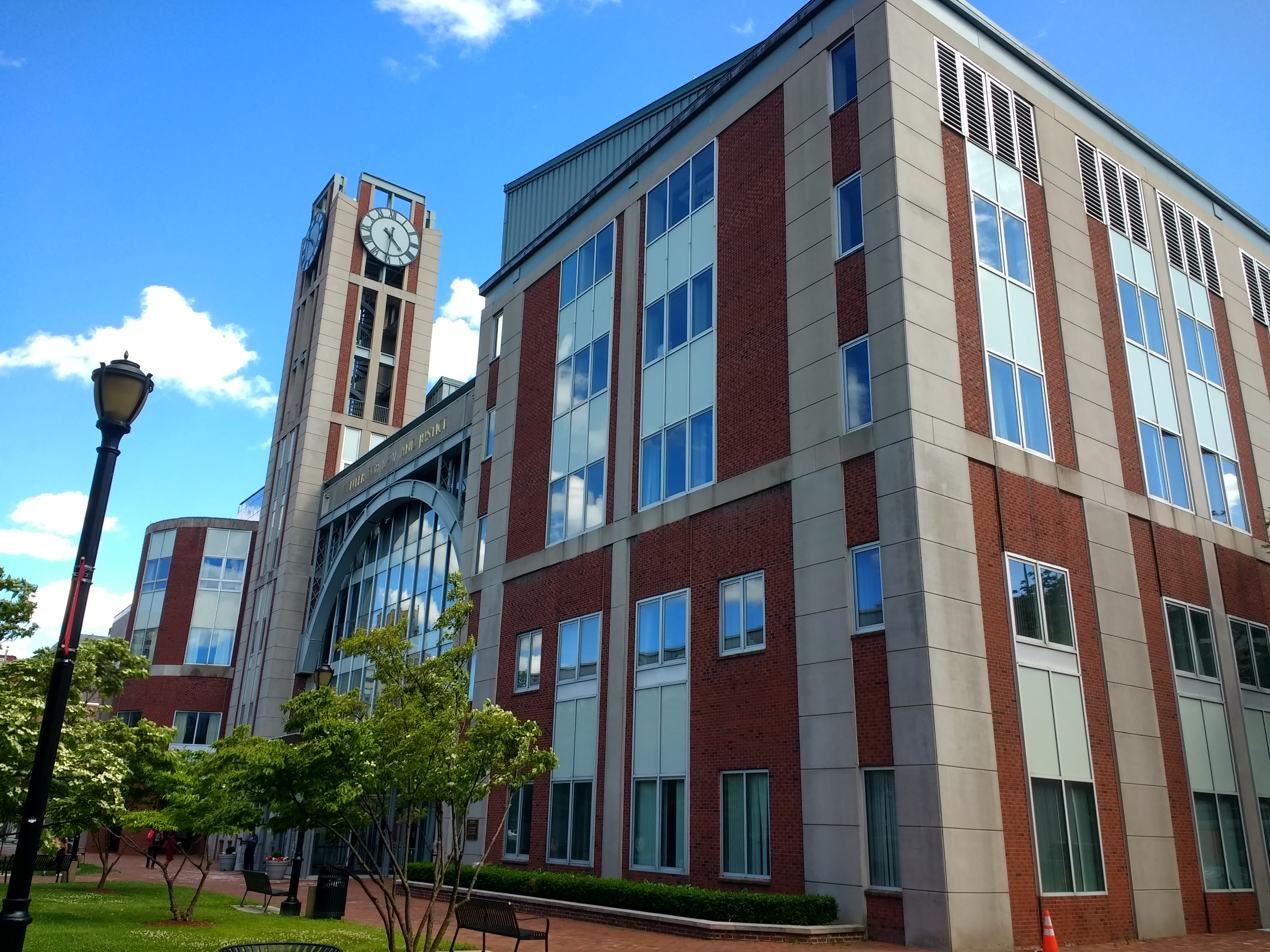
Rutgers Law School led a legal analysis into the Pennsylvania laws created and amended as a result of Piazza's death.

Legal scholars continually point to the Piazza case as grounds for change in hazing prevention legislation. The Journal of College and University Law, published in conjunction with Rutgers Law School, analyzed the Pennsylvania laws created out of the Piazza case and determined that not enough legal changes have yet been made.

Many sociologists and psychologists pointed towards the prevalence of groupthink in the Piazza case. This scenario has been analyzed in several books, including Discover Sociology: Core Concepts and Harvard University Press's Why We Act: Turning Bystanders Into Moral Rebels.

The Chronicle of Higher Education pointed out that four pledges died in 2017 alone, but the added media coverage the Piazza case has attracted can help lead to monumental change for the first time.

In 2020, the Villanova University School of Law analyzed a Penn State football hazing lawsuit in which a victim sued head coach James Franklin. The scholars of the Moorad Sports Law Journal, point to the Timothy J. Piazza law as precedent and indicate that 95% of college students do not report hazing. The scholars believe that the student who sued Coach Franklin should be taken seriously, given the new Pennsylvania anti-hazing laws created out of the Piazza case. On April 21, 2026, the Villanova University Charles Widger School of Law Digital Repository added the case file, "Isaiah Humphries v. Pennsylvania State University," to their permanent Digital Repository.

== Suspended chapters ==
Due to the severity and international recognition of the scandal, Penn State now publicizes a continuously updated list of Greek letter organizations whose university recognition has been revoked. Suspended chapters may not operate on campus as an active student organization and are banned from participating in university-sponsored events.

Wyatt DuBois, director of university public relations, emailed Penn State parents in October 2024, notifying the parents of Penn State’s sudden rise in hazing complaints filed by students. Although suspended, Sigma Chi was among the named perpetrators listed in DuBois’ email. In January 2025, the Parents Program for Penn State Student Affairs held a meeting in which leaders urged Penn State community members to avoid the fraternity Phi Kappa Sigma, known popularly as Skulls. Phi Kappa Sigma operates on Penn State’s campus sub rosa, although it was suspended for hazing through 2027. Although not recognized by the university, Phi Kappa Sigma alumni continue to assist with member operations.

In March 2025, the State College Interfraternity Council (SCIFC) was founded after the university banned chapters of Sigma Chi, Pi Kappa Alpha, and Tau Kappa Epsilon. All three founding organizations of the SCIFC have separated from Penn State and the IFC with plans to run their organizations independently, separate from university oversight and leadership entirely. Jim Edwards, president of the Lion Fraternity Alumni Association, stated the SCIFC will recruit freshman students, which is forbidden by Penn State for safety reasons. Edwards also states the SCIFC will have an independent judicial system, separate from the officially recognized Office of Student Conduct. Sigma Chi, founding member of the SCIFC, was discovered to be engaged in organized crime amidst the Operation Drugs Unlimited investigation in August 2026. Sigma Chi's co-conspirator, Delta Upsilon, has been placed on interim suspension pending an investigation led by the Office of Student Accountability and Conflict Response.

=== Ghost organizations ===
The prevalence of ghost membership within Penn State's Greek life community was first discovered by Centre County District Attorney Stacy Parks Miller throughout the Beta Theta Pi investigation. Parks Miller indicted Joseph Ems – Beta Theta Pi ghost brother who described himself as a "young boy who made bad decisions" during his arraignment. Ems was sentenced to twelve months probation, and the Pennsylvania Attorney General requested for Ems to be admitted into an anger management treatment program. The Centre County Grand Jury discovered Ems was the ringleader of hazing in the Beta Theta Pi house throughout the Fall 2016 semester. Ems was a student at Penn State Altoona when he pledged Beta Theta Pi over forty miles away in State College, Pennsylvania. Ems' daily commute impressed the organization's members throughout the new membership process, and he was granted access to the upper echelons of the organization after being sworn in as Social Chair. While still attending the Altoona campus, Ems was initiated into the Beta Theta Pi fraternity as a ghost member in University Park. Ems was provided with a price controlled room in Beta Theta Pi's State College house until the alumni board discovered major discrepancies with the organization's profit and loss statement. Ems was utilized as the ringleader of hazing by the chapter's student executive board since it was believed his status as a ghost member shielded the organization from liability. Ghost students in colleges and universities across America are investigated by the United States Department of Justice as part of Operation Ghostbusters.

The Penn State Administration has stated that ghost organizations pose a massive threat to the health, safety, and well-being of college students. Ghost organization Sigma Chi has been indicted by the Pennsylvania Attorney General, yet continues to operate as an illegal organization. Phi Kappa Sigma also operates on Penn State's campus with ghost status.

== Stop Campus Hazing Act ==
The United States House Committee on Education and Workforce advanced the Stop Campus Hazing Act in September 2024 with a 28-2 bipartisan vote. On December 23, 2024, President Biden signed into law the Stop Campus Hazing Act, the first piece of federal Hazing Prevention legislation in United States history. Inspired by the hazing issues on Penn State's campus, the law mandates the Clery Center to oversee hazing violations across America. With hazing codified on the federal level, students associated with sports teams, clubs, fraternities, and sororities are federally obligated to refrain from engaging in organizational hazing activities.

== Aftermath ==
=== Beta Theta Pi ===
On September 1, 2017, Beta Theta Pi defendant Joseph G. Ems appeared on ABC News with his lawyer. He has since been sued by the Piazza family. Jim and Evelyn Piazza have gone on to speak to thousands of college students throughout the United States to end hazing on campuses. Kordel Davis, Beta Theta Pi pledge, led a hazing prevention tour in fall 2019 entitled "One Night a Pledge". Penn State settled with the Piazza family to avoid further civil litigation.

Tim Bream, the Penn State Nittany Lions football head athletic trainer, attempted to sue Penn State for wrongful termination, but the judge ruled against him, citing prescription drugs being stolen right out of his work desk. In March 2021, Bream sued Penn State a second time, claiming the university violated his contract and created "intolerable" working conditions as a result of his role in the Beta Theta Pi house. On March 30, 2021, settlements were reached with 25 defendants and third party defendants in civil suits. In December 2021, Centre County Judge Brian Marshall ruled that Penn State could take ownership of the Beta Theta Pi house.

Penn State President Eric J. Barron attempted to transform Penn State's Greek life system following Piazza's death; he announced his retirement in June 2022. In March 2023, Spotlight PA reported on an internal memo, which indicated Penn State planned to roll back certain oversights of campus Greek life, including changes that would "end the regular monitoring of chapter houses" and "allow first-semester recruitment." The university later denied that those changes had been officially implemented.

In July 2024, Beta Theta Pi defendants Brendan Young and Daniel Casey both pleaded guilty to 14 counts of hazing and one count of reckless endangerment. In October 2024, the two were sentenced to two to four months in prison, along with three years of probation and community service.

=== Operation Drugs Unlimited ===
Following the Operation Drugs Unlimited indictment, it was discovered that the ringleader of Penn State's cocaine trafficking ring, Agostino Abbatiello, is connected to cascading criminal investigations. Abbatiello's brother, Sebastiano M. Abbatiello, was arrested on July 10, 2026, after he was discovered to be in possession of cocaine while riding a pontoon at Bald Eagle State Park.

== See also ==
- Beta Theta Pi – Incidents
- List of hazing deaths in the United States
- Matt's Law
- Killing of Sanda Dia
