= 2024 Pennsylvania Senate election =

- November 5, 2024

25 of 50 seats in the Pennsylvania State Senate 26 seats needed for a majority

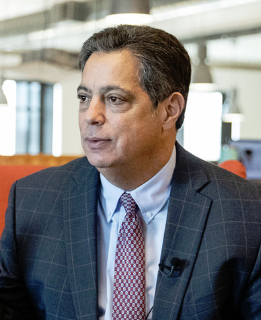
	Majority party	Minority party
Leader	Joe Pittman	Jay Costa
Party	Republican	Democratic
Leader since	November 30, 2022	January 4, 2011
Leader's seat	41st district	43rd district
Last election	28	22
Seats after	28	22
Seat change	Steady	Steady
Popular vote	1,693,844	1,422,433
Percentage	54.29%	45.59%
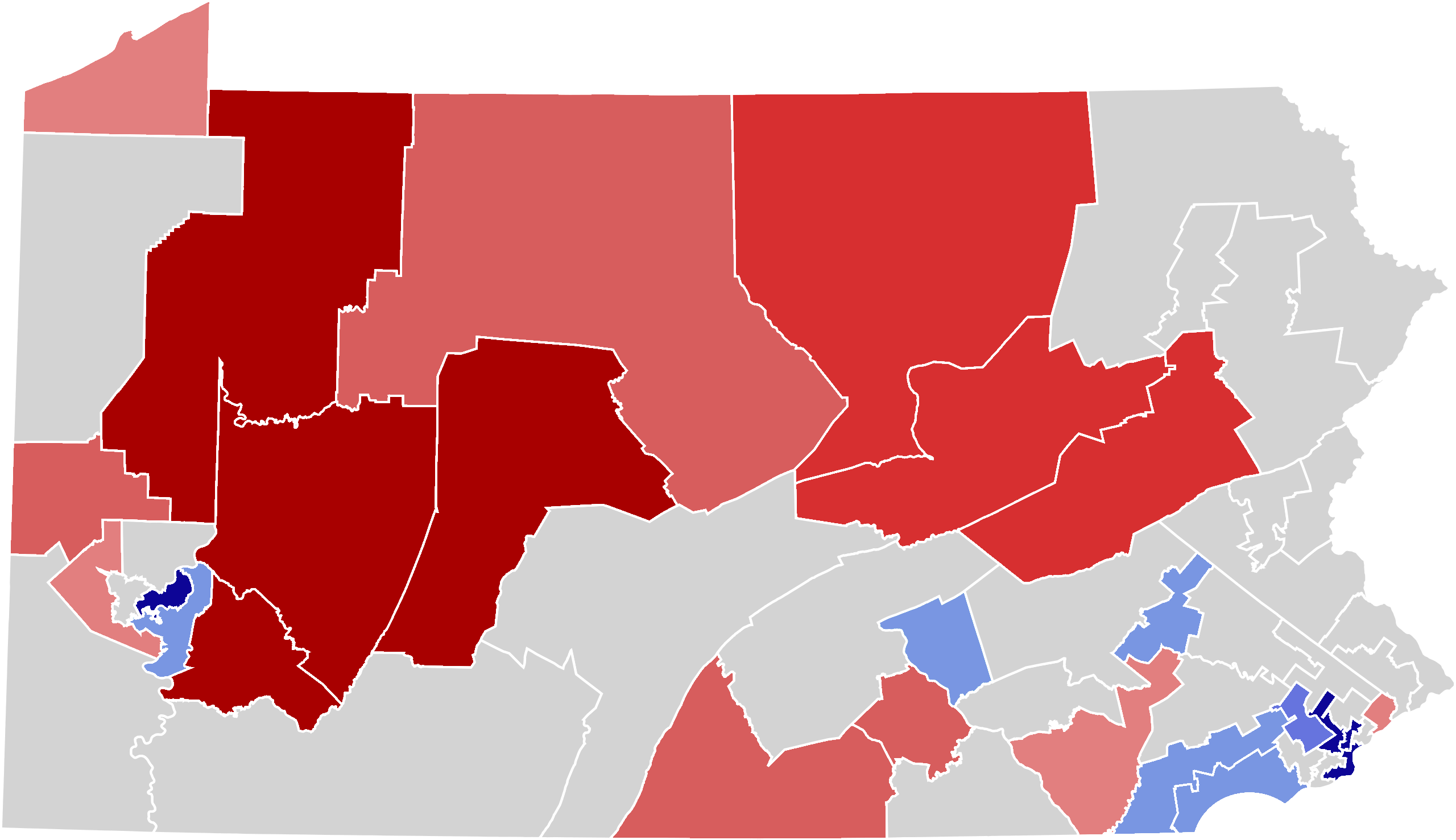
- Democratic hold Republican hold 50–60% 60–70% 70–80% 80–90% >90% 50–60% 60–70% 70–80% 80–90% >90%
President Pro Tempore before election
Kim Ward
Republican
President Pro Tempore
Kim Ward
Republican

Elections for the Pennsylvania State Senate were held on November 5, 2024, with 25 of 50 districts being contested. The term of office for those elected in 2024 will begin when the Senate convenes in January 2025. Pennsylvania State Senators are elected for four-year terms, with half of the seats up for election every two years. The election coincided with the 2024 U.S. presidential election, elections to the U.S. Senate, elections to the U.S. House of Representatives, and elections to the entirety of the Pennsylvania House of Representatives.

Republicans have controlled the chamber since 1994.

== Outgoing incumbents ==
=== Incumbents not seeking re-election ===
==== Democrats ====
1. District 45: Jim Brewster retired.

==== Republicans ====
1. District 15: John DiSanto retired.
2. District 31: Mike Regan retired.

== Primary elections ==
=== Democratic primary ===
2024 Pennsylvania Senate elections Democratic Primary
District	Candidates	Votes	Percent
1	Nikil Saval	Unopposed	
3	Sharif Street	Unopposed	
5	Jimmy Dillon	Unopposed	
7	Vincent Hughes	Unopposed	
9	John I. Kane	Unopposed	
11	Judy Schwank	Unopposed	
13	No candidate filed for party.		
15	Patty Kim	20,729	86.67
15	Alvin Taylor	3,075	12.86
17	Amanda Cappelletti	Unopposed	
19	Carolyn Comitta	Unopposed	
21	No candidate filed for party.		
23	No candidate filed for party.		
25	No candidate filed for party.		
27	Patricia Lawton	Unopposed	
29	John N. Zugarek	Unopposed	
31	Mark Temons	Unopposed	
33	Cameron Schroy	Unopposed	
35	No candidate filed for party.		
37	Nicole Ruscitto	Unopposed	
39	No candidate filed for party.		
41	No candidate filed for party.		
43	Jay Costa	Unopposed	
45	Nick Pisciottano	22,263	72.95
45	Makenzie White	8,068	26.44
47	No candidate filed for party.		
49	Jim Wertz	16,623	67.10
49	Selena King	7,083	28.59

=== Republican primary ===
2024 Pennsylvania Senate elections Republican Primary
District	Candidates	Votes	Percent
1	No candidate filed for party.		
3	No candidate filed for party.		
5	Joseph Samuel Picozzi	Unopposed	
7	No candidate filed for party.		
9	Michael Allan Woodin	Unopposed	
11	Lisha L. Rowe	8,384	76.21
11	Miguel Vasquez	2,528	22.98
13	Scott Martin	Unopposed	
15	Nick DiFrancesco	10,850	54.30
15	Ken Stambaugh	8,996	45.02
17	No candidate filed for party.		
19	Duane Milne	Unopposed	
21	Scott Hutchinson	Unopposed	
23	Eugene Yaw	Unopposed	
25	Cris Dush	Unopposed	
27	Lynda Schlegel Culver	Unopposed	
29	Dave Argall	Unopposed	
31	Dawn Keefer	Unopposed	
33	Doug Mastriano	Unopposed	
35	Wayne Langerholc	Unopposed	
37	Devlin Robinson	Unopposed	
39	Kim Ward	Unopposed	
41	Joe Pittman	Unopposed	
43	No candidate filed for party.		
45	Jen Dintini	10,013	74.30
45	Kami Stulginskas	3,360	24.93
47	Elder Vogel	Unopposed	
49	Dan Laughlin	Unopposed	

== General election ==
=== Predictions ===
Source	Ranking	As of
CNalysis	Likely R	February 29, 2024

=== Overview ===
Statewide Outlook
Affiliation	Candidates	Votes	%	Seats before	Seats up	Seats won	Seats after
Republican	20	1,693,844	54.29%	28	15	15	28
Democratic	17	1,422,433	45.59%	22	10	10	22
Libertarian	1	3,579	0.11%	0	0	0	0
Total	38	3,119,856	100.00%	50	25	25	50

=== Close races ===
Six district races had winning margins of less than 15%:

District	Winner	Margin
District 5	Republican (flip)	0.82%
District 9	Democratic	12.06%
District 19	Democratic	13.02%
District 37	Republican	5.66%
District 45	Democratic	6.13%
District 49	Republican	8.56%

== District breakdown ==
District	Party	Incumbent	Status	Party	Candidate	Votes	%
1	Democratic	Nikil Saval	Re-elected	Democratic	Nikil Saval	109,193	99.00%
3	Democratic	Sharif Street	Re-elected	Democratic	Sharif Street	90,329	99.48%
5	Democratic	Jimmy Dillon	Defeated	Republican	Joe Picozzi	50,570	50.35%
5	Democratic	Jimmy Dillon	Defeated	Democratic	Jimmy Dillon	49,735	49.52%
7	Democratic	Vincent Hughes	Re-elected	Democratic	Vincent Hughes	98,527	99.41%
9	Democratic	John I. Kane	Re-elected	Democratic	John I. Kane	80,793	56.03%
9	Democratic	John I. Kane	Re-elected	Republican	Michael Woodin	63,392	43.97%
11	Democratic	Judy Schwank	Re-elected	Democratic	Judy Schwank	63,214	58.61%
11	Democratic	Judy Schwank	Re-elected	Republican	Lisha Rowe	44,637	41.39%
13	Republican	Scott Martin	Re-elected	Republican	Scott Martin	64,702	59.12%
13	Republican	Scott Martin	Re-elected	Democratic	Trex Proffitt	44,735	40.88%
15	Republican	John DiSanto	Retired	Democratic	Patty Kim	77,155	58.22%
15	Republican	John DiSanto	Retired	Republican	Nick DiFrancesco	55,368	41.78%
17	Democratic	Amanda Cappelletti	Re-elected	Democratic	Amanda Cappelletti	98,939	68.29%
17	Democratic	Amanda Cappelletti	Re-elected	Republican	Greg Harris	45,946	31.71%
19	Democratic	Carolyn Comitta	Re-elected	Democratic	Carolyn Comitta	84,612	56.51%
19	Democratic	Carolyn Comitta	Re-elected	Republican	Duane Milne	65,106	43.49%
21	Republican	Scott Hutchinson	Re-elected	Republican	Scott Hutchinson	115,512	100.00%
23	Republican	Eugene Yaw	Re-elected	Republican	Eugene Yaw	100,523	74.68%
23	Republican	Eugene Yaw	Re-elected	Democratic	Denitra Moffett	34,089	25.32%
25	Republican	Cris Dush	Re-elected	Republican	Cris Dush	87,984	66.44%
25	Republican	Cris Dush	Re-elected	Democratic	William McGill	44,444	33.56%
27	Republican	Lynda Schlegel Culver	Re-elected	Republican	Lynda Schlegel Culver	93,626	72.28%
27	Republican	Lynda Schlegel Culver	Re-elected	Democratic	Patricia Lawton	35,899	27.72%
29	Republican	Dave Argall	Re-elected	Republican	Dave Argall	85,847	71.08%
29	Republican	Dave Argall	Re-elected	Democratic	John Zugarek	31,357	25.96%
29	Republican	Dave Argall	Re-elected	Libertarian	Timothy Henning	3,579	2.96%
31	Republican	Mike Regan	Retired	Republican	Dawn Keefer	80,049	61.00%
31	Republican	Mike Regan	Retired	Democratic	Mark Temons	51,169	39.00%
33	Republican	Doug Mastriano	Re-elected	Republican	Doug Mastriano	98,040	69.03%
33	Republican	Doug Mastriano	Re-elected	Democratic	Cameron Schroy	43,991	30.97%
35	Republican	Wayne Langerholc	Re-elected	Republican	Wayne Langerholc	110,748	100.00%
37	Republican	Devlin Robinson	Re-elected	Republican	Devlin Robinson	79,768	52.77%
37	Republican	Devlin Robinson	Re-elected	Democratic	Nicole Ruscitto	71,203	47.11%
39	Republican	Kim Ward	Re-elected	Republican	Kim Ward	112,588	100.00%
41	Republican	Joe Pittman	Re-elected	Republican	Joe Pittman	111,752	100.00%
43	Democratic	Jay Costa	Re-elected	Democratic	Jay Costa	116,507	100.00%
45	Democratic	Jim Brewster	Retired	Democratic	Nick Pisciottano	69,105	52.98%
45	Democratic	Jim Brewster	Retired	Republican	Jen Dintini	61,117	46.85%
47	Republican	Elder Vogel	Re-elected	Republican	Elder Vogel	96,536	63.85%
47	Republican	Elder Vogel	Re-elected	Democratic	Kate Lennen	54,666	36.15%
49	Republican	Dan Laughlin	Re-elected	Republican	Dan Laughlin	70,088	54.28%
49	Republican	Dan Laughlin	Re-elected	Democratic	Jim Wertz	59,043	45.72%

== See also ==
- 2022 Pennsylvania elections
- Elections in Pennsylvania
- List of Pennsylvania state legislatures
