= 2020 Pennsylvania Senate election =

- November 3, 2020

All odd-numbered seats in the Pennsylvania State Senate 26 seats needed for a majority
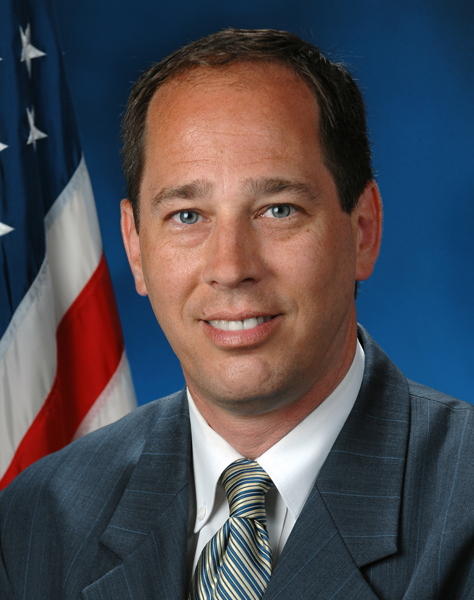

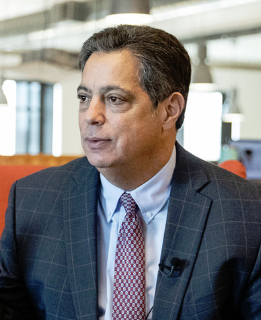
	Majority party	Minority party
Leader	Joe Scarnati	Jay Costa
Party	Republican	Democratic
Leader since	January 2, 2007	January 4, 2011
Leader's seat	25th	43rd
Last election	29	21
Seats before	28	21
Seats won	15	10
Seats after	28	21
Seat change	Steady	Steady
Popular vote	1,636,593	1,580,922
Percentage	50.87%	49.13%
	Third party
Party	Independent
Last election	0
Seats before	1
Seats won	0
Seats after	1
Seat change	Steady
- Results; Democratic hold Democratic gain Republican hold Republican gain No election
President Pro Tempore before election
Joe Scarnati
Republican
President Pro Tempore
Jake Corman
Republican

The 2020 elections for the Pennsylvania State Senate were held on November 3, 2020, with 25 of 50 districts being contested. Primary elections were held on June 2, 2020. The term of office for those elected in 2020 began when the Senate convened in January 2021. Pennsylvania State Senators are elected for four-year terms, with half of the seats up for election every two years. The election coincided with the 2020 United States presidential election, United States House of Representatives elections, and the entirety of the Pennsylvania House of Representatives.

Republicans had controlled the chamber since the 1994 election (26 years).

== Special election ==
=== 48th senatorial district ===
A special election for the 48th senatorial district was held on January 14 following Republican State Senator Mike Folmer's resignation after being arrested for possession of child pornography. Democrats selected Lebanon Valley College associate professor Michael Schroeder as their nominee, while Republicans nominated Lebanon County District Attorney Dave Arnold.

Pennsylvania Senate, District 48 special election, 2020
Party	Candidate	Votes	%
Republican	David Arnold	18,234	68.70
Democratic	Michael Schroeder	9,950	35.30
Total votes		28,184	100.00
Republican hold			

== Predictions ==
Source	Ranking	As of
The Cook Political Report	Lean R	October 21, 2020

== General election overview ==
Statewide results
Affiliation	Candidates	Votes	%	Seats before	Seats up	Seats won	Seats after
Republican	20	1,636,593	50.87	28	15	15	28
Democratic	24	1,580,922	49.13	21	10	10	21
Independent	0	0	0	1	0	0	1
Total	TBD	3,217,515	100	50	25	25	50

Popular vote for 25 Senate seats
Republican	50.87%
Democratic	49.13%

Percentage of 25 Senate seats won
Republican	60%
Democratic	40%

== Close races ==
Six district races had winning margins of less than 15%:

District	Winner	Margin
District 9	Democratic (flip)	3.9%
District 13	Republican	11.26%
District 15	Republican	3.46%
District 19	Democratic	14.90%
District 37	Republican (flip)	4.14%
District 45	Democratic	0.06%

== Results by district ==
District	Party	Incumbent	Status	Party	Candidate	Votes	%
1	Democratic	Larry Farnese	Lost in primary	Democratic	Nikil Saval	121,855	100.00%
3	Democratic	Sharif Street	Unopposed	Democratic	Sharif Street	87,162	100.00%
5	Democratic	John Sabatina	Unopposed	Democratic	John Sabatina	67,365	100.00%
7	Democratic	Vincent Hughes	Unopposed	Democratic	Vincent Hughes	112,759	100.00%
9	Republican	Tom Killion	Defeated	Democratic	John I. Kane	80,083	51.95%
9	Republican	Tom Killion	Defeated	Republican	Tom Killion	74,078	48.05%
11	Democratic	Judy Schwank	Re-elected	Democratic	Judy Schwank	64,011	58.61%
11	Democratic	Judy Schwank	Re-elected	Republican	Annette Baker	45,205	41.39%
13	Republican	Scott Martin	Re-elected	Republican	Scott Martin	73,046	55.63%
13	Republican	Scott Martin	Re-elected	Democratic	Janet Diaz	58,267	44.37%
15	Republican	John DiSanto	Re-elected	Republican	John DiSanto	70,041	51.73%
15	Republican	John DiSanto	Re-elected	Democratic	George Scott	65,366	48.27%
17	Democratic	Daylin Leach	Lost in primary	Democratic	Amanda Cappelletti	104,273	65.85%
17	Democratic	Daylin Leach	Lost in primary	Republican	Ellen Fisher	54,066	34.15%
19	Democratic	Andy Dinniman	Retired	Democratic	Carolyn Comitta	87,636	57.45%
19	Democratic	Andy Dinniman	Retired	Republican	Kevin Runey	64,907	42.55%
21	Republican	Scott Hutchinson	Re-elected	Republican	Scott Hutchinson	96,811	70.93%
21	Republican	Scott Hutchinson	Re-elected	Democratic	Shelbie Stromyer	39,677	29.07%
23	Republican	Eugene Yaw	Re-elected	Republican	Eugene Yaw	86,655	73.10%
23	Republican	Eugene Yaw	Re-elected	Democratic	Jaclyn Baker	31,888	26.90%
25	Republican	Joe Scarnati	Retired	Republican	Cris Dush	88,688	74.43%
25	Republican	Joe Scarnati	Retired	Democratic	Margaret S. Brown	30,457	25.57%
27	Republican	John Gordner	Re-elected	Republican	John Gordner	83,166	72.28%
27	Republican	John Gordner	Re-elected	Democratic	Michelle Siegel	31,891	27.72%
29	Republican	Dave Argall	Unopposed	Republican	Dave Argall	104,193	100.00%
31	Republican	Mike Regan	Re-elected	Republican	Mike Regan	94,459	60.48%
31	Republican	Mike Regan	Re-elected	Democratic	Shanna Danielson	61,714	39.52%
33	Republican	Doug Mastriano	Re-elected	Republican	Doug Mastriano	95,682	68.65%
33	Republican	Doug Mastriano	Re-elected	Democratic	Richard Sterner	43,678	31.35%
35	Republican	Wayne Langerholc	Re-elected	Republican	Wayne Langerholc	91,457	73.64%
35	Republican	Wayne Langerholc	Re-elected	Democratic	Shaun Dougherty	32,742	26.36%
37	Democratic	Pam Iovino	Defeated	Republican	Devlin Robinson	91,092	52.07%
37	Democratic	Pam Iovino	Defeated	Democratic	Pam Iovino	83,845	47.93%
39	Republican	Kim Ward	Re-elected	Republican	Kim Ward	91,938	67.65%
39	Republican	Kim Ward	Re-elected	Democratic	Tay Waltenbaugh	43,970	32.35%
41	Republican	Joe Pittman	Re-elected	Republican	Joe Pittman	91,754	72.83%
41	Republican	Joe Pittman	Re-elected	Democratic	Anthony Deloreto	34,223	27.17%
43	Democratic	Jay Costa	Unopposed	Democratic	Jay Costa	117,255	100.00%
45	Democratic	Jim Brewster	Re-elected	Democratic	Jim Brewster	66,261	50.03%
45	Democratic	Jim Brewster	Re-elected	Republican	Nicole Ziccarelli	66,192	49.97%
47	Republican	Elder Vogel	Re-elected	Republican	Elder Vogel	87,423	66.50%
47	Republican	Elder Vogel	Re-elected	Democratic	Stephen Krizan	44,051	33.50%
49	Republican	Dan Laughlin	Re-elected	Republican	Dan Laughlin	69,813	59.82%
49	Republican	Dan Laughlin	Re-elected	Democratic	Julie Slomski	46,900	40.18%

== See also ==
- 2020 Pennsylvania elections
- 2020 Pennsylvania House of Representatives election
- Elections in Pennsylvania
- List of Pennsylvania state legislatures
