= 2012 Pennsylvania Senate election =

- November 6, 2012

All odd-numbered seats in the Pennsylvania State Senate 26 seats needed for a majority
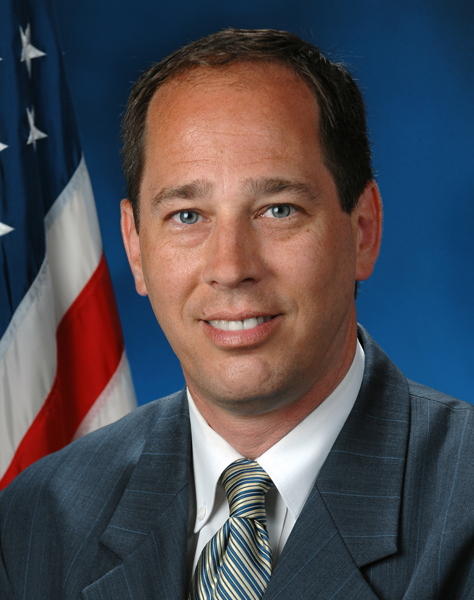

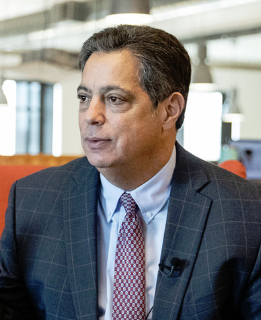
| | Majority party | Minority party |
|---|---|---|
| Leader | Joe Scarnati | Jay Costa |
| Party | Republican | Democratic |
| Leader's seat | 25th district | 43rd District |
| Seats before | 30 | 20 |
| Seats won | 12 | 13 |
| Seats after | 27 | 23 |
| Seat change | ▼3 | ▲3 |
- Results; Democratic gain Democratic hold Republican hold No election

The 2012 elections for the Pennsylvania State Senate were held on November 6, 2012, with all odd-numbered districts being contested. The primary elections were held on April 24, 2012. The term of office for those elected in 2012 began when the Senate convened in January 2013. Pennsylvania State Senators are elected to four-year terms, with 25 of the 50 seats contested every two years.

== Overview ==
| Affiliation | Members |
|---|---|
| Democratic | 23 |
| Republican | 27 |
| Total | 50 |

== Predictions ==
| Source | Ranking | As of |
|---|---|---|
| Governing | Likely R | October 24, 2012 |

== General election ==
| District | Party | Incumbent | Status | Party | Candidate | Votes | % |
|---|---|---|---|---|---|---|---|
| 1 | Democratic | Larry Farnese | Re-elected | Democratic | Larry Farnese | 95,612 | 82.40 |
| 1 | Democratic | Larry Farnese | Re-elected | Republican | Al Gambone | 20,421 | 17.60 |
| 3 | Democratic | Shirley Kitchen | Re-elected | Democratic | Shirley Kitchen | 101,151 | 100.00 |
| 5 | Democratic | Mike Stack | Re-elected | Democratic | Mike Stack | 65,587 | 71.65 |
| 5 | Democratic | Mike Stack | Re-elected | Republican | Mike Tomlinson | 25,954 | 28.35 |
| 7 | Democratic | Vincent Hughes | Re-elected | Democratic | Vincent Hughes | 105,146 | 100.00 |
| 9 | Republican | Dominic Pileggi | Re-elected | Republican | Dominic Pileggi | 73,003 | 55.40 |
| 9 | Republican | Dominic Pileggi | Re-elected | Democratic | Pat Worrell | 58,769 | 44.60 |
| 11 | Democratic | Judy Schwank | Re-elected | Democratic | Judy Schwank | 63,796 | 64.37 |
| 11 | Democratic | Judy Schwank | Re-elected | Republican | Karen Mogel | 35,318 | 35.63 |
| 13 | Republican | Lloyd Smucker | Re-elected | Republican | Lloyd Smucker | 64,153 | 55.72 |
| 13 | Republican | Lloyd Smucker | Re-elected | Democratic | Tom O'Brien | 50,981 | 44.28 |
| 15 | Republican | Jeff Piccola | Retired | Democratic | Rob Teplitz | 61,139 | 51.53 |
| 15 | Republican | Jeff Piccola | Retired | Republican | John McNally | 57,504 | 48.47 |
| 17 | Democratic | Daylin Leach | Re-elected | Democratic | Daylin Leach | 78,508 | 63.20 |
| 17 | Democratic | Daylin Leach | Re-elected | Republican | Charles Gehret | 45,707 | 36.80 |
| 19 | Democratic | Andy Dinniman | Re-elected | Democratic | Andy Dinniman | 83,589 | 57.45 |
| 19 | Democratic | Andy Dinniman | Re-elected | Republican | Chris Amentas | 61,914 | 42.55 |
| 21 | Republican | Mary Jo White | Retired | Republican | Scott Hutchinson | 75,905 | 100.00 |
| 23 | Republican | Gene Yaw | Re-elected | Republican | Gene Yaw | 66,277 | 69.73 |
| 23 | Republican | Gene Yaw | Re-elected | Democratic | Luana Cleveland | 28,771 | 30.27 |
| 25 | Republican | Joe Scarnati | Re-elected | Republican | Joseph B. Scarnati | 75,096 | 100.00 |
| 27 | Republican | John Gordner | Re-elected | Republican | John Gordner | 75,667 | 100.00 |
| 29 | Republican | Dave Argall | Re-elected | Republican | Dave Argall | 56,837 | 56.16 |
| 29 | Republican | Dave Argall | Re-elected | Democratic | Tim Seip | 44,365 | 43.84 |
| 31 | Republican | Pat Vance | Re-elected | Republican | Pat Vance | 123,096 | 100.00 |
| 33 | Republican | Rich Alloway | Re-elected | Republican | Rich Alloway | 81,503 | 70.74 |
| 33 | Republican | Rich Alloway | Re-elected | Democratic | Bruce Neylon | 33,716 | 29.26 |
| 35 | Democratic | John Wozniak | Re-elected | Democratic | John Wozniak | 46,637 | 50.98 |
| 35 | Democratic | John Wozniak | Re-elected | Republican | Tim Houser | 44,844 | 49.02 |
| 37 | Republican | John Pippy | Retired | Democratic | Matthew H. Smith | 70,883 | 52.61 |
| 37 | Republican | John Pippy | Retired | Republican | Dakshinamurthy Raja | 63,854 | 47.39 |
| 39 | Republican | Kim Ward | Re-elected | Republican | Kim Ward | 92,984 | 86.96 |
| 39 | Republican | Kim Ward | Re-elected | Independent | Ron Gazze | 13,946 | 13.04 |
| 41 | Republican | Don White | Re-elected | Republican | Don White | 82,761 | 100.00 |
| 43 | Democratic | Jay Costa | Re-elected | Democratic | Jay Costa | 94,779 | 100.00 |
| 45 | Democratic | Jim Brewster | Re-elected | Democratic | Jim Brewster | 72,189 | 100.00 |
| 47 | Republican | Elder Vogel | Re-elected | Republican | Elder Vogel | 57,613 | 57.06 |
| 47 | Republican | Elder Vogel | Re-elected | Democratic | Kim Villella | 43,348 | 42.94 |
| 49 | Republican | Jane Earll | Retired | Democratic | Sean Wiley | 60,921 | 60.01 |
| 49 | Republican | Jane Earll | Retired | Republican | Janet Anderson | 40,592 | 39.99 |

Source: Pennsylvania Department of State
