= 2016 Pennsylvania Senate election =

- November 8, 2016

All odd-numbered seats in the Pennsylvania State Senate 26 seats needed for a majority
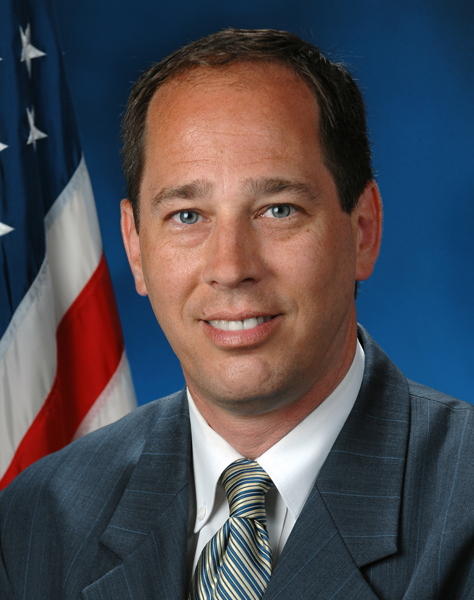

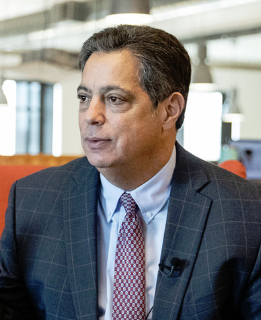
	Majority party	Minority party
Leader	Joe Scarnati	Jay Costa
Party	Republican	Democratic
Leader since	January 2, 2007	January 4, 2011
Leader's seat	25th	43rd
Last election	31	19
Seats won	16	9
Seats after	34	16
Seat change	▲3	▼3
Popular vote	1,467,674	1,272,575
Percentage	53.29%	46.20%
- Results; Republican hold Republican gain Democratic hold No election
President Pro Tempore before election
Joe Scarnati
Republican
President Pro Tempore
Joe Scarnati
Republican

The 2016 elections for the Pennsylvania State Senate were held on November 8, 2016, with all odd-numbered districts being contested. Primary elections were held on April 26, 2016. The term of office for those elected in 2016 began when the Senate convened in January 2017. Pennsylvania state senators are elected to four-year terms, with 25 of the 50 seats contested every two years.

Republicans had controlled the chamber since the 1994 election (22 years as of election day). This was the most recent Pennsylvania senate election in which the Republican party gained seats.

== Overview ==
Affiliation	Candidates	Votes	Vote %	Seats won	Seats after
Republican	19	1,467,674	53.29%	16 (▲3)	34
Democratic	18	1,272,575	46.20%	9 (▼3)	16
Independent	2	14,032	0.51%	0	
Total	39	2,754,281	100%	25	50

== Predictions ==
Source	Ranking	As of
Governing	Likely R	October 12, 2016

== Special election ==
A special election was held on April 26, 2016, to fill the vacancy created by the resignation of Dominic Pileggi on January 5, 2016, after his election to a county judgeship.

District	Party	Incumbent	Status	Party	Candidate	Votes	%
9	Republican	Dominic Pileggi	Resigned	Republican	Thomas Killion	41,613	56.8
9	Republican	Dominic Pileggi	Resigned	Democratic	Martin Molloy	31,533	43
9	Republican	Dominic Pileggi	Resigned	Write-In	Scattered	138	0.2

== General election ==
District	Party	Incumbent	Status	Party	Candidate	Votes	%
1	Democratic	Larry Farnese	Unopposed	Democratic	Larry Farnese	114,099	100
3	Democratic	Shirley Kitchen	Open	Democratic	Sharif Street	98,955	100
5	Democratic	John Sabatina	Won	Democratic	John Sabatina	64,508	67.09
5	Democratic	John Sabatina	Won	Republican	Ross Feinberg	31,644	32.91
7	Democratic	Vincent Hughes	Unopposed	Democratic	Vincent Hughes	108,471	100
9	Republican	Thomas Killion	Won	Republican	Thomas Killion	70,764	51.36
9	Republican	Thomas Killion	Won	Democratic	Martin Molloy	67,011	48.64
11	Democratic	Judy Schwank	Unopposed	Democratic	Judy Schwank	98,370	100
13	Republican	Lloyd Smucker	Open	Republican	Scott Martin	66,595	57.87
13	Republican	Lloyd Smucker	Open	Democratic	Gregory Paulson	48,476	42.13
15	Democratic	Rob Teplitz	Lost	Republican	John DiSanto	62,774	51.72
15	Democratic	Rob Teplitz	Lost	Democratic	Rob Teplitz	58,591	48.28
17	Democratic	Daylin Leach	Won	Democratic	Daylin Leach	88,827	63.98
17	Democratic	Daylin Leach	Won	Republican	Brian Gondek	50,010	36.02
19	Democratic	Andy Dinniman	Won	Democratic	Andy Dinniman	75,615	56.40
19	Democratic	Andy Dinniman	Won	Republican	Jack London	58,456	43.60
21	Republican	Scott Hutchinson	Unopposed	Republican	Scott Hutchinson	101,525	100
23	Republican	Gene Yaw	Unopposed	Republican	Gene Yaw	85,889	100
25	Republican	Joe Scarnati	Won	Republican	Joe Scarnati	76,416	74.84
25	Republican	Joe Scarnati	Won	Democratic	Jerri Buchanan	25,686	25.16
27	Republican	John Gordner	Unopposed	Republican	John Gordner	83,083	100
29	Republican	Dave Argall	Unopposed	Republican	Dave Argall	92,537	100
31	Republican	Pat Vance	Retired	Republican	Mike Regan	87,269	64.61
31	Republican	Pat Vance	Retired	Democratic	John Bosha	38,478	28.49
31	Republican	Pat Vance	Retired	Independent	Kenneth Gehosky	9,331	6.91
33	Republican	Rich Alloway	Unopposed	Republican	Richard Alloway	99,377	100
35	Democratic	John Wozniak	Retired	Republican	Wayne Langerholc	68,397	62.32
35	Democratic	John Wozniak	Retired	Democratic	Ed Cernic, Jr.	41,349	37.68
37	Republican	Guy Reschenthaler	Won	Republican	Guy Reschenthaler	90,987	60.65
37	Republican	Guy Reschenthaler	Won	Democratic	Edward Eichenlaub	59,044	39.35
39	Republican	Kim Ward	Unopposed	Republican	Kim Ward	111,696	100
41	Republican	Don White	Won	Republican	Don White	76,843	68.44
41	Republican	Don White	Won	Democratic	Tony DeLoreto	30,739	27.38
41	Republican	Don White	Won	Independent	Stanley Buggey	4,701	4.19
43	Democratic	Jay Costa	Unopposed	Democratic	Jay Costa	114,984	100
45	Democratic	Jim Brewster	Unopposed	Democratic	Jim Brewster	89,016	100
47	Republican	Elder Vogel	Unopposed	Republican	Elder Vogel	95,622	100
49	Democratic	Sean Wiley	Lost	Republican	Dan Laughlin	57,790	53.44
49	Democratic	Sean Wiley	Lost	Democratic	Sean Wiley	50,356	46.56
