= 2008 Pennsylvania Senate election =

- November 4, 2008

All odd-numbered seats in the Pennsylvania State Senate 26 seats needed for a majority
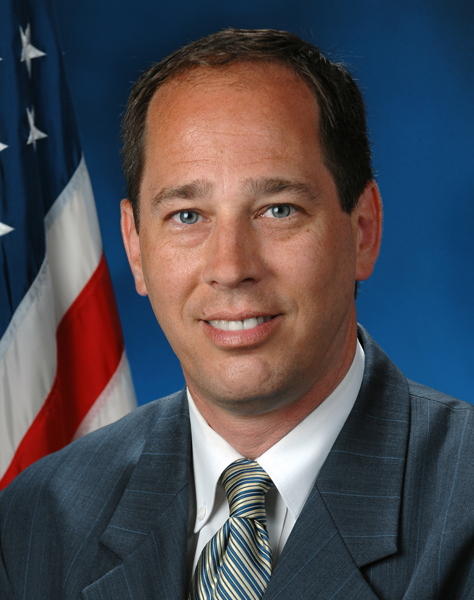

	Majority party	Minority party
Leader	Joe Scarnati	Bob Mellow
Party	Republican	Democratic
Leader's seat	25th District	22nd District
Last election	29	21
Seats won	14	11
Seats after	30	20
Seat change	▲1	▼1
- Results; Democratic hold Republican hold Republican gain No election

Elections for the Pennsylvania State Senate were held on November 4, 2008, with odd-numbered districts being contested. Republicans had a net gain of 1 seat for the 2008 elections, expanding their majority to 30-20. State Senators are elected for four-year terms, with half of the Senate seats up for a vote every two years. The term of office for those elected in 2008 will run from December 1, 2008 until December 1, 2012. Necessary primary elections were held on April 22, 2008.

== Overview ==
Affiliation	Members
Democratic	20
Republican	30
Total	50

== Predictions ==
Source	Ranking	As of
Stateline	Safe R	October 15, 2008

== General Elections ==
(see note)

District	Party	Incumbent	Status	Party	Candidate	Votes	%
1	Democratic	Vincent J. Fumo	retired	Democratic	Larry Farnese	92,088	80.8%
1	Democratic	Vincent J. Fumo	retired	Republican	Jack Morley	21,869	19.2%
3	Democratic	Shirley M. Kitchen	re-elected	Democratic	Shirley M. Kitchen	93,539	88.4%
3	Democratic	Shirley M. Kitchen	re-elected	Republican	Robert Nix	12,270	11.6%
5	Democratic	Michael J. Stack III	re-elected	Democratic	Michael J. Stack III	69,284	72.0%
5	Democratic	Michael J. Stack III	re-elected	Republican	John Farley	69,284	28.0%
7	Democratic	Vincent Hughes	re-elected	Democratic	Vincent Hughes	99,346	85.5%
7	Democratic	Vincent Hughes	re-elected	Republican	Marc Perry	16,860	14.5%
9	Republican	Dominic Pileggi	re-elected	Republican	Dominic Pileggi	74,669	58.1%
9	Republican	Dominic Pileggi	re-elected	Democratic	John Linder	53,795	41.9%
11	Democratic	Michael O'Pake	re-elected	Democratic	Michael O'Pake	73,686	71.4%
11	Democratic	Michael O'Pake	re-elected	Republican	Stephen Fuhs	29,445	28.6%
13	Republican	Gibson E. Armstrong	retired	Republican	Lloyd Smucker	65,708	57.0%
13	Republican	Gibson E. Armstrong	retired	Democratic	Jose Urdaneta	49,515	43.0%
15	Republican	Jeffrey E. Piccola	re-elected	Republican	Jeffrey E. Piccola	63,829	52.0%
15	Republican	Jeffrey E. Piccola	re-elected	Democratic	Judy Hirsch	59,014	48.0%
17	Democratic	Connie Williams	retired	Democratic	Daylin Leach	76,350	61.5%
17	Democratic	Connie Williams	retired	Republican	Lance Rogers	47,873	38.5%
19	Democratic	Andrew Dinniman	re-elected	Democratic	Andrew Dinniman	84,141	57.7%
19	Democratic	Andrew Dinniman	re-elected	Republican	Steven Kantrowitz	61,568	42.3%
21	Republican	Mary Jo White	re-elected	Republican	Mary Jo White	73,472	84.5%
21	Republican	Mary Jo White	re-elected	Libertarian	Mary Lea Lucas	13,477	15.5%
23	Republican	Roger A. Madigan	retired	Republican	Eugene Yaw	61,231	60.2%
23	Republican	Roger A. Madigan	retired	Democratic	Louis Casimir	29,503	29.0%
23	Republican	Roger A. Madigan	retired	Independent	Michael A. Dincher	10,921	10.7%
25	Republican	Joseph B. Scarnati III	re-elected	Republican	Joseph B. Scarnati III	61,553	66.6%
25	Republican	Joseph B. Scarnati III	re-elected	Democratic	Donald Hilliard	30,838	33.4%
27	Republican	John R. Gordner	re-elected	Republican	John R. Gordner	78,881	100%
29	Republican	James J. Rhoades	re-elected^{1}	Republican	James J. Rhoades	67,347	62.9%
29	Republican	James J. Rhoades	re-elected^{1}	Democratic	Peter J. Symons	37,468	35.0%
29	Republican	James J. Rhoades	re-elected^{1}	Independent	Dennis Baylor	2,298	2.1%
31	Republican	Patricia H. Vance	re-elected	Republican	Patricia H. Vance	78,070	70.6%
31	Republican	Patricia H. Vance	re-elected	Democratic	Susan Kiskis	32,524	29.4%
33	Republican	Terry Punt	retired	Republican	Richard Alloway	79,765	68.6%
33	Republican	Terry Punt	retired	Democratic	Bruce Tushingham	36,563	31.4%
35	Democratic	John N. Wozniak	re-elected	Democratic	John N. Wozniak	62,464	65.9%
35	Democratic	John N. Wozniak	re-elected	Republican	Joseph Veranese	32,380	34.1%
37	Republican	John Pippy	re-elected	Republican	John Pippy	87,398	65.8%
37	Republican	John Pippy	re-elected	Democratic	Amy Jude Schmotzer	45,416	34.2%
39	Republican	Bob Regola	retired	Republican	Kim Ward	57,498	54.0%
39	Republican	Bob Regola	retired	Democratic	Tony Bompiani	49,049	46.0%
41	Republican	Donald C. White	re-elected	Republican	Donald C. White	94,512	100%
43	Democratic	Jay Costa, Jr.	re-elected	Democratic	Jay Costa, Jr.	100,574	100%
45	Democratic	Sean F. Logan	re-elected	Democratic	Sean F. Logan	84,210	100%
47	Democratic	Gerald J. La Valle	retired	Republican	Elder Vogel	59,195	56.8%
47	Democratic	Gerald J. La Valle	retired	Democratic	Jason Petrella	44,995	43.2%
49	Republican	Jane M. Earll	re-elected	Republican	Jane M. Earll	61,134	58.1%
49	Republican	Jane M. Earll	re-elected	Democratic	Cindy Purvis	44,173	41.9%

^{1} Senator Rhoades died prior to the election but remained on the ballot. As he was posthumously re-elected, his seat will be filled by a special election.
