= Pennsylvania General Assembly elections, 2008 =

Pennsylvania General Assembly elections, 2008 may refer to:

- Pennsylvania House of Representatives election, 2008
- Pennsylvania State Senate elections, 2008
