= Dinniman =

Dinniman is a surname. Notable people with the surname include:

- Andy Dinniman (born 1944), American politician
- Matt Dinniman (fl. from 2003), American author
