= William Sesler =

American politician

William Graham Sesler
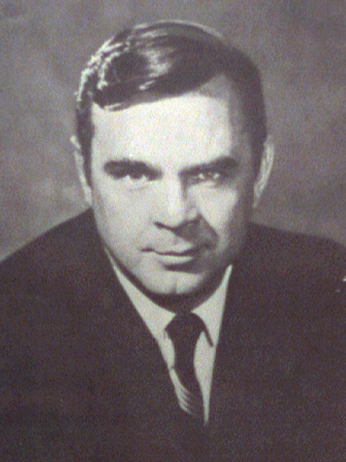

Member of the Pennsylvania Senate from the 49th district
- In office January 1, 1961 – November 30, 1972
- Preceded by: C. Arthur Blass
- Succeeded by: Quentin Orlando
- Constituency: Part of Erie County

Personal details
- Born: April 18, 1928 Uniontown, Pennsylvania, US
- Died: May 22, 2017 (aged 89) Erie, Pennsylvania, US
- Party: Democratic
- Spouse: Cecily P. Sesler
- Children: 3
- Education: University of Michigan
- Occupation: Attorney

Military service
- Allegiance: United States
- Branch/service: United States Air Force
- Years of service: Korean War
- Rank: First Lieutenant

William Graham Sesler (April 18, 1928 – May 22, 2017) was a former Democratic member of the Pennsylvania State Senate, serving from 1961 to 1972. He was an unsuccessful candidate in the 1970 United States Senate election in Pennsylvania against Hugh Scott.

== Biography ==
Born in 1928 to Frederick A. Sesler and Pauline Dixson, Sesler was the youngest of three boys, an older brother, Frederick D. Sesler, and a twin, Thomas R. Sesler. He went to Academy High School.

He attended Kenyon College and joined the United States Air Force during the Korean War. He became a first lieutenant. After serving in the Air Force, he went to University of Michigan Law School.

William worked as an attorney with the firm Sesler & Sesler. He died on May 22, 2017.

Pennsylvania State Senate
Preceded by C. Arthur Blass	Member of the Pennsylvania Senate for the 49th District; 1961–1972	Succeeded by Quentin Orlando
Party political offices
Preceded by Genevieve Blatt	Democratic nominee for U.S. Senator from Pennsylvania (Class 1); 1970	Succeeded by Bill Green
