= Hugh Scott =

American politician (1900–1994)

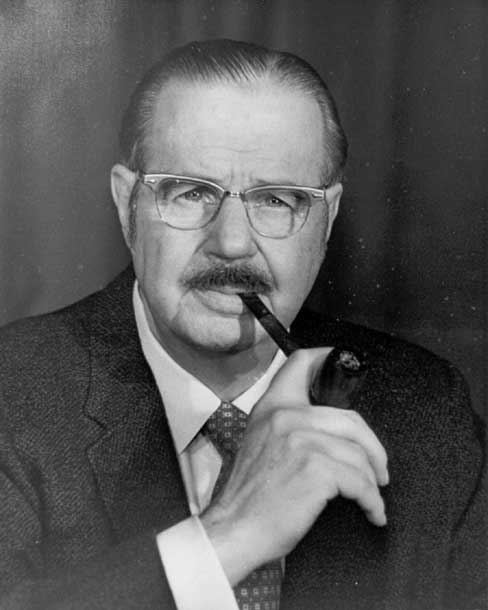

United States Senator from Pennsylvania
- In office January 3, 1959 – January 3, 1977
- Preceded by: Edward Martin
- Succeeded by: John Heinz
Senate positions
Senate Minority Leader
In office September 24, 1969 (Note: Acting: September 5, 1969 – September 24, 1969) – January 3, 1977
Deputy	Robert P. Griffin
Preceded by	Everett Dirksen
Succeeded by	Howard Baker
Leader of the Senate Republican Conference
In office September 24, 1969 – January 3, 1977
Deputy	Robert P. Griffin
Preceded by	Everett Dirksen
Succeeded by	Howard Baker
Senate Minority Whip
In office January 3, 1969 – September 6, 1969
Leader	Everett Dirksen
Preceded by	Thomas Kuchel
Succeeded by	Robert P. Griffin

Chair of the Republican National Committee
- In office June 27, 1948 – August 5, 1949
- Preceded by: B. Carroll Reece
- Succeeded by: Guy Gabrielson

Member of the U.S. House of Representatives from Pennsylvania
- In office January 3, 1947 – January 3, 1959
- Preceded by: Herbert J. McGlinchey
- Succeeded by: Herman Toll
- Constituency: 7th district (1941–1945); 6th district (1947–1959)
- In office January 3, 1941 – January 3, 1945
- Preceded by: George P. Darrow
- Succeeded by: James Wolfenden

Personal details
- Born: November 11, 1900 Fredericksburg, Virginia, U.S.
- Died: July 21, 1994 (aged 93) Falls Church, Virginia, U.S.
- Resting place: Arlington National Cemetery
- Party: Republican
- Spouse: Marian Huntington Chase (m. 1924; died 1987)
- Children: 1
- Parents: Hugh Doggett Scott (father); Jane Lee Lewis (mother)
- Education: Randolph–Macon College (BA); University of Virginia (LLB)
- Occupation: Lawyer; politician

Military service
- Allegiance: United States
- Branch: United States Army; United States Navy; Navy Reserve
- Years of service: 1917–1918 (Army); 1940–1946 (Navy)
- Rank: Cadet (Army); Commander (Navy)
- Conflict: World War I World War II
- Hugh Scott's voice Scott on prosecution of Richard Nixon following the Watergate scandal Recorded August 9, 1974

Hugh Doggett Scott Jr. (November 11, 1900 – July 21, 1994) was an American politician. A member of the Republican Party, he represented Pennsylvania in the U.S. House of Representatives from 1941 to 1945 and from 1947 to 1959 and in the U.S. Senate, from 1959 to 1977. He served as Senate Minority Leader from 1969 to 1977.

Born and educated in Virginia, Scott moved to Philadelphia to join his uncle's law firm. He was appointed as Philadelphia's assistant district attorney in 1926 and remained in that position until 1941. Scott won election to represent Northwest Philadelphia in the House of Representatives in 1940. He lost re-election in 1944 but won his seat back in 1946 and served in the House until 1959. Scott established a reputation as an internationalist and moderate Republican Congressman. After helping Thomas E. Dewey win the 1948 Republican presidential nomination, Scott held the position of Chairman of the Republican National Committee from 1948 to 1949. He also served as Dwight Eisenhower's campaign chairman in the 1952 presidential election.

Scott won election to the Senate in 1958, narrowly prevailing over Democratic Governor George M. Leader. He was a strong advocate for civil rights legislation and voted in favor of the Civil Rights Acts of 1957, 1960, 1964, and 1968, as well as the 24th Amendment to the U.S. Constitution and the Voting Rights Act of 1965, and the confirmation of Thurgood Marshall to the U.S. Supreme Court. He won election as Senate Minority Whip in January 1969 and was elevated to Senate Minority Leader after Everett Dirksen's death later that year. As the Republican leader in the Senate, Scott urged President Richard Nixon to resign in the aftermath of the Watergate Scandal. Scott declined to seek another term in 1976 and retired in 1977.

== Early life and education ==
The son of Hugh Doggett and Jane Lee (née Lewis) Scott, Hugh Doggett Scott was born on an estate in Fredericksburg, Virginia, that was once owned by George Washington. His grandfather served in the Confederate Army during the Civil War under General John Hunt Morgan, and his great-grandmother was the niece of President Zachary Taylor. After attending public schools in Fredericksburg, he studied at Randolph–Macon College in Ashland, Virginia, from which he graduated in 1919. He enrolled in the Student Reserve Officers Training Corps and the Students' Army Training Corps during World War I.

In 1922, Scott earned his law degree from the University of Virginia School of Law at Charlottesville, where he was a member of the Jefferson Literary and Debating Society and the Alpha Chi Rho fraternity. His interest in politics was established after he frequently attended committee hearings in the Virginia House of Delegates.

== Early political career ==
Scott was admitted to the bar in 1922 and then moved to Philadelphia, Pennsylvania, where he joined his uncle's law firm. Two years later, he married Marian Huntington Chase to whom he remained married until her death in 1987. The couple had one daughter, Marian.

Scott, who had become a regular worker for the Republican Party, was appointed assistant district attorney of Philadelphia in 1926 and served in that position until 1941. He claimed to have prosecuted more than 20,000 cases during his tenure. From 1938 to 1940, he served as a member of the Governor's Commission on Reform of the Magistrates System.

== United States House of Representatives ==
In 1940, after longtime Republican incumbent George P. Darrow decided to retire, Scott was elected to the U.S. House of Representatives from Pennsylvania's 7th congressional district. The district was then based in Northwest Philadelphia. He defeated Democratic candidate Gilbert Cassidy by a margin of 3,362 votes. In 1942, he was re-elected to a second term after defeating Democrat Thomas Minehart, a former member of the Philadelphia City Council and future Pennsylvania Treasurer; Scott received nearly 56% of the vote.

In 1943, he became a member of the Virginia Society of the Cincinnati. In 1944, Scott spoke out fearlessly in the House of Representatives accusing President Roosevelt of having dishonestly manipulated the country into war by: a) moving the U.S. battleship fleet from San Diego to Pearl Harbor over the objection of Admiral Richardson (whom Roosevelt then fired) in order to give Japan a target it could reach; b) refusing to give Admiral Kimmel at Pearl Harbor (Richardson's replacement) enough PBY Catalina reconnaissance planes to scout the area around the Hawaiian Islands; and c) by withholding from Admiral Kimmel a message received by the U.S. government from the Australian government on the day before the Pearl Harbor attack that the Japanese fleet was steaming toward Pearl Harbor. In 1944, Scott was defeated for re-election by Democrat Herb McGlinchey, losing by only 2,329 votes.

Scott joined the United States Navy Reserve in 1940. He served during World War II, and was posted to both Iceland with the Atlantic Fleet and the USS New Mexico with the United States Pacific Fleet. He was among US forces that entered Japan on the first day of post-war occupation, and was discharged with the rank of commander.

In 1946, Scott reclaimed his House seat, handily defeating McGlinchey by a margin of more than 23,000 vote by speaking out against both President Franklin D. Roosevelt's "betrayal at Yalta" and communists in Washington, D.C. He was reelected five times, and served until winning election to the U.S. Senate.

During his tenure in the House, Scott established himself as a strong internationalist by voting in favor of foreign aid to both Greece and Turkey and the Marshall Plan. He also earned a reputation as a moderate Republican by supporting public housing, rent control, and the abolition of the poll tax as well as other legislation sought by the Civil Rights Movement. From 1948 to 1949, he served as chairman of the Republican National Committee (RNC); he received the position after helping New York Governor Thomas E. Dewey obtain the Republican nomination in the 1948 presidential election. Facing staunch opposition from Ohio Senator Robert A. Taft, Scott barely survived a no-confidence ballot but still resigned as RNC chairman. He later served as campaign chairman for Dwight Eisenhower during the 1952 presidential election.

== United States Senate ==
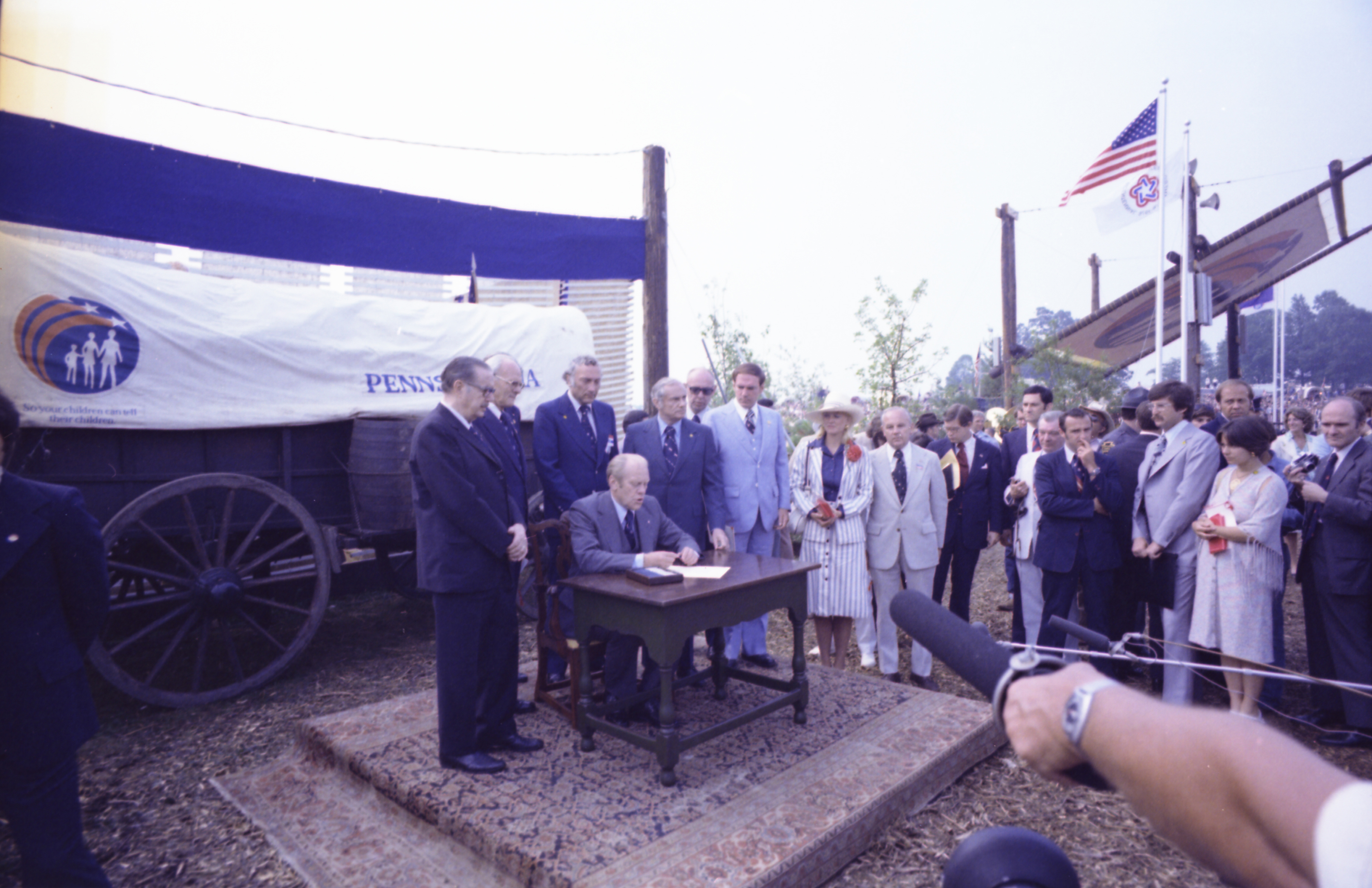
Scott watches as President Gerald Ford signs H.R. 5621, Establishing Valley Forge State Park a National Historical Site on July 4, 1976.

In 1958, after Republican Edward Martin declined to run for re-election, Scott was elected to the United States Senate. He narrowly defeated his Democratic opponent, Governor George M. Leader, by a margin of 51% to 48%. Scott continued his progressive voting record in the Senate by opposing President Eisenhower's veto of a housing bill in 1959 and a redevelopment bill in 1960. He voted to end segregationist Democratic senators' filibuster of the Civil Rights Act of 1960, and he later sponsored 12 bills to implement the recommendations of the Civil Rights Commission. A memorable quote from Scott came during the U-2 Incident in 1960, when he said, "We have violated the eleventh Commandment — Thou Shall Not Get Caught." In April 1962, he joined Senator Kenneth Keating of New York in denouncing a UN resolution condemning Israeli retaliation against Syrian gun positions firing on Israeli fishermen on Lake Tiberias. They criticized the action as a form of evenhandedness that "looks like the palm of the hand for the Arabs and the back of the hand for the Israelis."

In 1962, Scott threatened to run for Governor of Pennsylvania if the Republican Party did not nominate the moderate Representative William W. Scranton over the more conservative Judge Robert E. Woodside, a former Pennsylvania Attorney General. He even supported Scranton as a more liberal alternative to conservative Senator Barry Goldwater for the Republican nomination in the 1964 presidential election. Scott also faced re-election in 1964 and overcame the national landslide for Democratic President Lyndon B. Johnson to defeat the state Secretary of Internal Affairs, Democrat Genevieve Blatt, by approximately 70,000 votes.

Scott voted for the Civil Rights Act of 1964, the Voting Rights Act of 1965, and the Civil Rights Act of 1968. In 1966, along with two other Republican Senators and five Republican Representatives, Scott signed a telegram sent to Georgia Governor Carl Sanders on the Georgia legislature's refusal to seat the recently elected Julian Bond in its state House of Representatives. The refusal, said the telegram, was "a dangerous attack on representative government. None of us agree with Mr. Bond's views on the Vietnam War; in fact we strongly repudiate these views. But unless otherwise determined by a court of law, which the Georgia Legislature is not, he is entitled to express them."

Scott supported New York Governor Nelson Rockefeller for the Republican nomination in the 1968 presidential election. Scott was re-elected in 1970, defeating Democratic State Senator William Sesler by a margin of 51% to 45%. Scott served until January 3, 1977, and was elected Senate Minority Whip in January 1969. On September 5 of that year, Scott was designated as acting minority leader to fill in for the ailing incumbent, Everett Dirksen, who died two days later. On September 24, Scott was narrowly elected Senate Minority Leader over Tennessee Senator Howard Baker (Dirksen's son-in-law), serving until 1977.

In 1967, Scott held a Fellowship at Balliol College, Oxford, where he contributed regularly to Alan Montefiore's politics seminar for postgraduates. Once, when he and Montefiore started talking at the same time, Scott carried on speaking with the amiable excuse: "You can remember what you want to say longer than I can."

Scott was Chairman of the Select Committee on Secret and Confidential Documents (92nd Congress). He wielded tremendous influence.

Scott was displeased with the Richard Nixon administration and believed that it was aloof, unapproachable, and contemptuous of him. Scott believed that he would be given a major role in setting administration policy but was disappointed when that did not occur. Actively assisting in the behind-the-scenes transition from the Nixon administration to the Gerald Ford administration in the months leading up to the resignation of President Richard Nixon, Scott sought assurance from Gerald Ford that Scott would be able to address Ford as "Jerry" even after Ford became president.

Scott was one of the three Republican leaders in Congress to meet Nixon in the Oval Office of the White House to tell Nixon that he had lost support of the party in Congress, on August 7, 1974. The meeting came the day before Nixon would announce his resignation from the presidency. The delegation was led by senior party leader and Arizona Senator Goldwater and also included House Minority Leader John Jacob Rhodes (R-Arizona). The erosion of Nixon's support had progressed after the June 1972 Watergate break-in. At that meeting, Scott and Goldwater told Nixon that, at most, 15 Senators were willing to consider voting to acquit him–not even half of the 34 votes Nixon needed to avoid conviction and removal from office.

In 1976, the Senate undertook an ethics inquiry into accusations that he had received payment from lobbyists for the Gulf Oil Corporation. Scott acknowledged having received $45,000 but claimed that they were legal campaign contributions.

He did not run for re-election in 1976 and was succeeded by Republican John Heinz. The same year, he chaired the Pennsylvania delegation to the Republican National Convention.

== Later life ==
Scott was a resident of Washington, D.C., and then Falls Church, Virginia, until his death there in 1994. He is buried at Arlington National Cemetery. His papers are held at the Albert and Shirley Small Special Collections Library at the University of Virginia.

== Notes ==
U.S. House of Representatives
Preceded by George P. Darrow	Member of the U.S. House of Representatives from Pennsylvania's 7th congressional district 1941–1945	Succeeded by James Wolfenden
Preceded by Herbert J. McGlinchey	Member of the U.S. House of Representatives from Pennsylvania's 6th congressional district 1947–1959	Succeeded by Herman Toll
Party political offices
Preceded by B. Carroll Reece	Chair of the Republican National Committee; 1948–1949	Succeeded by Guy Gabrielson
Preceded by Edward Martin	Republican nominee for U.S. Senator from Pennsylvania (Class 1); 1958, 1964, 1970	Succeeded by John Heinz
Preceded by Everett Dirksen; Gerald Ford	Response to the State of the Union address 1968; Served alongside: Howard Baker, George H. W. Bush, Peter Dominick, Gerald Ford, Robert Griffin, Thomas Kuchel, Mel Laird, Bob Mathias, George Murphy, Dick Poff, Chuck Percy, Al Quie, Charlotte Reid, Bill Steiger, John Tower	Vacant Title next held by Donald Fraser, Scoop Jackson, Mike Mansfield, John McCormack, Patsy Mink, Ed Muskie, Bill Proxmire
Preceded by Thomas Kuchel	Senate Republican Whip; 1969	Succeeded by Robert Griffin
Preceded by Everett Dirksen	Senate Republican Leader; 1969–1977	Succeeded by Howard Baker
U.S. Senate
Preceded by Edward Martin	U.S. Senator (Class 1) from Pennsylvania; 1959–1977; Served alongside: Joe Clark, Richard Schweiker	Succeeded by John Heinz
Preceded by Thomas Kuchel	Senate Minority Whip; 1969	Succeeded by Robert Griffin
Preceded by Everett Dirksen	Senate Minority Leader; 1969–1977	Succeeded by Howard Baker
