= Anthony Andrezeski =

American politician from Pennsylvania

Anthony "Buzz" Andrezeski

Member of the Pennsylvania Senate from the 49th district
- In office 1981–1996
- Preceded by: Quentin R. Orlando
- Succeeded by: Jane Earll
- Constituency: Part of Erie County

Personal details
- Born: November 8, 1947 (age 78)
- Spouse(s): Kathleen Knecht; Daniela Gabor-Andrezeski

Anthony "Buzz" Andrezeski (born November 8, 1947) is a former member of the Pennsylvania State Senate, serving from 1981 to 1996. He was defeated for re-election in 1996 by Jane Earll. He was an unsuccessful candidate for the position of Erie County Chief Executive in 2009.

Andrezeski practices law in western Pennsylvania with an office in Erie, Pennsylvania that focuses on criminal law.
