= Bill Slocum =

American politician (1947–2023)

William L. Slocum

Member of the Pennsylvania Senate from the 25th district
- In office January 7, 1997 – June 1, 2000
- Preceded by: John Peterson
- Succeeded by: Joe Scarnati

Personal details
- Born: November 21, 1947 Franklin, Pennsylvania, U.S.
- Died: March 30, 2023 (aged 75) Erie, Pennsylvania, U.S.
- Party: Republican
- Spouse: Connie Lind
- Children: 2 children

William L. Slocum (November 21, 1947 – March 30, 2023) was an American politician who was a Republican member of the Pennsylvania State Senate.

Slocum pleaded guilty and spent a month in federal prison for filing false reports to the Pennsylvania Department of Environmental Protection and discharging raw sewage into Brokenstraw Creek while he was a sewage plant manager in Youngsville, Pennsylvania.

Slocum died in Erie, Pennsylvania on March 30, 2023, at the age of 75.

Pennsylvania State Senate
Preceded by John Peterson	Member of the Pennsylvania Senate for the 25th District; 1997–2000	Succeeded by Joe Scarnati
