= Robert J. Thompson =

American politician

Member of the Pennsylvania Senate from the 19th district
- In office December 4, 1995 – January 28, 2006
- Preceded by: Earl Baker
- Succeeded by: Andy Dinniman

Member of the Chester County Board of Commissioners
- In office January 7, 1980 – January 6, 1986
- Preceded by: Robert Strebl
- Succeeded by: Irene Brooks

Personal details
- Born: November 30, 1937 West Chester, Pennsylvania
- Died: January 28, 2006 (aged 68) Hospital of the University of Pennsylvania
- Party: Republican
- Spouse: Nancy B.
- Children: 3 children
- Education: Penn State University
- Occupation: Journalist, Politician

Robert J. Thompson (November 30, 1937 – January 28, 2006) was an American politician from Pennsylvania who served as a Republican member of the Pennsylvania State Senate for the 19th district from 1995 to 2006.

== Early life ==
Thompson was born in West Chester, Pennsylvania, to Joseph H. and Winifred Thompson. He earned a degree in journalism from Penn State University in 1959. He then worked as a photographer for the Philadelphia Evening Bulletin, published in-house magazines for Electric Hose & Rubber Corp. in Wilmington and Lukens Steel Company, and Fidelity Bank. He was the founding director of the Chester County Chamber of Commerce.

== Political career ==
Thompson served on the West Goshen Township Board of Supervisors from 1970 through 1976. In 1979, he was elected to the Chester County, Pennsylvania Board of Commissioners, a position he held until 1986.

=== State Senate elections ===
He was first elected to represent the 19th senatorial district in the Pennsylvania Senate in a special election held on November 7, 1995. The special election was triggered by the August resignation of incumbent Republican Earl Baker, with whom Thompson had previously served on the Chester County Board of Commissioners. Thompson defeated Democrat Sara Nichols (along with Libertarian candidate Thomas McGrady Jr.) by a relatively narrow margin. Thompson's margin of victory was considered stunningly narrow by many political observers.

Pennsylvania Senate, District 19: November 7, 1995 Special Election
Party	Candidate	Votes	%	±%
Republican	Bob Thompson	20,004	51.3	
Democratic	Sara Nichols	16,910	43.4	
Libertarian	Thomas McGrady, Jr.	2,073	.05	
Republican hold				

After filing paperwork to challenge Thompson once again the following year, this time for a full term, Nichols withdrew from the race and moved out of the area. By virtue of her stunningly strong showing in the special election, many observers expected the rematch to be close, but Nichols' withdrawal and move was prompted by her husband's acceptance of a position in the Los Angeles area. Democrats selected Downingtown area native and inventory planner Thomas Bosak as Nichols' replacement on the ballot. Thompson went on to defeat Bosak handily.

Thompson easily won election to a second full term in 2000, once again defeating Bosak by a wide margin. He was re-elected once again in 2004, this time without any Democratic opposition.

=== Later political career ===
Thompson was elected Majority Appropriations Chairman by the Senate Republican Caucus in 2001. In 2003, The Pennsylvania Report named him to "The Pennsylvania Report Power 75" list of influential figures in Pennsylvania politics.

== Death ==
He died on January 28, 2006, from pulmonary fibrosis at the Hospital of the University of Pennsylvania The ensuing special election triggered by his death was won by Democrat Andy Dinniman, who defeated Republican Carol Aichele in a stunning upset, becoming the first Democrat elected to represent Chester County in the state Senate since 1890.

== Legacy ==
In 2006, Congress passed Public Law 109-336, naming the US Post Office in West Chester, Pennsylvania after Thompson.

In 2012, a section of Pennsylvania Route 3 was named the Robert J. Thompson Highway in his honor.
