= Dan Laughlin =

American politician (born c.1962)

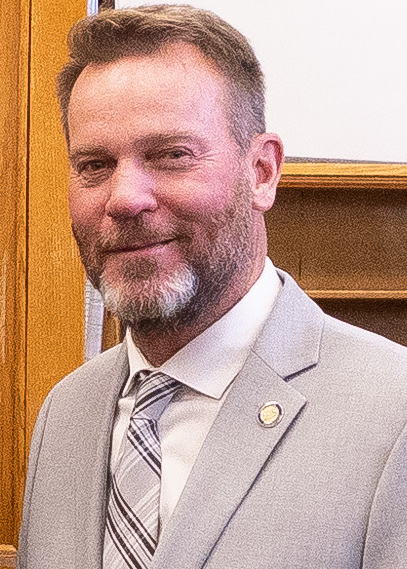

Member of the Pennsylvania Senate from the 49th district
- Incumbent
- Assumed office January 3, 2017
- Preceded by: Sean Wiley

Personal details
- Born: c. 1962 Erie, Pennsylvania, U.S.
- Party: Republican
- Spouse: Peggy Schneider (m. 1988)
- Children: 3

Daniel J. Laughlin (born c. 1962) is an American politician currently representing the 49th district in the Pennsylvania State Senate as Republican since 2017.

== Early life ==
Laughlin was born in Erie, Pennsylvania. One of four children of Dave, a World War II veteran and union carpenter, and Shirley, a former plane factory worker, he was raised in Erie Heights housing project. He graduated from Penn State Behrend.

== Business career ==
Laughlin joined his brother's homebuilding company and later bought into it as a full partner. The brothers would also found companies focusing on trash disposal, foam installation, and rentals.

== Political career ==
Laughlin was first elected to represent the 49th district in the Pennsylvania State Senate in 2016. Laughlin won that election in an upset, defeating incumbent senator Sean Wiley with 53% of the vote.

For the 2025-2026 Session Laughlin sits on the following committees in the State Senate:

- Law & Justice (Chair)
- Game & Fisheries (Vice Chair)
- Appropriations
- Environmental Resources & Energy
- Finance
- Health & Human Services
- Labor & Industry

== Political positions ==
After deciding not to run for governor of Pennsylvania in 2022, the Erie Times-News surmised Laughlin would have "fashioned himself as a centrist who could win independents, moderate Democrats and Republicans in a field of 'far-right' GOP candidates" had he run. Journalist Katie Meyer wrote that Laughlin would have been "most moderate candidate in the Republican gubernatorial field." Despite his affiliation as Republican, Laughlin has occasionally bucked the party's policy position. Unlike most in his party, Laughlin has endorsed the idea of legalized recreational marijuana and increasing the minimum wage. He also opposes changing Pennsylvania's abortions laws.

=== 2020 presidential election ===
Laughlin opposed efforts to audit the 2020 United States presidential election in Pennsylvania, subsequent efforts assemble a slate of fake electors, and the false claims of voter fraud after President Donald Trump lost the election. Privately, Laughlin referred to legal efforts to overturn the election results as "crap." He also blamed Congressman Mike Kelly for "hurting" the Republican Party by supporting such efforts. Publicly, Laughlin warned that Republicans' focus on dubious election fraud would only serve to benefit liberal candidates. He did however still sign the Amicus Brief supporting the efforts of Texas legislators to overturn the election results in his home state of Pennsylvania.

==== Erie Reader lawsuit ====
In August 2022, Laughlin sued the chair of the Erie County Democratic Party, Jim Wertz, as well as the alternative newspaper the Erie Reader, after the Reader published an op-ed written by Wertz which claimed Laughlin was on a presidential pardon request list for those involved in attempts to overturn the 2020 United States presidential election. In the op-ed, Wertz referenced a letter by Congressman Mo Brooks, which said the Congressman had asked then-President Donald Trump for pardons for those who signed "the" amicus brief in the case Texas v. Pennsylvania, which sought to overturn Trump's loss in the 2020 presidential election. Wertz also accused Congressman Mike Kelly of being on the same "pardon request list" as Laughlin. In Texas, Kelly and Laughlin signed separate briefs. The brief Laughlin signed stated the signatories were not supporting the plaintiff nor defendant, but were instead informing the court of what they claimed was overreach into the electoral process by the administration of Governor Tom Wolf and the Pennsylvania Supreme Court, whereas the brief Kelly signed explicitly sided with Texas. Laughlin's lawsuit also contended there was never an actual "pardon request list." Among his claimed losses was a "loss of consortium" where he claimed that the article ended his sex life for a time, that claim was dropped in September 2024. The lawsuit was settled in December 2024, with the Reader agreeing to label Wertz's column as an opinion piece with no admission of liability.

In June 2024, the Reader sued McLaughlin and his wife, Peggy, accusing the couple of removing hundreds of free copies of the publication from public locations. His wife admitted to removing papers to "prevent maybe somebody from reading all of the ridiculous, unjustified, completely dishonest, unprovoked attacks on my husband." The Reader's suit was dismissed in August.

=== Cannabis ===
Laughlin was the first Pennsylvania Republican to endorse the legalization of adult-use cannabis in Pennsylvania. In 2021, Laughlin and State Senator Sharif Street sponsored a bill to legalize cannabis use for individuals over the age of twenty-one. Additionally, the bill would have expunged the criminal records of those with nonviolent marijuana convictions and allowed medical marijuana users to grow no more than five plants in their home. Laughlin and Street had previously sponsored a similar bill in 2019 and later again in 2025. Laughlin said his support for such bills comes from concern for Pennsylvanians consuming unregulated cannabis from outside the state. In 2024, Laughlin proposed a bill that would allow medical marijuana users to legally possess a firearm. In May 2025, Laughlin, acting as chair of the Senate Law and Justice Committee, called a vote on a bill creating state run cannabis dispensaries, similar to liquor stores operated by the Pennsylvania Liquor Control Board. He then voted against advancing the legislation after seeing little chance for the legal framework to pass in the state Senate.

=== Criminal justice ===
Laughlin opposes cashless bail. He has also introduced a bill mandating Pennsylvania prosecutors inform U.S. Immigration and Customs Enforcement when they have illegal immigrants in custody.

=== Election reform ===
Laughlin is a longtime supporter of open primary elections and has repeatedly co-sponsored legislation that would allow independent voters to participate in primary elections.

Laughlin supports voter ID and sponsored a bill that would require mail-in ballots be transported by the U.S. Postal Service, replacing the option of ballot drop boxes.

=== Energy ===
Laughlin has supported expanding Pennsylvania's use of renewable energy sources, including solar energy.

=== Minimum wage ===
In 2023, Laughlin introduced a bill that would raise Pennsylvania's $7.25 minimum wage to $11 by the next year and $15 by the following year. In 2025, he introduced a similarly structured bill with $11 as the final minimum wage.

=== Refugees ===
In 2021, Laughlin said refugees coming to America from Afghanistan should be "thoroughly vetted," but pushed back against statements by other Republicans who opposed refugee resettlement. Laughlin said that those fleeing Taliban rule should be welcomed to a nation with more freedom than their homeland.

== Personal life ==
Laughlin married his wife Peggy Schneider on June 18, 1988. The couple have three children.

== Electoral history ==
2016 Pennsylvania Senate election, District 49
Party	Candidate	Votes	%
Republican	Dan Laughlin	57,790	53.44
Democratic	Sean Wiley (incumbent)	50,356	46.56
Total votes		108,146	100.00

2020 Pennsylvania Senate election, District 49
Party	Candidate	Votes	%
Republican	Dan Laughlin (incumbent)	69,743	59.81
Democratic	Julie L. Slomski	46,867	40.19
Total votes		116,610	100.00

2024 Pennsylvania Senate election, District 49
Party	Candidate	Votes	%
Republican	Dan Laughlin (incumbent)	71,293	54.06
Democratic	Jim Wertz	60,457	45.84
Write-in		123	0.09
Total votes		131,873	100.00
