= 1958 United States Senate election in Pennsylvania =

- November 4, 1958
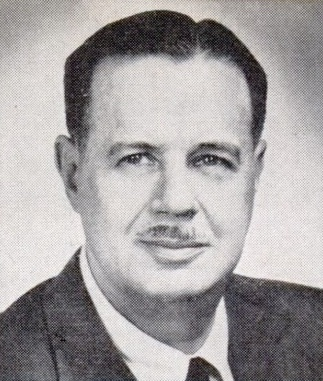

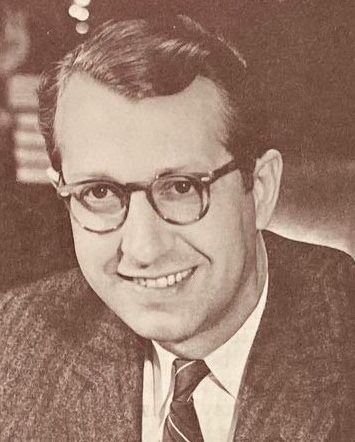
Nominee	Hugh Scott	George M. Leader
Party	Republican	Democratic
Popular vote	2,042,586	1,929,821
Percentage	51.21%	48.38%
- County results Scott: 40–50% 50–60% 60–70% 70–80% Leader: 40–50% 50–60%
U.S. senator before election
Edward Martin
Republican
Elected U.S. Senator
Hugh Scott
Republican

The 1958 United States Senate election in Pennsylvania was held on November 4, 1958. Incumbent Republican U.S. Senator Edward Martin did not seek re-election. The Republican nominee, Hugh Scott, defeated Democratic nominee George M. Leader for the vacant seat.

As of 2026, this is the last Senate election where Fulton County voted Democratic.

== General election ==
=== Candidates ===
- George M. Leader, Governor of Pennsylvania (Democratic)
- Hugh Scott, U.S. Representative from Northwest Philadelphia (Republican)

=== Results ===
General election results
Party	Candidate	Votes	%	±%
Republican	Hugh Scott	2,042,586	51.21%	−0.37%
Democratic	George M. Leader	1,929,821	48.38%	+0.40%
Socialist Labor	George S. Taylor	10,431	0.26%	+0.26%
Socialist Workers	Ethel Peterson	5,742	0.14%	+0.14%
N/A	Other	42	0.00%	N/A
Totals		3,988,622	100.00%	
Republican hold				

== See also ==
- 1958 United States Senate elections
