= Pennsylvania's 15th Senate district =

American legislative district

Pennsylvania's 15th State Senate district
Senator
Patty Kim; D–Harrisburg
- Population (2021): 260,164

Pennsylvania State Senate District 15 includes part of Dauphin County. It is currently represented by Democrat Patty Kim.

== District profile ==
The district includes the following areas:

- Conewago Township
- Dauphin
- Derry Township
- East Hanover Township
- Harrisburg
- Highspire
- Hummelstown
- Londonderry Township
- Lower Paxton Township
- Lower Swatara Township
- Middle Paxton Township
- Middletown
- Paxtang
- Penbrook
- Royalton
- South Hanover Township
- Steelton
- Susquehanna Township
- Swatara Township
- West Hanover Township

== Senators ==
Representative	Party	Years	District home	Note
James Poe	Democratic-Republican	1803 – 1818		
Robert Smith	Democratic-Republican	1819 – 1822		
John Rea	Democratic-Republican	1823 – 1824		
James Dunlop	Federalist	1823 – 1826		
David Fullerton	Anti-Masonic	1827 – 1838		U.S. Representative for Pennsylvania's 5th district from 1819 to 1820. Pennsylvania State Senator for the 14th district from 1839 to 1840
Samuel M. Barclay	National Republican	1837 – 1840		
George Shannon Mullin, Sr.	Whig	1841 – 1842		Pennsylvania State Senator for the 19th district from 1843 to 1844
Henry C. Eyer	Democratic	1845 – 1846		Pennsylvania State Senator for the 8th district from 1843 to 1844
Jacob Wagenseller	Whig	1845 – 1848		
Jonathan J. Cunningham	Whig	1849 – 1850		
Robert Allison McMurtrie	Whig	1851 – 1852		
Ner Middleswarth	Whig	1853 – 1854		Pennsylvania State Representative from 1815 to 1841. U.S. Representative for Pennsylvania's 10th congressional district from 1853 to 1855
John Creswell, Jr.	Democratic	1853 – 1858		Pennsylvania State Senator for the 20th district from 1859 to 1860
John Brisban Rutherford	Republican	1857 – 1860	Paxton	Former Cavalry officer
Amos R. Boughter	Republican	1861 – 1863	Lebanon	Refused re-election to join the 43rd Pennsylvania Militia Infantry Regiment in the American Civil War
David Fleming	Republican	1863 – 1864	West Hanover	Pennsylvania State Senator for the 16th district from 1865 to 1866
David B. Montgomery	Democratic	1865 – 1866		Pennsylvania State Senator for the 13th district from 1863 to 1864
George Duggan Jackson	Democratic	1867 – 1868		Pennsylvania State Senator for the 24th district from 1879 to 1880
Thomas Chalfant	Democratic	1873 – 1874		
Andrew Jackson Herr	Republican	1875 – 1880		
Alexander F. Thompson	Republican	1885 – 1892		
Samuel John Milton McCarrell	Republican	1893 – 1900		
John E. Fox	Republican	1901 – 1912		
Edward Ensinger Beidleman	Republican	1913 – 1918		Pennsylvania State Representative for Dauphin County from 1905 to 1908. 12th Lieutenant Governor of Pennsylvania from 1919 to 1923
Frank A. Smith	Republican	1919 – 1924		
William H. Earnest	Republican	1925 – 1932		
George Leffingwell Reed	Republican	1933 – 1936		
George Kunkel	Democratic	1937 – 1940		
M. Harvey Taylor	Republican	1941 – 1964		
William B. Lentz	Republican	1965 – 1976		
George W. Gekas	Republican	1977 – 1982		U.S. Representative for Pennsylvania's 17th congressional district from 1983 to 2003
John J. Shumaker	Republican	1983 – 1995		Seated April 11, 1983, to fill vacancy. Resigned August 31, 1995
Jeffrey E. Piccola	Republican	1995 – 2012		Pennsylvania State Representative for the 104th district from 1977 to 1995.
Rob Teplitz	Democratic	2013 – 2017	Susquehanna Township	
John DiSanto	Republican	2017 – 2024		
Patty Kim	Democratic	2025 – present	Harrisburg	

== Recent election results ==
PA Senate election, 2024: Pennsylvania Senate, District 15
Party	Candidate	Votes	%
Democratic	Patty Kim	77,155	58.22
Republican	Nick DiFrancesco	55,368	41.78
Total votes		132,523	100.0
Democratic gain from Republican			

PA Senate election, 2020
Party	Candidate	Votes	%
Republican	John DiSanto (incumbent)	70,041	51.7
Democratic	George Scott	65,366	48.3
Total votes		135,407	100.0
Republican hold			

PA Senate election, 2016
Party	Candidate	Votes	%
Republican	John DiSanto	62,774	51.7
Democratic	Rob Teplitz (incumbent)	58,591	48.3
Total votes		121,365	100.0
Republican gain from Democratic			

PA Senate election, 2012
Party	Candidate	Votes	%
Democratic	Rob Teplitz	61,139	51.5
Republican	John McNally	57,504	48.5
Total votes		118,643	100.0
Democratic gain from Republican			

PA Senate election, 2008
Party	Candidate	Votes	%
Republican	Jeffrey Piccola (incumbent)	63,829	52.0
Democratic	Judy Hirsch	59,014	48.0
Total votes		122,843	100.0
Republican hold			
