= Rob Teplitz =

American politician

Member of the Pennsylvania Senate from the 15th district
- In office January 1, 2013 – November 30, 2016
- Preceded by: Jeffrey Piccola
- Succeeded by: John DiSanto

Personal details
- Born: December 20, 1970 (age 55) Miami, Florida
- Party: Democratic
- Spouse: Randi Teplitz
- Children: Two
- Education: Franklin & Marshall College (B.A.); Cornell Law School (J.D.)

Robert F. Teplitz (born December 20, 1970) is an American lawyer and politician who served as a Democratic member of the Pennsylvania State Senate for the 15th district, based in the state capital of Harrisburg, from 2013 to 2016. He was the first Democrat to represent this district since 1941, and only the second Democrat to win the seat since 1875.

== Early life and education ==
Teplitz was born December 20, 1970, in Miami, Florida. He was raised in Central Pennsylvania and graduated from Central Dauphin High School, Franklin & Marshall College and Cornell Law School.

== Career ==
Prior to being elected to the State Senate in 2012, Teplitz served as an adviser to Pennsylvania Auditor General Jack Wagner. He was defeated by John DiSanto in the 2016 election. After his term expired, he accepted a job as a policy adviser to the Pennsylvania Senate Democratic Caucus.
