= George Kunkel (politician) =

American politician (1893–1965)

Member of the Pennsylvania Senate from the 15th district
- In office 1937–1941
- Preceded by: George Leffingwell Reed
- Succeeded by: M. Harvey Taylor

Personal details
- Born: March 10, 1893 Harrisburg, Pennsylvania, US
- Died: May 18, 1965 (aged 72) Harrisburg, Pennsylvania, US
- Party: Democratic
- Education: Franklin & Marshall College (1915), Dickinson Law School (1920)

George Kunkel (March 10, 1893 – May 18, 1965) was an American lawyer and politician from Pennsylvania who served as a Democratic member of the Pennsylvania Senate for the 15th district from 1937 to 1941.

== Early life and education ==
Kunkel was born in Harrisburg, Pennsylvania, and went to the public schools. He graduated from the Harrisburg Academy and Franklin & Marshall College in 1915. He attended law school at Harvard Law School from 1915 to 1917.

He attended Officer's Training Camp at Fort Niagara in New York and was commissioned second lieutenant in September 1917. He was sent to Camp Meade in Maryland and assigned to the 30th Machine Gun Battalion. He spent nine months at Camp Meade then in July 1918 was assigned to the 79th Infantry Division of the American Expeditionary Forces (AEF). He saw active duty during the Meuse–Argonne offensive in and was promoted to first lieutenant. He served in France during World War I for 10 months. He returned to the United States in June, 1919 and was honorably discharged.

In 1920, Kunkel graduated from Dickinson School of Law with A.M. and LL.B. degrees and was admitted to the Dauphin County bar.

== Career ==
He practiced law in Harrisburg and served on the Dauphin County Commissioners Board. Kunkel was involved with the Democratic Party. Kunkel served in the Pennsylvania Senate for the 15th district from 1937 to 1941. He died at the Harrisburg Hospital from heart problems.
