= Quentin Orlando =

American politician

Quentin R. Orlando

Member of the Pennsylvania Senate from the 49th district
- In office 1973–1980
- Preceded by: William G. Sesler
- Succeeded by: Anthony Andrezeski
- Constituency: Part of Erie County

Personal details
- Born: November 8, 1919 Erie, Pennsylvania
- Died: January 22, 2011 (aged 91) Erie, Pennsylvania
- Party: Democratic
- Occupation: Optometrist and politician

Quentin R. Orlando (November 8, 1919 – January 22, 2011) was a former Democratic member of the Pennsylvania State Senate, serving from 1973 to 1980. He was the first individual with a Doctor of Optometry to be elected to the Pennsylvania General Assembly. He and fellow Senator Lou Coppersmith were the main sponsors of the "Diagnostic Drug Bill."

He served two terms as a member of the Erie City Council. He practiced optometry in the Erie, Pennsylvania area for over fifty years. He served two stints on the Pennsylvania State Board of Optometry, once during the late 1960s and early 1970s as an appointee of Governor Raymond P. Shafer and later during the late 1990s and early 2000s as an appointee of Governor Tom Ridge.
