= Gerald LaValle =

American politician

Gerald J. LaValle

Member of the Pennsylvania Senate from the 47th district
- In office June 4, 1990 – November 30, 2008
- Preceded by: James Ross
- Succeeded by: Elder Vogel
- Constituency: Parts of Allegheny, Beaver, and Lawrence Counties

Personal details
- Born: January 25, 1932 Rochester, Pennsylvania, U.S.
- Died: September 12, 2018 (aged 86) Beaver, Pennsylvania, U.S.
- Party: Democratic
- Spouse: Darla J.
- Children: 2 children
- Education: Geneva College; Westminster College
- Occupation: Educator

Military service
- Allegiance: United States
- Branch/service: United States Marine Corps and United States Marine Corps Reserve
- Years of service: 1956—1981
- Rank: Lieutenant colonel
- Unit: 4th Marine Division

Gerald J. LaValle (January 25, 1932 – September 12, 2018) was an American politician who was a member of the Democratic Party in the Pennsylvania State Senate.

== Biography ==
A native of Beaver County, Pennsylvania, he earned a degree from Geneva College in 1956 and a Master of Education from Westminster College in New Wilmington, Pennsylvania, in 1971. He worked as a teacher, guidance counselor, and athletic coach at Midland High School and Rochester Area High School from 1959 to 1984.

He served in the borough government of Rochester, Pennsylvania, as councilman from 1973 to 1976 and mayor from 1976 to 1988. He then served as County Commissioner of Beaver County. He was elected to represent the 47th senatorial district in the Pennsylvania Senate in a 1990 special election. Within the Democratic caucus, he was elected Minority Caucus Secretary in 2005 and Minority Appropriations Committee Chairman on February 6, 2007.

In 2007 and 2008, LaValle was investigated by the Pennsylvania Attorney General for his connections to two separate Beaver County non-profit organizations. The Beaver Initiative for Growth, an $11 million community development nonprofit founded by LaValle and State Representative Mike Veon, was implicated for loose financial management. The second, the Voluntary Action Center, was a small nonprofit call center partially funded by the Beaver Initiative for Growth and operated by LaValle's wife, Darla LaValle.

Investigations into the Voluntary Action Center began when Darla LaValle repaid the organization about $50,000 in "unauthorized compensation." On August 18, 2008, Pennsylvania Attorney General Tom Corbett charged LaValle's wife, Darla LaValle, with stealing thousands of dollars, inflating her salary, and denying employees pension benefits while serving as executive director of the Voluntary Action Center.

He retired following the 2008 Pennsylvania Senate elections.

== Death ==
LaValle died on September 12, 2018, at the age of 86.
