= 1970 United States Senate election in Pennsylvania =

- November 3, 1970
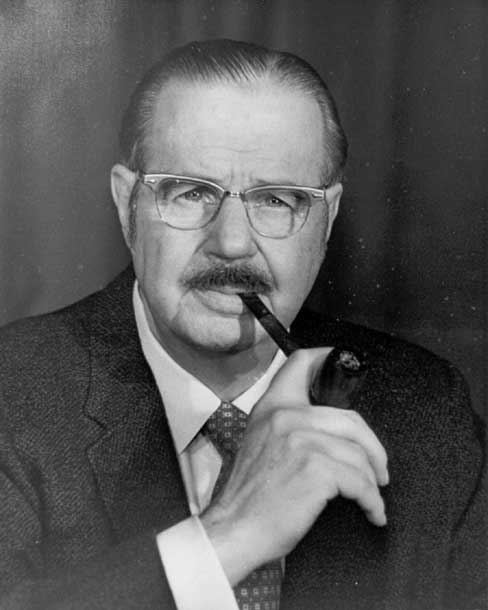

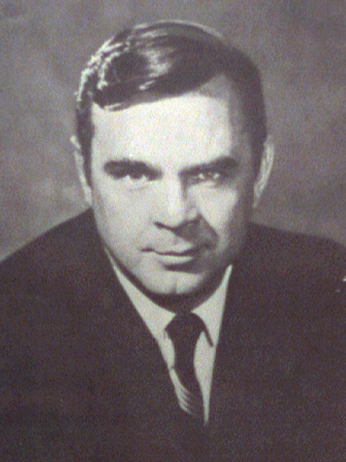
Nominee	Hugh Scott	William Sesler
Party	Republican	Democratic
Popular vote	1,874,106	1,653,774
Percentage	51.43%	45.38%
- County results Scott: 40–50% 50–60% 60–70% 70–80% Sesler: 40–50% 50–60%
U.S. senator before election
Hugh Scott
Republican
Elected U.S. Senator
Hugh Scott
Republican

The 1970 United States Senate election in Pennsylvania was held on November 3, 1970. Incumbent Republican U.S. Senator Hugh Scott won re-election, defeating Democratic nominee William Sesler.

== Democratic primary ==
=== Candidates ===
- Frank Mesaros, Orthodox priest from Harrisburg
- Norval Reece, civil rights activist and senior aide to the Eugene McCarthy 1968 presidential campaign
- William Sesler, State Senator from Erie

== General election ==
=== Candidates ===
- Frank W. Gaydosh (Constitution)
- Herman A. Johnson (Socialist Labor)
- Robin Maisel (Socialist Workers)
- W. Henry McFarland (American Independent)
- William R. Mimms (Consumer)
- William Sesler, State Senator from Erie (Democratic)
- Hugh Scott, incumbent U.S. Senator (Republican)

=== Results ===
General election results
Party	Candidate	Votes	%	±%
Republican	Hugh Scott (Incumbent)	1,874,106	51.43%	+0.84%
Democratic	William Sesler	1,653,774	45.38%	−3.74%
Constitution	Frank W. Gaydosh	85,813	2.36%	+2.36%
American Independent	W. Henry McFarland	18,275	0.50%	+0.50%
Socialist Labor	Herman A. Johnson	4,375	0.12%	−0.02%
Socialist Workers	Robin Maisel	3,970	0.11%	−0.04%
Consumer	William R. Mimms	3,932	0.11%	+0.11%
N/A	Other	60	0.00%	N/A
Total votes		3,644,305	100.00%	
Republican hold				

== See also ==
- 1970 United States Senate elections
