= Terry L. Punt =

American politician (1949-2009)

Member of the Pennsylvania Senate from the 33rd district
- In office January 3, 1989 – November 30, 2008
- Preceded by: William J. Moore
- Succeeded by: Richard Alloway

Member of the Pennsylvania House of Representatives from the 90th district
- In office January 3, 1979 – November 30, 1988
- Preceded by: William O. Shuman
- Succeeded by: Patrick E. Fleagle

Personal details
- Born: August 13, 1949 Waynesboro, Pennsylvania
- Died: December 27, 2009 (aged 60) Waynesboro, Pennsylvania
- Party: Republican

Military service
- Allegiance: United States
- Branch/service: United States Army
- Years of service: 1967 — 1970

Terry L. Punt (August 13, 1949 – December 27, 2009) was a Republican member of the Pennsylvania State Senate, representing the 33rd District from 1989 to 2008. He also previously served as a member of the Pennsylvania House of Representatives from 1979 to 1988. He served in the United States Army from 1967 to 1970.
