= Patty Kim (politician) =

American politician

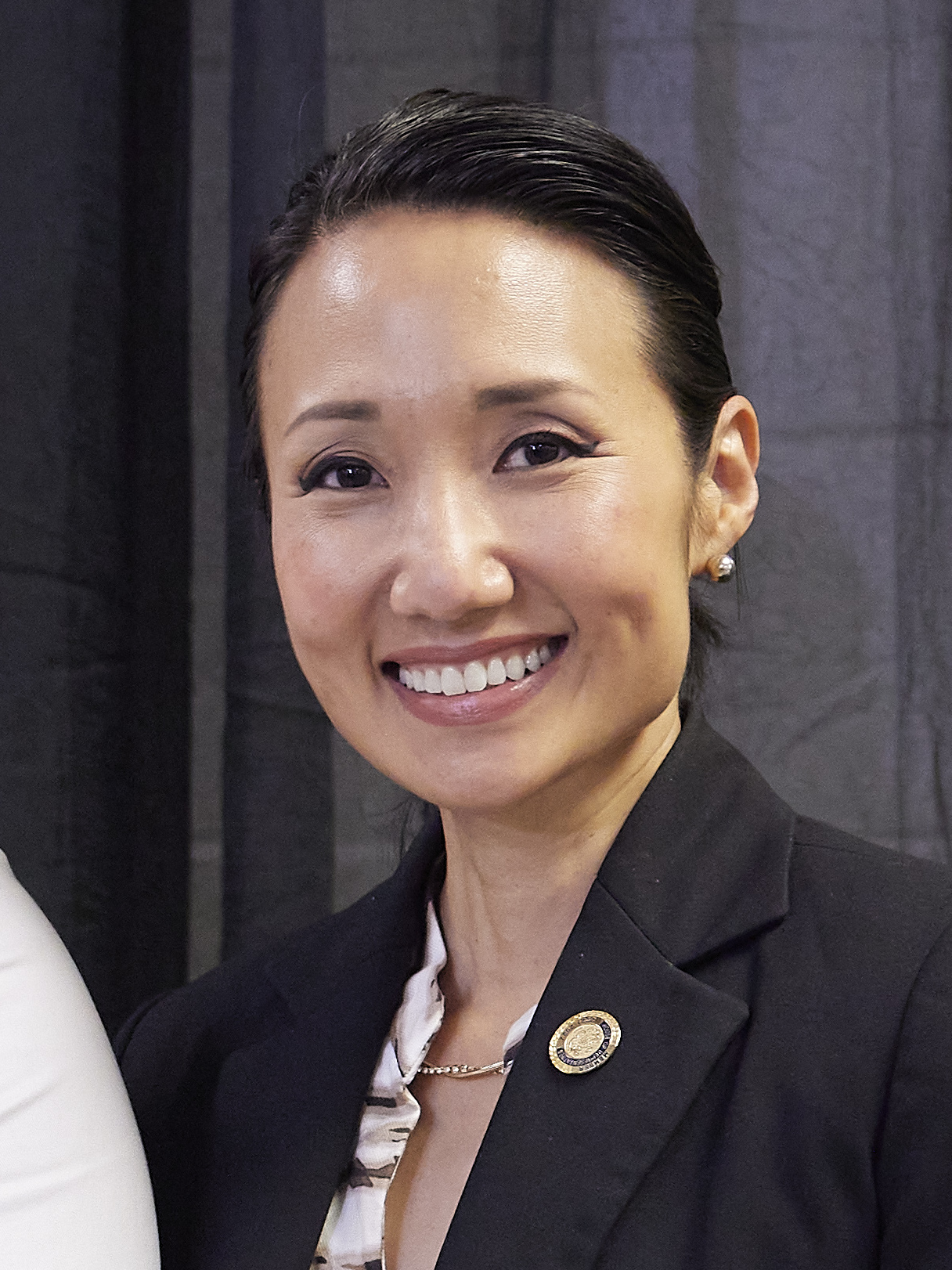
- Kim in 2022

Member of the Pennsylvania Senate from the 15th district
- Incumbent
- Assumed office January 7, 2025
- Preceded by: John DiSanto

Member of the Pennsylvania House of Representatives from the 103rd district
- In office January 1, 2013 – January 7, 2025
- Preceded by: Ron Buxton
- Succeeded by: Nate Davidson

Personal details
- Born: July 29, 1973 (age 53)
- Party: Democratic
- Spouse: John Sider
- Education: Boston College
- Profession: Legislator
- Website: Rep. Patty Kim

Patty H. Kim (born July 29, 1973) is an American politician. A Democrat, she is a member of the Pennsylvania State Senate. She was a member of the Pennsylvania House of Representatives representing the 103rd district, served from 2013 to 2025. She previously served on the Harrisburg, Pennsylvania City Council.

== Early life and education ==
Kim was born on July 29, 1973. Kim graduated from Langley High School in 1991 and Boston College in 1995. Kim's father immigrated from Korea after the Korean War.

== Television career ==
Prior to her career in elected office, Kim was a television reporter as well as a television production assistant; associate producer, and news anchor.

== Political career ==
=== Harrisburg City Council ===
Kim served on the Harrisburg City Council from 2006 to 2012, serving two terms. She served as vice president of the council.

=== Pennsylvania House of Representatives ===
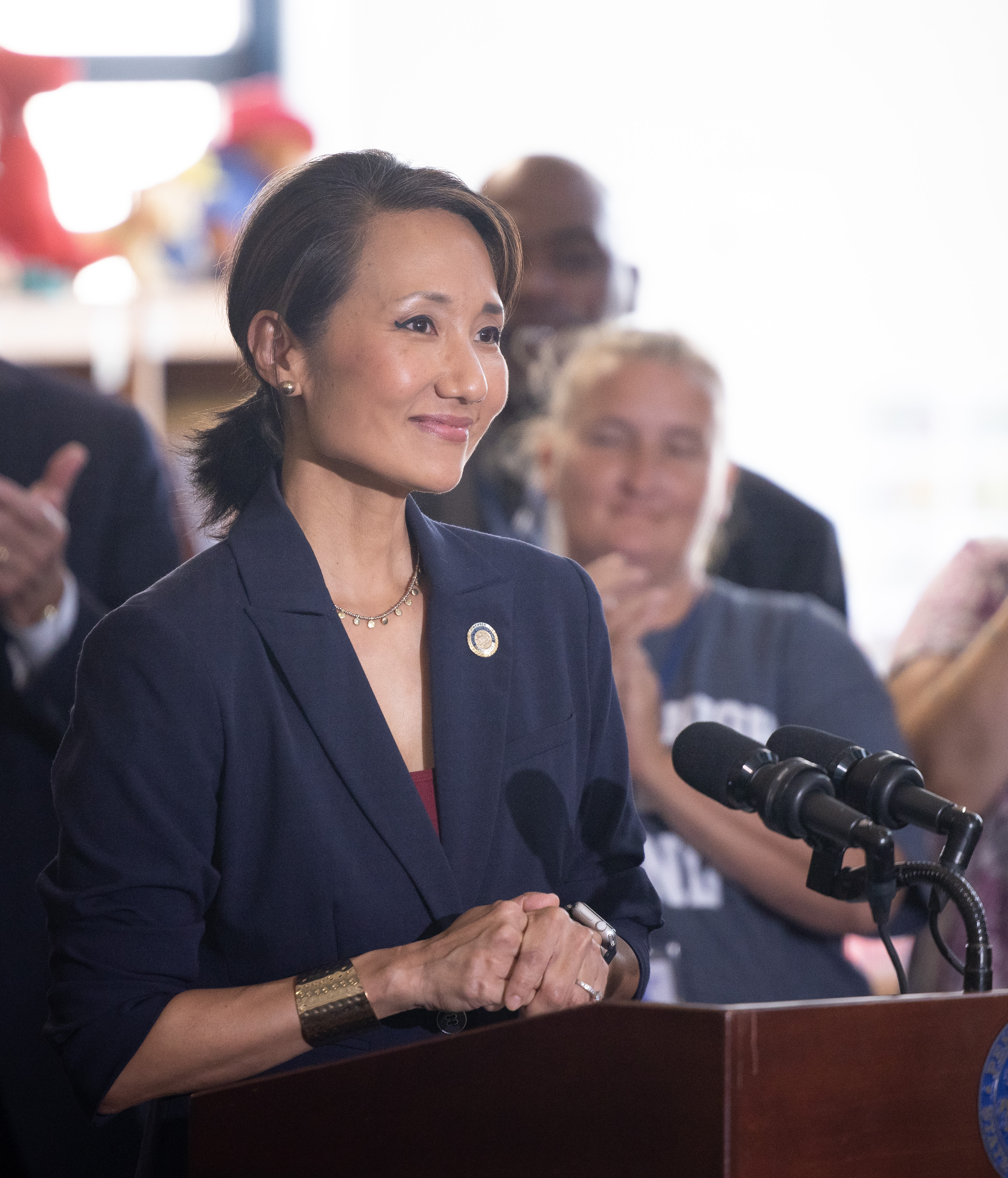
Kim speaking to the press during the announcement of universal free school breakfast, 2022.

==== Elections ====
In 2011, Kim announced that she would run for state House District 103 the next year, challenging incumbent Ron Buxton, a fellow Democrat, in the primary election. Buxton ultimately decided to not run for reelection. In the 2012 primary, Kim defeating Roy Christ, Karl Lewis Singleton, and Gloria E. Martin-Roberts, receiving 28.81% of the vote; Christ received 28.03%, Singleton 24.4%, and Martin-Roberts 18.76%. She ran unopposed in the general election.

In the 2014 election, Kim defeated Gina L. Roberson in the Democratic primary, receiving 78.42% of the vote to Roberson's 21.58%. Kim ran unopposed in the 2014 general election.

In 2016, Kim defeated opponent Richard Soto in the Democratic primary, receiving 89.41% of the vote to Soto's 10.58%. She ran unopposed in the 2016 general election.

In the 2018 election, Kim ran unopposed in the Democratic primary. In the November 2018 general election, Kim defeated Republican nominee Anthony Thomas Harrell, receiving 83.98% of the vote to Harrell's 16.02%.

In the 2020 election, Kim defeated opponent Kelvin Maxson in the Democratic primary, receiving 84.95% of the vote to Maxson's 15.05%. She ran unopposed in the 2020 general election.

In the 2022 election, Kim defeated opponent Heather MacDonald in the Democratic primary, receiving 87.37% of the vote to Macdonald's 12.63%. In the November 2022 general election, Kim defeated Republican nominee David D Buell, receiving 89.1% of the vote to Buell's 10.9%.

In the 2024 election, Kim defeated Republican Nick DiFrancisco to become the representative for Pennsylvania Senate District 15. She is only the second Democrat to represent this Harrisburg-based district since 1941, and only the third since 1875.

==== Tenure ====
Over several sessions in the state House, Kim was a leader in efforts to increase in Pennsylvania's state minimum wage from $7.25 an hour to $15 an hour. Kim also sponsored legislation that would expunge the criminal records of persons convicted of non-violent crimes who do not commit another crime for at least seven years.

Kim, who is Korean American, is the first Asian-American to serve in the Pennsylvania House of Representatives.

In 2015, Kim recruited six other House Democrats from inner-city districts across the state to go to block parties to reach out to voters to increase awareness for more education spending in state budget.

In 2019, Kim supported calls by Harrisburg Mayor Eric Papenfuse for a state-appointed receiver to assume control of the long-troubled Harrisburg School District, which has been plagued by financial mismanagement, poor academic performance, and high employee turnover.

In 2019, Kim was the sole Democrat in the state House to support a pension reform proposal that would switch a traditional pension plan for state workers to a 401(k)-style plan.

Kim currently sits on the Appropriations, Education, Finance, Insurance, and Local Government committees.

On October 19, 2023, Kim announced her campaign for Pennsylvania's 15th State Senate district, held by Republican John DiSanto. Kim also announced she would not seek reelection to the Pennsylvania House of Representatives.

=== Pennsylvania Senate ===
Kim was sworn into the Pennsylvania State Senate in 2025, following Senator John DiSanto's decision not run for re-election.

For the 2025-2025 Session Kim sits on the following committees in the State Senate:

- Local Government (Minority Chair)
- Aging & Youth
- Appropriations
- Banking & Insurance
- Community, Economic & Recreational Development

== Personal life ==
Kim is married to John Sider; they have two children.

Kim is a major supporter and sponsor of the Tri-Community Basketball Association.
