= Pennsylvania's 49th Senate district =

American legislative district

Pennsylvania's 49th State Senate district
Senator
Dan Laughlin; R–Millcreek Township, Erie County
- Population (2021): 261,100

Pennsylvania State Senate District 49 includes part of Erie County. It is currently represented by Republican Dan Laughlin.

== District profile ==
The district includes the following areas:

Erie County:

- Albion
- Amity Township
- Conneaut Township
- Cranesville
- Edinboro
- Elk Creek Township
- Erie
- Fairview Township
- Franklin Township
- Girard
- Girard Township
- Greene Township
- Greenfield Township
- Harborcreek Township
- Lake City
- Lawrence Park Township
- LeBoeuf Township
- McKean
- McKean Township
- Mill Village
- Millcreek Township
- North East
- North East Township
- Platea
- Springfield Township
- Summit Township
- Union City
- Union Township
- Venango Township
- Washington Township
- Waterford
- Waterford Township
- Wattsburg
- Wesleyville

== Senators ==
Representative	Party	Years	District home	Note	Counties
William G. Sesler	Democratic	1961–1972			Erie
Quentin R. Orlando	Democratic	1973–1980			Erie (part)
Anthony Andrezeski	Democratic	1981–1996			Erie (part)
Jane Earll	Republican	1997–2012			Erie (part)
Sean D. Wiley	Democratic	2013–2016			Erie (part)
Dan Laughlin	Republican	2017–present			Erie (part)

== Recent election results ==
PA Senate election, 2020
Party	Candidate	Votes	%
Republican	Dan Laughlin (incumbent)	69,813	59.8
Democratic	Julie Slomski	46,900	40.2
Total votes		116,713	100.0
Republican hold			

PA Senate election, 2016
Party	Candidate	Votes	%
Republican	Dan Laughlin	57,790	53.4
Democratic	Sean Wiley (incumbent)	50,356	46.6
Total votes		108,146	100.0
Republican gain from Democratic			

PA Senate election, 2012
Party	Candidate	Votes	%
Democratic	Sean Wiley	60,921	60.0
Republican	Janet Anderson	40,592	40.0
Total votes		101,513	100.0
Democratic gain from Republican			

PA Senate election, 2008
Party	Candidate	Votes	%
Republican	Jane Earll (incumbent)	61,134	58.1
Democratic	Cindy Purvis	44,173	41.9
Total votes		105,307	100.0
Republican hold			
