= Joe Scarnati =

American politician (born 1962)

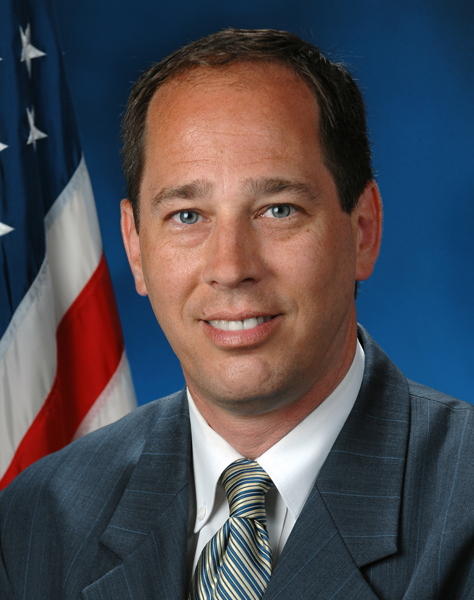

President pro tempore of the Pennsylvania Senate
- In office January 2, 2007 – November 10, 2020
- Preceded by: Robert Jubelirer
- Succeeded by: Jake Corman

31st Lieutenant Governor of Pennsylvania
- In office December 3, 2008 – January 18, 2011
- Governor: Ed Rendell
- Preceded by: Catherine Baker Knoll
- Succeeded by: Jim Cawley

Member of the Pennsylvania Senate from the 25th district
- In office January 2, 2001 – November 30, 2020
- Preceded by: Bill Slocum
- Succeeded by: Cris Dush

Personal details
- Born: January 2, 1962 (age 64) Brockway, Pennsylvania, U.S.
- Party: Republican
- Children: 5
- Education: Pennsylvania State University, DuBois
- Website: Official website

Joseph B. Scarnati III (born January 2, 1962) is an American politician from the U.S. State of Pennsylvania. A member of the Republican Party, he served in the Pennsylvania State Senate as the member from the 25th District from 2001 to 2020, and was the president pro tempore from 2007 to 2020.

As President pro tempore, he became the 31st lieutenant governor of Pennsylvania following the death of Catherine Baker Knoll on November 12, 2008. He was sworn in on December 3, 2008. He did not seek election to the post in 2010, and was succeeded as Lieutenant Governor by Jim Cawley.

== Early life, education, and early political career ==
Scarnati was born and raised in Brockway, Pennsylvania, a borough located in Jefferson County. He graduated from Penn State DuBois with an A.A. in Business Administration in 1982.

Prior to his senate election, Scarnati served on both the Brockway Borough Council (1986–1994) and the Jefferson County Development Council.

== Pennsylvania Senate ==
=== Elections ===
In 1996, Scarnati first ran for Pennsylvania's 25th senate district when incumbent Republican State Senator John E. Peterson decided to retire in order to run for congress. Scarnati lost the Republican primary to Bill Slocum by 351 votes. Slocum won the primary with a plurality of 32% of the vote in the four candidate field.

In 2000, Slocum was convicted of illegal dumping and resigned. Scarnati ran for the seat as an independent against Slocum, who was attempting a comeback in the special election to replace him. Scarnati won the election with 33% of the vote, defeating Democratic nominee Joseph J. Calla (33%) and Republican nominee Bill Slocum (32%). He edged Calla by just 197 votes. After the election, he switched back to the Republican party.

In 2004, Scarnati ran for re-election with no Democratic opposition in his first re-election campaign. He defeated Constitution Party nominee Alan R. Kiser 90%–10%. In 2008, he won re-election to a third term, defeating Democrat Donald L. Hilliard 67%–33%. In 2012, he won re-election to a fourth term unopposed.

=== Role in Pennsylvania sexual assault legislation ===
As the Senate President Pro Tempore, Scarnati blocked attempts to reform the state's statute of limitations for child sexual assault. Some of Scarnati's former staff and the wife of Drew Crompton, his prior chief of staff, worked at Long, Nyquist and Associates, a Harrisburg lobbying firm of whom the Pennsylvania Catholic Conference, the church's statewide public policy arm, is a client. As of 2019, the Catholic Church had spent over $5 million toward lobbying in Pennsylvania to keep current restrictions in place as to when sexual abuse victims can file charges against their abusers.

Scarnati became involved in a federal probe when he, along with Long Nyquist & Associates, accepted money from a fake firm run by the FBI. Scarnati received $5,000 from an undercover agent in June 2010 and picked up a $17,500 contribution from Long Nyquist's political action committee. Both Long and Nyquist are former senior aides for senate Republican leaders with strong ties to Scarnati. While the probe caught others who were accused of agreeing to official action in exchange for money, neither Scarnati nor Long Nyquist were charged with doing so.

In early 2019, Scarnatti's office agreed to the Senate's paying over $23,000 in legal expenses for a former employee accused of sexual misconduct, according to documents acquired via a public records request. The employee had resigned in late 2017 among allegations that he sexually harassed two female subordinates, including texting them photos of feces and male genitals.

Charles Kaza, priest of the St. Tobias Parish in Scarnati's hometown of Brockway, was removed in May 2019 over sexual abuse allegations. Kaza was reinstated a year later after the allegations could not be substantiated.

=== Tenure ===
In May 2006, Robert Jubelirer and David Brightbill, the Republicans' two top leaders were defeated in the primary election, victims of the legislative pay raise fallout. Scarnati narrowly won the race to replace Jubelirer against veteran lawmakers Stewart Greenleaf and Jeffrey Piccola.

Upon the death of Lieutenant Governor Catherine Baker Knoll on November 12, 2008, Scarnati assumed the position of Lieutenant Governor of Pennsylvania. He served as acting Lieutenant Governor until he was sworn into office on Wednesday, December 3, 2008. He did not seek election to the post in 2010, and was succeeded as Lieutenant Governor by Jim Cawley.

Scarnati played a lead role in representing Republicans during Pennsylvania's 2009 budget impasse, and harshly criticized Governor Rendell's leadership style and priorities. He was seen as "the de facto opposition leader to Rendell".

On election night of 2020, Scarnati was one of two state senators who called for the resignation of Pennsylvania Secretary of State Kathy Boockvar, whom they said had "fundamentally altered" the state's election conduct by allowing county boards to give voters an opportunity to re-do their ballots if they were rejected.

=== Weather and climate denial ===
When Chris Abruzzo was nominated to become secretary of the Pennsylvania Department of Environmental Protection in December 2013, and came under criticism for testifying that he was unaware of evidence that global warming was harmful to the environment, Scarnati defended Abruzzo, saying "We should not be deemed unfit to serve simply because we may not agree entirely with the strongly held view of some in this chamber and elsewhere. As a matter of fact, anyone who has ventured outdoors the past few days may very well have good reason to disagree with that point of view." It had been snowing in Harrisburg, off and on, for the previous two days. Scarnati was criticized by state senator Daylin Leach for equating weather with climate. Abruzzo's and Scarnati's position is entirely contradicted by the overwhelming scientific consensus on climate change, which holds that climate change is real, harmful, and primarily human-caused. Abruzzo was confirmed in a 42–8 vote.

=== Gerrymandering ===
On January 22, 2018, the Supreme Court of Pennsylvania, divided along partisan lines, invalidated the state's congressional map, on the grounds that Pennsylvania's Republican-dominated legislature had engaged in partisan gerrymandering that "clearly, plainly and palpably" violated the Pennsylvania Constitution. A week later, Scarnati formally declared his intent not to turn over any data requested by the Court's orders, maintaining a position Republicans petitioned to the U.S. Supreme Court, that the state's constitution delegates the role of congressional districting to the General Assembly. On February 5, 2018, U.S. Supreme Court Justice Samuel Alito rejected the Pennsylvania Republicans' request for a stay and review of the state court's ruling. The top federal court's order was expected by many, as the state supreme court is the highest authority on matters based exclusively on the state constitution.

== Personal life ==
Scarnati grew up in an Italian-American family in Brockway, Pennsylvania. He began his political career on the Brockway Borough Council in 1986. He helped run the family's restaurant and became the chairman of the Jefferson County Republican Party. Scarnati resides in Warren, Pennsylvania with his wife Amy. They have five children.

== See also ==
- Drew Crompton
- List of Pennsylvania state legislatures

Pennsylvania State Senate
Preceded by Bill Slocum	Member of the Pennsylvania Senate from the 25th district 2001–2020	Succeeded by Cris Dush
Preceded by Robert Jubelirer	President pro tempore of the Pennsylvania Senate; 2007–2020	Succeeded by Jake Corman
Political offices
Preceded by Catherine Baker Knoll	Lieutenant Governor of Pennsylvania; 2008–2011	Succeeded by Jim Cawley
