= John DiSanto =

American politician from Pennsylvania

Member of the Pennsylvania Senate from the 15th district
- In office January 3, 2017 – November 30, 2024
- Preceded by: Rob Teplitz
- Succeeded by: Patty Kim

Personal details
- Party: Republican
- Spouse: Maria DiSanto
- Children: 2
- Education: American University

Giovanni M. "John" DiSanto is an American politician from Pennsylvania who served as a Republican member of the Pennsylvania State Senate for the 15th district from 2017 to 2024.

== Early life and education ==
DiSanto was born in Harrisburg area and graduated from Central Dauphin High School. He received a bachelor's degree in business administration with an emphasis in Urban Planning from American University.

== Career ==
Before his election to the State Senate in 2016, DiSanto was president of a construction and development company. He defeated Rob Teplitz in a heated contest for the 15th district.

=== Committee assignments ===
- Banking & Insurance, Chair
- Urban Affairs & Housing, Vice Chair
- Education
- Labor & Industry
- Transportation

== Position on Medical Cannabis ==
In the 2020–2021 session, DiSanto opposed an amendment to House Bill 1024 that would have allowed medical patients to grow six cannabis plants at home. However, DiSanto did vote for House Bill 1024 without the home grow amendment, which allowed medical marijuana growers in Pennsylvania to remediate moldy product and use additional pesticides.

In 2022, DiSanto sponsored and introduced Senate Bill 1167, a bill to permit marijuana companies and associated insurance companies to access banking services without criminal liability. Senate Bill 1167 did not include any protections or additional rights for medical marijuana patients in Pennsylvania.

After voting against homegrown rights for medical cannabis patients and sponsoring Senate Bill 1167, on June 26, 2023, Disanto taunted two cannabis activists on Twitter, posting a picture of himself wearing a shirt stating "I Just Had a Joint (Replacement Surgery)".

== Controversies ==
On October 8, 2023, Disanto tweeted about an Apple iPhone commercial starring Olivia Rodrigo: "Young girl, filming with phone, dressed suggestively, keying a car, trashing a room and so on. Pathetic promoting this is how a young women should act." Disanto faced backlash for this statement by the public, with some calling him a "pathetic creep.". Disanto was also called "cringe" and a "weirdo" for his post, which he did not comment on further.
