= Andy Dinniman =

American politician (born 1944)

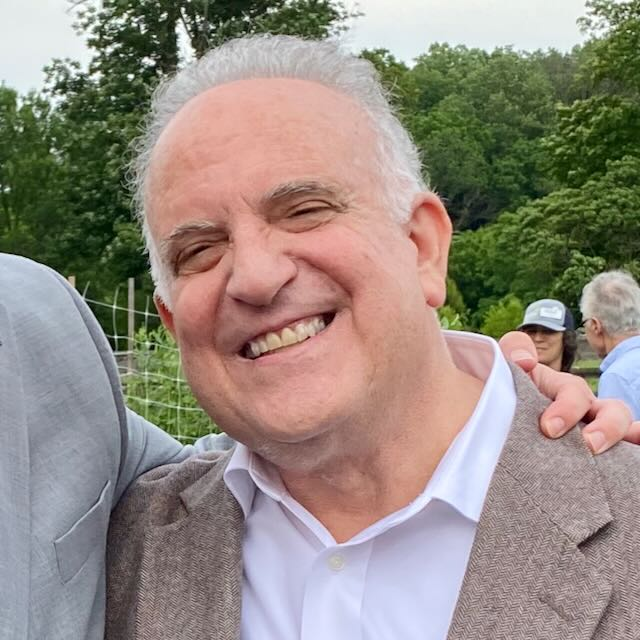
- Andy Dinniman in 2021.

Member of the Pennsylvania Senate from the 19th district
- In office June 19, 2006 – November 30, 2020
- Preceded by: Bob Thompson
- Succeeded by: Carolyn Comitta

Member of the Chester County Board of Commissioners
- In office January 7, 1992 – June 19, 2006
- Preceded by: Patricia Moran Baldwin
- Succeeded by: Kathi Cozzone

Member of the Downingtown Area School Board
- In office December 1, 1975 – December 3, 1979

Personal details
- Born: October 10, 1944 (age 81)
- Party: Democratic
- Spouse: Margo
- Education: University of Connecticut; University of Maryland; Pennsylvania State University
- Profession: University Professor
- Website: senatordinniman.com

Andrew E. Dinniman (born October 10, 1944) is an American politician who served as a Democratic member of the Pennsylvania State Senate for the 19th District from June 2006 until 2020.

== Early life and education ==
Dinniman was born in New Haven, Connecticut. He received his BA from the University of Connecticut in 1966, and his MA from the University of Maryland in 1969. He also holds an Ed.D. from Pennsylvania State University.

== Teaching career ==
Dinniman Taught at Prince George Community College and West Chester University.

== Early political career ==
Dinniman's first elected position was as a member of Downingtown school district's board of school directors. He was first elected to this position in 1975, and held the post until 1979. In 1979, Dinniman was elected chairman of the Chester County Democratic Committee, a position he held until 1985.

== County Commissioner ==
Dinniman later served as Chester County commissioner for three terms, beginning in 1991. During his three terms as commissioner, Dinniman was the body's only Democrat.

== Pennsylvania State Senate ==
=== 2006 special election ===
After the death of Republican Senator Robert "Bob" Thompson in 2006, Dinniman sought and attained his party's nomination to run in the ensuing special election. The special election pit Dinniman against his fellow county commissioner, Republican Carol Aichele. In what was considered a political surprise, Dinniman won with 56% of the vote, becoming the first Democrat elected to represent Chester County in the state Senate since the 1920s.

Pennsylvania Senate, District 19: May 2006 Special Election
Party	Candidate	Votes	%
Democratic	Andy Dinniman	21,614	56.2
Republican	Carol Aichele	16,822	43.8
Total votes		38,436	100.0
Democratic gain from Republican			

=== 2008 election ===
Dinniman faced re-election in 2008. He handily defeated Republican Steve Kantrowitz, a retired U.S. Navy Admiral, with 57.8% of the vote.

Pennsylvania Senate, District 19: November 2008 General Election
Party	Candidate	Votes	%
Democratic	Andy Dinniman (incumbent)	84,846	57.8
Republican	Steve Kantrowitz	62,026	42.2
Total votes		146,872	100.0
Democratic hold			

=== 2012 election ===
Dinniman faced re-election in 2012. He handily defeated Chris Amentas, an East Fallowfield Township supervisor, with 57.45% of the vote.

Pennsylvania Senate, District 19: November 2012 General Election
Party	Candidate	Votes	%
Democratic	Andy Dinniman (incumbent)	83,589	57.45
Republican	Chris Amentas	61,914	42.55
Total votes		145,503	100.00
Democratic hold			

=== 2016 election ===
Dinniman faced re-election again in 2016 against Republican Jack London. He handily won with 56.33% of the vote.

Pennsylvania Senate, District 19: November 2016 General Election
Party	Candidate	Votes	%
Democratic	Andy Dinniman (incumbent)	75,615	56.4
Republican	Jack London	58,456	43.6
Total votes		134,071	100.0
Democratic hold			

=== Committee assignments ===
At the time of his retirement, Dinniman sat on five committees: Education; Communications and Technology; Agriculture and Rural Affairs; Environmental Resources and Energy; and State Government. He was the ranking Democrat on the Senate's education committee.

=== Retirement ===
After initially preparing for a re-election campaign, Dinniman announced he would not seek another term and retire at the end of 2020. He was succeeded by Carolyn Comitta.

== Potential congressional candidacy ==
In 2009, the non-partisan political newspaper The Hill reported that Dinniman was "reportedly eyeing a run" for the Democratic nomination in the congressional seat being vacated by Republican Jim Gerlach, who was, at the time, running for governor. Dinniman, however, ultimately did not enter the race. He endorsed Manan Trivedi, a doctor from Reading, who went on to win the Democratic primary, but lost the fall general election to Gerlach.

Pennsylvania State Senate
Preceded by Bob Thompson	Member of the Pennsylvania Senate from the 19th district 2006–2020	Succeeded by Carolyn Comitta
Political offices
Preceded by Patricia Moran Baldwin	Member of the Chester County Board of Commissioners; 1992–2006	Succeeded by Kathi Cozzone
