= Jane Earll =

American politician

Jane M. Earll
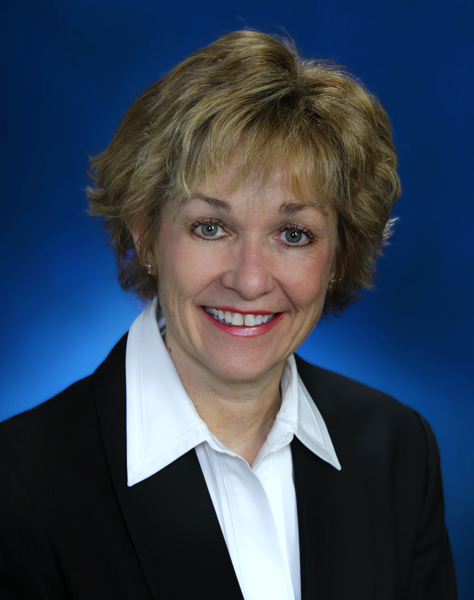

Member of the Pennsylvania Senate from the 49th district
- In office January 7, 1997 – November 30, 2012
- Preceded by: Anthony Andrezeski
- Succeeded by: Sean Wiley

Personal details
- Born: August 10, 1958 (age 68) Erie, Pennsylvania, U.S.
- Party: Republican
- Spouse: Jack Daneri
- Education: Allegheny College; Ohio Northern University Pettit College of Law

Jane M. Earll (born August 10, 1958) is an American attorney, politician and former Republican member of the Pennsylvania State Senate who represented the 49th District from 1997 to 2013.

== Early career and personal life ==
Earll served as Assistant District Attorney for Erie County, Pennsylvania and as an attorney for Richards and Associates. She is married to Erie County District Attorney Jack Daneri.

=== Pennsylvania Senate ===
While in the Senate, Earll served as Chair of the Community, Economic & Recreational Committee, Vice Chair of the Finance Committee, and a member of the Banking & Insurance, Judiciary, Rules & Executive Nominations, and Transportation Committees.

In 2002, she was named to the PoliticsPA list of Best Dressed Legislators.

== Election Campaigns ==
Earll won election to the Senate against Democrat Buzz Andrezewski a year after losing a countywide race for District Attorney, and in re-election bids she faced down Democrats John Paul Jones, Tony Logue, and Cindy Purvis.

She was the Republican party's nominee for Lieutenant Governor on a ticket with Mike Fisher in 2002. The Pennsylvania Report described her as "an outstanding candidate for Lieutenant Governor" and said that she was "[w]ell-liked and respected on both sides of the aisle." She and Fisher lost the election to Ed Rendell and Catherine Baker Knoll.

Pennsylvania State Senate
Preceded by Anthony Andrezeski	Member of the Pennsylvania Senate for the 49th District; 1997-2012	Succeeded by Sean Wiley
Party political offices
Preceded by Mark Schweiker	Republican nominee for Lieutenant Governor of Pennsylvania; 2002	Succeeded by Jim Matthews
