= Sean Wiley =

American politician

Sean D. Wiley

Member of the Pennsylvania Senate from the 49th district
- In office January 1, 2013 – November 30, 2016
- Preceded by: Jane Earll
- Succeeded by: Dan Laughlin

Personal details
- Born: March 16, 1971 (age 55) Erie, Pennsylvania
- Party: Democratic
- Children: Nathan, Kamryn, Parker
- Education: DeVry University
- Profession: State Senator
- Website: www.senatorwiley.com

Sean David Wiley (born March 16, 1971) is a Pennsylvania Democratic politician who served as the State Senator for the 49th district from 2013 to 2016.

== Early life and education 1971-2012 ==
Wiley was born in Erie, Pennsylvania, on March 16, 1971. During his childhood he lived on the west side of Erie and attended Our Lady's Christian School. He attended Fairview High School and graduated in 1989. He continued his studies at a for-profit college DeVry University in Columbus, Ohio, and achieved a bachelor's degree in business operations, graduating in 1993.

He returned to Erie to begin his professional career in the building material industry and capped a thirteen-year career in 2006 when he transitioned to serve as the director of administration of Erie County. He joined the Saint Vincent Health System in September 2009 in the position of the director of the Saint Vincent Foundation and government affairs.

== Election and senate career 2012-2016 ==
Wiley first ran for office in the 2012 election for Pennsylvania Senate District 49. Wiley won the 4-way Democratic primary on April 24 defeating John Harkins, Brian Pitzer, and Terry Scutella. In the general election, which took place on November 6, 2012, he defeated Janet Anderson (R) obtaining 60% of the votes. The incumbent Jane Earll (R) did not seek re-election.
He assumed office on January 1, 2013. On November 8, 2016, Wiley was defeated for re-election by Dan Laughlin.

=== Legislation ===
Wiley has worked on legislation for Comprehensive Gaming Legislation, Microplastic Ban, with Senator Alloway and Senator Yaw, Resolution 36(Poison Prevention Week), Senate Bill 115(Establishing the Pay for Success Program), Senate Bill 118 (Competitive Bidding for Cyber Education), Senate Bill 129 (County Pension Law), Senate Bill 299 (Municipal Tax Credit for Volunteer First Responders)with Senator Baker, Senate Bill 382 CRIZ expansion and Senate Bill 604 Broader Allocation of the Lake Erie Permit Revenue, with Senator Alloway.

=== Committee assignments ===
He was the minority chairman of the Intergovernmental Operations Committee for his entire Senate term.

He also served on the Community, Economic and Recreational Development, Aging and Youth, Appropriations, Game and Fisheries, Intergovernmental Operations and the Banking and Insurance Committee. Like all Democratic senators, he served on the Policy committees.

=== Caucus membership ===
Wiley participated in the Arts & Culture Caucus, LGBT Equality Caucus, Public Media Caucus, Manufacturing Caucus

=== Other boards, committees and affiliations ===
Wiley's past and present involvement also includes:

- Legislative Air & Water Pollution Control & Conservation Committee (2015–2016)
- Pennsylvania Hardwoods Development Council (2015–2016)
- Pennsylvania Tourism Partnership (2015–2016)
- PennSERVE (2014–2016)
- PHEAA Board (2014–2016)
- Sisters of St. Joseph (present)
- Sons of Lake Erie (present)
- Youth Leadership Institute of Erie (leadership dev. instructor) (2010-2012)
- Erie County Industrial Development Authority (board member) (2009-2012)
- Erie County Economic Development Committee (2009-2012)
- Leadership Erie (graduate) (2010)
- The Allied Pediatric Health Steering Committee (2009-2012)
- United Way Campaign Cabinet (2011)
- Northwest Pennsylvania Workforce Investment Board (2009-2010)
- Cursillo Movement #195 (graduate) (2007)
- The Bradley H. Foulk Children's Advocacy Center (president of board ’09-’11) (2006-2011)
- The Junior Achievement (board member) (2006-2009)
- The Boys and Girls Club of America (board member) (2006-2009)
- Erie County Jail Overcrowding Committee (2006-2009)
- Erie County Diabetes Association (2006-2009)
- Erie County Records Improvement Committee (2006-2009)
- Erie County Criminal Justice Coalition (2006-2009)
