= Wayne Langerholc =

American politician from Pennsylvania

Wayne Langerholc Jr.

Member of the Pennsylvania Senate from the 35th district
- Incumbent
- Assumed office January 3, 2017
- Preceded by: John N. Wozniak

Personal details
- Party: Republican
- Spouse: Cortney Langerholc
- Children: 3
- Education: Juniata College; Widener School of Law
- Alma mater: Juniata College; Widener School of Law

Wayne Langerholc Jr. is a Pennsylvania attorney, former prosecutor, and politician. A Republican, he is a senator representing District 35 in the Pennsylvania Senate. Before his election to the state senate in 2016, Langerholc was an assistant district attorney in Cambria County and a township supervisor. He attended Widener University Commonwealth Law School in Harrisburg, PA.

Langerholc initially expected to face five-term Democratic incumbent John N. Wozniak, but Wozniak retired just three months before the election. Wozniak was replaced on the ballot by Cambria County controller Ed Cernic Jr. Langerholc benefited from Donald Trump winning the district with 71 percent of the vote, which was Trump's second-best showing in the state.

== State Senate ==
For the 2025-2026 Session Langerholc serves as the Majority Whip and sits on the following committees on the State Senate:

- Aging & Youth (Chair)
- Rules & Executive Nominations (Vice Chair)
- Appropriations
- Judiciary
- Transportation
- Veterans Affairs & Emergency Preparedness
