= Richard Alloway =

American politician

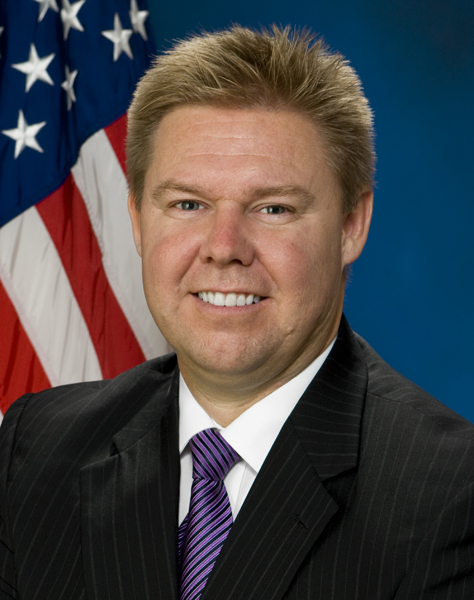

Member of the Pennsylvania Senate from the 33rd district
- In office January 6, 2009 – February 28, 2019
- Preceded by: Terry Punt
- Succeeded by: Doug Mastriano

Personal details
- Party: Republican
- Education: Shippensburg University (BA); Widener University (JD)
- Occupation: Lawyer
- Website: Pennsylvania State Senator Richard Alloway

Richard Alloway II is an American politician and lawyer. He is a former Republican member of the Pennsylvania State Senate. He was elected to fill the seat of retiring senator Terry Punt.

== Early life and career ==
Alloway attended Chambersburg Area Senior High School and graduated in the class of 1986 before attending Shippensburg University and then Widener University Commonwealth Law School He served as a magisterial district judge and on the staff of his predecessor, Terry Punt. Alloway was a member of Downtown Chambersburg, Inc., and was the President of the Greene and Lurgan Township Lions Clubs.

== Political career ==
Alloway was first elected in 2008 to serve as the State Senator for the 33rd District, and was subsequently re-elected in 2012 and 2016. Alloway became the Republican Caucus secretary in 2014, and was chosen again for the position in 2016 and 2018.

In the Senate, Alloway served as the chair of the Game and Fisheries Committee, and was a well-known supporter of gun rights and for advocating for protecting animals from abuse. Alloway introduced "Libre's Law," a bill that expanded protections for animals, namely dogs and horses, and granted civil immunity to those who report animal abuse "in good faith" to shield them from frivolous lawsuits. The bill, which received bipartisan support, was signed into law by Governor Tom Wolf in June 2017.

In January 2019, Alloway abruptly announced that he planned on resigning from the Senate, saying that he would like to return to private practice or consider becoming a lobbyist. Lieutenant Governor John Fetterman scheduled the special election to fulfill the remainder of his term on May 21, coinciding with the 2019 municipal primary election.

== Electoral history ==
Pennsylvania State Senate, District 33 General Election, 2008
Party	Candidate	Votes	%
Republican	Rich Alloway II	80,259	68.56
Democratic	Bruce Tushingham	36,804	31.44
Total votes		117,063	100.00
Republican hold			

Pennsylvania State Senate, District 33 General Election, 2012
Party	Candidate	Votes	%
Republican	Rich Alloway II	81,503	70.74
Democratic	Bruce Neylon	33,716	29.26
Total votes		115,219	100.00
Republican hold			

Pennsylvania State Senate, District 33 General Election, 2016
Party	Candidate	Votes	%
Republican	Rich Alloway II	Unopposed	
Total votes		99,377	100.00
Republican hold			
