= Elder Vogel =

American politician

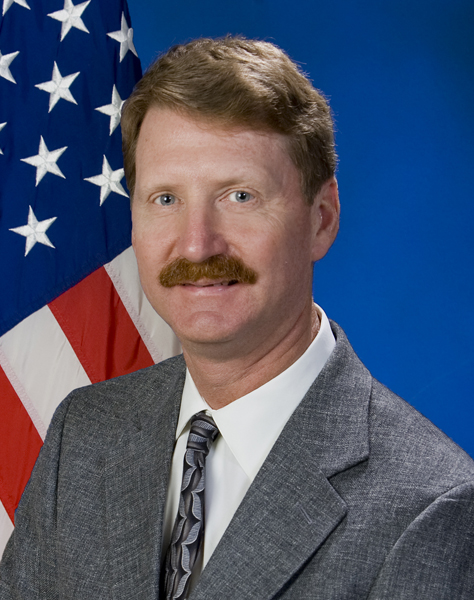

Member of the Pennsylvania Senate from the 47th district
- Incumbent
- Assumed office January 6, 2009
- Preceded by: Gerald LaValle

Personal details
- Born: July 9, 1956 (age 70) Rochester, Pennsylvania, U.S.
- Party: Republican
- Occupation: Dairy Farmer
- Website: Pennsylvania State Senator Elder Vogel

Elder Vogel Jr. (born July 9, 1956) is an American politician and Republican member of the Pennsylvania State Senate. He has represented the 47th district since 2009.

== Professional career ==
Vogel is a fourth generation dairy farmer who operates his family's farm in New Sewickley Township.

== Political career ==
Prior to joining the Senate, Vogel served as a New Sewickley Township supervisor.

On November 4, 2008, he was elected to the State Senate, succeeding retiring Democrat Gerald LaValle. Vogel defeated his opponent, Jason Petrella, by a margin of 56.8% to 43.2%. His original opponent, State Representative Sean Ramaley, dropped out of the race due to alleged involvement in the bonusgate scandal.

For the 2025-2026 Session, Vogel sits on the following committees in the State Senate:

- Agricultural & Rural Affairs (Chair)
- Appropriations (Vice Chair)
- Banking & Insurance
- Environmental Resources & Energy
- Transportation
- Urban Affairs & Housing

Pennsylvania State Senate
Preceded by Gerald LaValle	Member of the Pennsylvania Senate for the 47th District; 2009–present	Succeeded by Incumbent
