= Pennsylvania's 47th Senate district =

American legislative district

Pennsylvania's 47th State Senate district
Senator
Elder Vogel; R–New Sewickley Township
- Population (2021): 256,105

Pennsylvania State Senate District 47 includes parts of Beaver County, Butler County, and Lawrence County. It is currently represented by Republican Elder Vogel.

== District profile ==
The district includes the following areas:

Beaver County:

- Aliquippa
- Ambridge
- Baden
- Beaver
- Beaver Falls
- Big Beaver
- Bridgewater
- Brighton Township
- Center Township
- Chippewa Township
- Conway
- Darlington
- Darlington Township
- Daugherty Township
- East Rochester
- Eastvale
- Economy
- Ellwood City (Beaver County portion)
- Fallston
- Franklin Township
- Freedom
- Georgetown
- Glasgow
- Greene Township
- Harmony Township
- Homewood
- Hookstown
- Hopewell Township
- Industry
- Koppel
- Marion Township
- Midland
- Monaca
- New Brighton
- New Galilee
- New Sewickley Township
- North Sewickley Township
- Ohioville
- Patterson Heights
- Patterson Township
- Potter Township
- Pulaski Township
- Raccoon Township
- Rochester
- Rochester Township
- Shippingport
- South Beaver Township
- South Heights
- Vanport Township
- West Mayfield
- White Township

Butler County:

- Adams Township
- Callery
- Cranberry Township
- Evans City
- Forward Township
- Harmony
- Jackson Township
- Lancaster Township
- Mars
- Middlesex Township
- Seven Fields
- Valencia
- Zelienople

Lawrence County:

- Ellport
- Ellwood City (Lawrence County portion)
- Enon Valley
- Little Beaver Township
- New Beaver
- Perry Township
- Wampum
- Wayne Township

== Senators ==
Representative	Party	Years	District home	Note
Ernest P. Kline	Democratic	1965 – 1971		Resigned January 5, 1971.
John G. Good, Jr.	Republican	1971 – 1972		Seated June 21, 1971 to fill vacancy.
James E. Ross	Democratic	1973 – 1990		Resigned February 28, 1990.
Gerald J. LaValle	Democratic	1990 – 2008		Seated June 4, 1990.
Elder Vogel, Jr.	Republican	2009 – present		
