= Eugene Yaw =

American politician

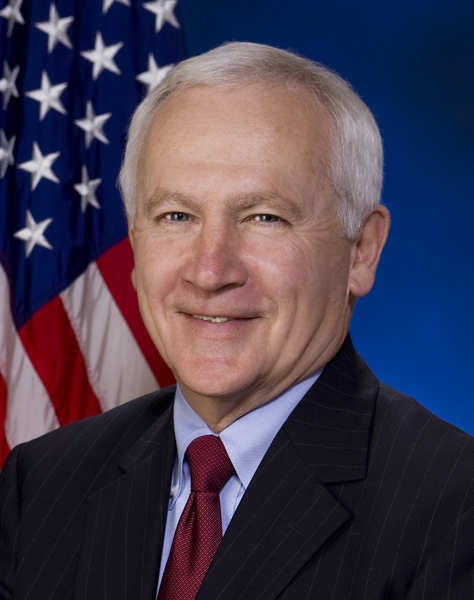

Member of the Pennsylvania Senate from the 23rd district
- Incumbent
- Assumed office January 6, 2009
- Preceded by: Roger Madigan

Personal details
- Born: Emerson Eugene Yaw; February 26, 1943 (age 83) Montoursville, Pennsylvania
- Party: Republican
- Education: Lycoming College; American University (JD)
- Website: Campaign website

E. Eugene Yaw (born February 26, 1943) is an American politician from Pennsylvania currently serving as a Republican member of the Pennsylvania State Senate for the 23rd district since 2009.

== Early life and education ==
Yaw was born to Emerson A. and Harriet Yaw. He graduated from Montoursville High School and attended Bucknell University from 1961 to 1963. He served in the U.S. Army from 1964 to 1968 and graduated from the United States Army Field Artillery School in Fort Sill, Oklahoma. He was honorably discharged as first lieutenant after an overseas tour of duty as an artillery officer. He graduated from Lycoming College with a B.A. in 1970 and received a J.D. degree from American University in 1973.

== Career ==
He served as Lycoming County solicitor for 17 years and currently serves as a Republican member of the Pennsylvania Senate for the 23rd district since 2009.

He has been a supporter of legislation related to Marcellus Shale drilling and the gas industry.

He was a recipient of the National Federation of Independent Business Award for his voting record in support of small businesses in Pennsylvania.

=== Committee assignments ===
For the 2025–26 session, Yaw sits on the following committees in the State Senate:

- Environmental Resources & Energy (Chair)
- Judiciary (Vice Chair)
- Agriculture & Rural Affairs
- Banking & Insurance
- Community, Economic & Recreational Development
- Rules & Executive Nominations
