= Pennsylvania's 35th Senate district =

American legislative district

Pennsylvania's 35th State Senate district
Senator
Wayne Langerholc; R–Richland Township, Cambria County
- Population (2021): 260,141

Pennsylvania State Senate District 35 includes part of Centre County and all of Cambria County and Clearfield County. It is currently represented by Republican Wayne Langerholc.

== District profile ==
The district includes the following areas:

All of Cambria County

Centre County:

- Ferguson Township
- Halfmoon Township
- Huston Township
- Patton Township
- Philipsburg
- Port Matilda
- Rush Township
- Taylor Township
- Worth Township

All of Clearfield County

== Senators ==
Representative	Party	Years	District home	Note	Counties
W. Lewis Coppersmith	Democratic	1969–1972		Seated May 26, 1969	Cambria, Westmoreland (part)
W. Lewis Coppersmith	Democratic	1973–1980		Seated May 26, 1969	Cambria (part), Westmoreland (part)
Mark S. Singel	Democratic	1981–1982		Resigned January 20, 1987	Cambria (part), Westmoreland (part)
Mark S. Singel	Democratic	1983–1987		Resigned January 20, 1987	Cambria, Clearfield (part), Somerset (part)
William J. Stewart	Democratic	1987–1992		Seated 7 April 1987	Cambria, Clearfield (part), Somerset (part)
William J. Stewart	Democratic	1993–1996		Seated 7 April 1987	Cambria, Clearfield (part), Somerset (part), Westmoreland (part)
John N. Wozniak	Democratic	1997–2002			Cambria, Clearfield (part), Somerset (part), Westmoreland (part)
John N. Wozniak	Democratic	2003–2012			Cambria, Clinton, Centre (part), Clearfield (part), Westmoreland (part)
John N. Wozniak	Democratic	2013–2016			Bedford, Cambria, Clearfield (part)
Wayne Langerholc	Republican	2017–present			Bedford, Cambria, Clearfield (part)
