= Pennsylvania's 25th Senate district =

American legislative district

Pennsylvania's 25th State Senate district
Senator
Cris Dush; R–Pine Creek Township, Jefferson County
- Population (2021): 265,569

Pennsylvania State Senate District 25 includes parts of Centre County and Jefferson County and all of Cameron County, Clinton County, Elk County, McKean County, and Potter County. It is currently represented by Republican Cris Dush.

== District profile ==
The district includes the following areas:

All of Cameron County

Centre County

- Bellefonte
- Benner Township
- Boggs Township
- Burnside Township
- Centre Hall
- College Township
- Curtin Township
- Gregg Township
- Haines Township
- Harris Township
- Howard
- Howard Township
- Liberty Township
- Marion Township
- Miles Township
- Milesburg
- Millheim
- Penn Township
- Potter Township
- Snow Shoe
- Snow Shoe Township
- Spring Township
- State College
- Union Township
- Unionville
- Walker Township

All of Clinton County

All of Elk County,

Jefferson County

- Barnett Township
- Beaver Township
- Brockway
- Brookville
- Clover Township
- Corsica
- Eldred Township
- Falls Creek (Jefferson County portion)
- Heath Township
- Knox Township
- Pine Creek Township
- Reynoldsville
- Rose Township
- Snyder Township
- Summerville
- Sykesville
- Union Township
- Warsaw Township
- Washington Township
- Winslow Township

All of McKean County

All of Potter County

== Senators ==
Representative	Party	Years	District home	Note	Counties
Frank E. Baldwin	Republican	1917–1932			McKean, Potter, Tioga
James S. Berger	Republican	1945–1964			McKean, Potter, Tioga
James S. Berger	Republican	1965–1966			Cameron, Clinton, McKean, Potter, Warren
James S. Berger	Republican	1967–1968			Elk, Forest, McKean, Venango, Warren
Richard C. Frame	Republican	1969–1972		Redistricted from the 48th district. Died February 24, 1977.	Elk, Forest, McKean, Warren, Venango
Richard C. Frame	Republican	1973–1977		Redistricted from the 48th district. Died February 24, 1977.	Elk, Forest, McKean, Potter, Venango, Warren, Crawford (part)
Robert J. Kusse	Republican	1977–1982		Seated June 7, 1977.	Elk, Forest, McKean, Potter, Venango, Warren, Crawford (part)
Robert J. Kusse	Republican	1983–1984		Seated June 7, 1977.	Elk, Forest, McKean, Potter, Tioga, Clarion (part), Erie (part), Venango (part)
John E. Peterson	Republican	1985–1996			Elk, Forest, McKean, Potter, Tioga, Clarion (part), Erie (part), Venango (part)
John E. Peterson	Republican	1993–1996			Cameron, Elk, Forest, McKean, Potter, Warren, Clearfield (part), Erie (part), Jefferson (part), Venango (part)
Bill Slocum	Republican	1997 – 2000		Resigned June 1, 2000.	Cameron, Elk, Forest, McKean, Potter, Warren, Clearfield (part), Erie (part), Jefferson (part), Venango (part)
Joseph B. Scarnati	Republican	2001–2004	Borough of Brockway		Cameron, Elk, Forest, McKean, Potter, Warren, Clearfield (part), Erie (part), Jefferson (part), Venango (part)
Joseph B. Scarnati	Republican	2005–2014	Borough of Brockway		Cameron, Elk, Jefferson, McKean, Potter, Tioga, Clearfield (part), Warren (part)
Joseph B. Scarnati	Republican	2015–2020	Borough of Brockway		Cameron, Clinton, Elk, Jefferson, McKean, Potter, Tioga, Clearfield (part)
Cris Dush	Republican	2020 – present			
