= Pennsylvania's 23rd Senate district =

American legislative district

Pennsylvania's 23rd State Senate district
Senator
Gene Yaw; R–Williamsport
- Population (2021): 263,353

Pennsylvania State Senate District 23 includes all of Bradford County, Lycoming County, Sullivan County, Tioga County, and Union County. It is currently represented by Republican Gene Yaw.

== Senators ==
Representative	Party	Years	District home	Note
Zehnder H. Confair	Republican	1969 – 1972		Redistricted from the 24th district following the 1967-68 session.
Henry G. Hager III	Republican	1973 – 1984		Republican leader of the senate from 1977 to 1980. President pro tempore from 1981 to 1984
Roger A. Madigan	Republican	1985 – 2008		Pennsylvania State Representative for the 110th district from 1977 to 1984
Gene Yaw	Republican	2009 – present		
