= Pennsylvania's 33rd Senate district =

American legislative district

Pennsylvania's 33rd State Senate district
Senator
Doug Mastriano; R–Chambersburg
- Population (2021): 260,301

Pennsylvania State Senate District 33 includes all of Adams County and Franklin County. It is currently represented by Republican Doug Mastriano.

== Senators since 1933 ==
Representative	Party	Years	District home	Note	Counties
John S. Rice	Democratic	1933–1940			Adams, Franklin
Paul M. Crider	Republican	1941–1948			Adams, Franklin
Donald P. McPherson, Jr.	Republican	1949–1956			Adams, Franklin
Douglas H. Elliott	Republican	1957–1960		Resigned upon election to Congress	Adams, Franklin
D. Elmer Hawbaker	Republican	1961–1966			Adams, Franklin
D. Elmer Hawbaker	Republican	1967–1972			Franklin, Fulton, Huntingdon, Mifflin, Blair (part)
William J. Moore	Republican	1973–1982			Adams, Franklin, Fulton, Perry, Cumberland (part), Juniata (part)
William J. Moore	Republican	1983–1988			Adams, Franklin, Perry, Cumberland (part), Juniata (part)
Terry L. Punt	Republican	1989–1992			Adams, Franklin, Perry, Cumberland (part), Juniata (part)
Terry L. Punt	Republican	1993–2002			Adams, Franklin, Cumberland (part), York (part)
Terry L. Punt	Republican	2003–2008			Adams, Franklin, York (part)
Richard Alloway II	Republican	2009–2012		Resigned on February 28, 2019	Adams, Franklin, York (part)
Richard Alloway II	Republican	2013–2019		Resigned on February 28, 2019	Adams, Cumberland (part), Franklin (part), York (part)
Doug Mastriano	Republican	2019–2022		Seated June 10, 2019	Adams, Cumberland (part), Franklin (part), York (part)
Doug Mastriano	Republican	2023–present		Seated June 10, 2019	Adams, Franklin
