= 2004 Pennsylvania Senate election =

- November 2, 2004

All odd-numbered seats in the Pennsylvania State Senate 26 seats needed for a majority
	Majority party	Minority party
Leader	Robert Jubelirer	Bob Mellow
Party	Republican	Democratic
Leader's seat	30th district	22nd District
Last election	29	21
Seats won	14	11
Seats after	30	20
Seat change	▲1	▼1
- Results; Democratic hold Republican hold Republican gain No election

Elections for the Pennsylvania State Senate were held on November 2, 2004, with even-numbered districts being contested. State Senators are elected for four-year terms, with half of the Senate seats up for a vote every two years. The term of office for those elected in 2004 will run from January 4, 2005 through November 2008. Necessary primary elections were held on April 27, 2004.

Bob Regola, a Republican member of the Hempfield Township Board of Supervisors, defeated Democratic senator Allen G. Kukovich in the 39th senatorial district. Republican State Representative Pat Vance succeeded the retiring Republican Senator Harold F. Mowrey, Jr. Four senators who won special elections prior to the 2004 election, Dominic F. Pileggi, Connie Williams, John R. Gordner, and John Pippy, each won full terms.

== Predictions ==
Source	Ranking	As of
Rothenberg	Likely R	October 1, 2004

== Results ==
Affiliation	Members
Republican Party	30
Democratic Party	20
Total	50

== General Elections ==
District	Party	Incumbent	Status	Party	Candidate	Votes	%
1	Democratic	Vincent J. Fumo	re-elected	Democratic	Vincent J. Fumo	88,935	79.4
1	Democratic	Vincent J. Fumo	re-elected	Republican	John H. Morley, Jr.	23,073	30.6
3	Democratic	Shirley M. Kitchen	re-elected	Democratic	Shirley M. Kitchen	87,064	86.8
3	Democratic	Shirley M. Kitchen	re-elected	Republican	Philip Kerwick	13,207	13.2
5	Democratic	Mike Stack	re-elected	Democratic	Mike Stack	66,844	65.7
5	Democratic	Mike Stack	re-elected	Republican	Sam Mirarchi	34,829	34.3
7	Democratic	Vincent Hughes	re-elected	Democratic	Vincent Hughes	91,340	83.6
7	Democratic	Vincent Hughes	re-elected	Republican	Maryalice H. Devlin	17,980	16.4
9	Republican	Dominic F. Pileggi	re-elected	Republican	Dominic F. Pileggi	71,379	59.4
9	Republican	Dominic F. Pileggi	re-elected	Democratic	Thomas J. Bosak	48,784	40.6
11	Democratic	Michael O'Pake	re-elected	Democratic	Michael O'Pake	69,951	70.9
11	Democratic	Michael O'Pake	re-elected	Republican	Barbara J. Cummings	28,745	29.1
13	Republican	Gibson E. Armstrong	re-elected	Republican	Gibson E. Armstrong	71,925	65.5
13	Republican	Gibson E. Armstrong	re-elected	Democratic	John Gouveia	37,870	34.5
15	Republican	Jeffrey E. Piccola	re-elected	Republican	Jeffrey E. Piccola	70,058	61.1
15	Republican	Jeffrey E. Piccola	re-elected	Democratic	Eric J. Epstein	44,653	38.9
17	Democratic	Connie Williams	re-elected	Democratic	Connie Williams	80,372	64.5
17	Democratic	Connie Williams	re-elected	Republican	Ted Barry	44,224	35.5
19	Republican	Robert J. Thompson	re-elected	Republican	Robert J. Thompson	96,582	100.0
21	Republican	Mary Jo White	re-elected	Republican	Mary Jo White	66,292	67.7
21	Republican	Mary Jo White	re-elected	Democratic	Kevan M. Yenerall	29,348	30.0
21	Republican	Mary Jo White	re-elected	Libertarian	Michael J. Robertson	22,90	2.3
23	Republican	Roger A. Madigan	re-elected	Republican	Roger A. Madigan	73,048	73.5
23	Republican	Roger A. Madigan	re-elected	Democratic	Grant Berry, Jr.	26,313	26.5
25	Republican	Joseph B. Scarnati III	re-elected	Republican	Joseph B. Scarnati III	74,383	89.5
25	Republican	Joseph B. Scarnati III	re-elected	Constitution	Alan Kiser	8,694	10.5
27	Republican	John R. Gordner	re-elected	Republican	John R. Gordner	67,236	70.4
27	Republican	John R. Gordner	re-elected	Democratic	John J. Boback	28,288	29.6
29	Republican	James J. Rhoades	re-elected	Republican	James J. Rhoades	67,743	65.7
29	Republican	James J. Rhoades	re-elected	Democratic	Michael P. Halcovage	35,379	34.3
31	Republican	Harold F. Mowrey, Jr.	retired	Republican	Patricia H. Vance	86,741	72.9
31	Republican	Harold F. Mowrey, Jr.	retired	Democratic	Sean Quinlan	29,148	24.5
31	Republican	Harold F. Mowrey, Jr.	retired	Independent	Jeffrey T. Gerace	3,027	2.5
33	Republican	Terry Punt	re-elected	Republican	Terry Punt	83,790	76.5
33	Republican	Terry Punt	re-elected	Democratic	Donald R. Richards	25766	23.5
35	Democratic	John N. Wozniak	re-elected	Democratic	John N. Wozniak	93,500	100.0
37	Republican	John Pippy	re-elected	Republican	John Pippy	88,306	67.8
37	Republican	John Pippy	re-elected	Democratic	Gianni Floro	41,954	32.2
39	Democratic	Allen G. Kukovich	defeated for re-election	Republican	Bob Regola	58,107	52.4
39	Democratic	Allen G. Kukovich	defeated for re-election	Democratic	Allen G. Kukovich	52,743	47.6
41	Republican	Donald C. White	re-elected	Republican	Donald C. White	97,941	100.0
43	Democratic	Jay Costa, Jr.	re-elected	Democratic	Jay Costa, Jr.	90,408	100.0
45	Democratic	Sean F. Logan	re-elected	Democratic	Sean F. Logan	72,943	100.0
47	Democratic	Gerald J. La Valle	re-elected	Democratic	Gerald J. La Valle	95,952	100.0
49	Republican	Jane M. Earll	re-elected	Republican	Jane M. Earll	67,658	65.8
49	Republican	Jane M. Earll	re-elected	Democratic	Tony Logue	35,194	34.2
