= 2000 Pennsylvania Senate election =

- November 7, 2000

All odd-numbered seats in the Pennsylvania State Senate 26 seats needed for a majority
	Majority party	Minority party
Leader	Robert Jubelirer	Bob Mellow
Party	Republican	Democratic
Leader's seat	30th district	22nd District
Seats before	30	20
Seats after	30	20
Seat change	Steady	Steady
- Results; Democratic hold Democratic gain Republican hold Republican gain No election
President Pro Tempore before election
Robert Jubelirer
Republican
President Pro Tempore
Robert Jubelirer
Republican

Elections for the Pennsylvania State Senate were held on November 7, 2000, with even-numbered districts being contested. State Senators are elected for four-year terms, with half of the Senate seats up for a vote every two years. The term of office for those elected in 2000 ran from January 3, 2001 until November 30, 2004. Necessary primary elections were held on April 27, 2004.

The make-up of the senate remained the same following the 2000 elections. Democratic Mike Stack defeated incumbent Republican Frank A. Salvatore in the 5th senatorial district. Republican Donald C. White defeated the democratic nominee to succeed the retiring Patrick J. Stapleton, Jr. in the 41st senatorial district. Democratic Sean Logan succeeded the retiring Albert V. Belan.

Republican Bill Slocum remained on the ballot in the 25th senatorial district, even after his resignation from the senate on June 1, 2000. Slocum pleaded guilty and spent a month in federal prison for filing false reports to the Pennsylvania Department of Environmental Protection and discharging raw sewage into Brokenstraw Creek while he was a sewage plant manager in Youngsville, Pennsylvania. The local Republican party supported the eventual winner, Joseph B. Scarnati III, who ran as an independent and changed his party registration to Republican after his election.

== General election ==
District	Party	Incumbent	Status	Party	Candidate	Votes	%
1	Democratic	Vincent J. Fumo	re-elected	Democratic	Vincent J. Fumo	64,877	81.1
1	Democratic	Vincent J. Fumo	re-elected	Republican	George Jacob	15,114	18.9
3	Democratic	Shirley M. Kitchen	re-elected	Democratic	Shirley M. Kitchen	61,895	100.0
5	Republican	Frank A. Salvatore	defeated	Democratic	Mike Stack	46,980	52.6
5	Republican	Frank A. Salvatore	defeated	Republican	Frank A. Salvatore	42,416	47.4
7	Democratic	Vincent Hughes	re-elected	Democratic	Vincent Hughes	69,777	100.0
9	Republican	Clarence D. Bell	re-elected	Republican	Clarence D. Bell	66,345	100.0
11	Democratic	Michael O'Pake	re-elected	Democratic	Michael O'Pake	81,926	94.9
11	Democratic	Michael O'Pake	re-elected	Green	Jennaro Pullano	4,405	5.1
13	Republican	Gibson E. Armstrong	re-elected	Republican	Gibson E. Armstrong	63,581	68.7
13	Republican	Gibson E. Armstrong	re-elected	Democratic	Ricci Dehl	28,964	31.3
15	Republican	Jeffrey E. Piccola	re-elected	Republican	Jeffrey E. Piccola	65,718	67.3
15	Republican	Jeffrey E. Piccola	re-elected	Democratic	D. Ann Smilek	31,881	32.7
17	Republican	Richard A. Tilghman	re-elected	Republican	Richard A. Tilghman	57,664	50.3
17	Republican	Richard A. Tilghman	re-elected	Democratic	Lynn Yeakel	44,224	35.5
19	Republican	Robert J. Thompson	re-elected	Republican	Robert J. Thompson	70,210	63.3
19	Republican	Robert J. Thompson	re-elected	Democratic	Thomas J. Bosak	40,749	36.7
21	Republican	Mary Jo White	re-elected	Republican	Mary Jo White	73,423	87.6
21	Republican	Mary Jo White	re-elected	Libertarian	Vernon L. Etzel	10,405	12.4
23	Republican	Roger A. Madigan	re-elected	Republican	Roger A. Madigan	67,698	100.0
25	Republican	Bill Slocum	resigned, but remained on the ballot	Independent	Joseph B. Scarnati III	29,346	32.9
25	Republican	Bill Slocum	resigned, but remained on the ballot	Democratic	Joseph J. Calla, Jr.	29,149	32.7
25	Republican	Bill Slocum	resigned, but remained on the ballot	Republican	Bill Slocum	28,209	31.6
25	Republican	Bill Slocum	resigned, but remained on the ballot	Constitution	Alan R. Kiser	2,460	2.8
27	Republican	Edward W. Helfrick	re-elected	Republican	Edward W. Helfrick	61,335	100.0
29	Republican	James J. Rhoades	re-elected	Republican	James J. Rhoades	87,397	100.0
31	Republican	Harold F. Mowery, Jr.	re-elected	Republican	Harold F. Mowery, Jr.	66,112	65.9
31	Republican	Harold F. Mowery, Jr.	re-elected	Democratic	James H. Hertzler	34,227	34.1
33	Republican	Terry Punt	re-elected	Republican	Terry Punt	92,456	100.0
35	Democratic	John N. Wozniak	re-elected	Democratic	John N. Wozniak	66,625	77.1
35	Democratic	John N. Wozniak	re-elected	Democratic	J. Anthony Connell	19,799	22.9
37	Republican	Tim Murphy	re-elected	Republican	Tim Murphy	73,198	64.3
37	Republican	Tim Murphy	re-elected	Democratic	Joseph Rudolph	40,661	36.7
39	Democratic	Allen G. Kukovich	re-elected	Democratic	Allen G. Kukovich	54,358	57.6
39	Democratic	Allen G. Kukovich	re-elected	Republican	Gene Porterfield	40,017	42.4
41	Democratic	Patrick J. Stapleton, Jr.	retired	Republican	Don White	46,239	53.8
41	Democratic	Patrick J. Stapleton, Jr.	retired	Democratic	James McQuown	39,629	46.2
43	Democratic	Jay Costa, Jr.	re-elected	Democratic	Jay Costa, Jr.	71,210	100.0
45	Democratic	Albert V. Belan	retired	Democratic	Sean F. Logan	56,775	61.1
45	Democratic	Albert V. Belan	retired	Republican	Laurie Zacharia MacDonald	36,183	38.9
47	Democratic	Gerald J. LaValle	re-elected	Democratic	Gerald J. LaValle	86,647	100.0
49	Republican	Jane M. Earll	re-elected	Republican	Jane M. Earll	53,617	57.7
49	Republican	Jane M. Earll	re-elected	Democratic	John Paul Jones	39,254	42.3
