= Joe Pittman (politician) =

American politician (born 1977)

Majority Leader of the Pennsylvania Senate
- Incumbent
- Assumed office November 30, 2022
- Preceded by: Kim Ward

Member of the Pennsylvania Senate from the 41st district
- Incumbent
- Assumed office June 10, 2019
- Preceded by: Donald C. White

Personal details
- Born: March 31, 1977 (age 49) Hillsdale, Pennsylvania, U.S.
- Party: Republican
- Spouse: Gina
- Children: 4
- Education: Pennsylvania State University (BA)
- Website: Official website

Joseph A. Pittman (born March 31, 1977) is an American politician serving as a member of the Pennsylvania State Senate for the 41st district since 2019. A Republican, he has served as the majority leader of the State Senate since 2022. Prior to being elected by his colleagues to serve as majority leader, Pittman served as chairman of the Senate Urban Affairs and Housing committee, vice chairman of the Senate Environmental Resources & Energy committee, and as a member of the Appropriations, Banking & Insurance, Consumer Protection & Professional Licensure, and Judiciary committees. He was also a member of the Pennsylvania Infrastructure Investment Authority (PENNVEST) Board of Directors.

== Early life and education ==
Pittman was born on March 31, 1977, in Hillsdale, Pennsylvania. He graduated from Purchase Line High School in 1995 and was appointed to the local school board at age 18; he continued in service on the board until his graduation from Pennsylvania State University in December 1998 with a bachelor's degree in political science.

== Political career ==
Pittman joined Donald C. White's successful campaign for State Senate in 2000 and was named his chief of staff at age 23. In February 2019, White resigned as state senator and a special election was scheduled for May 21, 2019, to determine his successor. Pittman announced his candidacy for the seat in March 2019 and the Pennsylvania Republican Party supported him unanimously as their candidate. Pittman won nearly two-thirds of the vote against Democratic challenger Susan Boser and became the next state senator for the 41st district.

For the 2025–2026 session, Pittman serves as the majority floor leader and sits on the following committees:

- Rules & Executive Nominations (chair)
- Appropriations (ex-officio)

== Personal life ==
Pittman and his wife Gina live in Indiana, Pennsylvania, with their two sons and twin daughters.

Pennsylvania State Senate
Preceded by Donald C. White	Member of the Pennsylvania Senate from the 41st district 2019–present	Incumbent
Preceded by Kim Ward	Majority Leader of the Pennsylvania Senate; 2022–present	Incumbent
