= Chester Hale Sipe =

American politician

Member of the Pennsylvania Senate from the 41st district
- In office January 1937 – December 1940
- Preceded by: Peter Graff III
- Succeeded by: Jacob W. Carr
- Constituency: Parts of Armstrong, Butler, Counties

Personal details
- Born: November 16, 1880 South Buffalo Township, Pennsylvania
- Died: July 26, 1960 (aged 79)
- Party: Democratic
- Spouse: Cleo Victoria McKee Sipe
- Education: Thiel College
- Occupation: Attorney

Chester Hale Sipe (November 16, 1880,– July 26, 1960) was a member of the Pennsylvania State Senate who served from to 1937 to 1940.

== Biography ==
Sipe was born November 27, 1880 in South Buffalo Township, Pennsylvania to Hiram Hill and Mary Golden Sipe.

He was first elected to Senate in the 1940 election, winning the 41st district as a Democrat.

He died July 26, 1960 and was buried in McVille Union Cemetery, South Buffalo Township, Pennsylvania.
