= Senator Hopper =

Senator Hopper may refer to:

- John Hopper (politician) (1923–1996), Pennsylvania State Senate
- Randy Hopper (born 1966), Wisconsin State Senate

== See also ==
- Senator Hooper (disambiguation)
