= Senator Myers =

Senator Myers may refer to:

== Members of the United States Senate ==
- Francis J. Myers (1901–1956), U.S. Senator from Pennsylvania from 1945 to 1951
- Henry L. Myers (1862–1943), U.S. Senator from Montana from 1911 to 1923

== United States state senate members ==
- Brach Myers, Louisiana State Senate
- David Myers (Oklahoma politician) (1938–2011), Oklahoma State Senate
- Doc Myers (1930–2010), Florida State Senate
- James Myers (politician) (1795–1864), Ohio State Senate
- Judith A. Myers (born 1939), Illinois State Senate
- Ken Myers (politician) (1933–2007), Florida State Senate
- Michael Myers (New York politician) (1753–1814), New York State Senate
- Robert Myers Jr. (born 1983), Alaska State Senate
- Robert L. Myers (politician) (1928–1993), Pennsylvania State Senate
