= Jacob W. Carr =

American politician

Jacob Walter Carr

Member of the Pennsylvania Senate from the 41st district
- In office January 1941 – December 1948
- Preceded by: Chester Hale Sipe
- Succeeded by: Albert Pechan
- Constituency: Parts of Armstrong, Butler, Counties

Personal details
- Born: November 27, 1886 Natrona Heights, Pennsylvania
- Died: May 6, 1977 (aged 90)
- Party: Republican

Jacob W Carr (November 27, 1886 – April 16, 1977) was a member of the Pennsylvania State Senate who served from to 1941 to 1948.

== Biography ==
Carr was born November 27, 1886 in Natrona Heights, Pennsylvania to David and Mary (nee Walter) Carr.

He was first elected to the Pennsylvania Senate in 1940 as a Republican representing the 41st district. During his time in the senate he served on several committees, such as Agriculture, Constitutional Changes (serving as the chairman), Elections, Federal Relations, Insurance, Labor and Industry, Law and Order, Public Health, Representative Apportionment and Workman’s Compensation.

Carr died on May 16, 1977, and was buried at Greenlawn Burial Estates in Butler, Pennsylvania.
