= Greg Rothman =

American politician and businessman (born 1966)

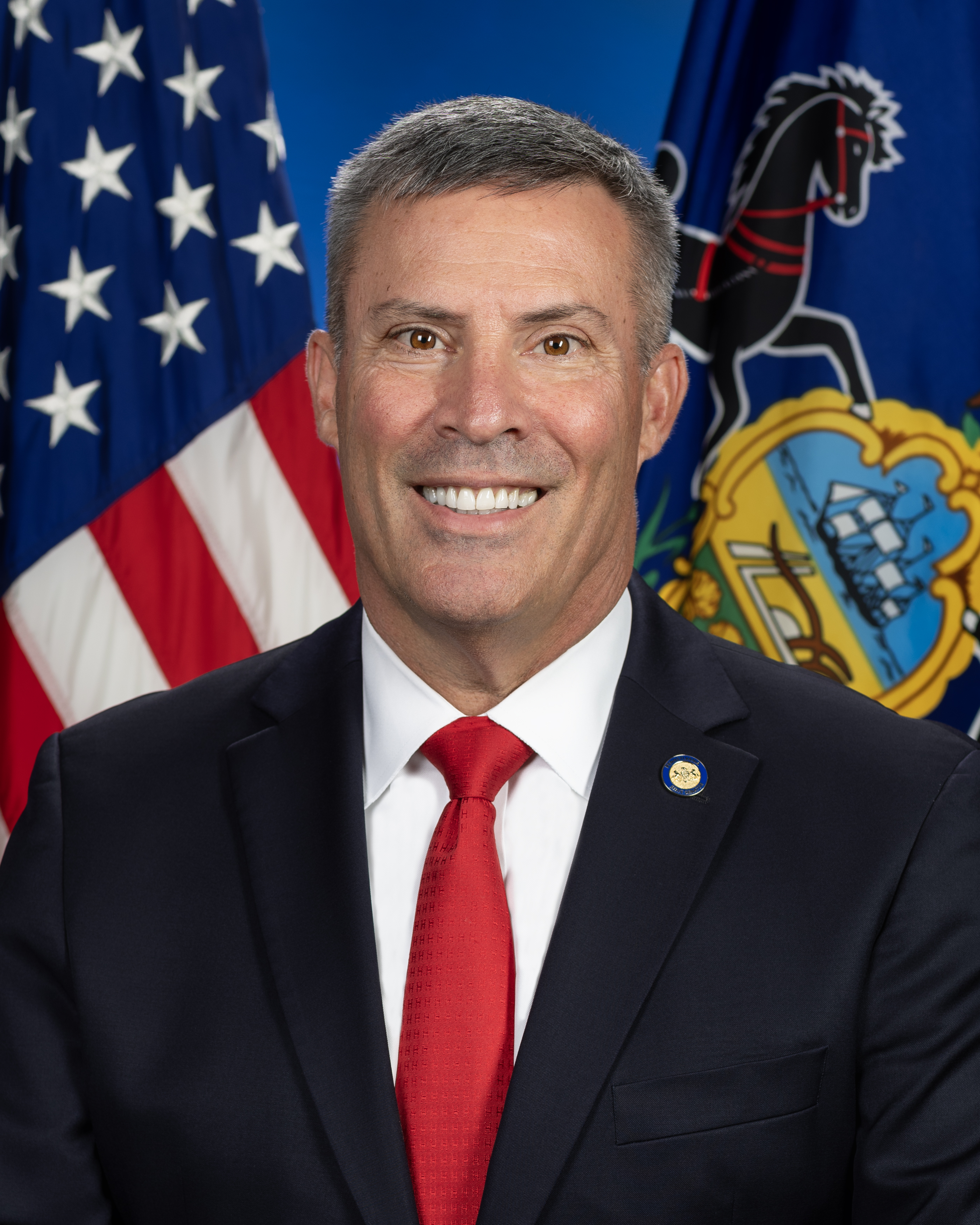
- Official portrait, 2025

Chair of the Pennsylvania Republican Party
- Incumbent
- Assumed office February 8, 2025
- Preceded by: Lawrence Tabas

Member of the Pennsylvania Senate from the 34th district
- Incumbent
- Assumed office January 3, 2023
- Preceded by: Jake Corman

Member of the Pennsylvania House of Representatives from the 87th district
- In office August 25, 2015 – November 30, 2022
- Preceded by: Glen Grell
- Succeeded by: Thomas Kutz

Personal details
- Born: William Gregory Rothman; December 10, 1966 (age 59) Harrisburg, Pennsylvania, U.S.
- Party: Republican
- Spouse: Porsha Gaughen
- Children: 5
- Education: University of Massachusetts, Amherst (BS); Johns Hopkins University (MS)
- Website: Official website

Military service
- Branch/service: United States Marine Corps; Marine Corps Reserve
- Years of service: 1991–2001
- Rank: Staff Sergeant
- Battles/wars: Gulf War

William Gregory Rothman (born December 10, 1966) is an American politician and businessman. He has been a Republican member of the Pennsylvania State Senate for the 34th district since 2023. Rothman previously represented the 87th district in the Pennsylvania House of Representatives from 2015 to 2022. In 2025, he was elected chairman of the Pennsylvania Republican Party.

== Early life and education ==
Rothman was born on December 10, 1966, in Harrisburg, Pennsylvania. He graduated from Cumberland Valley High School in 1985 and earned a Bachelor of Science degree in political science from the University of Massachusetts Amherst in 1989. In 1991, during Operation Desert Storm, Rothman enlisted in the United States Marine Corps Reserve, rising to the rank of staff sergeant. He was honorably discharged from the reserves in 2001. Rothman then earned a Master of Science degree in real estate from Johns Hopkins University in 2005.

== Political career ==
=== Early career ===
Rothman was chair of the Bush-Cheney 2004 re-election campaign in Cumberland County, Pennsylvania. He was a volunteer aide on the Rick Santorum's 2012 presidential campaign, often appearing in Santorum's entourage.

=== Pennsylvania House of Representatives ===
In August 2015, Rothman was elected to the Pennsylvania House of Representatives in a special election to fill a vacancy in the 87th district. The vacancy arose from the resignation of Glen Grell, who stepped down to become executive director of the Pennsylvania Public School Employees' Retirement System. The district included Camp Hill, East Pennsboro Township, and Hampden Township, as well as a part of Silver Spring Township; Rothman lives in Silver Spring Township. He was reelected in 2016, 2018, and 2020.

In 2016, Rothman was the chair of the Cumberland County Republican Party. He supported Donald Trump's 2016 presidential campaign, and was on Trump's team at the 2016 Republican National Convention arranging convention operations. Rothman defended Republican senator Pat Toomey from intra-party critics who asserted that Toomey was insufficiently pro-Trump.

In 2019, Rothman sponsored legislation to shorten the time period for evictions in Pennsylvania. The bill was supported by landlords' organizations and opposed by tenant and low-income housing advocacy organizations. He supported a reduction in Pennsylvania's corporate net income tax and abolition of the state's inheritance tax. Rothman was the leading supporter of legislation, signed into law in 2019, that established 21 as the minimum age to purchase tobacco products, including e-cigarettes, except for active-duty military personnel and honorably discharged veterans, for which the minimum age remained 18. The exemption was criticized by tobacco control groups.

In 2020, Rothman was chair of the House Republican Campaign Committee, leading the campaign efforts for the Pennsylvania House Republicans.

In 2021, as part of Republican efforts to enhance voting credibility following the 2020 presidential election, Rothman supported a bill to rewrite Pennsylvania's election laws by requiring voter ID. Governor Tom Wolf vetoed the bill.

=== Pennsylvania State Senate ===
In 2022, Rothman was elected to represent the 34th district in the Pennsylvania State Senate.

For the 2025-2026 Session, Rothman sits on the following committees in the State Senate:

- Game & Fisheries (chair)
- Agriculture & Rural Affairs
- Banking & Insurance
- Education
- Finance
- Rules & Executive Nominations
- Transportation

=== Chair of the Pennsylvania Republican Party ===
In December 2024, Lawrence Tabas, the chairman of the Pennsylvania Republican Party, announced that he would not run for reelection. Rothman subsequently launched his bid for the position, gaining support from U.S. Senator Dave McCormick, Congressman Dan Meuser, and Pennsylvania Treasurer Stacy Garrity. The support from prominent Republicans was credited with clearing the field of Rothman's only challenger who withdrew from contention. Another challenger for the position would emerge, but Rothman would defeat that contender by a 2-1 margin in the February 2025 party election.

=== Data center development and real estate interests ===
In 2025–2026, Rothman became involved in Pennsylvania's debate over data center development while also having financial ties to property that was subsequently sold for a major data center project in Cumberland County. Rothman is chairman of RSR Realtors, a real estate company founded by his father, and had provided real estate services to the previous owner of the more than 500-acre PennTerra property in Middlesex Township for approximately two decades. RSR Realtors received a real estate fee when the property was sold for $30 million in June 2025 to developers associated with the PAX-1 data center project. Rothman did not disclose the amount of the fee when questioned by Spotlight PA. Real estate advisor Igal Feibush, who represented the seller and later became CEO of Pennsylvania Data Center Partners, said that Rothman was paid for prior work when the transaction closed.

Less than one month after the property sale closed, Rothman introduced legislation intended to make Pennsylvania more attractive to data center and artificial-intelligence development. The original legislation proposed expedited permitting and would have limited municipalities' ability to impose data center regulations more restrictive than those applied to other industrial developments. Rothman described the legislation as a way to capitalize on Pennsylvania's opportunity to attract investment associated with the artificial-intelligence industry. The municipal-regulation provisions and expedited-permitting language were subsequently removed from the bill.

The timing of Rothman's financial connection to the PennTerra property and his subsequent advocacy for policies favorable to data center development prompted criticism from local opponents of the PAX-1 project. Rothman said RSR Realtors had never been involved with the PAX-1 project itself and that he had not participated in negotiating the eventual sale to the data center developer. He also stated that campaign contributions from individuals associated with the project, which included Feibush and other people connected with PAX-1, did not influence his legislative decisions.

The PAX-1 project is planned as a three-campus data center development with an estimated investment of approximately $15 billion and projected capacity of 1.35 gigawatts. Separately, Pennsylvania's data center sales-tax exemption has come under scrutiny; a 2026 analysis by Spotlight PA reported that state budget estimates projected substantially increasing forgone tax revenue from the exemption, with estimates reaching hundreds of millions of dollars annually by 2031.

== Personal life ==
Rothman has spent several decades in the real estate business. He was a real estate agent and then president and CEO of RSR Realtors, a real estate company founded by his father that is based in Lemoyne, Pennsylvania. Rothman was also part owner of the Harrisburg Senators, a Minor League Baseball team, and played a key role in moving the team to the state’s capital.

In 1991, Rothman pleaded guilty to a misdemeanor charge of conspiracy to commit forgery. The conviction was later expunged by governor Ed Rendell, who issued Rothman a pardon in January 2011. In 2015, Rothman said that he had learned from his mistake and took responsibility for it.

== Electoral history ==
2015 Pennsylvania House of Representatives special election, District 87
Party	Candidate	Votes	%
Republican	Greg Rothman	4,202	59.76%
Democratic	Robert Charles	2,829	40.24%
Total votes		7,031	100.00%
Republican hold			

2016 Pennsylvania House of Representatives election, District 87
Party	Candidate	Votes	%
Republican	Greg Rothman (incumbent)	22,991	62.68%
Democratic	Jim Massey	13,687	37.32%
Total votes		36,678	100.00%
Republican hold			

2018 Pennsylvania House of Representatives election, District 87
Party	Candidate	Votes	%
Republican	Greg Rothman (incumbent)	18,546	56.61%
Democratic	Sean Quinlan	14,214	43.39%
Total votes		32,760	100.00%
Republican hold			

2020 Pennsylvania House of Representatives election, District 87
Party	Candidate	Votes	%
Republican	Greg Rothman (incumbent)	24,239	55.92%
Democratic	Nicole Miller	19,104	44.08%
Total votes		43,343	100.00%
Republican hold			

2022 Pennsylvania Senate election, District 34
Party	Candidate	Votes	%
Republican	Greg Rothman	74,238	63.54%
Democratic	Jim Massey	42,598	36.46%
Total votes		116,836	100.00%
Republican hold			

Party political offices
Preceded by Lawrence Tabas	Chair of the Pennsylvania Republican Party; 2025–present	Incumbent
