= Kim Ward =

American politician (born 1955 or 1956)

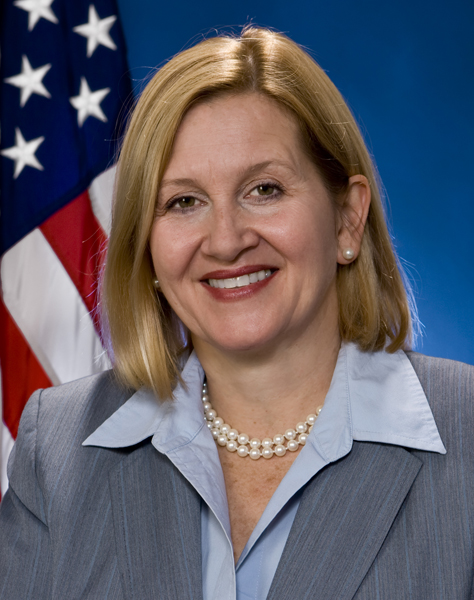
- Official portrait, 2010

President pro tempore of the Pennsylvania Senate
- Incumbent
- Assumed office December 1, 2022; Acting: December 1, 2022 – January 2, 2023
- Preceded by: Jake Corman

Acting Lieutenant Governor of Pennsylvania
- In office January 3, 2023 – January 17, 2023
- Governor: Tom Wolf
- Preceded by: John Fetterman
- Succeeded by: Austin Davis

Majority Leader of the Pennsylvania Senate
- In office November 12, 2020 – November 30, 2022
- Preceded by: Jake Corman
- Succeeded by: Joe Pittman

Member of the Pennsylvania Senate from the 39th district
- Incumbent
- Assumed office January 6, 2009
- Preceded by: Bob Regola

Personal details
- Born: Kim Lee Renko; 1955 or 1956 (age 70–71)
- Party: Republican
- Spouse: Thomas Ward
- Children: 3
- Education: Community College of Allegheny County (attended); University of Pittsburgh (attended); Middle Tennessee State University (attended)
- Website: Official website

Kim Lee Ward (née Renko, born 1955 or 1956) is an American politician who has served as president pro tempore of the Pennsylvania Senate since 2022. A Republican, she was first elected to the State Senate in 2008, to represent the 39th district which covers the central portions of Westmoreland County, Pennsylvania. Following the resignation of US Senator-elect John Fetterman as lieutenant governor, Ward became acting lieutenant governor on January 3, 2023, and served for two weeks, completing Fetterman's term. She is the first female president pro tempore of the Pennsylvania Senate.

== Early career ==
Ward started her political involvement during the 1994 U.S. Senate campaign of former senator Rick Santorum, when she served as the county chair for his Westmoreland County campaign. In 1999, she ran the successful election of Scott Connor to county commissioner in Westmoreland County. She served as the Southwest Regional Director for Santorum's 2000 reelection bid.

From 2000 until 2002 Ward owned and operated a consulting and government outreach firm called Commonwealth Political Associates.

In 2001, Ward won election as a Hempfield Township Supervisor.

In 2002, Ward joined the administration of governor Mark Schweiker.

Following her time with Schweiker's administration, Ward returned to her political consulting, running 84 Lumber founder Joe Hardy's successful election as commissioner in Fayette County, Pennsylvania.

In 2004 Ward served as the southwest political director for the reelection campaign of president George W. Bush. She would reprise this role for former senator Rick Santorum's 2006 reelection campaign.

== Westmoreland County commissioner ==
In late 2006, Ward announced that she would run for Westmoreland County commissioner in the 2007 election. Ward would form a partnership with Penn Township commissioner George Dunbar, who was endorsed by the Westmoreland Republican committee in a concerted effort to win a majority in the county courthouse for the first time in over 50 years.

While Dunbar fell short, Ward became the first woman elected as county commissioner in over three decades. She was succeeded by Charles Anderson.

== Pennsylvania Senate ==
=== Elections ===
==== 2008 ====
In 2008, Ward was called upon to fill the vacancy on the ballot created by state senator Bob Regola's withdrawal from consideration. Ward entered the race in August and engaged one of the most expensive campaigns in the district's history against the Democratic nominee, Tony Bompiani. The campaign centered around Bompiani's time as a Hempfield Area School Board member and Ward's time as a Hempfield Township supervisor

Ward won the election with 54% of the vote.

==== 2012 ====
In 2012 Kim Ward was courted to run against U.S. Senator Bob Casey Jr.. She opted to run for reelection to her State Senate seat, which she did by winning both Republican and Democratic nominations.

=== Tenure ===
==== 2009–2010 legislative session ====
Ward was sworn into her first term on January 6, 2009. She was appointed as vice chair of the Banking and Insurance Committee as well as being a member of the Communications and Technology, Consumer Protection & Professional Licensure, Public Health & Welfare and the Veterans Affairs & Emergency Preparedness Committees.

Ward's first year in the State Senate was marked by a long budget process which lasted into October, well past the June 30th deadline. She was critical of governor Ed Rendell's leadership and his call for tax increases during the impasse.

On October 27, 2010, Ward saw her first piece of legislation signed into law: Senate Bill 1181. The bill made amendments to insurance law in Pennsylvania.

During this legislative session, Ward began her efforts to reform Methadone treatment practices in Pennsylvania. Ward sponsored SR 348, which mandated an audit of Pennsylvania's methadone treatment programs. The Senate passed SR 348 in June 2010. Ward further called for reforms in the oversight of the program in a letter to the Department of Public Welfare.

==== 2011–2012 legislative session ====
In the 2011–2012 Legislative Session, Ward renewed her push to reform methadone treatment practices in Pennsylvania. Governor Tom Corbett signed Ward's Senate Bill 638 into law, which mandated that those who were treated for addiction with methadone and used state funded transportation had to use their nearest methadone clinic.

On April 23, 2012, at a conference, Ward proposed a legislation law named "Jennifer's Law" (named after Jennifer Daugherty, a mentally disabled woman who was tortured to death). The proposal would make it illegal for someone to witness a violent crime and fail to report it to police. Violation to report the crime would be a misdemeanor of the third degree.

Ward also led the effort to institute E-Verify in Pennsylvania. Ward introduced Senate Bill 637, which was passed, and mandates that all contractors within the state verify that their employees are documented as eligible employees.

Ward also passed bills providing benefits for Volunteer Fire Companies (SB 866), giving certain municipalities the ability to require police officers to live in the municipality (SB 1572), and restricting insurance companies from mandating prices on dental procedures that they don't cover (SB 1144.)

Following the Penn State Child Abuse Scandal, Ward, as the chair of the Senate Aging and Youth Committee, introduced Senate Resolution 250 which created the Task Force on Child Protection. The Task Force would issue a report in November 2012 which would lead to legislation in the 2013–2014 legislative session.

==== 2013–2014 legislative session ====
Ward was appointed chair of the Economic, Community, Economic & Recreational Development Committee. She also serves as the vice chair of the Aging and Youth Committee and as a member of the Banking & Insurance, Environmental Resources & Energy, Public Health & Welfare and Rules & Executive Nominations committees.

Ward, along with a bipartisan group of state senators, introduced legislation recommended by the Child Protection Task Force. Ward's bills would alter who is a mandated reporter of child abuse and increase penalties for failing to report suspected child abuse.

==== 2019–2020 legislative session ====
Ward was the sponsor of SB 1166, a proposed constitutional amendment which would require the General Assembly to vote to approve extending an emergency declaration beyond 21 days.

==== 2020-2021 legislative session ====
Ward opposed an amendment to Act 16, the medical marijuana law, that would have allowed medical patients to grow six plants at home. Ward was the senator that made the motion to table the homegrow amendment introduced by senator Shariff Street in association with House Bill 1024.

==== 2020 presidential election ====
Following pressure by president Donald Trump, Ward was part of an effort calling on Congress to reject president-elect Joe Biden's win in Pennsylvania.

==== President pro tempore of the Pennsylvania Senate ====
In November 2022, Ward was chosen to succeed president pro tempore of the Pennsylvania Senate Jake Corman on an interim basis from December 1, 2022 to January 2, 2023. On January 3, 2023, she was elected as the permanent president pro tempore for the legislative session, becoming Pennsylvania's first female president pro tempore. Following the resignation of lieutenant governor John Fetterman, Ward became acting lieutenant governor on January 3, 2023, and served until January 17, 2023, completing Fetterman's term. After Democrats took control of the state Senate in the 2026 election, Ward announced that she would not seek leadership in the Republican caucus for the next session.

== Personal life ==
Ward grew up in Meadowlands, Pennsylvania, the daughter of Roger and Joanna Renko. She attended Community College of Allegheny County, University of Pittsburgh, and Middle Tennessee State University. Ward currently lives in Greensburg with her husband, Dr. Thomas Ward. She has three grown sons, Tom, Matthew, and Michael.

Pennsylvania State Senate
Preceded by Bob Regola	Member of the Pennsylvania Senate from the 39th district 2009–present	Incumbent
Preceded by Jake Corman	Majority Leader of the Pennsylvania Senate; 2020–2022	Succeeded by Joe Pittman
Preceded by Jake Corman	President pro tempore of the Pennsylvania Senate; 2022–present Acting: 2022–2023	Incumbent
Political offices
Preceded by John Fetterman	Lieutenant Governor of Pennsylvania; Acting; 2023	Succeeded by Austin Davis
