= John Herman Dent =

American politician

John H. Dent
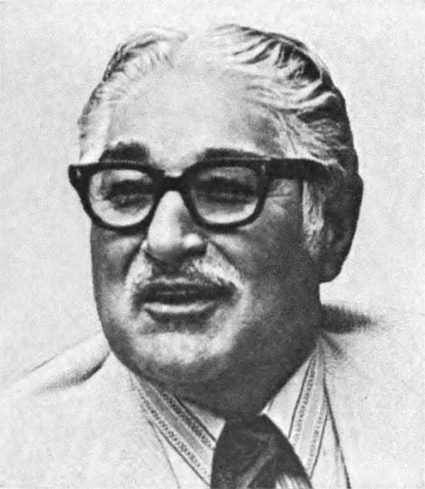

Member of the U.S. House of Representatives from Pennsylvania's 21st district
- In office January 21, 1958 – January 3, 1979
- Preceded by: Augustine Kelley
- Succeeded by: Donald Bailey

Democratic Leader of the Pennsylvania Senate
- In office January 3, 1939 – January 21, 1958
- Preceded by: John Rice
- Succeeded by: Charles Weiner

Member of the Pennsylvania Senate from the 39th district
- In office January 5, 1937 – January 21, 1958
- Preceded by: Benjamin Thompson
- Succeeded by: Paul Mahady

Member of the Pennsylvania House of Representatives from the Westmoreland County district
- In office January 1, 1935 – November 30, 1936

Personal details
- Born: John Herman Dent; March 10, 1908 Jeannette, Pennsylvania, U.S.
- Died: April 9, 1988 (aged 80) Jeannette, Pennsylvania, U.S.
- Party: Democratic

John Herman Dent (March 10, 1908 – April 9, 1988) was an American politician who served eleven terms as a Democratic member of the U.S. House of Representatives from Pennsylvania from 1958 to 1979.

== Early life and education ==
John Dent was born in Jeannette, Pennsylvania, to Samuel and Genevieve Dent. He was educated in the public schools of Armstrong and Westmoreland counties, the Naval Station Great Lakes, and through correspondence school courses.

== Business activities ==
He was a member of the local council of the United Rubber Workers from 1923 to 1937, and served as president of Local 18759, on the executive council, and as a member of the international council. He operated the Kelden Coal & Coke Co. of Hunker, and the Building & Transportation Co. of Trafford, and Jeannette.

== Government activities ==
He was a Jeannette City Councilman from 1932 to 1934. He served in the United States Marine Air Corps from 1924 to 1928. He was a member of the Pennsylvania State House of Representatives from 1935 to 1936, and a member of the Pennsylvania State Senate from 1937 to 1958. He was the Democratic Floor Leader in the State Senate from 1939 until 1958.

=== Congress ===
He was elected in 1958 as a Democrat to the 85th United States Congress, by special election, January 21, 1958, to fill the vacancy caused by the death of Augustine Kelley, and was reelected to the ten succeeding Congresses. He was not a candidate for reelection in 1978.

U.S. House of Representatives
Preceded by Augustine Kelley	Member of the U.S. House of Representatives from Pennsylvania's 21st congressional district 1958–1979	Succeeded by Don Bailey
Pennsylvania State Senate
Preceded by Benjamin Thompson	Member of the Pennsylvania Senate for the 39th District; 1937 – 1958	Succeeded by Paul Mahady
Party political offices
Preceded by John Rice	Democratic Leader of the Pennsylvania Senate; 1939–1958	Succeeded by Charles Weiner
Preceded by Elmer Kilroy	Democratic nominee for Lieutenant Governor of Pennsylvania; 1946	Succeeded by Michael Musmanno
