= Albert Pechan =

American politician

Albert R. Pechan

Member of the Pennsylvania Senate from the 41st district
- In office January 1949 – September 11, 1969
- Preceded by: Jacob W. Carr
- Succeeded by: Patrick J. Stapleton, Jr.
- Constituency: Parts of Armstrong, Butler, Jefferson, Indiana, and Clarion Counties

Personal details
- Born: May 13, 1902 Ford City, Pennsylvania
- Died: September 11, 1969 (aged 67) Ford City, Pennsylvania
- Education: University of Pittsburgh School of Dental Medicine

Albert R. Pechan (May 13, 1902 – September 11, 1969) is a former member of the Pennsylvania State Senate who served from 1949 to 1969. He served as Senate majority whip from 1955 until his death in 1969.

He graduated from the University of Pittsburgh School of Dental Medicine in 1928. Served in the US Army during World War II. Where he was a lieutenant colonel, in the Army Reserves.
