= Katelyn Pippy =

American actress

- Born: Katelyn Mary Pippy; April 12, 1993 (age 33); Fort Hood, Texas, U.S.
- Education: Cornell University, BA (2015)
- Occupations: Actress, producer, production manager
- Years active: 2005–present
Ice hockey career
- Height: 5 ft 10 in (178 cm)
- Weight: 141 lb (64 kg; 10 st 1 lb)
- Position: Goaltender
- Caught: Left
- Played for: Cornell Big Red
- Playing career: 2011–2013

Katelyn Pippy (born April 12, 1993) is an American actress, producer, and production manager, best known for her role as Emmalin Holden on the Lifetime television drama Army Wives.

== Career ==
The role of Emmalin Holden on Army Wives, was played by Caroline Pires in season one but filled by Pippy prior to season two following the death of Emmalin's older sister, Amanda (played by Kim Allen), in a bar bombing. In seasons three and four, Pippy was a member of the cast member, contracted to appear in a minimum of ten episodes per thirteen-episodes produced. Pippy balanced the February-to-August shooting schedule in Charleston, South Carolina, with her high school education by keeping up with class work online and managed to keep playing ice hockey at an elite level by flying wherever her team was scheduled to play on weekends. After enrolling at Cornell University in 2011, she reduced her episode commitment in order to focus on her studies, continuing in role as a guest star for the remaining three seasons. Emmalin, like Pippy, also played ice hockey at college.

She was most recently cast in Azi Rahman's feature directorial debut Whisper, a “dark ode to modern love and Los Angeles.”

== Personal life ==
Pippy was born on April 12, 1993, at Fort Hood, Texas, where her father served on active duty with the 1st Cavalry Division of the United States Army. She is the daughter of former political operative and lobbyist Kathy Pippy and politician John Pippy, a member of the Pennsylvania State Senate from 2003 to 2012. Her paternal grandmother, Pensri, is Thai.

Pippy's hometown is Moon Township, Pennsylvania, and she is a graduate of Lincoln Park Performing Arts Charter School in Midland, Pennsylvania. She enrolled at Cornell University in 2011 and graduated with a Bachelor of Arts in Theater in 2015.

== Filmography ==
Year	Title	Role	Notes
2005	Monk	Young Sherry	TV series, episode: "Mr. Monk and Little Monk"
2006	Maybe It's In the Water	Margine	Short film
2006	The Suite Life of Zack & Cody	Jolie	TV series, episode: "French 101"
2007	Alibi	Young Christie Winters	TV movie
2007	Small Avalanches	Nancy	Short film
2007	The Haunting Hour: Don't Think About It	Erin	Direct-to-video movie
2008– 2013	Army Wives	Emmalin Holden	TV series, recurring character (season 2); main cast (seasons 3 & 4); guest star (seasons 5–7)
2016	#ThisIsCollege	Amanda	Web mini-series; 2 episodes
2017	A Denied Dream	Alice	Short film
2018	Fallout 76	Rita Wilcox, Hayley Porter, Poseidon Mainframe	Video game (voice)
2018	Rage 2	Glisten Success, Gunbarrel Guard, Immortal Shrouded Convoy Leader, Authority Crusher	Video game (voice)
2020	Date of Honor	Beck Von Sant	TV series; 8 episodes (Facebook Watch)
2021	9-1-1: Lone Star	Kelsey	TV Series, episode: "Friends With Benefits"
2022	No Way Out	Sammy	Movie

== Ice hockey career ==
Pippy played ice hockey as a goaltender in the Tier 1 Elite Hockey League (T1EHL) with the Pittsburgh Jr. Penguins, on the under-16 (U16) team in the 2008–09 and 2009–10 seasons, and with the under-19 (U19) team in the 2010–11 season. She participated in several USA Hockey National Selection Camps in the summer of 2011.

In fall 2011, she joined the Cornell Big Red women's ice hockey program as the third goaltender, backing up more seasoned netminders Amanda Mazzotta and Lauren Slebodnick. The 2011–12 Cornell Big Red roster featured a significant number of top Canadian and American talents, including forwards Jessica Campbell, Emily Fulton, Brianne Jenner, Rebecca Johnston, Jill Saulnier, Catherine White, and defencemen Laura Fortino, Alyssa Gagliardi, and Lauriane Rougeau. The 2012–13 season saw Pippy's first NCAA start, a shutout against Colgate on November 17.

=== Regular season and playoff statistics ===
			Regular season							Playoffs
Season	Team	League	GP	W	L	TOI	GA	SO	GAA	GP	GAA
2008–09	Pittsburgh Jr. Penguins	T1EHL U16	12						1.83	–	–
2009–10	Pittsburgh Jr. Penguins	T1EHL U16	11						1.60	2	1.00
2010–11	Pittsburgh Jr. Penguins	T1EHL U19	9						2.00	2	2.00
2011–12	Cornell Big Red	NCAA	1	0	0	10:39	0	0	0.00	–	–
2012–13	Cornell Big Red	NCAA	3	3	0	153:30	2	1	0.78	–	–
NCAA totals			4	3	0	164:09	2	1	0.73	–	–
