= Senator Hooper =

Senator Hooper may refer to:

- Ed Hooper (politician) (born 1947), Florida State Senate
- J. Robert Hooper (1936–2008), Maryland State Senate
- Samuel Hooper (1808–1875), Massachusetts State Senate

== See also ==
- Senator Hopper (disambiguation)
