= Patrick J. Stapleton Jr. =

American politician

Patrick James Stapleton

Member of the Pennsylvania Senate from the 41st district
- In office June 8, 1970 – November 30, 2000
- Preceded by: Albert R. Pechan
- Succeeded by: Donald C. White

Personal details
- Born: January 7, 1924 Indiana, Pennsylvania
- Died: March 13, 2001 (aged 77) Pittsburgh, Pennsylvania
- Party: Democratic
- Spouse: Madeline Feidler
- Children: Patrick J. Stapleton III
- Education: Indiana University of Pennsylvania

Military service
- Allegiance: United States
- Branch/service: U.S. Navy
- Years of service: 1943-47

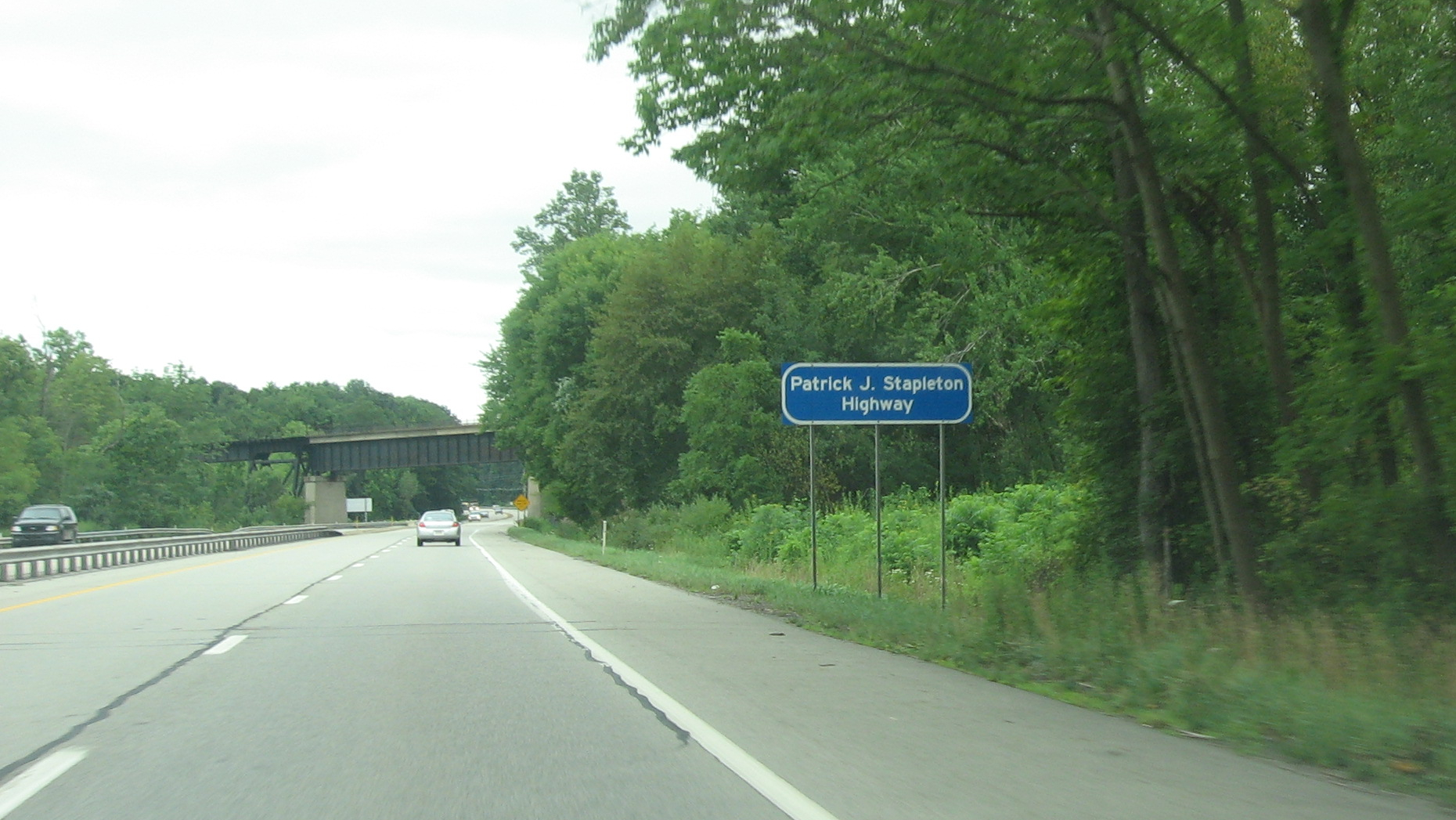
The Patrick J. Stapleton Highway, on U.S. Route 119 in Pennsylvania, just north of Homer City, Pennsylvania.

Patrick J. Stapleton (January 7, 1924 – March 13, 2001) was a Democratic member of the Pennsylvania State Senate.

== Life ==
Stapleton, a native of Indiana, Pennsylvania, served in the U.S. Navy during World War II. He graduated from Indiana State Teachers College, now known as Indiana University of Pennsylvania, in 1949.

He was sworn in as a Pennsylvania State Senator for the 41st senatorial district on June 8, 1970. He would become known as a "fixture in the state Senate." He served as a leader in the Democratic Caucus as Policy Committee Chairman from 1983 through 1996 and as Caucus Administrator beginning in 1997.

Stapleton retired prior to the 2000 election, supporting the eventual Democratic nominee, Jim McQuown in the "wide-open race" to succeed him. However, McQuown lost to Donald C. White 54–46 in the general election. He died in 2001.

== Legacy ==
The Patrick J. Stapleton Jr. Library at the Indiana University of Pennsylvania is named after him.

His son, Patrick, is a member of the State Liquor Control Board.
