= Eugene Porterfield =

American politician, businessman

Eugene 'Gene' E. Porterfield
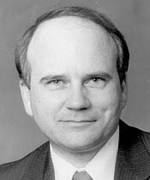
- Senator Porterfield in 2000

Member of the Pennsylvania Senate from the 39th district
- In office January 3, 1989 – November 30, 1996
- Preceded by: James Kelley
- Succeeded by: Allen Kukovich

Personal details
- Born: November 3, 1946 (age 79) Connellsville, Pennsylvania
- Party: Democrat, Republican
- Spouse: Cindy Porterfield (née Payne)
- Children: Todd, Lisa, Beth, Camdon
- Parents: Ellsworth Franklin Porterfield (father); Ellen Gertrude Miner (mother)
- Relatives: Daniel Porterfield
- Education: Connellsville High School, Westmoreland County Community College
- Occupation: President, Certified Pennsylvania Evaluator (CPE), Evaluator Services and Technology

Eugene Ellsworth Porterfield (born November 3, 1946) is a former member of the Pennsylvania State Senate, serving from 1989 to 1996. He is also a businessman.

== Early life ==
Eugene "Gene" Porterfield was born in Connellsville, Pennsylvania (Fayette County) on November 3, 1946. One of two children, Porterfield attended various public school systems in southwestern PA, and graduated Connellsville High School in 1964.

During high school, he worked numerous jobs, including a bowling alley and as a gas station attendant and mechanic. He then continued his work as a mechanic, an auto parts sales specialist and factory worker before enlisting in the U.S. Army.

== Military service ==
Porterfield was stationed with the 99th Army Reserve Command (ARCOM), but never saw action in the Vietnam War. He served with B Company March, 1966–1969 to rank as Seargeant. 1969 he enlisted to OCS, Ft. Benning, GA. Returned to 99th ARCOM August, 1969-1972 2nd Lt. with A Company. In the last year of his service, he served with the Brownsville NCO Training Company. He was honorably discharged, as a commissioned officer, in August 1972.

== Politics ==
After his discharge from active military service, Porterfield started a professional career as a real estate appraiser. He later acquired the Certified Pennsylvania Evaluator (CPE) license. He moved to Greensburg in 1979. He married Cindy Payne of Latrobe, Pennsylvania, in 1988 and he ran for the Pennsylvania State Senate's 39th District as a Democrat. He faced the Honorable James Kelley (D) in the primary and won by a small margin. In the fall of 1988, Porterfield defeated Robert Keibler (R) to secure the senate seat. He supported former Pittsburgh Pirates legend Bill Mazeroski in his unsuccessful campaign for Westmoreland County Commissioner in 1987.

He took office in 1989. His district encompasses Westmoreland County, Pennsylvania and southern parts of Indiana County, Pennsylvania. He was hailed by local unions for his hard-line fight on jobs in the local economy. He became close friends with Governor Bob Casey, Sr. during his time in office, and made a large effort to work across party lines to accomplish tasks for his constituents. His chaired the Pennsylvania Game Commission and co-sponsored the Pennsylvania version of child car restraint bill, called the Pennsylvania Child Passenger Protection Act. He is also directly credited for bringing in the now-defunct Sony plant to New Stanton, Pennsylvania, and securing key construction grants for the University of Pittsburgh at Greensburg and the Arnold Palmer Regional Airport.

In 1991, during the Gulf War, on a base in Kuwait housing the regiment in which he served in the U.S. Army Reserves, the 14th Quartermaster Detachment, was struck by an enemy SCUD missile, killing 13 soldiers belonging to the detachment. Porterfield attended the ceremony held for the victims, and spoke a few words of comfort.

He was re-elected in 1992, beating Mike Smith (R) by nearly 12%. When rumblings of Porterfield's possible gubernatorial ambitions became more prevalent, he and his wife were selected as delegates to the 1992 Democratic National Convention. While there, they met President Bill Clinton, Hillary Clinton and Al Gore, and rode in Gore's limousine to LaGuardia International Airport after the convention. From that point forward, Porterfield's senate career began to fade. The emergence of serious personal attacks against him, and the hard challenge he faced from Allen Kukovich in the 1996 Democratic Primary, ended Porterfield's campaign for the Senate.

In 1999, Porterfield was pressed by his former staff members to take down Kukovich to reclaim his former seat. In an unexpected move, however, he not only announced his intentions on running, but he switched his party affiliation to Republican. Porterfield continued campaigning and raising money throughout the year 2000. The election turned quite ugly, as Kukovich slammed Porterfield on numerous issues, from jobs to "flip-flopping" his positions on issues. Porterfield likely hurt himself by claiming that he wanted to focus on the beliefs and values, refusing to attack Kukovich openly on the issues because he wanted to run a clean campaign. That November, Kukovich steamrolled Porterfield by nearly 14,000 votes (15%).

Porterfield walked away from politics until 2003, when he ran for the Westmoreland County (Pa) Board of Commissioners. In the Republican primary, Porterfield received almost twice the number of votes of his main challenger, Terry Marolt. The almost-certain re-election of Democrats Tom Balya and Tom Ceraso meant only one spot was available, and intense in-fighting developed. With three days remaining until the election and seeing his poll numbers still below Porterfield's, Marolt alleged that because Porterfield was an appraiser, he would raise property taxes significantly. Marolt's plan gave him around 3,000 more votes than Porterfield on election day. Though James Gebicki (I) likely took many potential votes away from the Republicans, Porterfield filed a lawsuit against the sponsors of the scheme. A private investigation revealed that it was libelous and slanderous, but when the judge asked if Porterfield would like him to charge the men involved, he responded "I don't want their money; I just want the truth to come out." Since then, Porterfield has left politics to focus on his business and family. However, he counsels politicians who ask for advice.

== Business and personal life ==
Porterfield works for Evaluator Services and Technology out of Greensburg, Pennsylvania. He is the president of the company, which writes software for mass appraisals of property in counties they're contracted to. He has over 45 years of experience in this particular field, in which he started out as a data collector of real estate in 1968.

Porterfield is married to Cindy. They have one son. He also has three children from a previous marriage.
