= George N. Wade =

American politician

Member of the Pennsylvania Senate from the 31st district
- In office January 7, 1941 – January 9, 1974
- Preceded by: Robert Lee Jacobs
- Succeeded by: Robert L. Myers

Member of the Pennsylvania House of Representatives from the Cumberland County district
- In office 1931–1934

Personal details
- Born: August 13, 1893 Emlenton, Pennsylvania, U.S.
- Died: January 9, 1974 (aged 80)

George N. Wade (August 13, 1893 – January 9, 1974) was a former member of the Pennsylvania State Senate, serving from 1941 to 1974. He also served in the Pennsylvania House of Representatives.

The George N. Wade Memorial Bridge in Harrisburg, Pennsylvania, is named after him.

== Biography ==
Wade was born in Emlenton, Venango County, Pennsylvania, on August 13, 1893.

He served in the United States Army during World War I, and later worked as a farmer and a coal miner prior to his election, as a Republican, to the Pennsylvania House of Representatives. He served in Congress during its 1931 and 1933 terms, but was not a candidate for reelection for the 1935 term.

Instead, he was elected to the Camp Hill borough council, then elected to the Camp Hill school board, and became the Eastern Manager for Ohio National Life Insurance Co.

Wade would go on to hold the following positions: elected, Pennsylvania State Senate (1941-1974); appointed Joint State Government Commission Sub-Committee on Cooperatives (1945-1946); appointed, Joint State Government Commission Sub-Committee on State-Local Highway Financing (1945-1948); appointed, Joint Legislative Committee on the Susquehanna River Fishways (1947-1948); appointed, Joint Legislative Committee on Group Insurance (1947-1948); appointed, chair, Joint Legislative Committee on Retirement System and Laws (1947-1948).

== Death ==
Wade died on January 9, 1974, while still a serving member of the Pennsylvania State Senate.
