= John N. Scales =

American politician (born 1932)

Member of the Pennsylvania Senate from the 39th district
- In office January 4, 1973 – February 4, 1974
- Preceded by: Paul Mahady
- Succeeded by: James Kelley
- Constituency: Parts of Westmoreland County

Chair of the Pennsylvania Democratic Party
- In office June 23, 1970 – June 23, 1972
- Preceded by: Thomas Z. Minehart
- Succeeded by: Dennis "Harvey" Thiemann

Personal details
- Born: December 3, 1932 (age 93) Trafford, Pennsylvania, U.S.
- Education: Yale University (A.B.); Harvard Law School (LL.B.)

John Neil Scales (born December 3, 1932) is a former member of the Pennsylvania State Senate, serving from 1973 to 1974.

== Biography ==
An alumnus of Yale University and Harvard Law School, he was the college roommate of Dick Thornburgh, an eventual Pennsylvania Governor and United States Attorney General.

Prior to his time in the Senate, Scales served as the district attorney for Westmoreland County, Pennsylvania from 1969 to 1972 and as the assistant district attorney from 1966 to 1969. From 1970 to 1972, he was the chairman of the Pennsylvania Democratic Party.

He was also elected as a delegate to the Pennsylvania Constitutional Convention in 1967.

Scales served on the Yale Board of Governors and in 2011 was awarded the Yale Medal, the school's highest honor for service to the university. He turned 90 in 2022.
