= Montgomery Township, Indiana County, Pennsylvania =

Township in Pennsylvania, US

Coordinates: 40°47′00″N 78°53′00″W

- Township
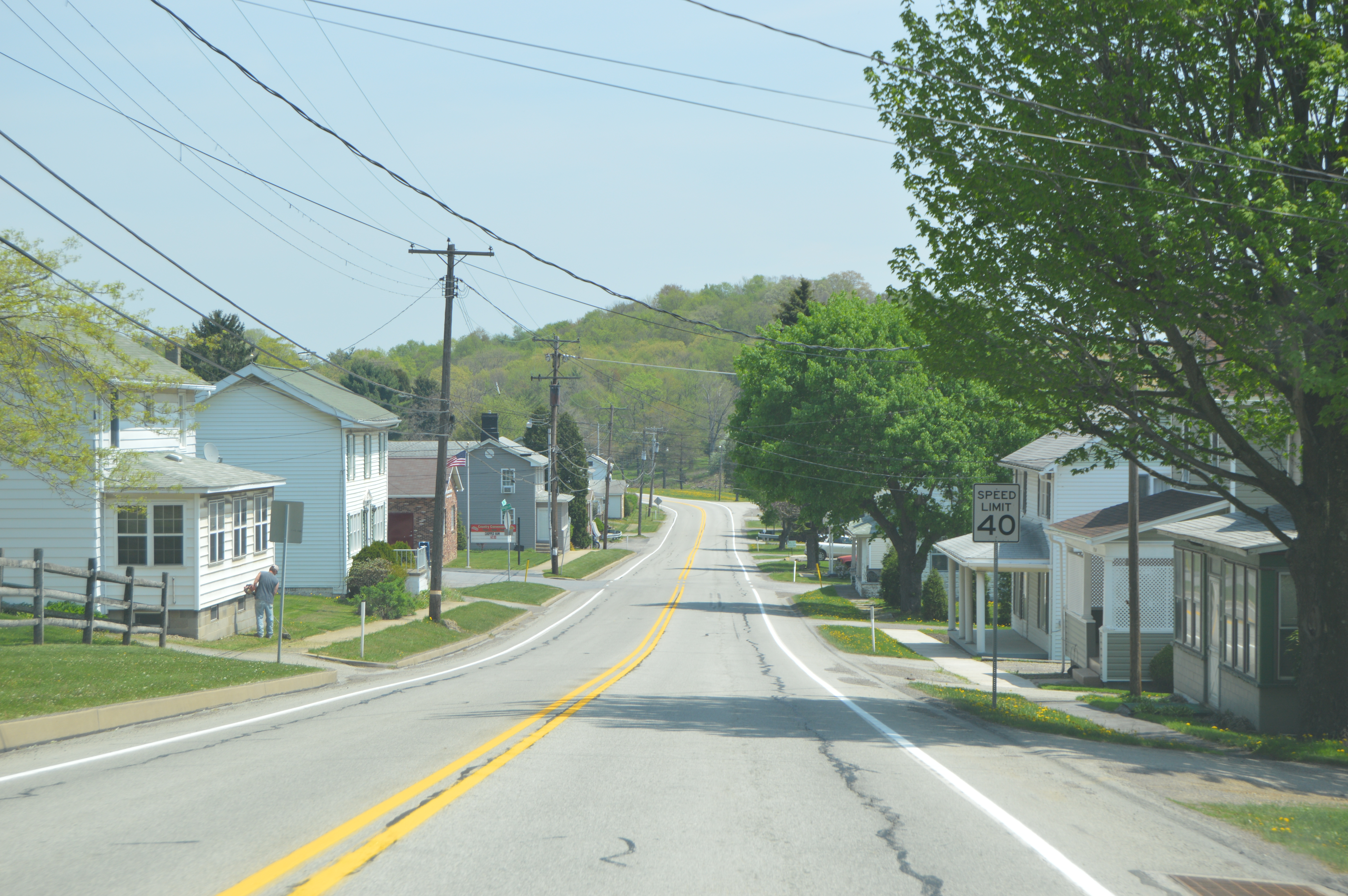
- Pennsylvania Route 286 in Hillsdale

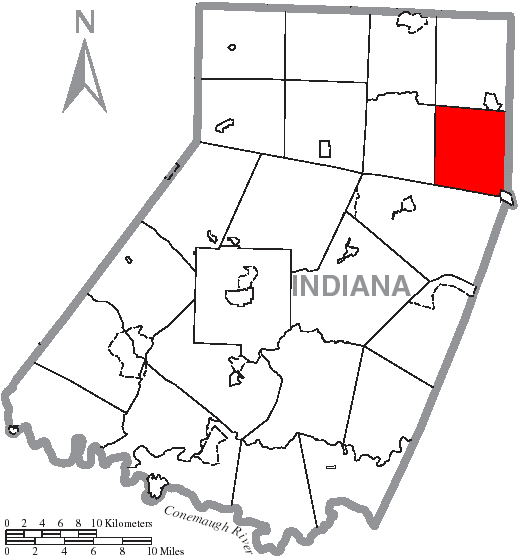
- Map of Indiana County, Pennsylvania Highlighting Montgomery Township

- Map of Pennsylvania highlighting Indiana County
- Country: United States
- State: Pennsylvania
- County: Indiana

Area
  - Total: 28.72 sq mi (74.39 km^{2})
  - Land: 28.66 sq mi (74.22 km^{2})
  - Water: 0.066 sq mi (0.17 km^{2})

Population (2020)
  - Total: 1,439 ▼
  - Estimate (2021): 1,434
  - Density: 52/sq mi (20.1/km^{2})
- Time zone: UTC-5 (Eastern (EST))
  - Summer (DST): UTC-4 (EDT)
- FIPS code: 42-063-50624
- Website: https://montgomerytownship.net/

Montgomery Township is a township that is located in Indiana County, Pennsylvania, United States. The population was 1,439 at the time of the 2020 census, a decline from the figure of 1,568 tabulated in 2010.

== History ==
This township was named in honor of John Montgomery, an early settler of Conemaugh Township and a noted Revolutionary War veteran who owned a large tract of land in present Montgomery County. It includes the communities of Arcadia, Bowdertown, Cush Creek, Gipsy, Gorman Summit, Hillsdale (previously called Gettysburg), Hooverhurst, Lower Wilgus, and Upper Wilgus.

== Geography ==
According to the United States Census Bureau, the township has a total area of 28.7 square miles (74.3 km^{2}), of which 28.7 square miles (74.2 km^{2}) is land and 0.04 square miles (0.1 km^{2}) (0.14%) is water.

== Demographics ==
Historical population
| Census | Pop. | Note | %± |
|---|---|---|---|
| 1850 | 751 | | — |
| 1860 | 1,423 | | 89.5% |
| 1870 | 932 | | −34.5% |
| 1880 | 1,211 | | 29.9% |
| 1890 | 1,111 | | −8.3% |
| 1900 | 1,299 | | 16.9% |
| 1910 | 3,382 | | 160.4% |
| 1920 | 3,039 | | −10.1% |
| 1930 | 2,142 | | −29.5% |
| 1940 | 2,305 | | 7.6% |
| 1950 | 1,958 | | −15.1% |
| 1960 | 1,633 | | −16.6% |
| 1970 | 1,518 | | −7.0% |
| 1980 | 1,813 | | 19.4% |
| 1990 | 1,729 | | −4.6% |
| 2000 | 1,706 | | −1.3% |
| 2010 | 1,568 | | −8.1% |
| 2020 | 1,439 | | −8.2% |
| 2021 (est.) | 1,434 | | −0.3% |
U.S. Decennial Census

As of the census of 2000, there were 1,706 people, 608 households, and 460 families residing in the township.

The population density was 59.5 inhabitants per square mile (23.0/km^{2}). There were 701 housing units at an average density of 24.5/sq mi (9.4/km^{2}).

The racial makeup of the township was 99.00% White, 0.12% African American, 0.12% Native American, and 0.76% from two or more races. Hispanic or Latino of any race were 0.29% of the population.

There were 608 households, out of which 34.9% had children under the age of eighteen living with them; 61.5% were married couples living together, 9.4% had a female householder with no husband present, and 24.3% were non-families. 21.4% of all households were made up of individuals, and 12.2% had someone living alone who was sixty-five years of age or older.

The average household size was 2.64 and the average family size was 3.05.

Within the township, the population was spread out, with 24.8% of residents who were under the age of eighteen, 6.1% who were aged eighteen to twenty-four, 27.6% who were aged twenty-five to forty-four, 24.3% who were aged forty-five to sixty-four, and 17.2% who were sixty-five years of age or older. The median age was forty years.

For every one hundred females there were 90.6 males. For every one hundred females who were aged eighteen or older, there were 89.5 males.

The median income for a household in the township was $27,298, and the median income for a family was $31,786. Males had a median income of $26,033 compared with that of $19,500 for females.

The per capita income for the township was $12,015.

Approximately 17.6% of families and 19.6% of the population were living below the poverty line, including 24.9% of those who were under the age of eighteen and 20.3% of those who were aged sixty-five or older.
