= Arcadia, Pennsylvania =

Unincorporated community in Pennsylvania, US

- Unincorporated community
- Location within Pennsylvania Location within the United States
- Coordinates: 40°46′52″N 78°51′09″W
- Country: United States
- State: Pennsylvania
- County: Indiana
- Township: Montgomery
- Elevation: 1,499 ft (457 m)
- Time zone: UTC-5 (Eastern (EST))
  - Summer (DST): UTC-4 (EDT)
- ZIP code: 15712
- Area code: 724
- GNIS feature ID: 1192078

Arcadia is an unincorporated community in Indiana County, in the U.S. state of Pennsylvania.

== History ==
Arcadia was founded around 1900 as a coal town. A post office was established in Arcadia in 1902.
