= John Laudadio =

American politician

John F. Laudadio, Sr.

Member of the Pennsylvania House of Representatives from the 56th district
- In office 1969 – June 6, 1977
- Preceded by: District created
- Succeeded by: Allen Kukovich

Member of the Pennsylvania House of Representatives from the Westmoreland County district
- In office 1963–1968

Personal details
- Born: December 26, 1916
- Died: June 6, 1977 (aged 60)
- Party: Democratic

John F. Laudadio, Sr. (December 26, 1916 – June 6, 1977) was a Democratic member of the Pennsylvania House of Representatives.
