= Thomas Kutz =

American politician

Member of the Pennsylvania House of Representatives from the 87th district
- Incumbent
- Assumed office January 3, 2023
- Preceded by: Greg Rothman

Personal details
- Born: 1994 (age 31–32) Pennsylvania, U.S.
- Party: Republican
- Spouse: Allie (m. 2022)
- Education: Grove City College (B.A.); Widener University Commonwealth Law School (J.D.)
- Alma mater: Cedar Cliff High School
- Website: repkutz.com

Thomas Holden Kutz (born 1994) is an American politician and attorney who currently represents the 87th District in the Pennsylvania House of Representatives as a Republican since 2023.

== Early life and education ==
Kutz was born in Pennsylvania, and grew up in the Mechanicsburg area. He graduated from Cedar Cliff High School in 2013, and later graduated magna cum laude with a Bachelor of Arts degree in political science from Grove City College in 2016. Kutz earned his Juris doctor degree from Widener University Commonwealth Law School in 2022.

== Political career ==
After graduating from college, Kutz worked as an aide for the U.S. House Ways and Means Committee. Following law school, he worked as a policy director for the Republican caucus in the Pennsylvania Senate.

In 2019, Kutz was elected to the Lower Allen Township Board of Commissioners.

In March 2022, Kutz announced he would seek the Republican nomination to represent the 87th District in the Pennsylvania House of Representatives. The seat was open after incumbent Greg Rothman chose to seek election to the Pennsylvania Senate. Running on a platform of fiscal conservatism, Kutz won the Republican primary election against businessman Eric Clancy, and later defeated Democrat Kristal Markle in the general election.

In 2024, Rep. Kutz proved successful in his re-election bid. He defeated Democrat John Flood by nearly 25 points.

In October 2023, Thomas Kutz received a unanimous vote to succeed Jenna Geesey as Chair of the Pennsylvania Young Republicans. He served as the Chair of the Cumberland County Young Republicans and Co-Chair of the PAYR prior to this.

Kutz currently sits on the State House's Appropriations Committee, Housing & Community Development Committee, and Insurance Committee.

== Personal life ==
Kutz married his wife Allie on September 17, 2022. The couple currently live in Lower Allen Township in Cumberland County, Pennsylvania.

== Electoral history ==
2019 Lower Allen Township Board of Commissioners Republican primary election
Party	Candidate	Votes	%
Republican	Thomas Kutz	1,154	31.78
Republican	Carolyn Holtzman	714	19.66
Republican	H. Edward Black	707	19.47
Republican	David M. Murdoch	516	14.21
Republican	Robert J. Hoobler	284	7.82
Republican	Jack R. Simpson	242	6.66
Write-in		14	0.39
Total votes		3,631	100.00

2019 Lower Allen Township Board of Commissioners Democratic primary election
Party	Candidate	Votes	%
Democratic	John A. Freidhoff	683	85.38
Write-in	Thomas Kutz	20	2.50
Write-in	Carolyn Holtzman	11	1.38
	Other write-ins	86	10.75
Total votes		800	100.00

2019 Lower Allen Township Board of Commissioners election
Party	Candidate	Votes	%
Democratic/Republican	Thomas Kutz	2,992	30.87
Democratic/Republican	Carolyn Holtzman	2,878	29.70
Republican	H. Edward Black	2,127	21.95
Democratic	John A. Freidhoff	1,673	17.26
Write-in		21	0.22
Total votes		9,691	100.00

2022 Pennsylvania House of Representatives Republican primary election, District 87
Party	Candidate	Votes	%
Republican	Thomas Kutz	5,762	53.83
Republican	Eric Clancy	4,905	45.82
Write-in		38	0.35
Total votes		10,705	100.00

2022 Pennsylvania House of Representatives election, District 87
Party	Candidate	Votes	%
Republican	Thomas Kutz	18,878	58.20
Democratic	Kristal Markle	13,510	41.65
Write-in		48	0.15
Total votes		32,436	100.00

2024 Pennsylvania House of Representatives election, District 87
Party	Candidate	Votes	%
Republican	Thomas Kutz (incumbent)	24,861	61.58
Democratic	John Flood	15,440	38.24
Write-in		72	0.18
Total votes		40,373	100.00

== Sources ==
- "SUMMARY REPT-GROUP DETAIL STATISTICS REPORT-EL45A" (PDF). Cumberland County, Pennsylvania. May 28, 2019a.
