= Brian Rasel =

American politician from Pennsylvania

Member of the Pennsylvania House of Representatives from the 56th district
- Incumbent
- Assumed office January 7, 2025
- Preceded by: George Dunbar

Personal details
- Party: Republican
- Spouse: Caitlyn
- Children: 3
- Education: Pennsylvania Western University, California
- Website: reprasel.com

Brian C. Rasel is an American politician who represents the 56th district of the Pennsylvania House of Representatives as a Republican since 2024. He previously worked as chief of staff for his predecessor George Dunbar.
