= Paul Mahady =

American politician

Paul William Mahady

Member of the Pennsylvania Senate from the 39th district
- In office January 6, 1959 – November 30, 1972
- Preceded by: John Dent
- Succeeded by: John Scales
- Constituency: Parts of Westmoreland County

Personal details
- Born: November 19, 1908 Latrobe, Pennsylvania
- Died: October 7, 1973 (aged 64) Latrobe, Pennsylvania
- Spouse: Janet K. Matlock
- Education: Harvard

Paul William Mahady (November 19, 1908 – October 7, 1973) was a former member of the Pennsylvania State Senate, serving from 1959 to 1972. He was a member of the Harvard Crimson men's basketball program before graduating undergrad in 1930.
