= Bob Regola =

American politician

Robert T. Regola

Member of the Pennsylvania Senate from the 39th district
- In office January 4, 2005 – November 30, 2008
- Preceded by: Allen Kukovich
- Succeeded by: Kim Ward

Personal details
- Party: Republican
- Spouse: Janette
- Children: 3
- Education: Pennsylvania State University (BS)
- Profession: Professional surveyor

Robert T. Regola is an American Republican politician, and former member of the Pennsylvania State Senate. Regola represented the 39th District from 2005 to 2009. He previously served as chairman of the Board of Supervisors for Hempfield Township, Pennsylvania. Prior to elected office, he worked as a professional surveyor.

== Political career ==
=== 2004 election ===
Regola's successful 2004 campaign against incumbent State Senator Allen Kukovich was considered one of the closest and nastiest in the state. Kukovich's campaign was sued by the Pittsburgh Tribune Review for allegedly misusing the paper's name in campaign advertisements. The suit was dismissed on Election Day by Westmoreland County Judge William J. Ober. Regola's campaign claimed that Kukovich had campaigned in gay bars in Philadelphia with then-Governor Ed Rendell in 2003, a charge denied by Kukovich and his supporters.

=== 2008 election ===
Regola removed himself from consideration for re-election on August 11, 2008, citing what he characterized as "unfair" media coverage of his acquittal on perjury and gun charges related to the suicide of a teenage neighbor. The Republican Party of Westmoreland County chose Westmoreland County Commissioner Kim Ward as the candidate, who then defeated Democratic candidate Tony Bompiani in the General Election.

Pennsylvania State Senate
Preceded by Allen Kukovich	Member of the Pennsylvania State Senate from the 39th district 2005–2008	Succeeded by Kim Ward
