= James Kelley (Pennsylvania state senator) =

American politician (1932/33–2023)

James R. Kelley

Member of the Pennsylvania Senate from the 39th district
- In office June 17, 1974 – November 30, 1988
- Preceded by: John Scales
- Succeeded by: Eugene Porterfield

Personal details
- Born: James Reeves Kelley; 1932 or 1933
- Died: November 1, 2023 (aged 90–91)

James Reeves Kelley was a judge of the Pennsylvania Commonwealth Court. He was a Democratic member of the Pennsylvania State Senate from 1974 to 1988.

He attended St. Vincent College and the Columbus School of Law at Catholic University of America. He was a County Commissioner in Westmoreland County from 1968 to 1974. He was a Pennsylvania State Senator from 1974 to 1988. He was appointed to be a judge of the Commonwealth Court of Pennsylvania in 1990 and was elected to a full term in 1991. He died November 1, 2023.
