= Pennsylvania Public School Employees' Retirement System =

- Founded: July 18, 1917
- Headquarters: 5 North 5th Street; Harrisburg, Pennsylvania
- Key people: Terrill (Terri) J. Sancez, Executive Director; Benjamin L. Cotton, Chief Investment Officer
- Total assets: $72.8 billion (June 30, 2023)
- Website: https://www.psers.pa.gov

The Public School Employees’ Retirement System (PSERS) is a pension fund for public school employees in the Commonwealth of Pennsylvania. Eligible members include all full-time public school employees, part-time hourly public school employees who render at least 500 hours of service in the school year, and part-time per diem public school employees who render at least 80 days of service in the school year in any of the 770 reporting entities in Pennsylvania.

As of June 30, 2023, the System had nearly 251,000 active, 250,000 retired, and 27,000 vested inactive members, with an estimated annual active payroll of $15.3 billion. The annuitant membership as of June 30, 2023 is over 250,000 retirees and beneficiaries who receive over $552 million in pension and healthcare benefits each month. The average yearly benefit paid to annuitants is $26,197.

Under the Internal Revenue Service (IRS) Code, the PSERS pension plan is classified as a 401(a), governmental defined benefit plan. A defined benefit plan means that your retirement benefit is determined by a formula which includes a retirement factor, years of credited service, and the final average salary. PSERS’ role expanded upon the passage of Act 5 of 2017 to include oversight of two new classes consisting of defined benefit (DB) and defined contribution (DC) components and a stand-alone DC class.

== History ==
PSERS was established on July 18, 1917, and officially began operations on July 1, 1919, to provide retirement benefits to public school employees of the Commonwealth of Pennsylvania.

== Investments ==
As of June 30, 2023, the fund holds $72.8 billion in assets.

In a 2018 report, the bi-partisan Pennsylvania Public Pension Management and Asset Investment Review Commission found that the fund under-performs because it holds poorly performing, private "alternative investments" that command high investment fees. When compared with other state funds ranked by investment returns, PSERS ranked 50 out of 52.

In September 2021 the PSERS board voted to reject two "alternative investments" proposed by Chief Investment Officer James H. Grossman. In a 8–7 vote, the board denied a $235 million investment into ICG Europe Fund VIII and $100 million into LEM Multifamily Fund VI. This was the first time the board has voted to reject high-fee alternative investments. Voting against these investments were PSERS board members Muth, Mains, Torsella, Garrity, Vague, Ryan, Bradford and Ortega. Voting in favor were Davis, Volger, Beck, SantaMaria, Lemmo, Browne, and DiTullio.

After years of disagreements among board members about the fund's investments in hedge funds, private equity and "alternative investments", board members agreed by a voice vote during the October 2021 board meeting to sell its holdings of hedge funds and instead invest in U.S. stocks. The board will vote on a detailed proposal at its December 2021 meeting.

=== Fees ===
In 2020 the fund reported paying substantial fees to private fund managers since 1980, amounting to $5 billion in fees and expenditures and $5.1 billion paid in previously unreported performance fees or "carried interest."

The fund has been criticized for its high-fee and private equity investments. It spent $740 million in calendar 2019 on money managers alone; $293 million in fees and expenses plus $448 million in "carried interest."

The FY 2020 Investment Expenses Report shows "Total Investment Expenses: FY 2014 – FY 2020" on page 8, and "Private Equity, Private Credit, & Private Real Estate Management Fees, Carried Interest, & Other Expenses" for calendar 2018 and 2019 on page 5. Neither table appears to include all investment expenses. The calendar-year expenses ($741 million for CY 2019; $729 million for CY 2018) are consistently higher than the fiscal-year expenses ($515 million for FY 2020; $450 million for FY 2019), apparently because the calendar year table includes substantial "carried interest" from private equity investments that is not included in the fiscal year table, which reports private equity "profit sharing" of zero on page 7. Conversely, the fiscal year table includes public investment types that are not included in the calendar year table, which explicitly includes only private investment types. The $515 million in fees shown for FY 2020 on pages 7 and 8, which apparently excludes private equity carried interest, matches the total investment expenses reported in the FY2020 annual report, pages 44 and 82.

=== Holdings ===
==== Alternative Investments ====
In 2008 the fund began investing in alternative investments, which are riskier investments outside the traditional stock market that often carry high fees. As of May 2021, 51% of the fund was invested in alternative investments. In 2018 the fund increased its investment in a trailer-park venture owned by Stockbridge Capital Group, citing "its demonstrated track record of increasing home rental rates." It also invested in a prisoner phone use service owned by Platinum Equity. In 2016 it invested in an asset owned by Glencore called "Oilflow SPV 1 DAC." With this financial vehicle, Glencore wanted to make loans to Kurdistan in Iraq, backed by oil in the region. In September 2018 an announcement was filed with the Cayman Islands Stock Exchange claiming that the oil exports of the Kurdistan Regional Government had fallen by 50% after the Iraqi Army took over the Kirkuk oil fields.

As of June 2021, 63% of the fund is invested in alternative investments.

==== Real Estate ====
The fund has put about 10% of its money into real estate. In fiscal year 2014 it directly owned at least $286 million in real estate. It has owned farm land and commercial fruit farms in Florida, Washington and California and apartments and gated communities in Florida. It bought the Atlanta Airport Marriott hotel in 1987 and The Galleria at Fort Lauderdale for $125 million in 1993.

It has spent $13.5 million acquiring properties near to its Harrisburg headquarters since 2017. The fund spent $1.6 million acquiring the former Patriot-News newsroom and printing plant from Alden Global Capital, which had acquired the properties for $644,000 only six months prior.

PSERS owns part of Yes! Communities, a real estate management company that owns over 200 mobile home parks.

The fund has invested in LEM Multifamily Fund VI from Philadelphia-based LEM Capital, owned by former Penn State University board chair Ira Lubert. The strategy of the LEM fund is to "add value and increase rents" by buying and renovating aging apartment buildings. Over 20 years, PSERS has paid more than $200 million in fees to funds owned by Lubert.

==== Investment Groups ====
Since 2006 the fund has invested $1.6 billion in funds managed by The Blackstone Group. Blackstone has collected more than $300 million in fees from PSERS.

==== Thomas Tull ====
The fund has invested $200 million in ventures owned by billionaire Thomas Tull. In 2018 the fund invested $100 million in holding company Tulco LLC. In a closed door session on September 14, 2020, the PSERS board voted to invest another $100 million in a venture code-named "Project Newton." Reporting in the Philadelphia Inquirer revealed this as an investment in another Tull-owned company named "Figs", which sells boutique hospital scrubs.

== Incidents ==
=== Inflated Return on Investments Figure ===
In December 2020 PSERS investment managers told the board that the fund's growth had averaged 6.38% over the last nine years. This figure was just 0.02% above the 6.36% threshold that would trigger increased pension plan payments to 8% per paycheck from approximately 100,000 school employees hired since 2011. Regarding the calculation, chief investment officer James Grossman said, “We did our due diligence. We covered it. I’m not worried about it.” This performance figure was calculated by Buck Global, LLC from PSERS data supplied by consulting firm AON Investment Consulting. The board thought that the fund's performance in 2020 would be poor and might trigger a pension payment increase and hired another consultant, ACA Compliance Group to calculate the performance figure independently. ACA confirmed the 9-year market value return of 6.38%.

The 9-year performance was calculated as the geometric average time-weighted rate of return, net of fees, per pages 8-9 of the Valuation Board Presentation as shown in the "Rate used" column of the following table. The 6.36% threshold for the shared risk determination is based on the 9-year geometric average of the target rates, minus 1.0%, per pages 9–10, as shown in the "Target" column. The "Historical" column, except FY2020, is based on the 49 Year History of PSERS Fiscal Year Rates of Return. Journalist Joseph DiStefano compared the rates used with the historical rates from annual fiscal reports and observed "While the differences were often tiny, the upgrade was sharp for one year, 2015."

Comparison of Target rate, Rate used in calculation, and Historical rate
Year	Target	Rate used	Historical
FY2020	7.25%	1.11%	1.11%
FY2019	7.25%	6.66%	6.68%
FY2018	7.25%	9.26%	9.27%
FY2017	7.25%	10.20%	10.14%
FY2016	7.25%	1.33%	1.29%
FY2015	7.50%	3.41%	3.04%
FY2014	7.50%	14.82%	14.91%
FY2013	7.50%	7.95%	7.96%
FY2012	7.50%	3.44%	3.43%
Geom Avg	7.36%-1.0	6.38%	6.34%

At the Board of Trustees meeting in January 2021, 35% of the board voted against the investment proposals of PSERS staff in an apparent show of dissatisfaction at the administration of the funds under the direction of Glen Grell. The board also voted to hire an outside law firm to investigate an apparently inflated investment return target that may have cost taxpayers at least $25 million.

In March 2021 the FBI began an inquiry into the pension fund. The fund's audit committee hired law firm Womble Bond Dickinson to investigate how the inflated investment return figure was approved. It hired law firm Morgan Lewis to review re-balancing the payments teachers and taxpayers make into the fund and to determine if the fund may have lost some federal tax exemption status due to its investments. In 2019 and 2020, PSERS budgeted $227,000 for legal expenses. It has requested $352,000 for 2021.

On April 6, 2021, state treasurer Stacy Garrity acknowledged that the fund was under federal investigation. The PSERS board voted unanimously to hire New York law firm Pillsbury Winthrop Shaw Pittman LLP to deal with the investigation.

On April 9, 2021, a fourth law firm became involved, when the PSERS board resolved to retain the law firm of Sidley Austin LLP to represent and advise the Board in matters involving PSERS and its employees related to a Federal Investigation and related issues. Sidley Austin was replaced by Morgan Lewis in this role on April 19, 2021, by PSERB Resolution 2021–15.

On April 19, 2021, the PSERS board passed PSERB Resolution 2021–16, amending PSERB Resolution 2020–52, to increase the contribution rates for certain teachers, "certifying the actual nine-year performance figure of 6.34%". The amended performance figure in this resolution triggers an increase of the annual deduction from the paychecks of approximately 100,000 public school employees. Teachers and educational staff hired since 2019 will contribute 8.25% of their pay, the remaining employees will contribute 8%, up from 7.5%.

After its March 5, 2021 meeting, "The Board subsequently ordered a total review of all performance data to identify any additional errors." This concern over possible additional errors appears to be justified, as not only the erroneous 9-year return but also the 3-year, 5-year, and 10-year average returns of 5.62%, 5.64%, and 7.70% respectively, reported on page 92 of the FY2020 annual report are consistent with having used the inflated "Rate used" column. Using the historical column instead, gives 5.63%, 5.63%, and 7.66%, respectively. The reported FY2011 return of 20.37% is used for both 10-year calculations.

In September 2021, the U.S. Securities and Exchange Commission subpoenaed the fund for records related to the adoption of the inflated return on investments figure and records regarding possible improper "compensation and gifts" given to fund staff.

In November 2021, lawyers from law firm Womble Bond Dickenson told a fund board committee that they had completed their independent investigation into the inflated investment return figure. Womble partner Claire J. Rauscher had previously told the PSERS board that some fund employees were concerned with how they would be portrayed in the report, but noted that the investigation found that no criminal activity, and cautioned against full transparency and suggested only briefing the PSERS board verbally, without distributing a written report. Both Democratic and Republican politicians have called for a public release of the report, including Governor Tom Wolf, Attorney General and Democratic gubernatorial candidate Josh Shapiro, and Republican gubernatorial candidates Jake Corman, Doug Mastriano, Scott Martin, Guy Ciarrochi, Scott Gerow, and John Ventre. The report was made public on February 1, 2022.

In January 2024, the Securities and Exchange commission fined the fund $1.5 million, finding that the firm “failed to adequately investigate” the difference between the figures.

During its August 16, 2024 meeting, the board resolved the matter and approved a $7 million legal settlement with Aon. The accounting firm denied wrongdoing and the preceding investigation did not result in criminal charges. The fund spent more that $8.8 million on lawyers and consultants on the matter during the course of the investigation.

=== Harrisburg Real Estate Purchases ===
In early April 2020, the fund revealed it had been served with a grand jury subpoena, without revealing the subject of the documents requested by the grand jury. By April 18, 2020, it was reported that the subject of the investigation was the fund's authorization of $13.5 million used to purchase properties and demolish buildings near its Harrisburg headquarters.

The fund hired several law firms to investigate the purchase and evaluation of properties it bought in Harrisburg. These properties include:

- A $1.6 million purchase of the old Patriot-News printing plant and newsroom in 2017
- A $450,000 purchase of three parking lots near 10th and Market Streets in 2018
- A $200,000 purchase of an additional property on Market Street in 2019
- A $785,000 purchase of two additional parking lots on Market Street in 2020

The money for the 2019 and 2020 purchases came from a $5 million appropriation by the board on October 11, 2019. The two addresses and information about the purchases were not disclosed to the public. Both properties were made through shell companies with addresses at the fund's post office box.

In 2017, the fund created a non-profit, 812 Market Inc., to hold titles for the Harrisburg real estate. IRS filings state that three PSERS employees– Chief Investment Officer James Grossman, Deputy Chief Investment Officer Charles Spiller and Real Estate Portfolio Manager William P. Stalter– are members of the board. The fund filed contradicting reports regarding their compensation as members of the board, some filings state they are unpaid and others that members of the board are paid by PMI Property Management, Inc. The fund said it amended these contradictory disclosures but did not say when they were amended.

=== Board Members Call for Firing of Fund Executive Director and Chief Investment Officer ===
On June 10, 2021, six members of the 15 member PSERS board called for other board members to join them in a vote to fire Executive Director Glen Grell and CIO James Grossman, select an interim executive director, and expand the use of Verus Investments as a temporary outsourced CIO. The letter cites the fund's poor performance and is signed by State Treasurer Stacy L. Garrity, Secretary of Banking and Securities Richard Vague, Acting Secretary of Education Noe Ortega, State Senator Katie Muth, Former State Treasurer Joe Torsella and CEO of the PA School Board Association Nathan G. Mains.

CIO James Grossman defended himself and Glen Grell, citing their recent investment in Figs, a manufacturer of stylish hospital scrubs, which had a successful public stock offering. The fund is not permitted to sell its shares until November 2021 at the earliest.

Jason Davis, a board member who did not sign the letter responded, saying "A four-times improvement is the grand slam. Well done to you and the team." When Grell was asked about the call for his firing, he said "I don’t know what you’re talking about."

The six members calling for the resignations did not have a majority and thus did not call for a vote at the June 11, 2021 board meeting. Regarding the matter, board chair Christopher Santa Maria said only “We had a personnel matter. Those members have asked to withdraw their request. The item has been removed.” Republican board member Frank X. Ryan and five working or retired educators from the Pennsylvania State Education Association did not support the call for fund management to resign.

Days later, PSERS board member Eric DiTullio, who also serves on the board of the Seneca Valley School District, criticized the move in a letter to approximate 4,500 school board members, writing “certain members have been engaged in politicking to get their way instead of open honest communication and discussions based in fact.” His letter also defended the fund's divestment from U.S. stocks and claimed there was no relation between the FBI interrogation and an exaggerated fund performance figure approved by the PSERS board in December 2020. The FBI served pension fund leaders with grand jury subpoenas in March 2020 asking for "any and all" records regarding the inflated fund performance calculation.

=== Investment Advisors Sued by Public School Teacher ===
In June 2021, Kevin Steinke, a Delaware County public school teacher, sued two of the funds investment consultants alleging that their poor investment advice has cost the fund billions of dollars, forcing teachers to pay approximately $26 million a year in additional pension contributions to cover the difference. Named as defendants are investment firms Aon Investments USA of Chicago and Hamilton Lane of Bala Cynwyd, Pennsylvania, in addition to 812 Market, a holding company formed by the fund. The lawsuit cites two recent FBI investigations regarding an inflated investment returns figure and Harrisburg real estate, luxury travel and expenses by fund investment staff, and the fund's high-fee investments.

=== Board Members Complain About Media Coverage ===
In a September 20, 2021, letter to the editor in The Philadelphia Inquirer, 12 of 15 PSERS board members wrote to complain about the paper's September 4th story about on rifts on the board. It read, in part:

"PSERS is not entertainment but an obligation to prudently invest the taxpayer dollars set aside for hardworking teachers and school employees to ensure they can retire after many years of service to our children and commonwealth. While it may not make big headlines in newspapers or generate a high number of online clicks, the reality is that all of PSERS’s trustees have been working tirelessly as stewards of the fund, though sometimes with divergent views."

Notably not signing the letter to the editor were Republican State Treasurer Stacy Garrity, Democratic appointee Joe Torsella and Democratic State Senator Katie Muth, all of whom have pushed for administrative staff changes.

During a closed meeting of the board members in September 2021, board members discussed leaks to the media regarding the federal investigation. Some board members were in favor of asking state prosecutors, the state Inspector General's office, or a bipartisan legislative committee to investigate whoever leaked information.

=== Executives Withholding Information from Trustees ===
In June 2021, board member and State Senator Katie Muth filed a complaint in Commonwealth Court alleging that PSERS executives were withholding information she sought regarding the fund's day-to-day operations, decision-making processes and investments. According to the complaint, PSERS chief counsel Jackie Lutz refused Senator Muth's request, citing "ongoing internal and criminal investigations."

During the board meeting on September 29, 2021, Muth said that board chair Christopher Santa Maria and audit committee chair Frank Ryan were depriving board members of key information.

In October 2021, two additional board members, State Treasurer Stacy Garrity and Joe Torsella filed a "friend of the court" brief supporting Muth's lawsuit. This brief was drafted by Pennsylvania Treasury chief council Christopher J. Craig and said that PSERS executives were seeking to "impose for the first time in the Commonwealth" restrictions on board members to obtain information and that PSERS made arguments in court, ostensibly on behalf of the entire board, without seeking Garrity or Torsella's approval.

== Administration ==
PSERS is administered by a 15-member Board of Directors and is an independent administrative board of the commonwealth of Pennsylvania. They administer the system and as trustees have exclusive control of the fund and power to invest the fund.

The stated mission of the board is to provide timely and accurate payment of benefits, maintain a financially sound system, prudently invest the assets of the system, communicate members and employers rights and responsibilities and effectively manage the resources of the system.

=== Composition of the Board of Trustees ===
Board members consist of:

- Secretary of Education
- State Treasurer
- Secretary of Banking and Securities
- Executive Secretary of the Pennsylvania School Boards Association
- one person appointed by the Governor, subject to approval by the Senate
- three persons elected by the active professional members of the System
- one person elected by the active nonprofessional members of the System
- one person elected by the annuitants and eligible Class DC participants
- one person elected by members of the Pennsylvania public school boards
- two State Senators and two members of the State House of Representatives

The two Senators are appointed by the President pro tempore of the Senate, one from the majority party and one from the minority party. The two House members are appointed by the Speaker of the House, one from the majority party and one from the minority party.

=== Board Members ===
As of February 2021, current members are:

- Secretary Noe Ortega
- Secretary Richard Vague
- Treasurer Stacy Garrity
- Nathan G. Mains
- Melva S. Vogler
- Jason M. Davis
- Susan C. Lemmo
- Christopher SantaMaria
- Deborah J. Beck
- Eric DiTullio
- Frank Ryan
- Matt Bradford
- Katie Muth
- Patrick M. Browne
- Joe Torsella

=== Administrative Staff ===
Executive Director Glen Grell resigned from the Pennsylvania House of Representatives to join PSERS in 2015. Chief Financial Officer Brian Carl joined PSERS in 1995 and became CFO in 2008.

James Grossman joined PSERS in 1997, became a deputy chief investment officer in 2011 and was promoted to chief investment officer in 2014. As of February 2021, Grossman makes $485,000 a year, most in state government. In late April 2021, Verus Investments, a Seattle-based investment firm, was hired to relieve Grossman of his responsibility of "monitoring and oversight of investment." Despite being relieved of this responsibility, Grossman remains in his position. Verus will be paid $810,000 over six months in 2021 to help oversee the fund's investments.

A list of Grossman's private investments held between 2018 and 2020 were made public through a clerical error by the Pennsylvania State Ethics Commission. Grossman reported holding 80 different investments, about 75% of which were also held by PSERS. His portfolio included some funds designed for day trading. Grossman's lawyer Matthew Haverstick claimed that Grossman's investment holdings follow all federal and state laws and are within PSERS staff policy. Grossman investments included hedge funds, small-cap stock funds, leveraged funds focused on volatile industry sectors, and oil and gas investments.

In November 2021, the fund announced that Glen Grell and James Grossman would be retiring. Both would switch to paid consulting positions and leave the fund in May 2022. Robert Devine, a 23-year employee of the fund was named interim chief investment officer in December 2021. Terrill Sanchez, previously deputy executive director at Pennsylvania State Employees' Retirement System was named interim executive director in January 2022.

The internal auditor position was vacant through the end of 2020. In November 2020 the internal auditor position was renamed to the chief audit officer.

In January 2021, Mei Gentry was named as chief audit officer.

=== Administrative practices ===
A 2021 independent governance review report compiled by Funston Advisory Services documented some of the administrative practices of the fund. The report avoided criticizing fund management directly, but acknowledged some problems and presented some recommendations. Among the report's findings were that board members are given an "overwhelming" amount of information from fund managers, often poorly presented and received late, that the fund lacked a strategic investing plan, and that decisions of fund managers are strongly influenced by Wall Street advisors.

== See also ==
- List of Pennsylvania state agencies
