= Pennsylvania House of Representatives, District 56 =

American legislative district

Pennsylvania's 56th State House of Representatives district
Representative
Brian Rasel; R–Penn Township
- Population (2022): 64,562

The 56th Pennsylvania House of Representatives District is located in southwest Pennsylvania and has been represented by Brian Rasel since 2025.

== District profile ==
The 56th District is located in Westmoreland County and includes the following areas:

- Irwin
- Jeannette
- Manor
- North Huntingdon Township (part)
  - Ward 01
  - Ward 02
  - Ward 04 (part)
    - Division 01
    - Division 03
    - Division 04
  - Ward 05
  - Ward 06
  - Ward 07
- North Irwin
- Penn
- Penn Township
- Trafford (Westmoreland County Portion)

== Representatives ==
Representative	Party	Years	District home	Note
Prior to 1969, seats were apportioned by county.
John F. Laudadio, Sr.	Democrat	1969 – 1977		Died on June 6, 1977
Allen Kukovich	Democrat	1977 – 1996	Manor	Elected November 8, 1977, to fill vacancy Elected to the Pennsylvania State Senate
James E. Casorio, Jr.	Democrat	1997 – 2010	North Huntingdon Township	Defeated for reelection
George Dunbar	Republican	2011 – 2024	Penn Township	
Brian Rasel	Republican	2025 – present	Penn Township	Incumbent

== Recent election results ==
PA House election, 2024: Pennsylvania House, District 56
Party	Candidate	Votes	%
Republican	Brian Rasel	Unopposed	
Total votes		32,092	100.00
Republican hold			

PA House election, 2022: Pennsylvania House, District 56
Party	Candidate	Votes	%
Republican	George Dunbar (incumbent)	Unopposed	
Total votes		23,664	100.00
Republican hold			

PA House election, 2020: Pennsylvania House, District 56
Party	Candidate	Votes	%
Republican	George Dunbar (incumbent)	Unopposed	
Total votes		32,942	100.00
Republican hold			

PA House election, 2018: Pennsylvania House, District 56
Party	Candidate	Votes	%
Republican	George Dunbar (incumbent)	17,638	62.97
Democratic	Douglas Hunt	10,371	37.03
Total votes		28,009	100.00
Republican hold			

PA House election, 2016: Pennsylvania House, District 56
Party	Candidate	Votes	%
Republican	George Dunbar (incumbent)	Unopposed	
Total votes		27,727	100.00
Republican hold			
