= John Pippy =

American politician

John R. Pippy
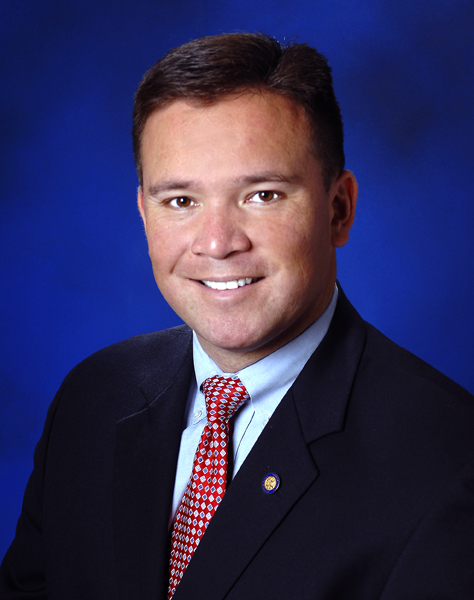

Member of the Pennsylvania Senate from the 37th district
- In office March 24, 2003 – June 30, 2012
- Preceded by: Tim Murphy
- Succeeded by: Matt Smith
- Constituency: Parts of Allegheny and Washington Counties

Member of the Pennsylvania House of Representatives from the 44th district
- In office January 7, 1997 – March 24, 2003
- Preceded by: Ronald Gamble
- Succeeded by: Mark Mustio

Personal details
- Born: December 12, 1970 (age 55) Ubon Ratchathani, Thailand
- Party: Republican
- Spouse: Katherine Pippy
- Children: Katelyn, Reagan, and Sean Pippy
- Education: United States Military Academy
- Profession: Environmental engineer

Military service
- Allegiance: United States
- Branch/service: United States Army
- Years of service: 1992–present
- Rank: Major General
- Unit: 1st Cavalry Division

John Pippy (born December 10, 1970, in Ubon Ratchathani, Thailand) is an American politician and major general in the Pennsylvania National Guard who is the Adjutant General of Pennsylvania. A member of the Republican Party, he served in the Pennsylvania State Senate from 2003 to 2012 and the Pennsylvania House of Representatives from 1997 to 2003.

== Personal ==
Pippy was born in Thailand on a United States Air Force Base to Pensri and Jack Pippy and first entered the United States at the age of one. His mother is from Thailand and his father was in the United States Air Force. Initially after returning, the family lived in public housing in Boston.

Pippy is a graduate of the United States Military Academy at West Point, New York, with a Bachelor of Science degree in environmental engineering.

After graduation, he served on active duty, assigned to the 1st Cavalry Division at Fort Hood, Texas. After leaving active duty, he joined the Pennsylvania National Guard where he holds the rank of major general. He returned to active duty in 2003-2004 after his unit was called up to serve during the Iraq War.

He lives in Moon Township, Pennsylvania, with his wife, Kathy, a political operative and lobbyist. His daughter Katelyn had a recurring role on the television drama Army Wives and played hockey for the Cornell Big Red women's ice hockey program at Cornell University.

== Political career ==
=== Pennsylvania House of Representatives ===
Pippy was elected to the Pennsylvania House of Representatives in 1996, defeating Democrat Andrew McGraw.

Prior to the 1998 elections, Democrats threatened to challenge his residency in an effort to prevent his candidacy for re-election. Their challenge was based on a clause in the Pennsylvania Constitution requiring candidates for the General Assembly to swear that they have been residents of the state for at least four years. Democrats claimed that Pippy was ineligible as he had been on active duty in Texas, was registered to vote in Texas and held a Texas driver's license. Pippy countered that because he was on active duty service, his absence fell under the "public business" exemption under the state constitution. The challenge was defused when the Assembly passed a bill which Governor Tom Ridge signed into law deleting the residency provisions from the candidate affidavit.

Despite the controversy, Pippy won re-election in 1998 and was unopposed in 2000 and 2002.

=== Pennsylvania State Senate ===
In a 2002 PoliticsPA Feature story designating politicians with yearbook superlatives, he was named "Most Athletic."

In 2003, State Senator Tim Murphy resigned to take a seat in the U.S. House of Representatives and Pippy announced his candidacy for the seat. However, shortly after announcing his candidacy, Pippy's unit was called to active duty. This could have potentially derailed his candidacy due to military rules that do not allow active duty soldiers to actively engage in politics.

Pippy initially received a ruling from the Army Reserve headquarters which barred his candidacy. However, after intervention from Rep. Murphy, Assistant Secretary of Defense Paul Wolfowitz issued a waiver allowing Pippy to remain on the ballot. He was, however, still barred from campaigning for himself or exercising any duties of his office, should he win.

Pippy did win the race with 67% of the vote over Democrat Paul Gitnik, but was in Aberdeen, Maryland, with his unit preparing for deployment. Pippy was able to return to Harrisburg on a one-day pass in order to take his oath of office, but was required to return to active duty immediately afterward.

Pippy returned home from Iraq in January, 2004 and resumed his service in the Senate. That fall, he ran for re-election, prevailing over Gianni Floro with 67% of the vote. Floro was named the Democratic candidate after Ernest Simon dropped out of the race in August 2004, effectively leaving Floro with two months to ramp-up a campaign.

Pippy was Chairman of the Senate Urban Affairs and Housing Committee; Chairman of the Legislative Budget and Finance Committee; Vice Chairman of the Law and Justice Committee; and a member of the Appropriations, Banking and Insurance, Transportation and Game and Fisheries committees. He is a member of the Advisory Boards for Penn State Beaver, the University of Pittsburgh Cancer Institute, the Board of Directors for the Greater Pittsburgh Council/Boy Scouts of America, and the Board of Directors for the Heinz History Center. He was formerly the chairman of the American Legislative Exchange Council's Homeland Security Task Force.

He considered a race for Lieutenant Governor in 2005, but eventually stayed out of the race.

Shortly after the Pennsylvania legislature approved the state budget for the following fiscal year, Pippy resigned from his state senate seat at 11:59 pm EDT on June 30, 2012, leaving the seat vacant until the election that November. Businessman D. Raja won a three-way Republican primary to run for the seat on April 24, 2012, but lost to Democrat Matt Smith in the general election.

Since his resignation he has been President of the Pennsylvania Coal Association. In 2017 he received a Masters in Strategic Studies from the Army War College.

In 2024, Pippy was appointed Adjutant General of Pennsylvania by Governor Josh Shapiro.

== Electoral history ==
2008 General Election, Pennsylvania Senate, District 37

- John Pippy - 79,980, 64.8%
- Amy Jude Schmotzer - 34,391, 35.2%

2004 General Election, Pennsylvania Senate, District 37

- John Pippy - 88,306, 67.8%
- Gianni Floro - 41,954, 32.2%

2003 Special Election, Pennsylvania Senate, District 37

- John Pippy - 24,798, 67.6%
- Paul Gitnik - 11,892 32.4%

2002 General Election, Pennsylvania House of Representatives, District 44

- John Pippy - 13,431, 100.0%

2000 General Election, Pennsylvania House of Representatives, District 44

- John Pippy - 25,494 100.0%

1998 General Election, Pennsylvania House of Representatives, District 44

- John Pippy - 10,216, 61.96%
- Thomas J. Fullard III - 6,273, 38.04%

1996 General Election, Pennsylvania House of Representatives, District 44

- John Pippy - 12,961, 57.12%
- Andrew J. McGraw - 9,730, 42.88%
