= Guy Kistler =

American politician

Guy A. Kistler

Member of the Pennsylvania House of Representatives from the 87th district
- In office 1969–1976
- Preceded by: District Created
- Succeeded by: Harold Mowery

Member of the Pennsylvania House of Representatives from the Cumberland County district
- In office 1961–1968

Personal details
- Born: November 15, 1910 Nanticoke, Pennsylvania
- Died: February 16, 1988 (aged 77) Camp Hill, Pennsylvania
- Party: Republican

Guy A. Kistler (November 15, 1910 – February 16, 1988) is a former Republican member of the Pennsylvania House of Representatives.
