= Pennsylvania House of Representatives, District 87 =

American legislative district

Pennsylvania's 87th State House of Representatives district
Representative
Thomas Kutz; R–Lower Allen Township
- Population (2022): 66,300

The 87th Pennsylvania House of Representatives District is located in central Pennsylvania and has been represented by Thomas Kutz since 2023.

== District profile ==
The 87th District is located in Cumberland County and includes the following areas:

- Lower Allen Township (part)
  - Precinct 02
- Monroe Township
- Mount Holly Springs
- Silver Spring Township
- South Middleton Township (part)
  - Precinct 01
  - Precinct 02
  - Precinct 06
  - Precinct 07
  - Precinct 08
  - Precinct 09
- Upper Allen Township

== Representatives ==
Representative	Party	Years	District home	Note
Prior to 1969, seats were apportioned by county.
Guy A. Kistler	Republican	1969 – 1976		
Harold F. Mowery, Jr.	Republican	1977 – 1990		
Pat Vance	Republican	1991 – 2004	Mechanicsburg	Elected to the Pennsylvania State Senate
Glen Grell	Republican	2005 – 2015	Mechanicsburg	Resigned April 30, 2015
Greg Rothman	Republican	2015 – 2023	Silver Spring Township	Won special election August 4, 2015; elected to State Senate in 2022
Thomas Kutz	Republican	2023 – present	Lower Allen Township	Incumbent

== Recent election results ==
PA House election, 2024: Pennsylvania House, District 87
Party	Candidate	Votes	%
Republican	Thomas Kutz (incumbent)	24,755	61.73
Democratic	John Flood	15,349	38.27
Total votes		40,104	100.00
Republican hold			

PA House election, 2022: Pennsylvania House, District 87
Party	Candidate	Votes	%
Republican	Thomas Kutz	18,878	58.29
Democratic	Kristal Markle	13,510	41.71
Total votes		32,388	100.00
Republican hold			

PA House election, 2020: Pennsylvania House, District 87
Party	Candidate	Votes	%
Republican	Greg Rothman (incumbent)	24,239	55.92
Democratic	Nicole Miller	19,104	44.08
Total votes		43,343	100.00
Republican hold			

PA House election, 2018: Pennsylvania House, District 87
Party	Candidate	Votes	%
Republican	Greg Rothman (incumbent)	18,546	56.61
Democratic	Sean Patrick Quinlan	14,214	43.39
Total votes		32,760	100.00
Republican hold			

PA House election, 2016: Pennsylvania House, District 87
Party	Candidate	Votes	%
Republican	Greg Rothman (incumbent)	22,991	62.68
Democratic	James Massey	13,687	37.32
Total votes		36,678	100.00
Republican hold			

PA House special election, 2015: Pennsylvania House, District 87
Party	Candidate	Votes	%
Republican	Greg Rothman	4,202	59.76
Democratic	Robert Charles	2,829	40.24
Total votes		7,031	100.00
Republican hold			

PA House election, 2014: Pennsylvania House, District 87
Party	Candidate	Votes	%
Republican	Glen Grell (incumbent)	Unopposed	
Total votes		19,685	100.00
Republican hold			
