= James Casorio =

American politician

James E. Casorio Jr.

Member of the Pennsylvania House of Representatives from the 56th district
- In office January 7, 1997 – November 30, 2010
- Preceded by: Allen Kukovich
- Succeeded by: George Dunbar

Personal details
- Born: August 23, 1964 (age 62) Jeannette, Pennsylvania
- Party: Democratic
- Education: Saint Francis College; Saint Vincent College

James E. Casorio Jr. (born August 23, 1964 in Jeannette, Pennsylvania) is a former member of the Pennsylvania House of Representatives. He served as a Representative from 1997 to 2010.

He received a B.S. from Saint Vincent College (Latrobe, Pennsylvania) in 1994 and an M.A. degree from Saint Francis College (Loretto, Pennsylvania) in 1995.
