= John Hopper (politician) =

American politician

John D. Hopper
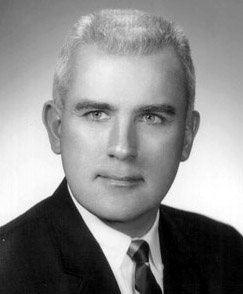
- John D. Hopper in 1976

Member of the Pennsylvania Senate from the 31st district
- In office January 4, 1977 – November 30, 1992
- Preceded by: Robert L. Myers
- Succeeded by: Harold Mowery

Personal details
- Born: January 9, 1923 Camp Hill, Pennsylvania
- Died: June 12, 1996 (aged 73) Camp Hill, Pennsylvania
- Party: Republican
- Spouse: Ann Bowman
- Children: Four
- Education: Dickinson College

Military service
- Allegiance: United States of America
- Branch/service: United States Army Air Corps
- Battles/wars: World War II

John D. Hopper (January 9, 1923 – June 12, 1996) was a Pennsylvania politician. A Republican, he was a member of the Pennsylvania State Senate from the 31st district, serving from 1977 to 1992.

== Biography ==
John D. Hopper was born on January 9, 1923, and attended Camp Hill High School. In 1941, Hopper enrolled at Dickinson College before joining the United States Army Air Corps as a volunteer and becoming a fighter pilot during World War II. In his freshman year at Dickinson, Hopper met and married Ann Bowman, with whom he later had four children. He returned to Dickinson after the war in 1945 and graduated in 1948. Turning down an offer to play professional basketball with the St. Louis Bombers, Hopper received his law degree in 1951 from the Dickinson School of Law.

Hopper worked in the insurance industry until his election in 1976 to the Pennsylvania State Senate to represent the 31st district. He served until retiring in 1992 and was a member of the Judiciary, Community and Economic Development, Labor and Industry, Military and Veterans Affairs, and the Public Health and Welfare committees. He died, aged 73, on June 12, 1996.

Hopper held a degree from the American College of Life Underwriters and was inducted into the Dickinson College Sports Hall of Fame in 1972 in recognition of his varsity basketball career there.
