= Eric Epstein =

American politician

Eric Epstein is a former teacher, college professor, state Senate candidate, self-employed consultant, government reform activist, radio host and nuclear watchdog from Pennsylvania.

== 2004 Senate Election ==
In 2004, Epstein lost to State Senator Jeffrey Piccola in the race for Pennsylvania's 15th senatorial district.

Pennsylvania Senate, District 15: Results 2004
Year	Democrat	Votes	Pct	Republican	Votes	Pct
2004	Eric Epstein	44,653	38.9%	Jeffrey Piccola	70,058	61.1%
