= Pat Vance =

American politician

Patricia H. Vance
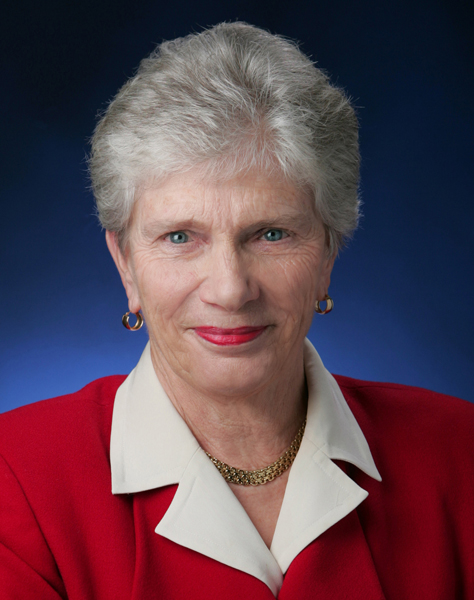

Member of the Pennsylvania Senate from the 31st district
- In office January 4, 2005 – November 30, 2016
- Preceded by: Harold Mowery
- Succeeded by: Mike Regan

Member of the Pennsylvania House of Representatives from the 87th district
- In office January 1, 1991 – November 30, 2004
- Preceded by: Harold Mowery
- Succeeded by: Glen Grell

Personal details
- Born: March 19, 1936 (age 90) Williamsport, Pennsylvania, U.S.
- Party: Republican
- Spouse(s): Charles Doran Vance, deceased
- Education: Harrisburg Hospital School of Nursing
- Profession: Nurse

Patricia H. Vance (born March 19, 1936) is an American politician. A Republican, she served as a Pennsylvania State Senator from the 31st district from 2005 to 2016. Prior to that, she served as a member of the Pennsylvania House of Representatives from the 87th district from 1991 to 2004.

== Formative years and family ==
Born on March 19, 1936, in Williamsport, Pennsylvania, Vance was a daughter of Frederick B. and Mary Huston. She graduated from William Penn High School in 1954, and received her Registered Nursing degree from the Harrisburg Hospital's School of Nursing in 1957. She and her husband, Charles D. Vance, had two sons: Charles Doran ”Chip” Vance, Jr. and Eric Huston Vance, deceased.

== Public service career ==
Prior to elective office, she worked as a charge nurse for a long-term assisted living facility and was employed as a pediatric surgical nurse by Harrisburg Hospital.

Vance then served as the Recorder of Deeds for Cumberland County, Pennsylvania, from 1978 to 1990, becoming the first woman to ever hold that office.

A member of the Pennsylvania House of Representatives who represented the 87th district from 1991 to 2004, she was appointed to the Pennsylvania Emergency Management Authority (1991-1996) and the Select Committee on Rules Review (1999), and co-chaired the Select Committee on Pharmaceuticals (2000).

Vance was then elected as the Pennsylvania State Senator from the 31st district, and served in that capacity from 2005 to 2016. During her tenure, she authored twenty-five laws, including legislation that prohibited insurance companies from discriminating against domestic violence victims, expanded Pennsylvania's prescription drug benefits, and created an HMO customer "bill of rights." She also supported Domestic Violence Act 24-1996, the Pharmaceutical Assistance Contract for the Elderly, and the Tobacco Settlement Act (55-2004).

On September 24, 2014, Vance voted against a Pennsylvania Senate bill (SB1182) that would have legalized medical cannabis in Pennsylvania.

Vance retired from the Pennsylvania Senate on November 30, 2016.

== Awards and other honors ==
Vance was the recipient of multiple awards, including the:

- Advocate for Child Health Legislative Award, Pennsylvania State Education Association, 2008;
- Carlisle Area Citizen of the Year, Exchange Club of Carlisle, 2008;
- Legislator Award, Cumberland County Conservation District, 2009;
- Public Policy and Advocacy Achievement Award, Central Pennsylvania Chapter of the Arthritis Foundation, 2009;
- Distinguished Service to Families Award, Mid-Atlantic Council on Family Relations;
- Friend of Public Education Award, Council on Public Education; and the
- Outstanding Community Service Award, Asian Indian Americans of Central Pennsylvania;
