= Hillsdale, Pennsylvania =

Unincorporated community in Pennsylvania, US

- Unincorporated community
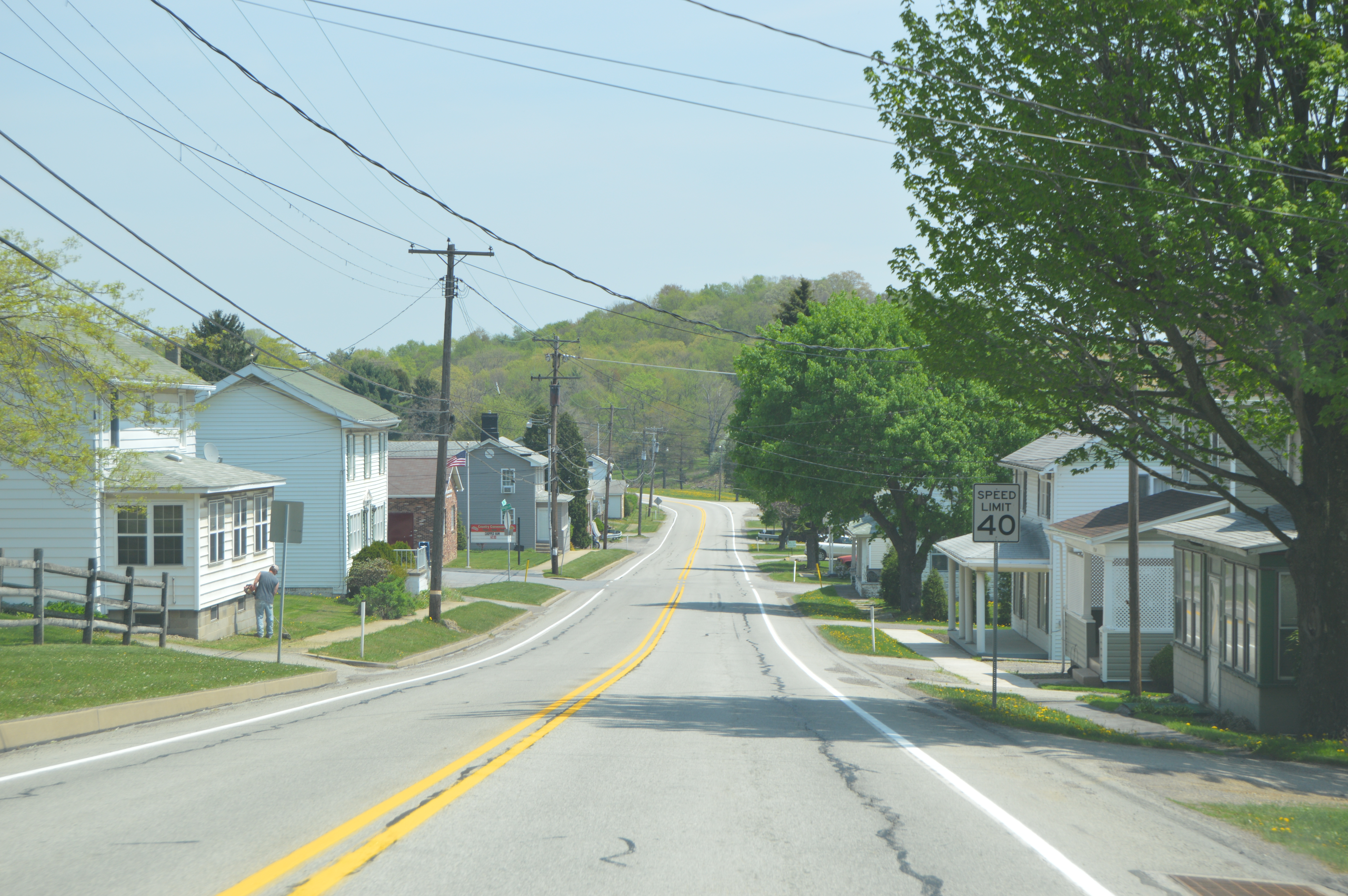
- Along PA 286

- Location within Pennsylvania Location within the United States
- Coordinates: 40°45′06″N 78°53′06″W
- Country: United States
- State: Pennsylvania
- County: Indiana
- Township: Montgomery
- Elevation: 1,683 ft (513 m)
- Time zone: UTC-5 (Eastern (EST))
  - Summer (DST): UTC-4 (EDT)
- ZIP code: 15746
- Area code: 814
- GNIS feature ID: 1177107

Hillsdale is an unincorporated community in Indiana County, Pennsylvania, United States. The community is located on Pennsylvania Route 286, 16.7 miles (26.9 km) northeast of Indiana. Hillsdale has a post office, with ZIP code 15746.
