= Pennsylvania's 39th Senate district =

American legislative district

Pennsylvania's 39th State Senate district
Senator
Kim Ward; R–Hempfield Township, Westmoreland County
- Population (2021): 261,704

Pennsylvania State Senate District 39 includes part of Westmoreland County. It is currently represented by Republican Kim Ward.

== District profile ==
The district includes the following areas:

- Adamsburg
- Arona
- Cook Township
- Delmont
- Donegal
- Donegal Township
- East Huntingdon Township
- Export
- Greensburg
- Hempfield Township
- Hunker
- Irwin
- Jeannette
- Latrobe
- Madison
- Manor
- Monessen
- Mount Pleasant
- Mount Pleasant Township
- Murrysville
- New Stanton
- North Belle Vernon
- North Huntingdon Township
- North Irwin
- Penn
- Penn Township
- Rostraver Township
- Salem Township
- Sewickley Township
- Smithton
- South Greensburg
- South Huntingdon Township
- Southwest Greensburg
- Sutersville
- Trafford (Westmoreland County portion)
- Unity Township
- West Newton
- Youngstown
- Youngwood

== Senators ==
Representative	Party	Years	District home	Note	Counties
John H. Dent	Democratic	1937–1958		Resigned January 27, 1958	Westmoreland
Vacant		1958–1959			Westmoreland
Paul W. Mahady	Democratic	1959–1966			Westmoreland
Paul W. Mahady	Democratic	1967–1972			Westmoreland (part)
John N. Scales	Democratic	1973–1974		Resigned February 4, 1974.	Westmoreland (part)
James R. Kelley	Democratic	1974–1988		Seated June 17, 1974.	Westmoreland (part)
James R. Kelley	Democratic	1983–1988		Seated June 17, 1974.	Indiana (part), Westmoreland (part)
Eugene E. Porterfield	Democratic	1989–1996			Indiana (part), Westmoreland (part)
Eugene E. Porterfield	Democratic	1993–1996			Westmoreland (part)
Allen G. Kukovich	Democratic	1997–2004			Westmoreland (part)
Bob Regola	Republican	2005–2008			Westmoreland (part)
Kim Ward	Republican	2009–present			Westmoreland (part)

== Recent election results ==
PA Senate election 2020 Pennsylvania Senate, District 39
Party	Candidate	Votes	%
Republican	Kim Ward	93,310	67.58
Democratic	Tay Waltenbaugh	44,768	32.42
Total votes		138,078	100.00
Republican hold			

PA Senate election 2016 Pennsylvania Senate, District 39
Party	Candidate	Votes	%
Republican	Kim Ward	111,696	100
Total votes		111,696	100.00
Republican hold			

PA Senate election 2012 Pennsylvania Senate, District 39
Party	Candidate	Votes	%
Republican	Kim Ward	92,984	87
Independent	Ronald Gazze	13,946	13
Total votes		106,930	100.00
Republican hold			

PA Senate election 2008 Pennsylvania Senate, District 39
Party	Candidate	Votes	%
Republican	Kim Ward	60,740	54.1
Democratic	Tony Bompiani	51,571	45.9
Total votes		112,311	100.00
Republican hold			

PA Senate election 2004 Pennsylvania Senate, District 39
Party	Candidate	Votes	%
Republican	Bob Regola	58,107	52.4
Democratic	Allen Kukovich	52,743	47.6
Total votes		110,850	100.00
Republican gain from Democratic			
