= George Dunbar (Pennsylvania politician) =

American politician

Member of the Pennsylvania House of Representatives from the 56th district
- In office January 4, 2011 – November 30, 2024
- Preceded by: James Casorio
- Succeeded by: Brian Rasel

Personal details
- Born: July 3, 1960 (age 66) Pittsburgh, Pennsylvania, U.S.
- Party: Republican
- Spouse: Sandra
- Children: 4
- Education: Robert Morris University
- Occupation: Controller
- Website: www.repdunbar.com

George S. Dunbar (born July 3, 1960) is a Republican former member of the Pennsylvania House of Representatives, representing the 56th Legislative District in Westmoreland County. He was first elected in November 2010. He served as the Majority Caucus Chair, on the Rules Committee, and on the Committee on Committees.

== Early life ==
Dunbar was born in Pittsburgh, Pennsylvania on July 3, 1960. He graduated from Taylor Allderdice High School in 1978 and graduated from Robert Morris University with a B.S. in Business Administration in 1993.

== Career ==
Dunbar served as executive vice president of Wright Industries Inc until 2005. He opened and ran his own consulting business from 2005–2007. He then served as controller and chief financial officer for Ryco Inc until his election to the House in 2011.

Dunbar was one of 75 members of the Pennsylvania General Assembly to sign a letter to the state's U.S. congress members on December 4, 2020, regarding an election review for the 2020 presidential election. The letter identifies election-related legal protections its signers believe were undermined, and asks that Congress "reject electoral votes that are not 'regularly given' or 'lawfully certified'", as they are enabled to do by federal law. Dunbar signed another letter to the state's attorney general the same day that requests a review of state policies and procedures during the 2020 presidential election, and seeks related reviews and recommendations.

=== Committee assignments ===
- Committee on Committees
- Rules

On his official Facebook page, Dunbar openly shares posts from the conspiracy theory website, InfoWars, founded by Alex Jones, to support his belief that the 2020 presidential election was fraudulent, and stolen by voting machine manufacturer, Dominion. These claims have been debunked by Snopes, a fact checking organization.
