= Robert L. Myers (politician) =

American politician

Robert L. Myers III

Member of the Pennsylvania Senate from the 31st district
- In office June 11, 1974 – November 30, 1976
- Preceded by: George Wade
- Succeeded by: John Hopper

Personal details
- Born: May 15, 1928 Camp Hill, Pennsylvania, U.S.
- Died: February 5, 1993 (aged 64) Cumberland, Pennsylvania, U.S.

Robert L. Myers III (May 15, 1928 – February 5, 1993) was a former member of the Pennsylvania State Senate, serving from 1974 to 1976.
