= Glen Grell =

American politician

Glen R. Grell
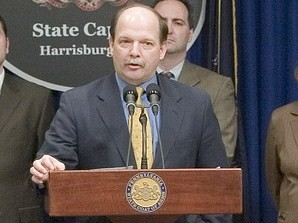

Member of the Pennsylvania House of Representatives from the 87th district
- In office January 4, 2005 – April 30, 2015
- Preceded by: Pat Vance
- Succeeded by: Greg Rothman

Personal details
- Born: December 28, 1956 (age 69) Harrisburg, Pennsylvania
- Party: Republican
- Spouse: Elaine Grell
- Education: Dickinson School of Law; Johns Hopkins University
- Occupation: politician and lawyer

Glen R. Grell (born December 28, 1956) is a former Republican member of the Pennsylvania House of Representatives for the 87th District who was elected in 2004 and served until his resignation on April 30, 2015.

== Career ==
Grell was the deputy general counsel to former governor Tom Ridge from 1995 to 2000. He sat on the House Judiciary, State Government, Insurance, and Labor Relations Committees. It was announced on May 14, 2015 that Representative Grell would be stepping down from the House of Representatives effective April 30, 2015 to serve as executive director of the Public School Employees' Retirement System (PSERS).

== Personal ==
Grell is a 1974 graduate of Cumberland Valley High School and earned a Bachelor of Arts degree from Johns Hopkins University in 1978, as well as his J.D. from the Dickinson Law School in 1981. He and his wife live in Hampden Township with their two children.
