= Allen Kukovich =

American politician

Allen G. Kukovich
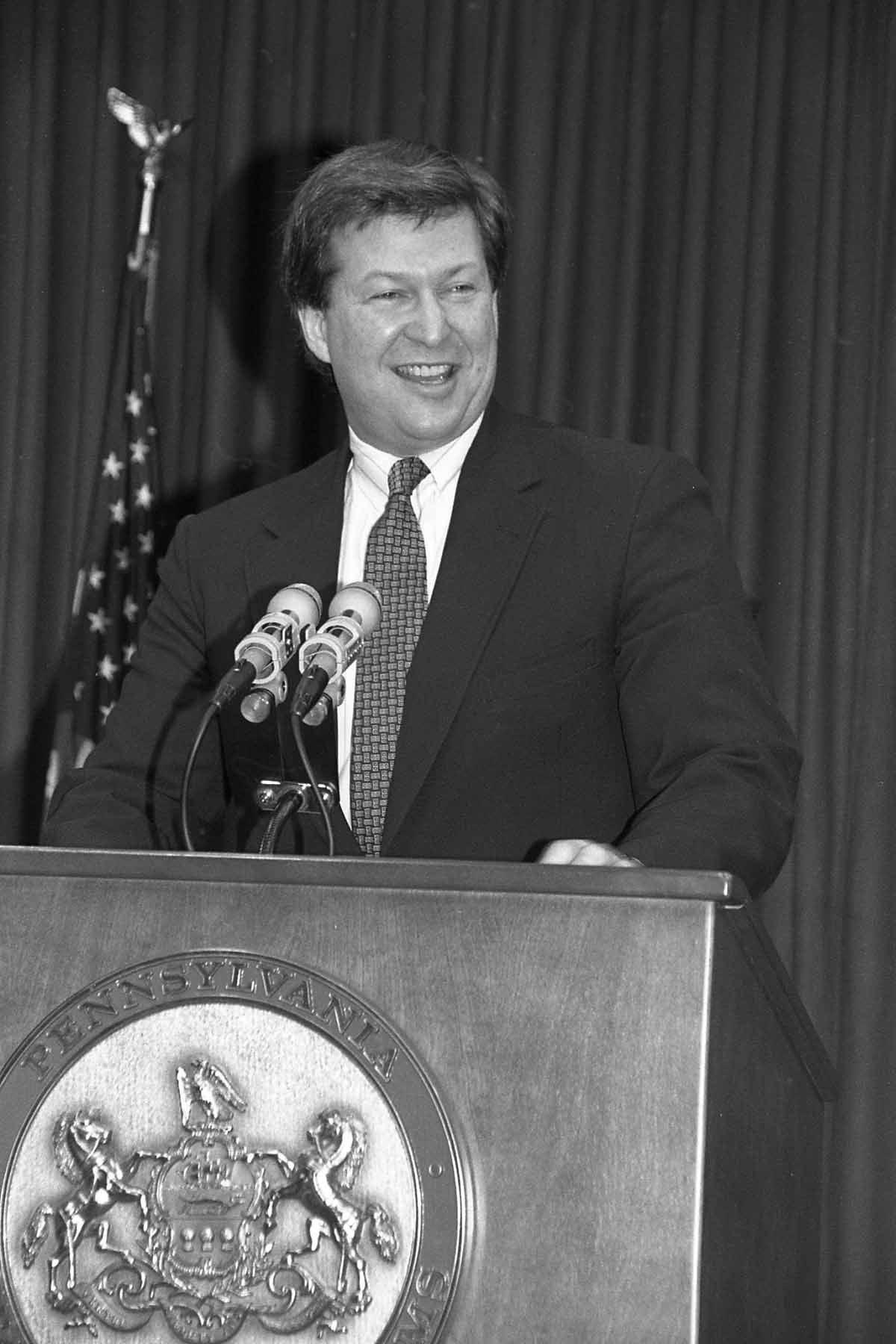
- Kukovich in 1991

Member of the Pennsylvania Senate from the 39th district
- In office January 7, 1997 – November 30, 2004
- Preceded by: Eugene Porterfield
- Succeeded by: Bob Regola

Chairman of the Pennsylvania Democratic Party
- In office June 22, 2002 – March 20, 2003
- Preceded by: Christine Tartaglione
- Succeeded by: T. J. Rooney

Member of the Pennsylvania House of Representatives from the 56th district
- In office November 8, 1977 – November 27, 1996
- Preceded by: John Laudadio
- Succeeded by: James Casorio

Personal details
- Born: September 5, 1947 (age 79) Manor, Pennsylvania, U.S.
- Party: Democratic
- Education: Kent State University; Duquesne Law School (JD)

Allen Kukovich (/ˈkuːkəvɪtʃ/ KOO-kə-vitch) is a former member of the Pennsylvania State Senate, where he represented the 39th senatorial district from 1996 through 2004. He was also a member of the Pennsylvania House of Representatives from 1977 through 1996. He served as the Pennsylvania Democratic State Chairman from June 2002 through March 2003.

== Personal life ==
Allen Kukovich was born on September 5, 1947, in Manor, Pennsylvania, a small town in Westmoreland County.

He attended Penn Township High School before heading to Kent State University in Ohio, where he graduated in 1969. In 1973, he received his J.D. from Duquesne University in Pittsburgh and worked for several years in private law practice in Greensburg, Pennsylvania.

== Political career ==
After the unexpected death of state Representative John Laudadio in 1977, Kukovich won a special election on November 8, 1977, to complete the remainder of the deceased member's term of office.

While in the House, Kukovich served as Majority Policy Chairman and also chaired several other key committees.

A reformer known for his efforts to reduce the size of the Pennsylvania General Assembly and promote open government and accountability, he was instrumental in enacting the Children's Health Insurance Program in Pennsylvania, which later served as a model for the federal CHIP program, and which has provided hundreds of thousands of children in Pennsylvania with free or low-cost health insurance each year. Politically, he was "liberal leaning."

In 1996, he defeated incumbent Democratic state Senator Eugene Porterfield who represented Pennsylvania's 39th Senatorial District. Kukovich the primary won with a 10% margin and won the general election. In 2000, Porterfield re-registered as a Republican and unsuccessfully challenged Kukovich for his seat. In the Senate, Kukovich served as Democratic Chair of the Aging and Youth Committee, where he played a pivotal role in the passing of the expanded PACE legislation.

In 2001, Kukovich authored Pennsylvania’s historic Hate Crimes Amendment to the Ethnic Intimidation Act, expanding the language of what constituted a hate crime to include: "actual or perceived ancestry, mental or physical disability, sexual orientation, gender, or gender identity." At the time, it was the most inclusive language in any hate crime legislation in the United States.

Kukovich ran for Pennsylvania Lieutenant Governor in 2002. In a crowded field, Kukovich came in third place, behind fellow state senator Jack Wagner and the eventual winner, Catherine Baker Knoll

In 2002, the political website PoliticsPA named him to the list of "Smartest Legislators," suggesting that he was "the policy wonk of all legislators."

Following the primary, Ed Rendell, the Democratic nominee for governor, asked Kukovich to serve as Chairman of the Pennsylvania Democratic Party. Kukovich held that post through the successful gubernatorial campaign of Rendell/Knoll.

In November, 2004, Kukovich lost his senate seat to Republican Bob Regola. Shortly after he left office, Kukovich was tapped to serve as Director of Governor Rendell's Southwestern Pennsylvania office.

Kukovich help found the Pennsylvania chapter of Common Cause in the early 1970s and is currently an executive board member of the national organization, Americans for Democratic Action (ADA).
