= Donald C. White =

American politician

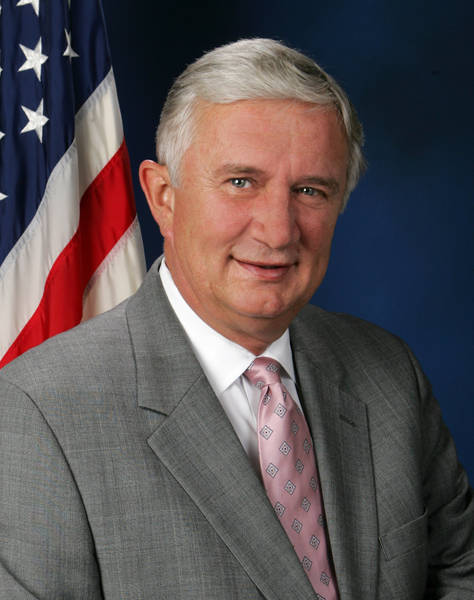

Member of the Pennsylvania Senate from the 41st district
- In office January 2, 2001 – February 28, 2019
- Preceded by: Patrick J. Stapleton, Jr.
- Succeeded by: Joe Pittman

Personal details
- Born: August 5, 1950 (age 76) Kittanning, Pennsylvania, U.S.
- Party: Republican
- Education: Juniata College, Indiana University of Pennsylvania,
- Profession: insurance

Donald C. "Don" White (born August 5, 1950) is an American former Republican member of the Pennsylvania State Senate, representing the 41st District from 2001 to 2019.

== Biography ==
White was chairman of the Senate Committee on Banking and Insurance and was the Vice Chairman of the Transportation Committee. He was a member of four other Senate committees: Community, Economic and Recreational Development, Environmental Resources and Energy, Veterans Affairs and Emergency Preparedness, and Labor and Industry. He is also a member of the PENNVEST Board of Directors.

White worked as an independent insurance broker from 1977 to 2000 and served in the U.S. Army from 1972 to 1975.

White resigned from the state senate in February 2019 and was succeeded following a May 2019 special election by his long-time chief of staff, Joe Pittman.
