= Harold Mowery =

American politician

Harold F. Mowery Jr.

Member of the Pennsylvania Senate from the 31st district
- In office January 5, 1993 – November 30, 2004
- Preceded by: John Hopper
- Succeeded by: Pat Vance

Member of the Pennsylvania House of Representatives from the 87th district
- In office January 4, 1977 – November 30, 1990
- Preceded by: Guy Kistler
- Succeeded by: Pat Vance

Personal details
- Born: January 4, 1930 Chambersburg, Pennsylvania
- Died: March 3, 2014 (aged 84) Camp Hill, Pennsylvania
- Party: Republican
- Spouse: Phyllis
- Children: 3 children
- Education: Dickinson College

Harold F. Mowery Jr. (January 4, 1930 – March 3, 2014) was a Republican member of the Pennsylvania State Senate. He also represented the 87th legislative district in the Pennsylvania House of Representatives from 1977 to 1990.

== Biography ==
Mowery graduated from Mechanicsburg High School and then from Dickinson College with degrees in economics and psychology before entering the insurance business in 1954. He earned a chartered life underwriter (CLU) degree in 1966.

A member of the Pennsylvania House of Representatives, he represented the 87th legislative district from 1977 to 1990.

He was then elected to the Pennsylvania State Senate, and served in that legislative body as the representative of the 31st district from January 5, 1993 to November 30, 2004.

== Illness and death ==
Mowery contracted pneumonia and subsequently died at his home in Camp Hill, Pennsylvania on March 3, 2014.

Pennsylvania State Senate
Preceded by John Hopper	Member of the Pennsylvania Senate for the 31st District; 1993–2004	Succeeded by Pat Vance
Pennsylvania House of Representatives
Preceded by Guy Kistler	Member of the Pennsylvania House of Representatives for the 87th District; 1977–1990	Succeeded by Pat Vance
Party political offices
Preceded by Mike Fisher	Republican nominee for Lieutenant Governor of Pennsylvania; 1990	Succeeded by Mark Schweiker
