= Pennsylvania's 31st Senate district =

American legislative district

Pennsylvania's 31st State Senate district
Senator
Dawn Keefer; R–Dillsburg
- Population (2021): 259,208

Pennsylvania State Senate District 31 includes parts of Cumberland County and York County. It is currently represented by Republican Dawn Keefer.

== District profile ==
The district includes the following areas:

Cumberland County

- Lemoyne
- Lower Allen Township
- Mechanicsburg
- New Cumberland
- Shiremanstown
- Upper Allen Township

York County

- Carroll Township
- Conewago Township
- Dillsburg
- Dover
- Dover Township
- East Manchester Township
- Fairview Township
- Franklin Township
- Franklintown
- Goldsboro
- Lewisberry
- Manchester
- Manchester Township
- Monaghan Township
- Mount Wolf
- Newberry Township
- Warrington Township
- Washington Township
- Wellsville
- West Manchester Township
- West York
- York
- York Haven

== Senators ==
Representative	Party	Years	District home	Note	Counties
George N. Wade	Republican	1941–1974		Died January 9, 1974	Cumberland, Juniata, Mifflin, Perry
George N. Wade	Republican	1967–1972		Died January 9, 1974	Adams, Cumberland, Juniata, Perry, York (part)
George N. Wade	Republican	1973–1974		Died January 9, 1974	Cumberland (part), York (part)
Robert L. Myers III	Democratic	1974–1976		Seated June 11, 1974 to fill vacancy.	Cumberland (part), York (part)
John D. Hopper	Republican	1977–1992			Cumberland (part), York (part)
Harold F. Mowrey, Jr.	Republican	1993–2004			Cumberland (part), Perry (part), York (part)
Harold F. Mowrey, Jr.	Republican	2003–2004			Cumberland (part), York (part)
Patricia H. Vance	Republican	2005–2017			Cumberland (part), York (part)
Mike Regan	Republican	2017–2024			Cumberland (part), York (part)
Dawn Keefer	Republican	2025 – present	Dillsburg		

== Recent election results ==
PA Senate election, 2024: Pennsylvania Senate, District 31
Party	Candidate	Votes	%
Republican	Dawn Keefer	80,963	60.84
Democratic	Mark Temons	52,109	39.16
Total votes		133,072	100.00
Republican hold			

PA Senate election, 2020: Pennsylvania Senate, District 31
Party	Candidate	Votes	%
Republican	Mike Regan (incumbent)	95,228	60.52
Democratic	Shanna Danielson	62,123	39.48
Total votes		157,351	100.00
Republican hold			

PA Senate election, 2016: Pennsylvania Senate, District 31
Party	Candidate	Votes	%
Republican	Mike Regan	87,269	64.61
Democratic	John Bosha	38,478	28.49
Independent	Kenneth Gehosky	9,331	6.91
Total votes		135,078	100.00
Republican hold			

PA Senate election, 2012: Pennsylvania Senate, District 31
Party	Candidate	Votes	%
Republican	Patricia H. Vance (incumbent)	Unopposed	
Total votes		123,096	100.00
Republican hold			

PA Senate election, 2008: Pennsylvania Senate, District 31
Party	Candidate	Votes	%
Republican	Patricia H. Vance (incumbent)	92,959	71.31
Democratic	Susan Kiskis	37,406	28.69
Total votes		130,365	100.00
Republican hold			
