= Pennsylvania's 41st Senate district =

American legislative district

Coordinates: 40.7744°N 79.4231°W

Pennsylvania's 41st State Senate district
Senator
Joe Pittman; R–Indiana
- Population (2021): 254,701

Pennsylvania State Senate District 41 includes all of Armstrong County and Indiana County and parts of Jefferson County and Westmoreland County. It is currently represented by Republican Joe Pittman.

== District profile ==
The district includes the following areas:

All of Armstrong County

All of Indiana County

Jefferson County:

- Bell Township
- Big Run
- Gaskill Township
- Henderson Township
- McCalmont Township
- Oliver Township
- Perry Township
- Porter Township
- Punxsutawney
- Ringgold Township
- Timblin
- Worthville
- Young Township

Westmoreland County:

- Allegheny Township
- Arnold
- Avonmore
- Bell Township
- Bolivar
- Derry
- Derry Township
- East Vandergrift
- Fairfield Township
- Hyde Park
- Laurel Mountain
- Ligonier
- Ligonier Township
- Lower Burrell
- Loyalhanna Township
- New Alexandria
- New Florence
- New Kensington
- Oklahoma
- Seward
- St. Clair Township
- Upper Burrell Township
- Vandergrift
- Washington Township
- West Leechburg

== Senators ==
Representative	Party	Years	District home	Note	Counties
Albert R. Pechan	Republican	1949–1964		Died September 11, 1969.	Armstrong, Butler
Albert R. Pechan	Republican	1964–1966		Died September 11, 1969.	Armstrong, Indiana, Jefferson
Albert R. Pechan	Republican	1967–1969		Died September 11, 1969.	Armstrong, Clarion, Indiana, Jefferson
Patrick J. Stapleton, Jr.	Democratic	1970–1982		Seated June 8, 1970.	Armstrong, Clarion, Indiana, Jefferson
Patrick J. Stapleton, Jr.	Democratic	1983–1992		Seated June 8, 1970.	Jefferson, Armstrong (part), Clarion (part), Clearfield (part), Indiana (part)
Patrick J. Stapleton, Jr.	Democratic	1993–2000		Seated June 8, 1970.	Armstrong, Indiana, Jefferson (part), Westmoreland (part)
Donald C. White	Republican	2001–2004		Resigned effective February 28, 2019.	Armstrong, Indiana, Jefferson (part), Westmoreland (part)
Donald C. White	Republican	2004–2012		Resigned effective February 28, 2019.	Indiana, Armstrong (part), Butler (part), Clearfield (part), Westmoreland (part)
Donald C. White	Republican	2013–2019		Resigned effective February 28, 2019.	Armstrong, Indiana, Butler (part), Westmoreland (part)
Joe Pittman	Republican	2019–present		Seated May 21, 2019.	Armstrong, Indiana, Butler (part), Westmoreland (part)
