= Andrews Bridge Historic District =

Historic district in Pennsylvania, United States

- U.S. National Register of Historic Places
- U.S. Historic district
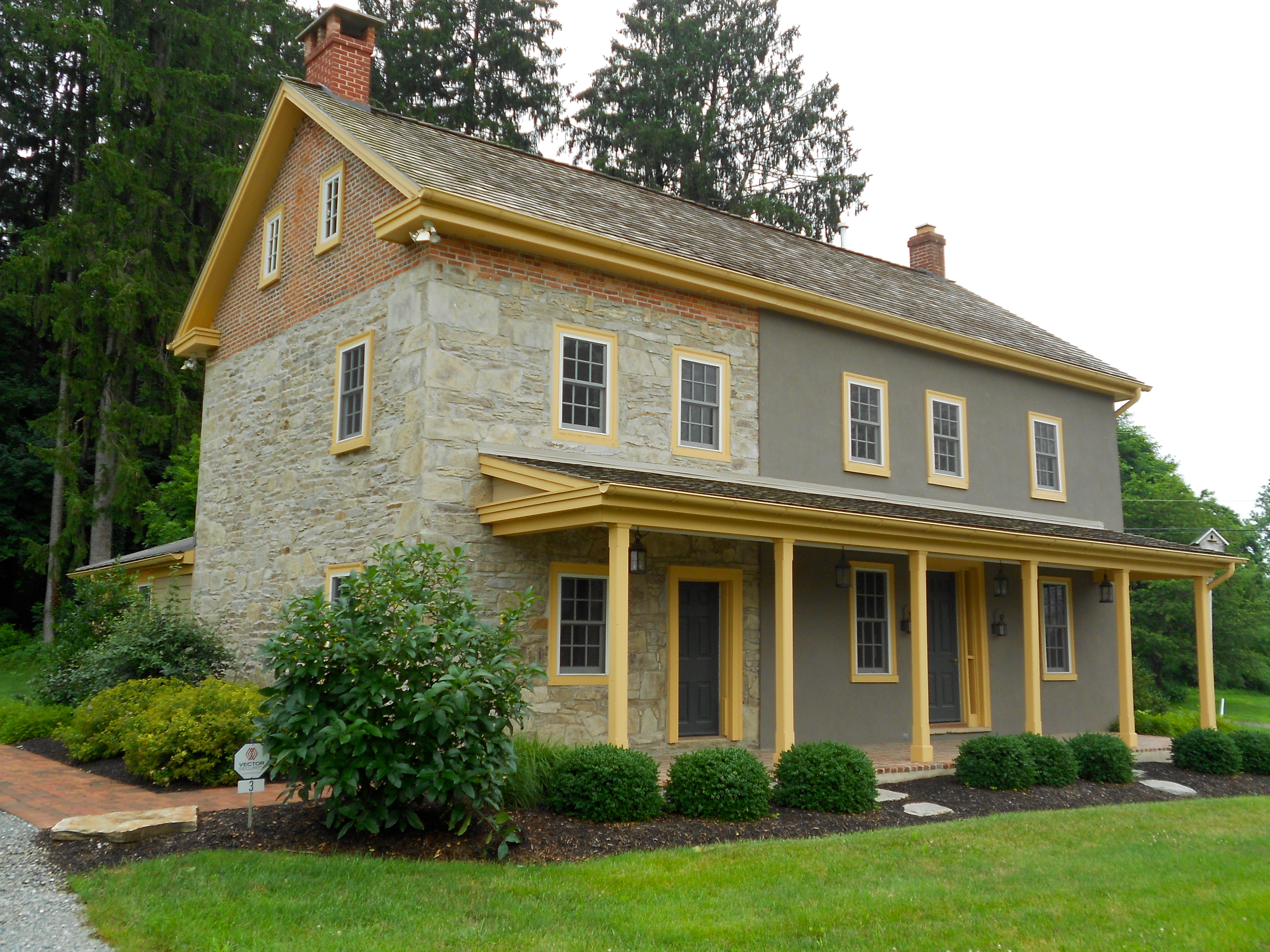

- Location within Pennsylvania Location within the United States
- Location: Jct. of Rt. 896 and Sproul and Creek Rds., Colerain Township, Pennsylvania
- Coordinates: 39°52′15″N 76°00′20″W
- Area: 6.5 acres (2.6 ha)
- Architectural style: Greek Revival, Georgian, Federal
- NRHP reference No.: 88003046
- Added to NRHP: December 22, 1988

Andrews Bridge Historic District is a national historic district located at Colerain Township, Lancaster County, Pennsylvania, United States. The district includes nine contributing buildings in the rural crossroads village of Andrews Bridge. The buildings were built between 1800 and 1850 and are the old Roop's Hotel, a former mill also known as Dobbin's Store (c. 1800), four dwellings, and three barns.

It was listed on the National Register of Historic Places in 1978.

== Gallery ==
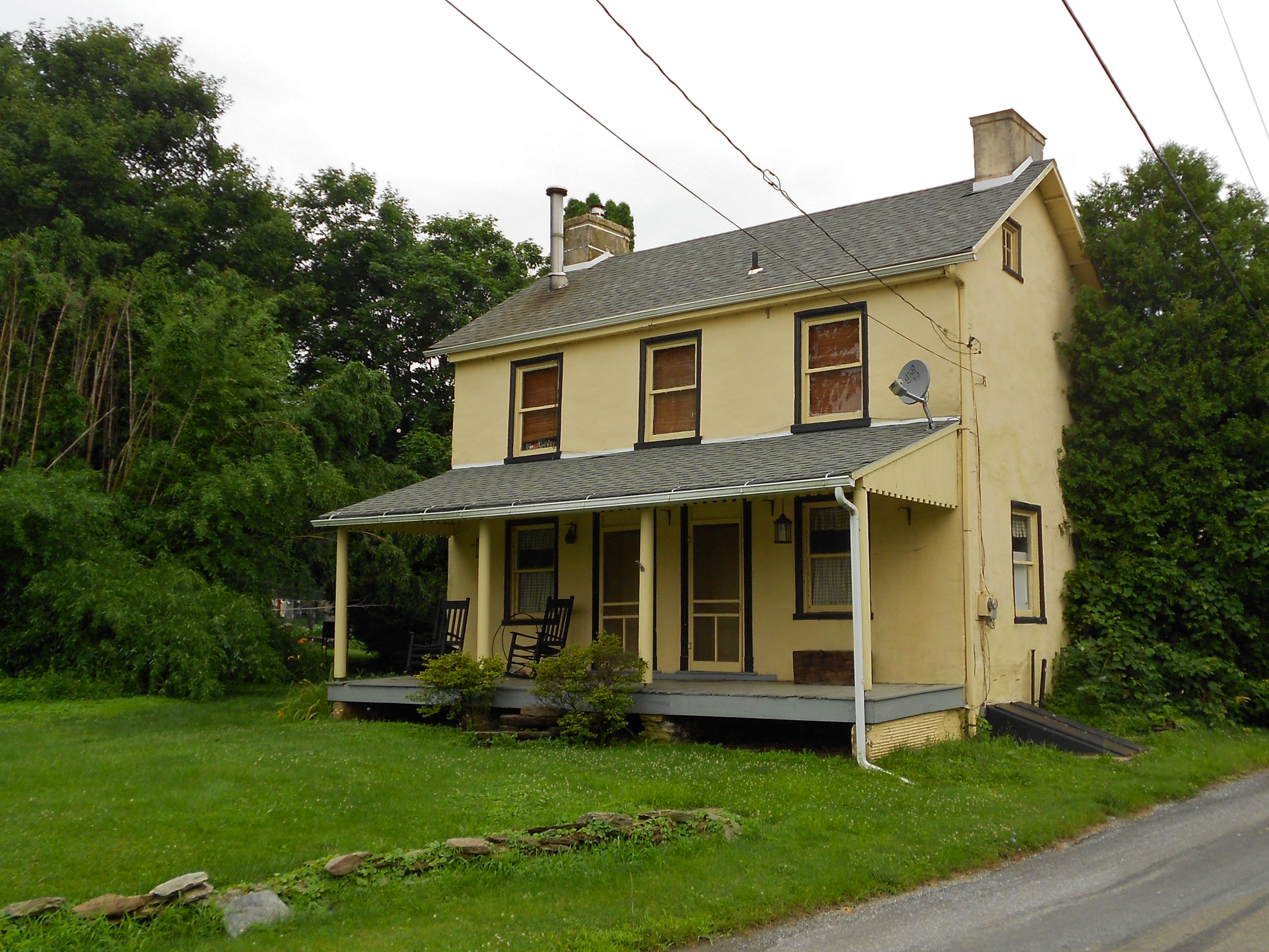

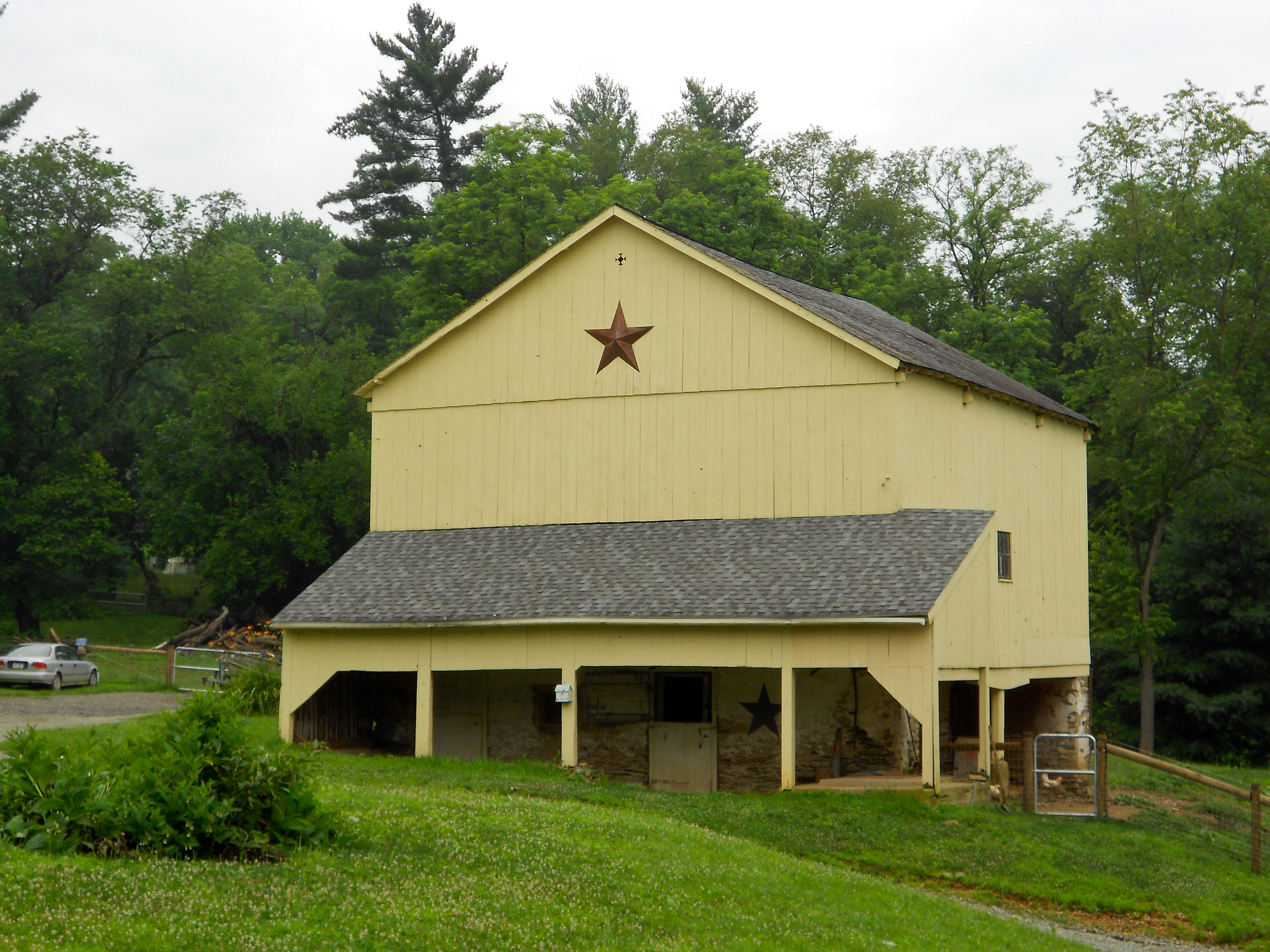

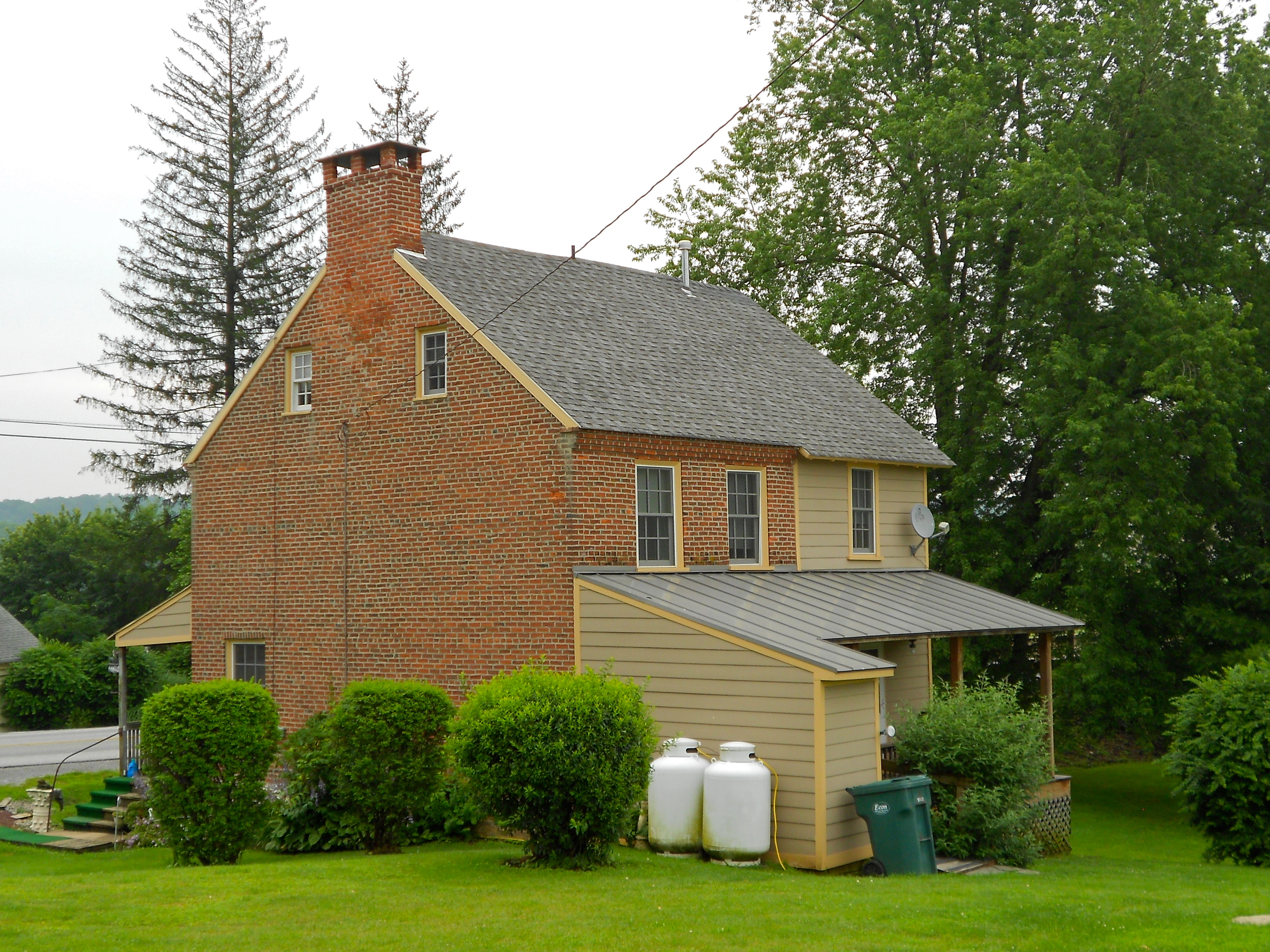
