= Christopher B. Quinn =

American politician

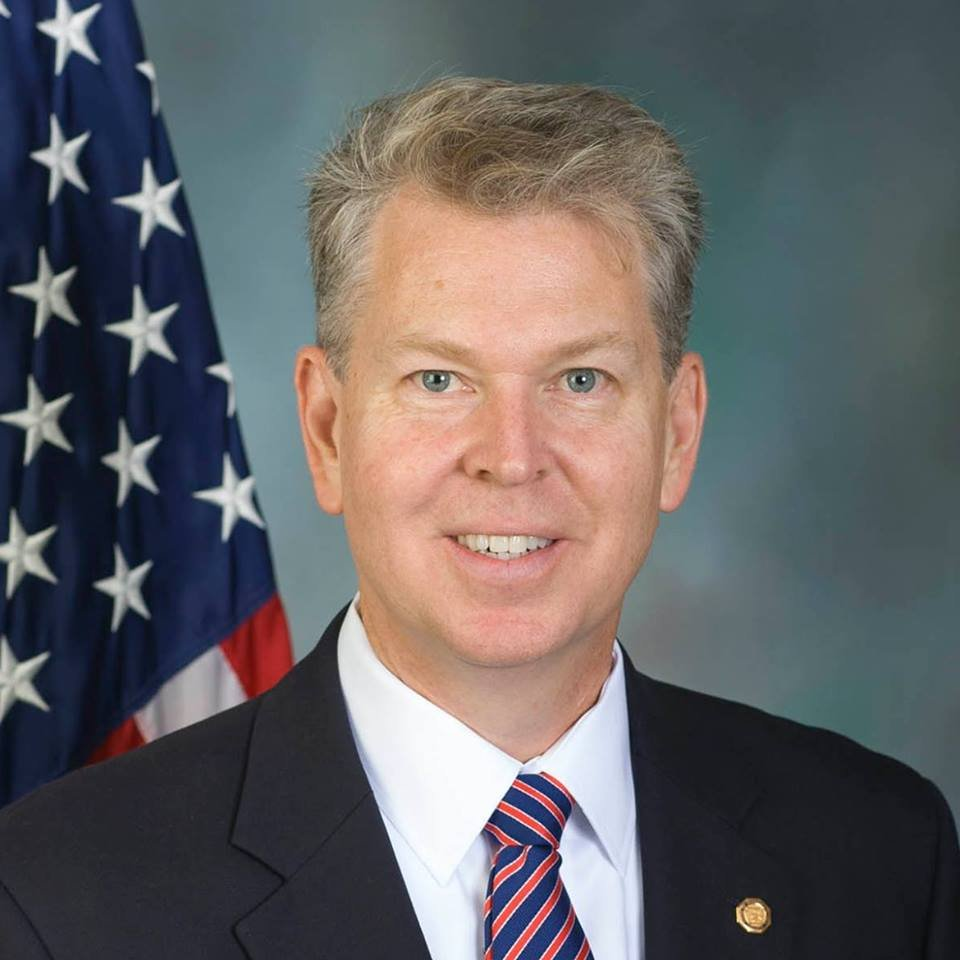

Member of the Pennsylvania House of Representatives from the 168th district
- In office August 18, 2016 – January 3, 2023
- Preceded by: Tom Killion
- Succeeded by: Lisa Borowski

Personal details
- Born: October 11, 1967 (age 58) Delaware County, Pennsylvania, U.S.
- Party: Republican
- Spouse: Carle
- Children: 3
- Education: University of South Florida
- Occupation: Small Business Owner
- Website: Pennsylvania State Representative Chris Quinn

Christopher B. Quinn (born October 11, 1967) is an American politician and former Republican member of the Pennsylvania House of Representatives, representing the 168th District from 2016 to 2023.

Quinn holds a B.A. in economics from the University of South Florida, and started an insurance agency in Delaware County in 2002. Prior to being elected state representative, Quinn served as a Middletown Township Councilman and as Vice Treasurer of the Delaware County Industrial Development Authority.

Quinn was elected to the state House in a special election held on July 12, 2016. During his tenure, he sat on the Appropriations, Consumer Affairs, and Insurance committees. He lost the 2022 general election to Democrat Lisa Borowski of Radnor.

On February 13, 2025, Senator Dave McCormick announced his selection of Quinn to be the Southeastern PA Regional Director for the senator's office.
