= George W. Jackson (politician) =

American politician (1924–2023)

Member of the Pennsylvania House of Representatives from the 101st district
- In office 1981–1990
- Preceded by: H. Jack Seltzer
- Succeeded by: Edward H. Krebs

Personal details
- Born: September 19, 1924 Philadelphia, Pennsylvania, U.S.
- Died: July 6, 2023 (aged 98) Rock Hill, South Carolina, U.S.
- Party: Republican

George Washington Jackson (September 19, 1924 – July 6, 2023) was an American politician who was a Republican member of the Pennsylvania House of Representatives. He was born in Philadelphia and represented parts of Lebanon County, Pennsylvania from 1981 until 1990. After his tenure, he moved to South Carolina, where he died on July 6, 2023, at the age of 98. The Pennsylvania House of Representatives passed a resolution celebrating his life and honoring Jackson's memory on September 26, 2023.
