= Matthew J. Ryan =

American politician (1932–2003)

81st Speaker of the Pennsylvania House of Representatives
- In office January 6, 1981 – January 4, 1983
- Preceded by: Jack Seltzer
- Succeeded by: K. Leroy Irvis
- In office January 3, 1995 – March 29, 2003
- Preceded by: Bill Deweese
- Succeeded by: John Perzel

Republican Leader of the Pennsylvania House of Representatives
- In office January 4, 1983 – November 30, 1994
- Preceded by: Samuel Hayes
- Succeeded by: John Perzel
- In office January 2, 1979 – November 30, 1980
- Preceded by: Jack Seltzer
- Succeeded by: Samuel Hayes

Republican Whip of the Pennsylvania House of Representatives
- In office January 2, 1973 – November 30, 1978
- Preceded by: Robert Butera
- Succeeded by: Samuel Hayes

Member of the Pennsylvania House of Representatives from the 168th district
- In office January 7, 1969 – March 29, 2003
- Preceded by: District Created
- Succeeded by: Tom Killion

Member of the Pennsylvania House of Representatives from the Delaware County district
- In office January 1, 1963 – November 30, 1968

Personal details
- Born: April 27, 1932 Philadelphia, Pennsylvania, U.S.
- Died: March 29, 2003 (aged 70) Philadelphia, Pennsylvania, U.S.
- Party: Republican
- Spouse: Patricia Jenkins

Matthew J. Ryan (April 27, 1932 – March 29, 2003) was an American politician from Pennsylvania who served as a Republican member of the Pennsylvania House of Representatives for Delaware County from 1963 to 1968 and from the 168th district from 1969 to 2003 including as Speaker of the Pennsylvania House of Representatives from 1981 to 1983 and again from 1995 to 2003.

== Early life and education ==
Ryan was born in Philadelphia, Pennsylvania and was a 1950 graduate of Saint Joseph's Preparatory School, in Philadelphia, Pennsylvania. He earned a degree from Villanova University in 1954 and a law degree from Villanova University School of Law in 1959. Ryan served in the United States Marine Corps from 1954 to 1956.

== Career ==
Ryan was first elected to represent the 168th legislative district in the Pennsylvania House of Representatives in 1962. He served in the House Republican Leadership as Policy Committee Chairman from 1971 to 1972. He was the Republican Whip from 1973 to 1978, with 1973–1974 spent as the Majority Whip. He was elected Republican Leader in 1979–1980, with those years in the majority. He served as Speaker of the Pennsylvania House of Representatives from 1981 to 1982. In 1983, the Republicans became the minority and Ryan became the Republican Leader again. In 1995, the Republicans regained the majority and elected Ryan Speaker of the House, a position he held until his death in 2003.

In 2002, the political website PoliticsPA named him to the list of "Smartest Legislators," calling him "quick and sharp with his Irish wit from the Speaker's rostrum" and a "man of true wisdom." In a 2002 PoliticsPA Feature story designating politicians with yearbook superlatives, he was named the "Most Popular."

== Legacy ==
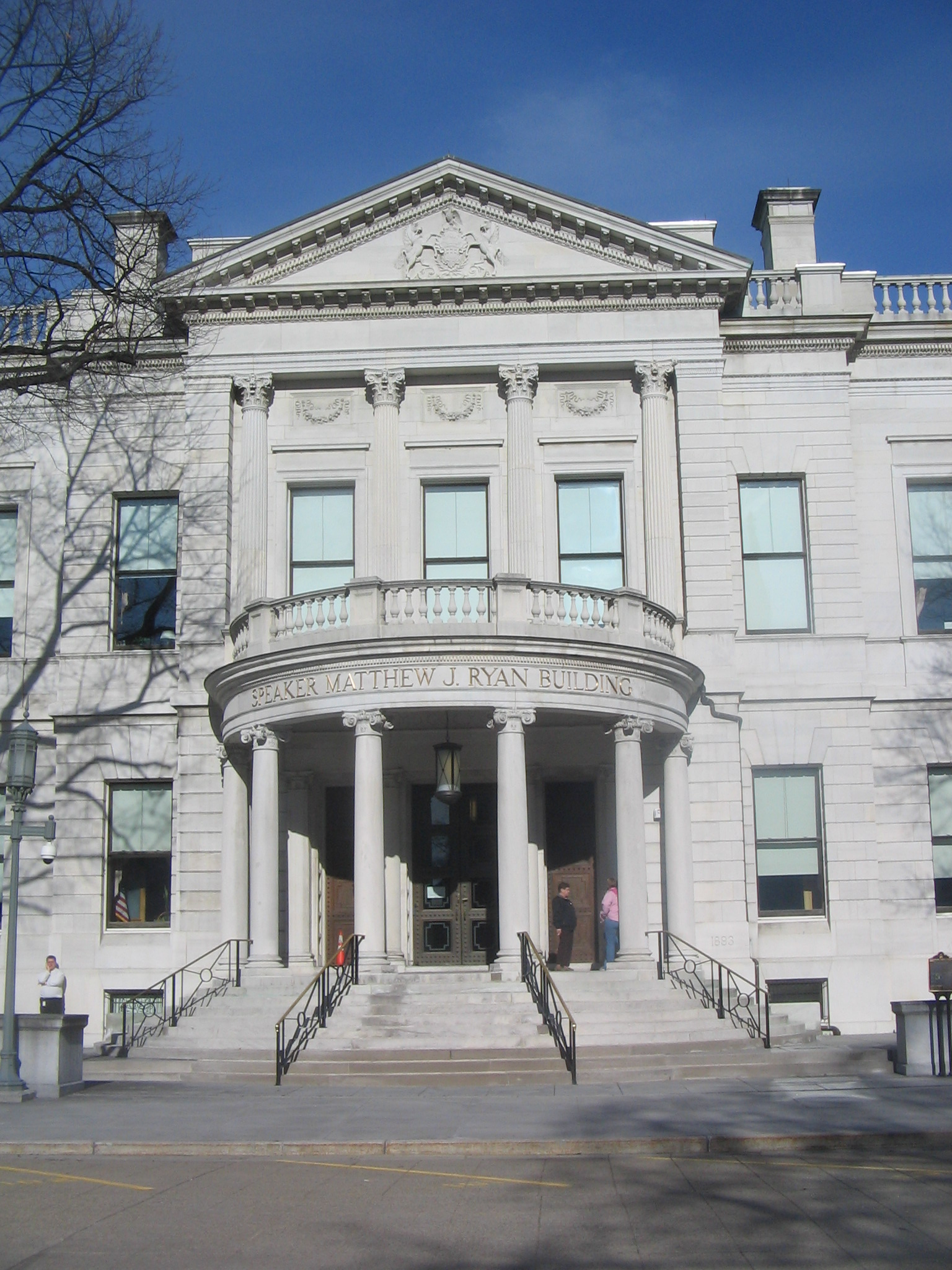
The "Speaker Matthew J. Ryan Building" on the state capitol grounds

The Matthew J. Ryan Veterinary Hospital at the University of Pennsylvania is named in his honor.

In 1999, the Capitol Annex of the Pennsylvania State Capitol building in Harrisburg was renamed the Speaker Matthew J. Ryan Legislative Office Building.

At Villanova University, the Matthew J. Ryan Center for the Study of Free Institutions and the Public Good "promotes inquiry into the principles and processes of free government and seeks to advance understanding of the responsibilities of statesmen and stateswomen, and citizens of constitutional democratic societies." The Ryan Center is run by professors Dr. Brian Satterfield and Dr. Jordan Watts as well as student co-presidents Liam Higgins and Nicholas Shapkarov.

== See also ==
- List of Pennsylvania state legislatures
