= Lisa Borowski =

American politician in Pennsylvania

Member of the Pennsylvania House of Representatives from the 168th district
- Incumbent
- Assumed office January 3, 2023
- Preceded by: Christopher B. Quinn

Personal details
- Born: c. 1966 Delaware County, Pennsylvania, United States
- Party: Democratic
- Spouse: Mark Borowski (m. 1994)
- Parent(s): Francis D. Cianciulli, M.D.
- Education: Drexel University
- Profession: Healthcare Communications Professional
- Website: Official website

Lisa A. Borowski is a Democratic member of the Pennsylvania House of Representatives, representing the 168th District since 2023.

== Formative years and family ==
Born circa 1966 in Delaware County, Pennsylvania as Lisa Anne Cianciulli, Lisa A. Borowski is a daughter of Francis D. Cianciulli, M.D., and the paternal granddaughter of Daniel R. Cianciulli and Rose Marie (Moccia) Cianciulli. A 1984 graduate of Radnor High School, Lisa Cianciulli earned her Bachelor of Science degree in communications from Drexel University in 1989.

She married Mark R. Borowski in September 1994. They are the parents of two sons.

== Career ==
Lisa Borowski worked as a healthcare communications professional for Mercy Health System and Einstein Healthcare Network, and also served as board operations manager for the Philadelphia Police Foundation.

As an elected official, she served as a Radnor Township commissioner (2018–2022) and school board member (2011–2015).

On November 8, 2022, she unseated Republican incumbent Christopher B. Quinn to represent the 168th House district, with 17,485 votes to Quinn's 13,708.
