= Albert Dutton MacDade =

American politician (1871-1954)

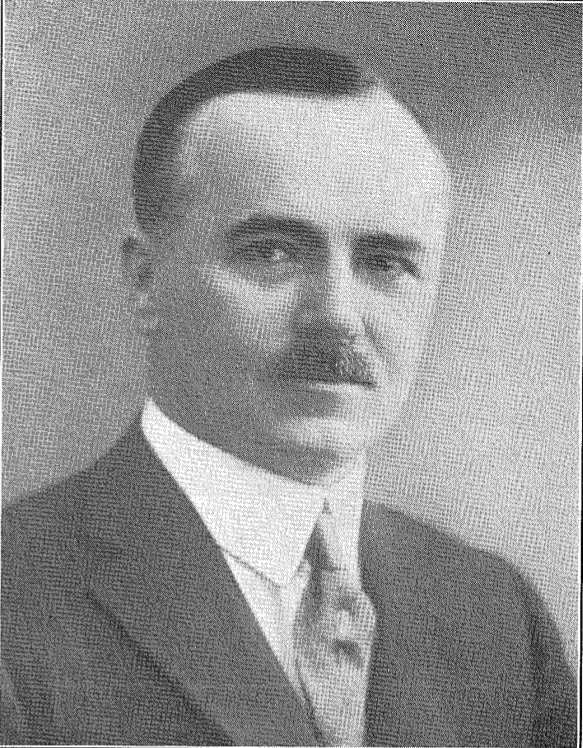

District Attorney, Delaware County
- In office 1906–1912

Pennsylvania Senate, 9th Senatorial District
- In office 1921–1929
- Preceded by: Richard J. Baldwin
- Succeeded by: John J. McClure

Judge, Pennsylvania Court of Common Pleas, Delaware County
- In office 1942–1948

Personal details
- Born: September 23, 1871 Marcus Hook, Pennsylvania, U.S.
- Died: October 4, 1954 (aged 83) Philadelphia, Pennsylvania, U.S.
- Resting place: Lawn Croft Cemetery, Linwood, Pennsylvania, U.S.
- Party: Republican
- Spouse: Mabel Troth (m. 1899)
- Education: Penn Law School
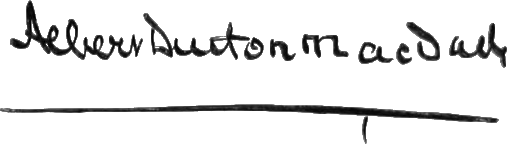
- Signature

Albert Dutton MacDade (September 23, 1871 – October 4, 1954) was an American politician from Pennsylvania who served as district attorney for Delaware County from 1906 to 1912, as a Republican member of the Pennsylvania State Senate for the 9th Senatorial District from 1921 to 1929 and as Judge in the Pennsylvania Court of Common Pleas for Delaware County from 1942 to 1948.

== Early life and education ==
MacDade was born in Marcus Hook, Pennsylvania, to Joseph Walker and Amie (Hedden) MacDade. He graduated from Chester High School in 1888 and the University of Pennsylvania Law School in 1894.

== Career ==
In 1894, MacDade was accepted to the Delaware County bar. He served as the district attorney of Delaware county from 1906 to 1912 and as a Pennsylvania State Senator from 1920 to 1928.

MacDade was elected judge of the Delaware County Court of Common Pleas from 1942 to 1948 and served as president judge in 1943

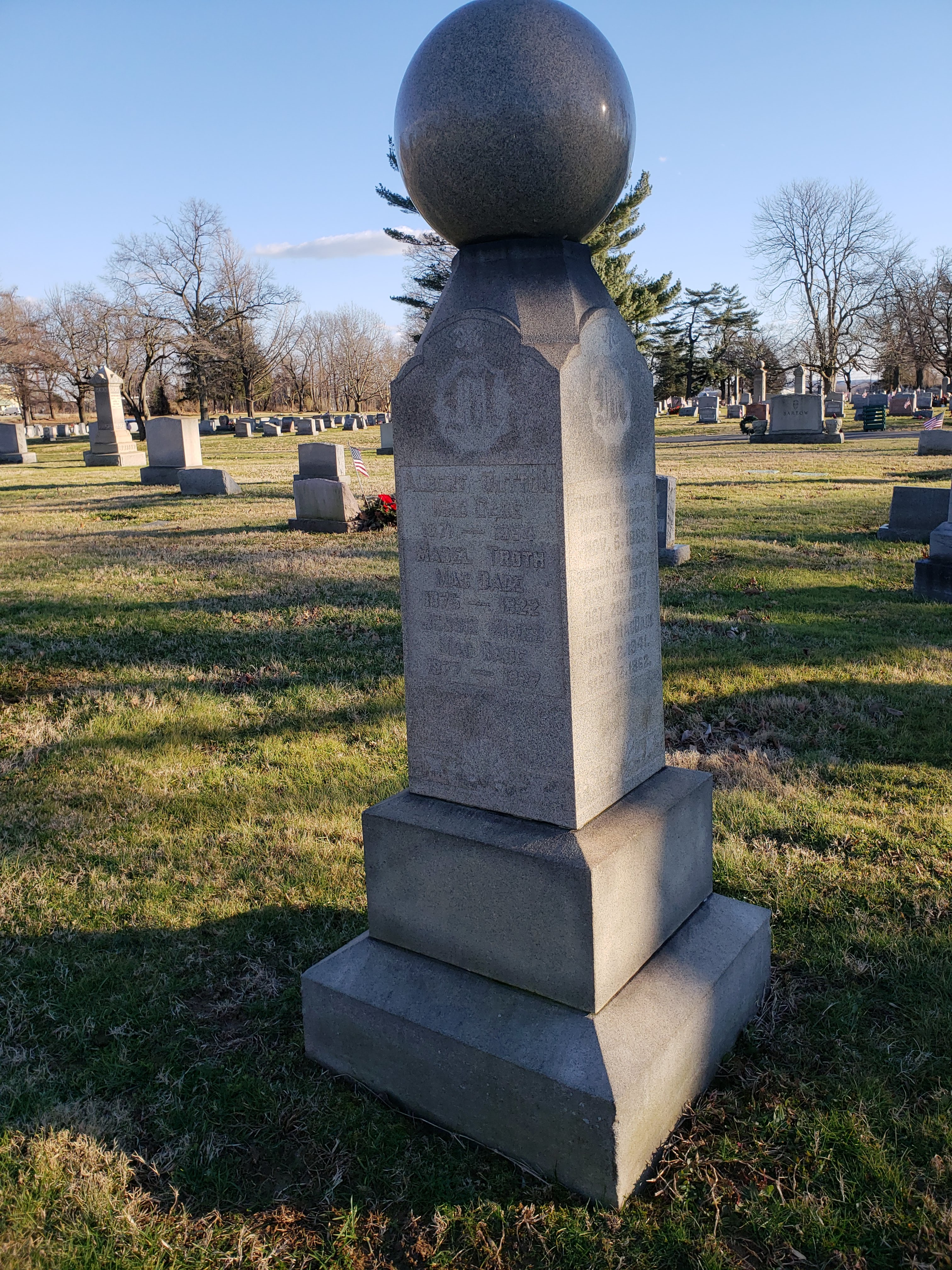
Albert Dutton MacDade grave in Lawn Croft Cemetery, Linwood Pennsylvania

== Personal life ==
MacDade married Mabel Troth in 1899 and together they had two children.

MacDade was a member of the First Baptist Church in Chester, Pennsylvania.

MacDade was a member of the American and State Bar Associations, the Pennsylvania National Guard for three years and was a "four-minute man" and chairman of the legal advisory board of Chester, Pennsylvania during World War I. He was a member of the Improved Order of Red Men, the Independent Order of Odd Fellows, the Patriotic Order of the Sons of America, the Loyal Order of Moose and was a thirty-second degree Mason.

He died in Philadelphia on October 4, 1954, and is interred at the Lawn Croft Cemetery in Linwood, Pennsylvania.

== Legacy ==
In 1933, Parker Avenue in Collingdale, Pennsylvania, was renamed MacDade Boulevard in honor of MacDade.

Pennsylvania State Senate
Preceded by Richard J. Baldwin	Member of the Pennsylvania Senate for the 9th district 1921-1929	Succeeded by John J. McClure
