= Pennsylvania House of Representatives, District 168 =

American legislative district

Pennsylvania's 168th State House of Representatives district
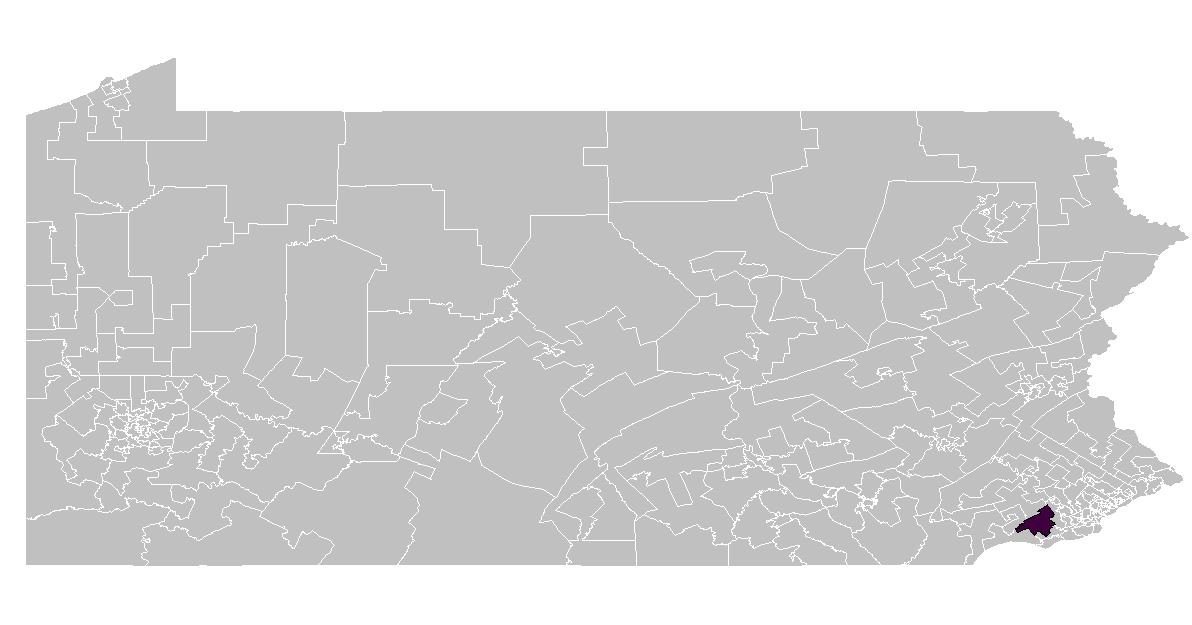
Representative
Lisa Borowski; D–Radnor Township
- Population (2021): 62,978

Pennsylvania House of Representatives District 168 includes part of Delaware County. It is currently represented by Democrat Lisa Borowski.

== District profile ==
The district includes the following areas:

Delaware County:

- Edgmont Township
- Middletown Township (PART)
  - District 02 [PART, Division 03]
  - District 03
  - District 04
- Newtown Township
- Radnor Township

== Representatives ==
Representative	Party	Years	District home	Note
Prior to 1969, seats were apportioned by county.
Matthew J. Ryan	Republican	1969 – 2003		Died March 29, 2003.
Tom Killion	Republican	2003 – 2016	Middletown Township	Elected on June 17, 2003, to fill vacancy Resigned to serve in the State Senate on May 11, 2016.
Christopher B. Quinn	Republican	2016 – 2022	Middletown Township	Elected on July 12, 2016, to fill vacancy
Lisa Borowski	Democrat	2022 – present	Radnor Township	Elected on November 9, 2022

== Recent election results ==
2022 election
Party	Candidate	Votes	%
Democratic	Lisa Borowski	17,485	56.1
Republican	Christopher B. Quinn (incumbent)	13,708	43.9
Total votes		31,193	100.0
Democratic gain from Republican			

2020 election
Party	Candidate	Votes	%
Republican	Christopher B. Quinn (incumbent)	22,399	51.0
Democratic	Deb Ciamacca	21,526	49.0
Total votes		43,925	100.0
Republican hold			

2018 election
Party	Candidate	Votes	%
Republican	Christopher B. Quinn (incumbent)	17,369	50.7
Democratic	Kristin Seale	16,919	49.3
Total votes		34,288	100.0
Republican hold			

2016 election
Party	Candidate	Votes	%
Republican	Christopher B. Quinn (incumbent)	21,058	56.1
Democratic	Diane Levy	16,447	43.9
Total votes		37,505	100.0
Republican hold			

2016 special election
Party	Candidate	Votes	%
Republican	Christopher B. Quinn	5,627	58.3
Democratic	Diane Levy	4,031	41.7
Total votes		9,658	100.0
Republican hold			

2014 election
Party	Candidate	Votes	%
Republican	Tom Killion (incumbent)	16,397	64.7
Total votes		16,397	100.0
Republican hold			

2012 election
Party	Candidate	Votes	%
Republican	Tom Killion (incumbent)	20,499	57.9
Democratic	Beth Alois	14,910	42.1
Total votes		35,409	100.0
Republican hold			

2010 election
Party	Candidate	Votes	%
Republican	Tom Killion (incumbent)	16,534	61.8
Democratic	Gail Conner	10,224	38.2
Total votes		26,758	100.0
Republican hold			
