= Tom Killion =

American politician

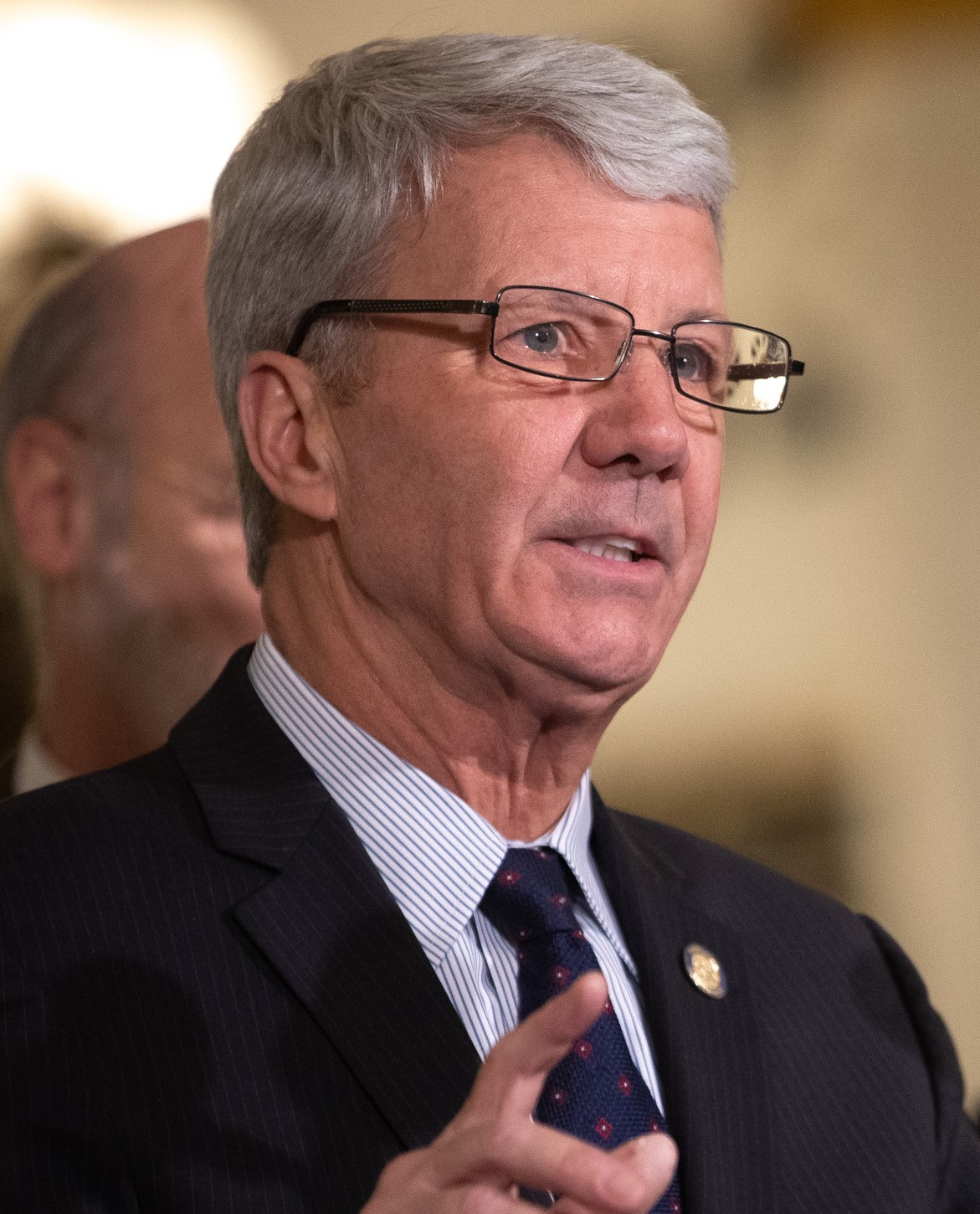

Member of the Pennsylvania Senate from the 9th district
- In office May 11, 2016 – November 30, 2020
- Preceded by: Dominic F. Pileggi
- Succeeded by: John I. Kane

Member of the Pennsylvania House of Representatives from the 168th district
- In office June 30, 2003 – May 11, 2016
- Preceded by: Matt Ryan
- Succeeded by: Christopher B. Quinn

Personal details
- Born: June 19, 1957 (age 69) Philadelphia, Pennsylvania
- Party: Republican
- Education: Pennsylvania State University

Thomas H. Killion (born 1957) is an American politician. A Republican, he was a member of the Pennsylvania State Senate for the 9th Senatorial District from 2016 until 2020. He previously served as a member of the Pennsylvania House of Representatives for the 168th district from 2003 to 2016.

== Early life and education ==
Killion was born in Philadelphia, Pennsylvania and graduated from Cardinal O'Hara High School in 1975. He received a B.S. in criminal justice from the Pennsylvania State University in 1979.

== Political career ==
=== Early career ===
Killion served as a fraud investigator with the Pennsylvania Department of Revenue and later founded his own pension advisory firm, InR Advisors. In 1990, he became the campaign chairman for Rep. Curt Weldon and worked in that capacity through 2003.

He was elected as a member of Delaware County Council in 1991 and served from 1992 to 2000 including as Chairman.

=== Pennsylvania House of Representatives ===
Killion was elected to the Pennsylvania House of Representatives for the 168th district in 2003. He defeated William Thomas in a special election to succeed former Pennsylvania House Speaker Rep. Matt Ryan, who died of leukemia earlier that year. He was re-elected to six consecutive terms until his resignation on May 10, 2016.

Killion announced plans to run for Lieutenant Governor on December 4, 2009. He ended his campaign for that position on January 8, 2010, and announced plans to once again run for the State House in 2010.

=== Pennsylvania State Senate ===
He was elected to the Pennsylvania State Senate for the 9th Senatorial District in a special election on April 26, 2016 to replace Dominic Pileggi and was sworn into office on May 11, 2016.

Killion has served on multiple boards including for the Children and Adult Disability and Educational Services (CADES), SEPTA, VisitPhilly, the Chester County Chamber of Business & Industry, Southeastern PA Chamber of Commerce and the Southeastern PA Leukemia & Lymphoma Society.

Killion was defeated in his bid for re-election in 2020 by Democrat John I. Kane.

== Personal life ==
Killion lives in Middletown Township, Delaware County, Pennsylvania with his wife and daughters. He is a member of the St. Thomas the Apostle Church in Chester Heights, Pennsylvania.

Pennsylvania State Senate
Preceded by Dominic F. Pileggi	Member of the Pennsylvania Senate from the 9th district 2016–2020	Succeeded by John I. Kane
Pennsylvania House of Representatives
Preceded by Matt Ryan	Member of the Pennsylvania House of Representatives for the 168th District; 2003–2016	Succeeded by Christopher B. Quinn
