= John I. Kane =

American politician and trade union leader

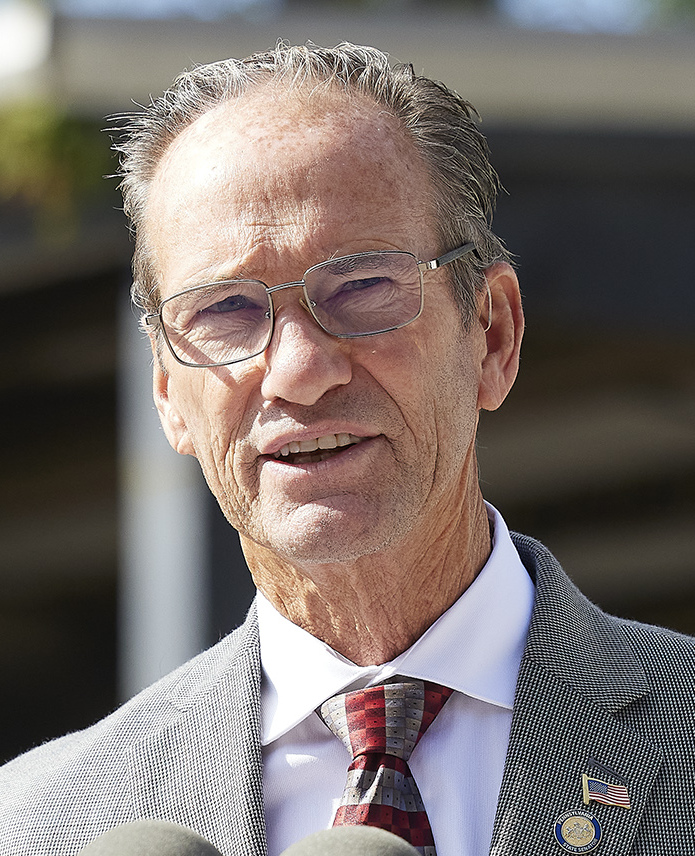

Member of the Pennsylvania Senate from the 9th district
- Incumbent
- Assumed office January 5, 2021
- Preceded by: Tom Killion

Personal details
- Born: November 12, 1960 (age 66)
- Party: Democratic
- Spouse: Lori
- Children: 4
- Occupation: Plumber
- Profession: Business Manager of Plumbers Union Local #690
- Website: Campaign website

John Ignatius Kane Sr. (born November 12, 1960) is an American politician and trade union leader. He is a Democratic member of the Pennsylvania State Senate, representing the 9th District since 2021.

Kane trained as a plumber, stating that learning a trade gave his life direction. He later became the Business Manager of the Philadelphia Plumbers Local 690. Kane ran for state senate in 2014, against Thomas J. McGarrigle.

He defeated Brett Burman in the Democratic primary for the 9th district on June 2, 2020. He won the November 2020 general election over incumbent Republican Tom Killion, receiving 52% of the vote compared to Killion's 48%.

He ran for re-election in 2024 against Mike Woodin.

== Pennsylvania State Senate ==
John Kane was first elected to the Pennsylvania State Senate in the November 2020 general election, defeating the incumbent Tom Killion.

=== Legislation ===
Kane, joined by Senators Devlin Robinson and Art Haywood, sponsored Senate Bill 986, which would establish the Safe School Drinking Water Fund. This would mandate that all schools equip drinking water outlets with lead filters. The bill was referred to the Education Committee on November 15, 2023.

=== Committee assignments ===
For the 2025-2026 Session Kane serves on the following committees in the State Senate:

- Labor & Industry (Minority Chair)
- Communications & Technology
- Environmental Resources & Energy
- Veterans Affairs & Emergency Preparedness

=== Political Positions ===
==== 2020 Election ====
Kane disagrees with claims of fraud in the 2020 election, and he opposed attempts to overturn the election.

==== Abortion ====
Kane supports legal abortion. He was endorsed by Planned Parenthood in 2024.

==== Voting ====
Kane supports mail-in voting.

Organized Labor

Kane, along with 19 other state Senate Democrats, sent a letter to Pennsylvania State University leadership, calling for them to cease legal challenges to graduate assistants' vote to unionize.
