= John Douglass House =

Historic house in Pennsylvania, United States

- U.S. National Register of Historic Places
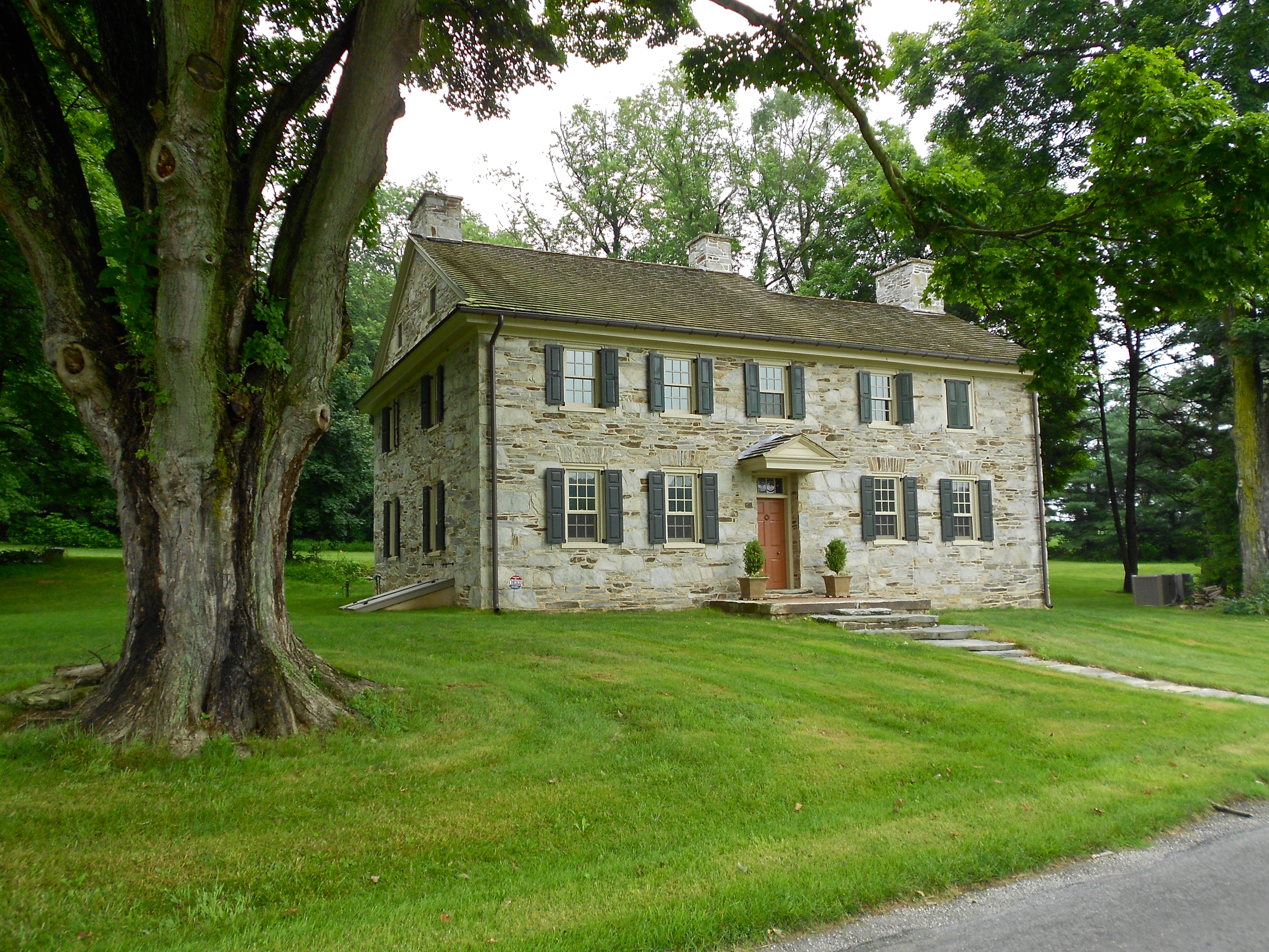

- Location within Pennsylvania Location within the United States
- Location: Sproul Road, south of Pennsylvania Route 896, Kirkwood, Colerain Township, Pennsylvania
- Coordinates: 39°51′55″N 76°0′30″W
- Area: 2 acres (0.81 ha)
- Built: c. 1769
- Architectural style: Georgian
- NRHP reference No.: 90001411
- Added to NRHP: September 5, 1990

The John Douglass House is an historic home that is located in Colerain Township in Lancaster County, Pennsylvania, United States.

The birthplace of Pennsylvania Governor William Cameron Sproul (1870–1928), it was listed on the National Register of Historic Places in 1990.

== History and architectural features ==
This historic structure is a 2 1/2-story, five-bay, stone dwelling with a center hall plan, and was designed in the Georgian style. Built circa 1769, with a remodeling sometime after 1815 when a summer kitchen was added and the original walk-in fireplace was filled in, this house was restored in 2007. Also located on the property are a contributing bank barn, log smokehouse, and the ruins of a stone carriage shed. It was the birthplace of Pennsylvania Governor William Cameron Sproul (1870–1928).
