= Moose Lodge No. 107 v. Irvis =

- Supreme Court of the United States

Argued February 28, 1972 Decided June 12, 1972
- Full case name: Moose Lodge No. 107 v. Irvis et al.
- Citations: 407 U.S. 163 (more)

Case history
- Prior: District Court for the Middle District of Pennsylvania

Holding
- The government's issuance of a liquor license to a private club does not constitute "state action" under the Fourteenth Amendment, unless a specific regulation forces the enforcement of discriminatory bylaws.

Court membership
- Chief Justice Warren E. Burger Associate Justices William O. Douglas · William J. Brennan Jr. Potter Stewart · Byron White; Thurgood Marshall · Harry Blackmun; Lewis F. Powell Jr. · William Rehnquist

Case opinions
- Majority: Rehnquist, joined by Burger, Stewart, White, Blackmun, Powell
- Dissent: Douglas, joined by Marshall
- Dissent: Brennan, joined by Marshall

Laws applied
- Fourteenth Amendment

Moose Lodge No. 107 v. Irvis, 407 U.S. 163 (1972), was a United States Supreme Court case concerning the scope of state action. K. Leroy Irvis, a black man and a member of the Pennsylvania House of Representatives, sued the Moose Lodge over being refused food and drink service due to his race. In the era, liquor licenses were not common, and the Moose Lodge was a rare nearby bar to the Pennsylvania State Capitol.

At issue was whether the state government of Pennsylvania granting a liquor license to a private entity, the Loyal Order of Moose, was a sufficient nexus for the Moose Lodge's discriminatory policies to be classified as government-approved state actions, and thus required to comply with the Equal Protection Clause of the 14th Amendment and other constitutional provisions that regulate state action. While the lower court had ruled that a sufficient connection existed, the Supreme Court largely overruled this. The Supreme Court overturned a Pennsylvania regulation that required fraternal organizations to enforce their membership policies, but ruled that the connection was too distant otherwise, and that granting a liquor license did not qualify as state action.

== Background ==
=== Leroy Irvis and the Loyal Order of Moose ===
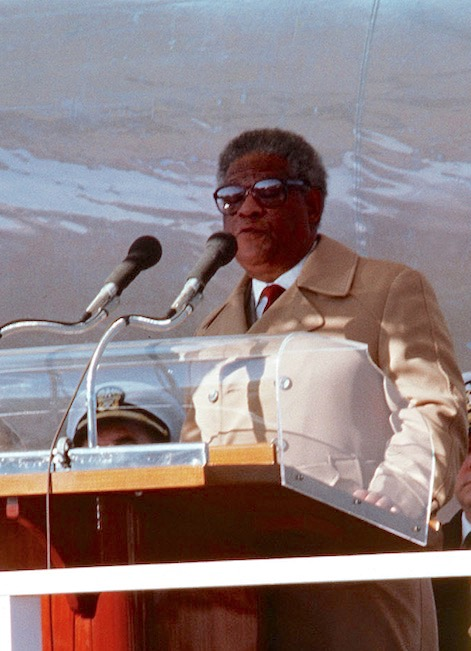
A 1985 photograph of K. Leroy Irvis

The Loyal Order of Moose, a fraternal organization, operated a facility on State Street in Harrisburg, Pennsylvania in close proximity to the Pennsylvania State Capitol. At the time, the bylaws restricted membership to Caucasian (white) males. Non-members could still enter, as long as they were guests of a member. A Caucasian member in good standing brought in K. Leroy Irvis, a black man and member of the Pennsylvania House of Representatives, as a guest; both were refused service.

Irvis brought suit, alleging that the liquor license granted by the Pennsylvania Liquor Control Board made the Moose Lodge effectively a state actor and thus in violation of the Equal Protection Clause. In the era, a liquor license was not a meaningless formality, but rather a matter of heavy regulation. He asked that the state revoke the liquor license until the Moose Lodge ended its discriminatory policies. The District Court for the Middle District of Pennsylvania found in favor of Irvis; Moose Lodge appealed; and the case reached the Supreme Court.

The Supreme Lodge of the Moose adjusted their bylaws after the court loss to explicitly require that guests of members be subject to the same racial requirements as applicants to membership, making exclusion of black guests a matter of policy. Pennsylvania law at the time required that private clubs enforce their membership requirements so as to avoid 'clubs' that were actually normal stores. Still, it was understood that some establishments sought to evade anti-discrimination requirements from civil rights legislation under the guise of being a "private club".

=== Relevant law ===
A core assumption in much of the text of the Constitution is that it constrains state action by default, not private action. As an example, freedom of speech and freedom of the press in the 1st Amendment apply to governments, not individuals (an issue that arose in Lloyd Corp. v. Tanner, another 1972 case on the scope of state action). There are a few exceptions, but they are generally made explicit, such as the 13th Amendment directly prohibiting private entities from holding slaves.

There is a borderline area, especially when a state hires, commissions, encourages, or approves of certain actions. As of 1972, the most recent and relevant case on the scope of what qualifies as state action in such a circumstance was Burton v. Wilmington Parking Authority (1961). In it, William H. Burton, a black city councilman in Delaware, attempted to order coffee at a private coffee shop attached to a facility operated by a government agency. He was refused service due to his race. The Warren Court ruled that the government being the private coffee shop's landlord was enough of a nexus between private and state action to trigger the Equal Protection Clause as applying.

== Opinion ==
The majority opinion was written by Justice William Rehnquist and joined by five other justices. The Court ruled 6–3 that the granting of a liquor license by the Liquor Control Board was insufficient to qualify the private club's discriminatory practices as state action, and thus the 14th Amendment did not apply.

Rehnquist distinguished this case from Burton v. Wilmington Parking Authority by noting that the coffee shop in that case was involved in a more "symbiotic" relationship with its government-owned host (which easily could have run a food shop directly if so desired), and was theoretically open to the public. In contrast, the Moose fraternity was ostensibly a private club that restricted membership with dues, initiation and indoctrination ceremonies, and so on. The state did not particularly benefit financially from the club's success beyond standard licensing fees.

While Rehnquist and the Court found that the liquor licensing scheme as a whole was not enough to trigger the Equal Protection Clause, it did find for the plaintiff on one matter. Regulation 113.09 required every licensed private club to adhere to its own constitution and bylaws. Because the Moose Lodge's bylaws explicitly mandated racial discrimination, this state regulation technically forced the state to enforce discrimination. The Court struck down 113.09, but left the club's liquor license intact.

=== Dissents ===
Justices William O. Douglas and William J. Brennan Jr. filed dissents, with Justice Thurgood Marshall joining both of them. Douglas's dissent focused on just how strict and controlling the Pennsylvania Liquor Control Board's system was, with a complex system of quotas and blue laws making it difficult to acquire a liquor license or sell during many hours of the day. In particular, Harrisburg's quota of licenses was already filled, rendering it impossible to simply open a new store that would serve black customers. This resulted in a city where it was substantially easier to get a drink for whites than blacks. If Pennsylvania's liquor regulations were going to be this entangled and restrictive, then it did actually qualify as state action to Douglas.

Justice Brennan largely agreed with Douglas's analysis, that the extensive nature of liquor controls and regulations did indeed rise to the level of state action. He extensively quoted the District Court's opinion, and said they had gotten it right originally.

== Aftermath ==
Moose Lodge No. 107 and Lloyd Corp. v. Tanner (1972) were seen as a narrowing of what qualifies as state action compared to Burton v. Wilmington Parking Authority. The Supreme Court also held in cases such as Jackson v. Metropolitan Edison Co. (1974), Flagg Bros., Inc. v. Brooks (1978), Rendell-Baker v. Kohn (1982), and Blum v. Yaretsky (1982) that there was an insufficient connection between the mixed public-private entity and state action. However, some ground remains for holding private entities to such constitutional provisions. Edmonson v. Leesville Concrete Co. (1991) was a case where lawyers for a private concrete company used racially-motivated reasons to strike jurors during jury selection, and the court found that this was more a matter of government regulation of courts than a private entity expressing a personal preference. Georgia v. McCollum (1992) was a similar issue, except for jury selection in a criminal case. Brentwood Academy v. Tennessee Secondary School Athletic Ass'n (2001) found that a state-regulated sports league qualified as a state actor.

Moose Lodge No. 107 no longer operates the original State Street location and now is in nearby Marysville, Pennsylvania instead. The national organization dropped its whites-only policy in 1973.
