= H. Jack Seltzer =

American politician (1922–2011)

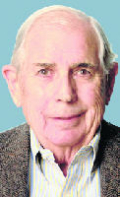

80th Speaker of the Pennsylvania House of Representatives

Member of the Pennsylvania House of Representatives
- In office January 2, 1979 – January 6, 1981
- Preceded by: K. Leroy Irvis
- Succeeded by: Matthew J. Ryan

Member of the Pennsylvania House of Representatives

Republican Leader of the Pennsylvania House of Representatives
- In office December 15, 1977 – November 30, 1978
- Preceded by: Robert Burtera
- Succeeded by: Matt Ryan

Member of the Pennsylvania House of Representatives from the 101st district
- In office January 7, 1969 – November 19, 1980
- Preceded by: District created
- Succeeded by: George Jackson

Member of the Pennsylvania House of Representatives from the Lebanon County district
- In office January 1, 1957 – November 30, 1968

Personal details
- Born: August 12, 1922 Philadelphia, Pennsylvania
- Died: February 28, 2011 (aged 88) Scottsdale, Arizona
- Party: Republican
- Spouse: Geneva S. Seltzer
- Children: Michael J. (d. June 5, 1983), Craig H., Pamela Shepard, Patricia D. Wagoner

H. Jack Seltzer (August 12, 1922 – February 28, 2011) was a Speaker of the Pennsylvania House of Representatives and owner of Seltzer's Lebanon Bologna Company. Seltzer was first elected to the Pennsylvania House of Representatives in 1957. He was the first Speaker of the Pennsylvania House from Lebanon County. He died on February 28, 2011, at the age of 88.

== Formative years and family ==
Harvey Jack Seltzer was born in Philadelphia, Pennsylvania, on August 12, 1922. He grew up in Harrisburg and Palmyra.

He attended high school at Mercersburg Academy before enlisting in the United States Navy, serving as a petty officer first class in the Pacific during World War II.

He met his wife, Geneva Shepherd, while stationed in Jacksonville, Florida. They married in 1945, and moved to Palmyra after the war. He and his wife were married for sixty-five years, and had four children: Michael Jack Seltzer, who died in 1983, Craig Harvey Seltzer, who married Donna Curanzy, Pamela Shepherd, and Patricia Wagoner, who married Rolf Wagoner. Seltzer and his wife also had four grandchildren: Owen Michael Seltzer, Noah Michael Wagoner, Peter Austin Wagoner, and Geneva Esther Wagoner.

== Business and legislative career ==
After the war, Seltzer reopened the family business, Seltzer's Lebanon Bologna Company, which had been started by his father in 1902.

He was elected to the Pennsylvania House of Representatives in 1957, and served twenty-four years, the last two years as Speaker of the House. He liked to say that he had the same job as Benjamin Franklin, who also served as Speaker of the House of Representatives in Pennsylvania.

== Later years ==
After his retirement, the Seltzers moved to Scottsdale, Arizona and also spent six months traveling around the world. He enjoyed tennis, sailing, bridge, and curling.

== Death and interment ==
Seltzer died on February 28, 2011, in Scottsdale, Arizona, surrounded by his family.
