= John J. McClure =

Pennsylvania State Senator (1886-1965)

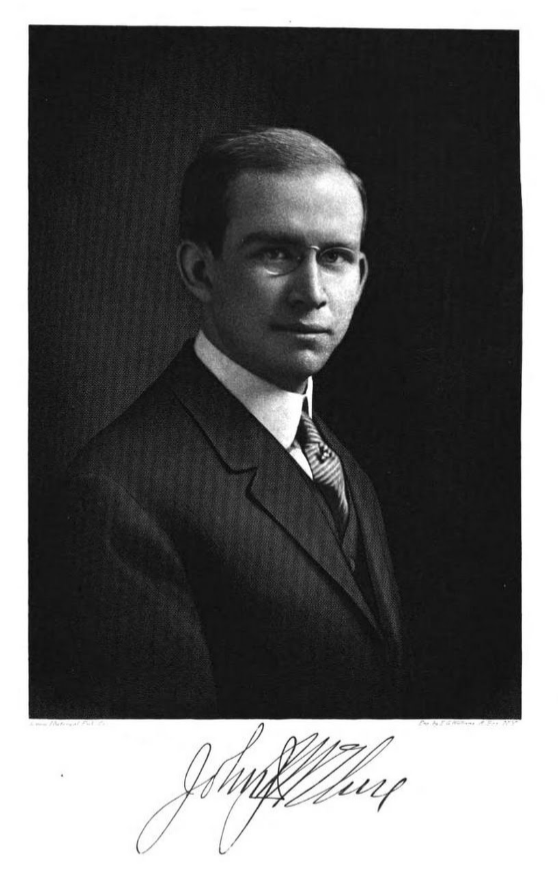

Member of the Pennsylvania Senate from the 9th district
- In office 1929–1937
- Preceded by: Albert Dutton MacDade
- Succeeded by: Weldon Brinton Heyburn

Personal details
- Born: September 24, 1886 Chester, Pennsylvania, U.S.
- Died: March 28, 1965 (aged 78) Chester, Pennsylvania, U.S.
- Resting place: Chester Rural Cemetery, Chester, Pennsylvania, U.S.

John J. McClure (September 24, 1886 – March 28, 1965) was an American politician from Pennsylvania who served as a Republican member of the Pennsylvania State Senate for the 9th district from 1929 to 1937. He was a major force in the Republican Party in Delaware County, Pennsylvania, and a political boss who controlled one of the oldest and most corrupt political machines in U.S. history. In 1933, McClure was found guilty in federal court and sentenced to 18 months in prison for vice and rum-running but his conviction was overturned on appeal.

== Early life and education ==
McClure was born in Chester, Pennsylvania, and was educated in the public schools. In 1905, McClure graduated from the Swarthmore Preparatory School. McClure attended two years at Swarthmore College but left school in 1907 to take care of his deceased father, William McClure's, business interests.

== Business career ==
McClure was president of McClure & Co., Pennsylvania Paving Co. and Chester Construction and Contracting Company and Chester Beverage Company. He was vice president and director of the Consumers Ice and Coal Company; treasurer and director of Allison Steel Products Co.; director of the Cambridge Trust Co. and the First National Bank of Chester.

== Political career ==
McClure served as a member of the Pennsylvania Senate for the 9th district from 1929 to 1937.

McClure was a major force in the Republican party in Chester, Pennsylvania, and then in Delaware County. He built one of the strongest and most corrupt political machines in U.S. history. McClure led the Delaware County Republican Board of Supervisors, also known as the War Board, which controlled county politics for decades. McClure hand picked candidates for county, city council, mayoral and school board elections.

The base of power for McClure and the Chester and Delaware County Republican political machine was liquor. McClure controlled local and county level officials dependent on Chester's liquor licensing and saloon trade.

=== Rum Ring Trial ===
On November 23, 1933, McClure and 69 associates in the "rum ring" trial were found guilty in federal court of vice and rum running. The prosecution charged that McClure received protection money and created weekly lists of speakeasies that would be permitted to operate and those that did not pay up and were to be closed. The prosecution contended that in 11 years of operation, the rum ring was able to charge between $25 and $200 a week for every illegal speakeasy in Delaware County to operate and raised $2,748,900 in collection fees.

Ships were allowed to bring liquor shipments into Chester at a rate of $1.50 per sack. An ex-constable testified at trial that he personally handed McClure $30,000 from one shipment. Between the summer in 1929 and January 1931, one Philadelphia bootlegging gang paid McClure between $65,000 and $70,000 for liquor brought through the Chester port.

In 1933, McClure was sentenced to 18 months in prison and assessed a $10,000 fine but he did not serve one day nor pay the fine because of the repeal of the Eighteenth Amendment to the United States Constitution. McClure's trial occurred after repeal had been voted on. His appeal to the U.S. Circuit Court of Appeals was upheld on this technicality and came within the decision of the United States Supreme Court that all liquor prosecutions pending on the date of repeal of prohibition were to be thrown out.

After McClure's conviction, an effort was made to remove him from the Pennsylvania Senate but it failed. McClure lost his reelection bid for Pennsylvania Senate in 1936 to Weldon Brinton Heyburn due to public outcry over his protected status and ability to avoid imprisonment. Following the loss, McClure retired to Florida but was persuaded to move back to Pennsylvania by J. Howard Pew and Joseph N. Pew Jr., owners of the Sun Shipbuilding & Drydock Company in Chester, and accept the position as Delaware County's Republican Party leader. They offered McClure funding for future elections and control over hiring decisions for all positions at the Sun shipyard and Sun Oil refinery in nearby Marcus Hook. One had to have a letter of recommendation from McClure in order to be hired at the shipyard. Republican party membership was a prerequisite to employment at the Sun shipyard and president J. Howard Pew would call "mandatory meetings" for machine-sponsored political rallies.

In 1941, McClure was indicted for conspiracy to gain a $250,000 profit from the sale of the Chester Water Works to a private buyer. McClure and four Chester City Council members were acquitted but ordered by the court to return the money to the city of Chester.

In the 1960 presidential campaign, Richard Nixon was campaigning in Chester, Pennsylvania. McClure was in poor health but due to his prominence in Delaware County Republican politics, Nixon stopped his motorcade as it moved down Providence Avenue in front of McClure's house and went up to the porch to shake McClure's hand.

== Personal life ==
McClure was married and divorced three times. One of those wives was Gertrude Holmes McClure and together they had four children.

McClure was a member of the Phi Sigma Kappa fraternity and a 32nd degree Mason. McClure was a member of the Benevolent and Protective Order of Elks and the Fraternal Order of Eagles.

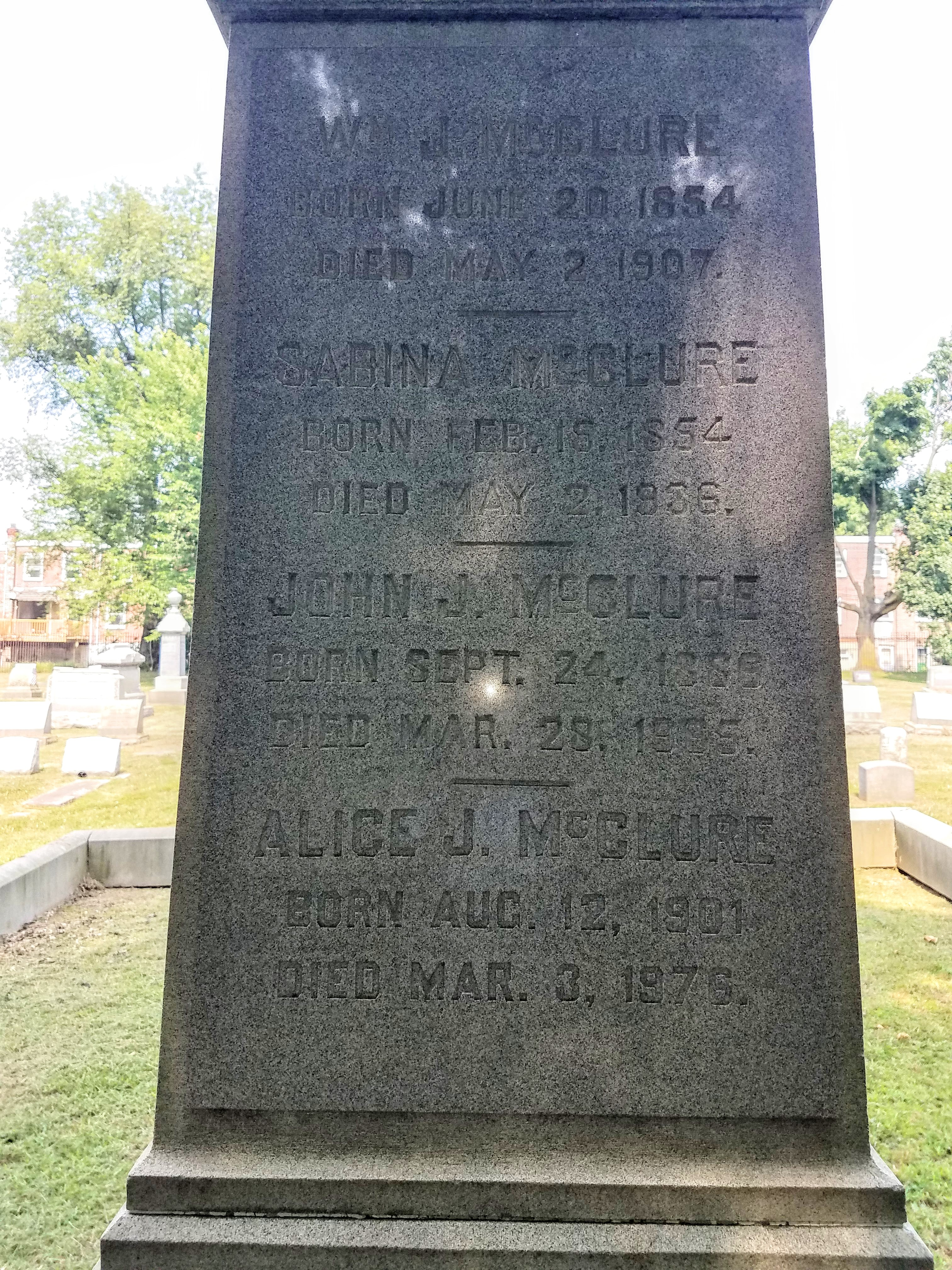
John J. McClure grave at Chester Rural Cemetery in Chester, Pennsylvania

McClure is interred at the Chester Rural Cemetery in Chester, Pennsylvania.

Pennsylvania State Senate
Preceded by Albert Dutton MacDade	Member of the Pennsylvania Senate 9th District; 1929-1937	Succeeded by Weldon Brinton Heyburn
