= K. Leroy Irvis =

American politician (1919–2006)

Kirkland Leroy Irvis
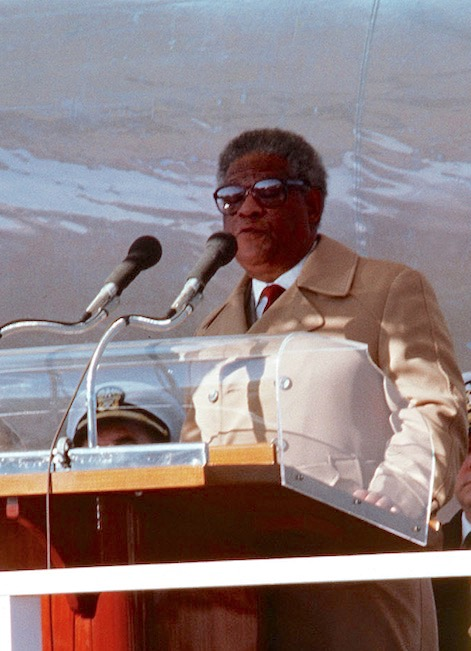
- K. Leroy Irvis, speaker of the Pennsylvania House of Representatives, delivers a speech November 23, 1985.

79th Speaker of the Pennsylvania House of Representatives
- In office May 23, 1977 – January 2, 1979
- Preceded by: Herbert Fineman
- Succeeded by: Jack Seltzer
- In office January 4, 1983 – November 30, 1988
- Preceded by: Matt Ryan
- Succeeded by: James Manderino

Member of the Pennsylvania House of Representatives from the 19th district
- In office January 7, 1969 – November 30, 1988
- Preceded by: District created
- Succeeded by: William Russell Robinson

Member of the Pennsylvania House of Representatives from the Allegheny County district
- In office January 6, 1959 – November 30, 1968

Personal details
- Born: December 27, 1919 Saugerties, New York, U.S.
- Died: March 16, 2006 (aged 86) Pittsburgh, Pennsylvania, U.S.
- Resting place: Allegheny Cemetery
- Party: Democratic
- Spouse(s): Katharyne Jones, Cathryn L. Edwards
- Profession: Politician; Teacher

Kirkland Leroy Irvis (December 27, 1919 – March 16, 2006) was an American educator, activist and politician in Pennsylvania. The first African American to serve as a speaker of the house in any state legislature in the United States since Reconstruction (John Roy Lynch (1847–1939) of Mississippi had been the first African American to hold that position), Irvis was a Democrat who represented Pittsburgh in the Pennsylvania House of Representatives from 1958–1988.

== Early life ==
Kirkland Leroy Irvis was born in 1919 in Saugerties, New York, son of Francis H. and Harriet Irvis. He attended local schools. He went to college, graduating summa cum laude in 1938 from the University of New York State Teachers College (now State University of New York at Albany) with a master's degree in education, the second black American to graduate from that college. During his degree, Irvis took classes with the folklorist Harold W Thompson, who praised Irvis for his collection of African American folklore. Irvis moved to Baltimore, Maryland, where he taught English and history in high schools until World War II. He was hired as a civilian flying instructor in the War Department.

== Pennsylvania career ==
After World War II, Irvis moved to Pittsburgh, Pennsylvania. There he worked as the public relations secretary for the local chapter of the Urban League. While with the Urban League, he led a demonstration in 1947 against Jim Crow employment discrimination by Pittsburgh's department stores. This was the first demonstration of its kind in American history.

Irvis became an entrepreneur for a time, managing a toy factory and a hot dog stand. In 1950, he left his businesses and pursued blue-collar work in steel mills and road construction, to earn money in order to go to law school.

In 1954 he earned a law degree from University of Pittsburgh School of Law. He worked as law clerk to Judge Anne X. Alpern, was hired as Pittsburgh city solicitor, and advanced to become the second black assistant district attorney of Allegheny County, Pennsylvania, the first being Oliver Livingstone Johnson who was appointed in February 1942 by District Attorney Russell H. Adams. He supplemented his income as a radio announcer for WILY-AM. When his reputation had grown, he opened a private law practice downtown.

Irvis entered politics and was elected as the state representative from Pittsburgh's Hill District, serving in the legislature for 15 straight terms. Rep. Irvis sponsored more than 1600 bills, and is most known for bills promoting civil rights, fair housing, education, public health, highway safety, and modernization of the penal code. In 1972, after being denied accommodation by the Harrisburg, Pennsylvania-based Moose Lodge as the guest of a white member, Irvis was party to a case in the U.S. Supreme Court, Moose Lodge No. 107 v. Irvis, in which the Court upheld the right of the Moose Lodge to discriminate as a private club on the basis of race; the racial discrimination policy was ended by Moose International Inc. within a year of the Supreme Court ruling. In 1977 he was voted unanimously by the representatives for the role of speaker of the house.

His most noted achievements include the passage of legislation creating the Pennsylvania Human Relations Commission, the Pennsylvania Higher Education Assistance Agency and Equal Opportunity Program, the state's community college system, the Minority Business Development Authority, and the Pennsylvania Council on the Arts. He is also largely responsible for the Pennsylvania House Ethics Committee, lobbyist registration, and the Legislative Audit Advisory Commission.

== Later life ==
In 1988, the same year that he retired from politics, Irvis published collected poems under the title This Land of Fire (ISBN 0-943556-01-5), issued by Temple University. He also worked in making wood sculptures and displayed them. His wood sculptures have been displayed in exhibits throughout the country.

He died at age 86 of cancer. He was buried at Allegheny Cemetery.

== Honors ==
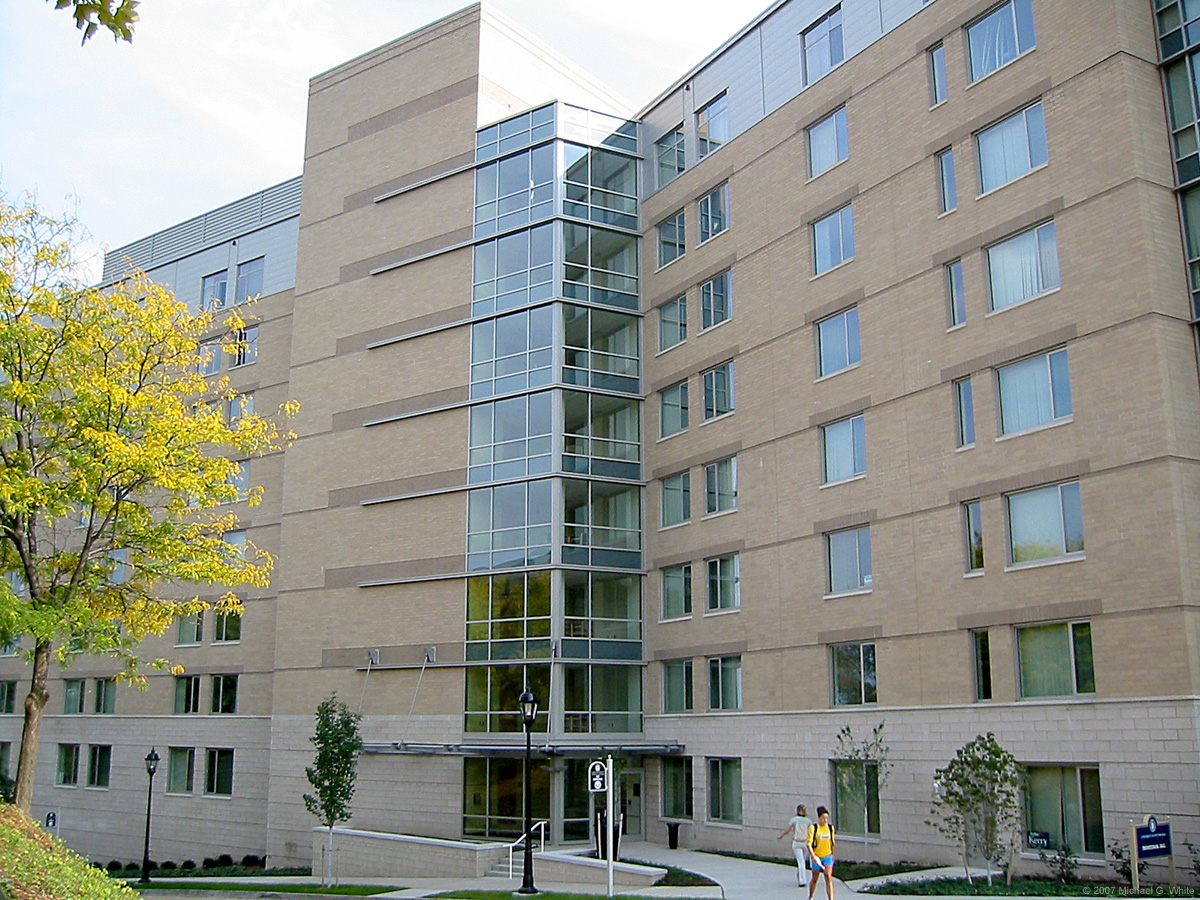
K. Leroy Irvis Hall at the University of Pittsburgh.

Among the organizations to have formally honored Irvis are the NAACP, University of Pennsylvania, Lincoln University of Pennsylvania, and Dominion Resources The University of Pittsburgh has a K. Leroy Irvis Reading Room in Hillman Library.

In 2003, the South Office Building within the Pennsylvania Capitol Complex was renamed the Speaker K. Leroy Irvis Office Building. On March 25, 2013, the Community College of Allegheny County hosted a ceremony for the newly completed K. Leroy Irvis Science Center, named in honor of his work in helping to establish the community college system in Pennsylvania and for his long career of service on behalf of Allegheny County.

In 2017, the University of Pittsburgh renamed Pennsylvania Hall, a student residence hall on its upper campus, to the K. Leroy Irvis Hall in his honor.

Pennsylvania Democratic Party Chairman T. J. Rooney described Rep. Irvis as, "one of greatest legislative giants that the Commonwealth of Pennsylvania has ever seen ... [and] one of the most admired and respected Pennsylvanians we'll ever know."

== Personal life ==
Irvis married Katharyne Jones, and they had a son Reginald and daughter Sherri together. Katharyne died in 1958. In 1973 Irvis married Cathryn L. Edwards, who survived him, as do his grown children.

Irvis was Catholic.

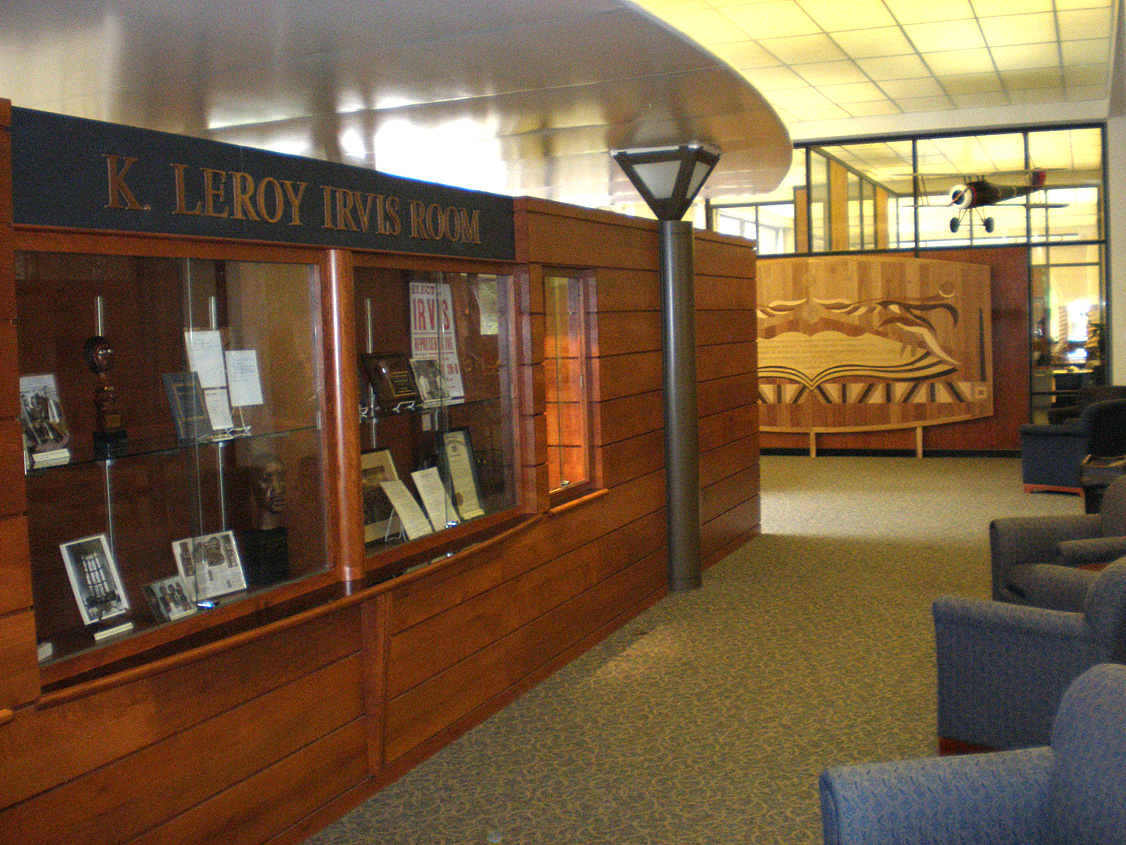
K. Leroy Irvis Reading Room in Hillman Library at the University of Pittsburgh

== The K. Leroy Irvis papers ==
The University of Pittsburgh Library System, Archives Service Center maintains a large collection of wide variety of material related to Irvis's life, career, and political activities. The collection consists of correspondence, legislative material, interviews, photographs, publications, and campaign literature. Highlights of the collection include:

- Biographical data
- Camp Hill Prison Riots - 1989-1990
- His hobbies - model airplanes, brass and woodwind bands, craftsman guilds, minority arts, and wood sculpting.
- Pennsylvania History
- Awards, degrees and honors

== See also ==
- List of Pennsylvania state legislatures

== Sources ==
- "Former Pa. House speaker K. Leroy Irvis dies", Pittsburgh Post-Gazette, March 16, 2006
- "2003 Honorees – K. Leroy Irvis", Dominion Resources
- "K. Leroy Irvis", PA House of Representatives Democratic Caucus
