= Pennsylvania's 9th Senate district =

American legislative district

Pennsylvania's 9th State Senate district
Senator
John I. Kane; D–Birmingham Township, Chester County
- Population (2021): 252,137

Pennsylvania State Senate District 9 includes parts of Chester County and Delaware County. It is currently represented by Democrat John I. Kane.

== District profile ==
The district includes the following areas:

Chester County

- Avondale
- Birmingham Township
- East Marlborough Township
- Franklin Township
- Kennett Township
- Kennett Square
- London Britain Township
- London Grove Township
- New Garden Township
- Pennsbury Township
- Pocopson Township
- Thornbury Township
- West Grove
- Westtown Township

Delaware County

- Aston Township
- Bethel Township
- Brookhaven
- Chadds Ford Township
- Chester
- Chester Heights
- Chester Township
- Concord Township
- Eddystone
- Edgmont Township
- Lower Chichester Township
- Marcus Hook
- Middletown Township
- Nether Providence Township
- Parkside
- Rose Valley
- Thornbury Township
- Trainer
- Upland
- Upper Chichester Township

== Senators ==
Representative	Party	Years	District home	Note
Richard Thomas	Federalist	1791 – 1793		U.S. Representative from Pennsylvania from 1795 to 1801
William Ross	Democratic-Republican	1811 – 1815		
Charles Fraser	Democratic-Republican	1815 – 1819		
Simon Snyder	Democratic-Republican	1817 – 1819		3rd Governor of Pennsylvania from 1808 to 1817
Robert Willets	Democratic	1819 – 1821		
Redmond Conyngham	Federalist	1819 – 1823		
Andrew Albright	Republican	1821 – 1822		
Lewis Dewart	Democratic-Republican	1821 – 1825		
John Ray	Jackson Democrat	1827 – 1829		
Samuel Jones Packer	Anti-Mason	1831 – 1833		
Isaac Slenker	Democratic	1835 – 1837		
Charles Frailey	Democratic	1835 – 1841		
Samuel Freeman Headley	Democratic	1841 – 1842		
Jefferson Kreider Heckman	Democratic	1843 – 1845		
Jacob D. Boas	Whig	1847 – 1849		
Conrad Schilp Shimer	Democratic	1851 – 1852		
William Fry	Democratic	1853 – 1854		
Joseph Laubach	Democratic	1855 – 1857		
Elijah Reed Myer	Republican	1859 – 1860		Pennsylvania State Senator for the 17th district from 1857 to 1858
George Landon	Republican	1859 – 1863		
William J. Turrell	Republican	1863 – 1865		
William M. Randall	Democratic	1865 – 1873		
Thomas Valentine Cooper	Republican	1874 – 1889		Pennsylvania State Representative for Delaware County from 1870 to 1871, 1872 to 1873 and 1901 to 1909. Pennsylvania State Senator for the 5th district from 1873 to 1874
John Buchanan Robinson	Republican	1889 – 1892		U.S. Representative for Pennsylvania's 6th district from 1891 to 1897
Jesse Matlack Baker	Republican	1893 – 1897		Pennsylvania State Representative for Delaware County from 1889-1892
William Cameron Sproul	Republican	1897 – 1919		27th Governor of Pennsylvania from 1919 to 1923
Richard J. Baldwin	Republican	1919 – 1920		Speaker of the Pennsylvania House of Representatives from 1917 to 1918
Albert Dutton MacDade	Republican	1921 – 1929		
John J. McClure	Republican	1929 – 1937		Found guilty and sentenced to 18 months in prison for vice and rum-running, conviction overturned on appeal
Weldon Brinton Heyburn	Republican	1937 – 1949		
George Watkins	Republican	1949 – 1960		U.S. Representative for Pennsylvania's 7th congressional district from 1965 to 1967. U.S. Representative for Pennsylvania's 9th congressional district from 1967 to 1970
Clarence D. Bell	Republican	1961 – 2002		Longest serving state senator in Pennsylvania history
Dominic F. Pileggi	Republican	2002 – 2016		Mayor of Chester, Pennsylvania from 1999 to 2002. Republican leader of the Pennsylvania Senate from 2007 to 2014
Tom Killion	Republican	2016 – 2020		Pennsylvania State Representative for the 168th district from 2003 to 2016
John I. Kane	Democratic	2020 – present		

== Recent election results ==
PA Senate election, 2020
Party	Candidate	Votes	%
Democratic	John I. Kane	80,198	51.9
Republican	Tom Killion (incumbent)	74,173	48.1
Total votes		154,371	100.0
Democratic gain from Republican			

PA Senate election, 2016
Party	Candidate	Votes	%
Republican	Tom Killion (incumbent)	70,764	51.4
Democratic	Martin Molloy	67,011	48.6
Total votes		137,775	100.0
Republican hold			

9th Senatorial District special election, 2016
Party	Candidate	Votes	%
Republican	Tom Killion	41,613	56.9
Democratic	Martin Molloy	31,533	43.1
Total votes		73,146	100.0
Republican hold			

PA Senate election, 2012
Party	Candidate	Votes	%
Republican	Dominic F. Pileggi (incumbent)	73,003	55.4
Democratic	Patricia Worrell	58,769	44.6
Total votes		131,772	100.0
Republican hold			

PA Senate election, 2008
Party	Candidate	Votes	%
Republican	Dominic F. Pileggi (incumbent)	77,440	58.1
Democratic	John Linder	55,730	41.9
Total votes		133,170	100.0
Republican hold			
