= Richard J. Baldwin =

American politician

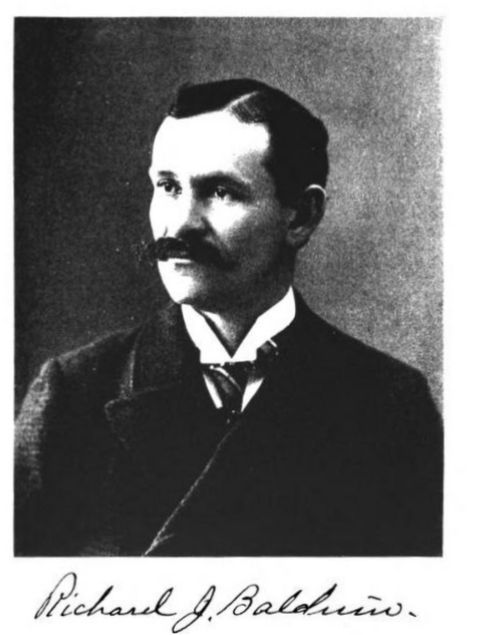

65th Speaker of the Pennsylvania House of Representatives
- In office 1917–1918
- Preceded by: Charles A. Ambler
- Succeeded by: Robert S. Spangler

Member of the Pennsylvania Senate from the 9th district
- In office 1919–1920
- Preceded by: William Cameron Sproul
- Succeeded by: Albert Dutton MacDade

Member of the Pennsylvania House of Representatives from the Delaware County district
- In office 1895–1900
- Preceded by: George E. Heyburn
- Succeeded by: Robert M. Newhard

Member of the Pennsylvania House of Representatives from the Delaware County district
- In office 1911–1918
- Preceded by: William D. Jones, Jr.
- Succeeded by: William Cloud Alexander

Personal details
- Born: March 1, 1853 East Bradford Township, Chester County, Pennsylvania
- Died: June 15, 1944 (aged 91) Elwyn, Pennsylvania
- Party: Republican

Richard Jacobs Baldwin (March 1, 1853 - June 15, 1944) was an American politician from Pennsylvania who served as a Republican member of the Pennsylvania House of Representatives in the 1894, 1896 and 1898 terms. He was reelected to the House for the 1910, 1912, 1914 and 1916 terms and served as Speaker of the Pennsylvania House of Representatives from 1917 to 1918. He was nominated speaker due to his twenty years of service in the house by the Republican political boss Boies Penrose. Baldwin also served a term in the Pennsylvania State Senate for the 9th Senatorial District from 1919 to 1920.

== Early life and education ==
Baldwin was born in East Bradford Township, Chester County, Pennsylvania to John Erskine Baldwin and Mary G. Hoopes and attended Maplewood Academy and Eaton Academies. He worked as a carpenter and at age 23 operated a general store first at Belvidere, now Whitford, Pennsylvania, and in 1878 in Chadds Ford, Pennsylvania.

== Career ==
Baldwin served as postmaster of Chadds Ford, Pennsylvania from 1889 to 1893. In 1894, he was elected to the Pennsylvania House of Representatives for the 2nd District of Delaware County for the 1895 to 1896 term.

In 1897, he was selected as chairman of the Forestry Committee and assumed the position again in 1899. He withdrew from the ticket for the 1900 to 1901 term and served as recorder of deeds for Delaware County. He was reelected to the House for 6 more terms from 1897 to 1900 and from 1911 to 1918.

In 1913, Baldwin was the prime sponsor of Act 340, which allowed certain prisoners to be released on probation if they had completed at least a third of their sentence. He sponsored Act 13 which provided for a comptroller in counties with more than 100 thousand inhabitants.

In 1915, Baldwin's legislation became Act 122, which prohibited the imposition of license tax on insurance companies. He also sponsored Act 203, which allowed county commissioners to erect monuments to soldiers and sailors of war

From 1915 to 1916, Baldwin served as chairman of the Insurance Committee. In 1915, when Baldwin was nominated for speakership of the Pennsylvania House of Representatives, the North American newspaper described Baldwin as a legislator of "unsavory reputation" and "a dupe of the liquor interests who had never attained any position of conspicuous honor or importance in the House." In 1917, Baldwin was elected as the 109th Speaker of the Pennsylvania House of Representatives.

Progressives criticized Baldwin's selection as speaker, noting his "embittered opposition to legislation on local option, child labor, and workmen's compensation." Baldwin's staunch opposition to progressive reform was such that he was one of only three members of the house to oppose the popular election of senators.

In 1918, Baldwin was elected to the Pennsylvania State Senate for the 9th Senatorial District and served from 1919 to 1920. After leaving the State Senate, Baldwin established his own insurance company and presided over it until his death.

== Personal life ==
In 1873, Baldwin married Sarah Worrall Temple and together they had six children.

He was a member of the Springhaven Golf Club of Media, the Brandywine Golf Club of Brandywine Summit, Pennsylvania, and an honorary member of the Media Fire Company. He was a member of the Masons, Odd Fellows, Improved Order of Red Men, the American Mechanics, and Patrons of Husbandry.

Baldwin is interred at the Bradford Cemetery in Marshallton, Pennsylvania.

Pennsylvania House of Representatives
Preceded by George E. Heyburn	Member of the Pennsylvania House of Representatives from the Delaware County district 1895–1900	Succeeded by Robert M. Newhard
Pennsylvania House of Representatives
Preceded by William D. Jones, Jr.	Member of the Pennsylvania House of Representatives from the Delaware County district 1911–1918	Succeeded by William Cloud Alexander
Pennsylvania State Senate
Preceded by William Cameron Sproul	Member of the Pennsylvania Senate for the 9th Senatorial District; 1919-1920	Succeeded by Albert Dutton MacDade
