= Colerain Township, Lancaster County, Pennsylvania =

Township in Pennsylvania, US

Coordinates: 39°52′00″N 76°07′35″W

- Township
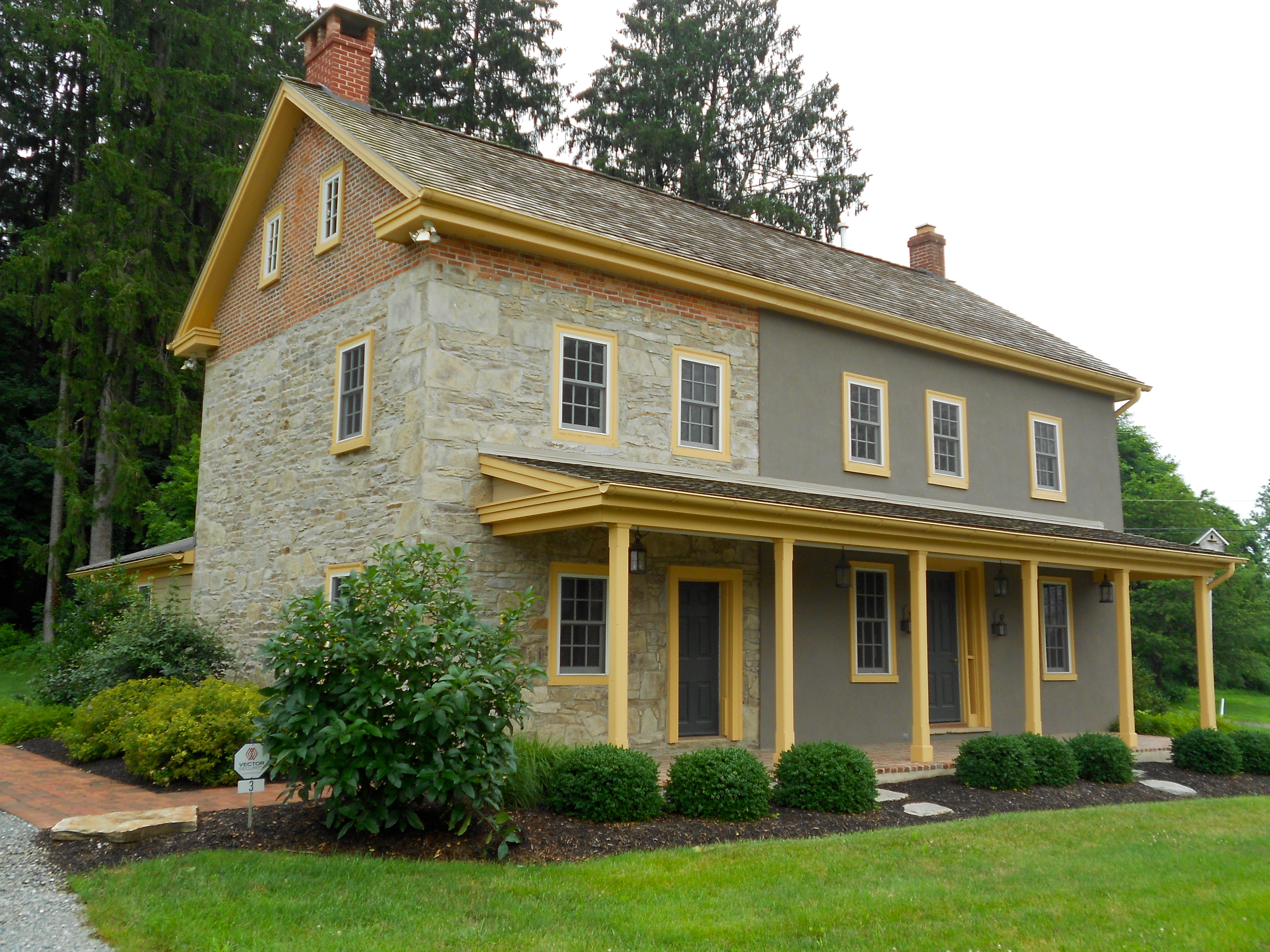
- Historic house in Andrews Bridge

- Logo

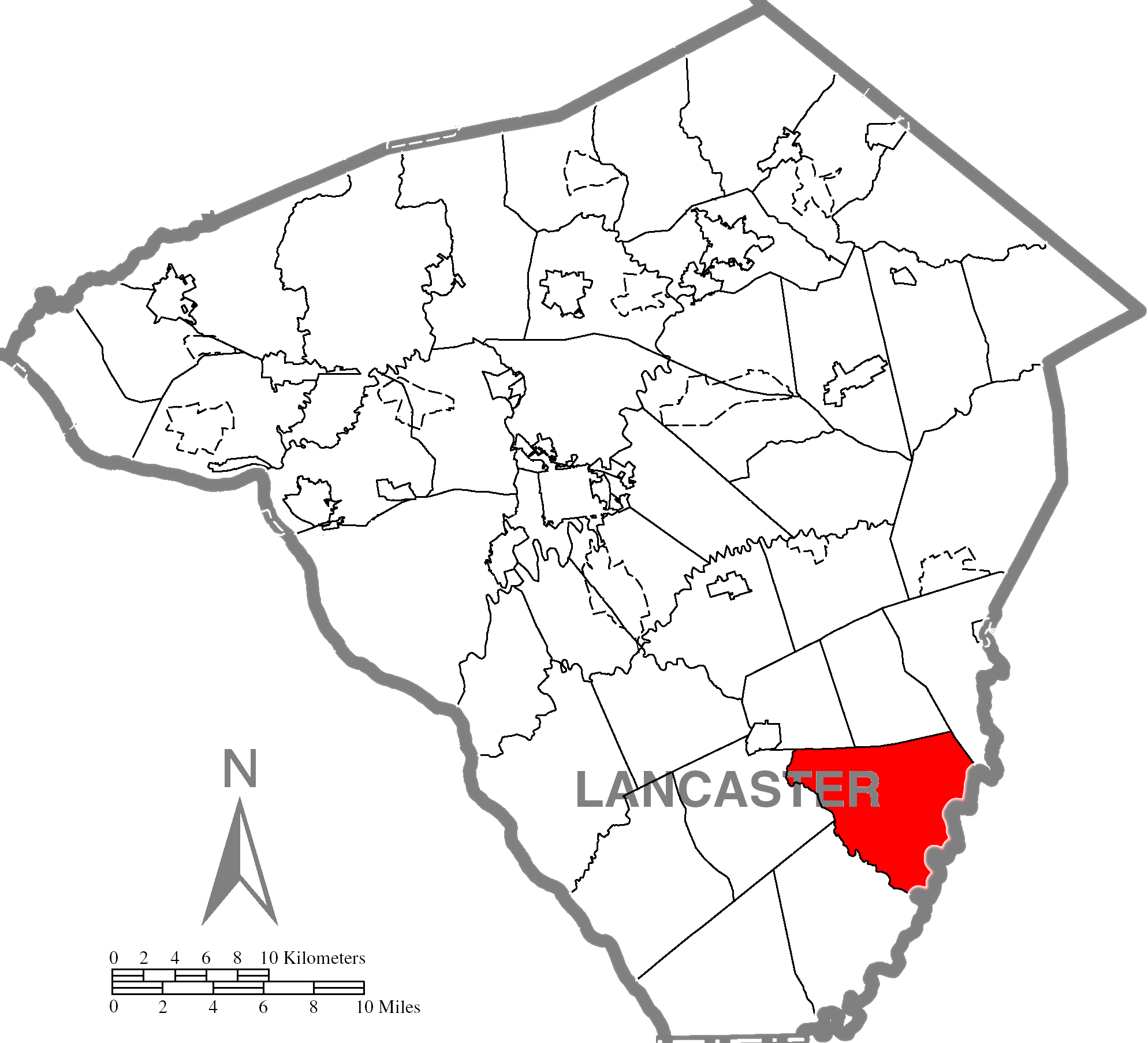
- Map of Lancaster County highlighting Colerain Township
- Country: United States
- State: Pennsylvania
- County: Lancaster
- Settled: 1758
- Incorporated: 1738

Government
  - Type: Board of Supervisors

Area
  - Total: 29.02 sq mi (75.16 km^{2})
  - Land: 28.35 sq mi (73.43 km^{2})
  - Water: 0.67 sq mi (1.73 km^{2})

Population (2020)
  - Total: 3,883
  - Estimate (2021): 3,913
  - Density: 137.0/sq mi (52.88/km^{2})
- Time zone: UTC-5 (Eastern (EST))
  - Summer (DST): UTC-4 (EDT)
- Area code: 717
- FIPS code: 42-071-15056
- Website: coleraintwppa.com

Colerain Township is a township in southeastern Lancaster County, Pennsylvania, United States. The population was 3,883 at the 2020 census, an increase over the figure of 3,635 tabulated in 2010. It is part of the Solanco School District.

Colerain Township was organized as a township in 1738. It was settled mainly by the Irish and was named after Coleraine, a seaport town in County Londonderry, now in Northern Ireland. Records show that Presbyterian Scots and Scotch-Irish also moved into Colerain Township very early into its settlement.

According to the 2020 "ACS 5-Year Estimates Data Profiles", 61.8% of the township's population spoke only English, while 38.1 spoke an "other [than Spanish] Indo-European language" (basically Pennsylvania German/German).

== History ==
The White Rock Forge Covered Bridge, John Douglass House, and Andrews Bridge Historic District are listed on the National Register of Historic Places.

== Notable people ==
- John A. Reynolds (1820–1889), member of the Pennsylvania House of Representatives
- William Cameron Sproul, governor of Pennsylvania (1919–1923), born in the John Douglass House in 1870

== Geography ==
According to the United States Census Bureau, the township has a total area of 29.4 square miles (76 km^{2}), of which 28.8 square miles (75 km^{2}) are land and 0.6 square miles (1.6 km^{2}), or 2.07%, are water. It includes the communities of Collins, Andrews Bridge, Kirkwood, and Union.

== Demographics ==
Historical population
Census	Pop.	Note	%±
1980	2,118		—
1990	2,867		35.4%
2000	3,261		13.7%
2010	3,635		11.5%
2020	3,883		6.8%
2021 (est.)	3,913		0.8%
U.S. Decennial Census 2020

As of the census of 2000, there were 3,261 people, 964 households, and 840 families residing in the township. The population density was 113.3 inhabitants per square mile (43.7/km^{2}). There were 989 housing units at an average density of 34.3 per square mile (13.2/km^{2}). The racial makeup of the township was 97.82% White, 0.67% African American, 0.03% Native American, 0.12% Asian, 0.58% from other races, and 0.77% from two or more races. Hispanic or Latino of any race were 0.92% of the population.

There were 964 households, out of which 44.4% had children under the age of 18 living with them, 78.8% were married couples living together, 5.7% had a female householder with no husband present, and 12.8% were non-families. 10.8% of all households were made up of individuals, and 4.7% had someone living alone who was 65 years of age or older. The average household size was 3.38 and the average family size was 3.66.

In the township the population was spread out, with 36.2% under the age of 18, 9.2% from 18 to 24, 23.5% from 25 to 44, 22.2% from 45 to 64, and 8.9% who were 65 years of age or older. The median age was 30 years. For every 100 females there were 101.8 males. For every 100 females age 18 and over, there were 94.8 males.

The median income for a household in the township was $47,008, and the median income for a family was $50,545. Males had a median income of $31,917 versus $23,553 for females. The per capita income for the township was $15,626. About 8.4% of families and 11.4% of the population were below the poverty line, including 16.9% of those under age 18 and 1.8% of those age 65 or over.
