= Senator Hoge =

Senator Hoge may refer to:

- John Hoge (1851 Pennsylvania legislator) (fl. 1850s), Pennsylvania State Senate
- Thomas Hoge (1808–1885), Pennsylvania State Senate

== See also ==
- Senator Hogue (disambiguation)
