= Charles Sullivan =

Charles Sullivan may refer to:

- Charles Sullivan (musician) (born 1944), American jazz trumpeter
- Charles Sullivan (actor) (1899–1972), American actor
- Charles Sullivan (promoter) (1909–1966), American promoter
- Charles Craven Sullivan (1807–1860), American politician from Pennsylvania
- Charles F. Sullivan (1904–1962), lieutenant governor for the Commonwealth of Massachusetts, 1949–1953
- Charles L. Sullivan (1924–1979), lieutenant governor of Mississippi, 1968–1972, general in the U.S. Air National Guard
- Chuck Sullivan (Charles William Sullivan, 1942–2026), American football executive
- Charles Thompson Sullivan (1882–1948), Canadian mathematician
- Charles A. Sullivan, lawyer and state legislator in Mississippi
- Charles P. Sullivan (1886–1956), American lawyer and politician from New York

== See also ==
- Charlie Sullivan (disambiguation)
