= Stutzman =

Stutzman or Stutzmann is a surname of Swiss German origin. Notable people with the name include:

- Alexander Stutzman (1820–1900), American politician from Pennsylvania
- Barronelle Stutzman (born 1945), American florist
- Christy Stutzman (born 1973), American businesswoman and politician from Indiana
- Craig Stutzmann (born 1980), American football coach and player
- Marlin Stutzman (born 1976), American politician from Indiana
- Matt Stutzman (born 1982), American athlete who competes in archery
- Nathalie Stutzmann (born 1965), French contralto and conductor
- Preston Stutzman, American film producer and actor

== See also ==
- Stutsman (disambiguation)
