= Householder =

Householder may refer to:

- Householder, a person who is the head of a household
- Householder (Buddhism), a Buddhist term most broadly referring to any layperson
- Householder (surname), notable people with the surname
- The Householder, a 1963 Indian English/Hindi language film
- The Householder (novel), a 1960 novel by Ruth Prawer Jhabvala; basis for the film
- Householder transformation, an algorithm in numerical linear algebra
- Grihastha, the second phase of an individual's life in the Hindu ashrama system

== See also ==
- Head of the household (disambiguation)
