= Dianne Herrin =

American politician

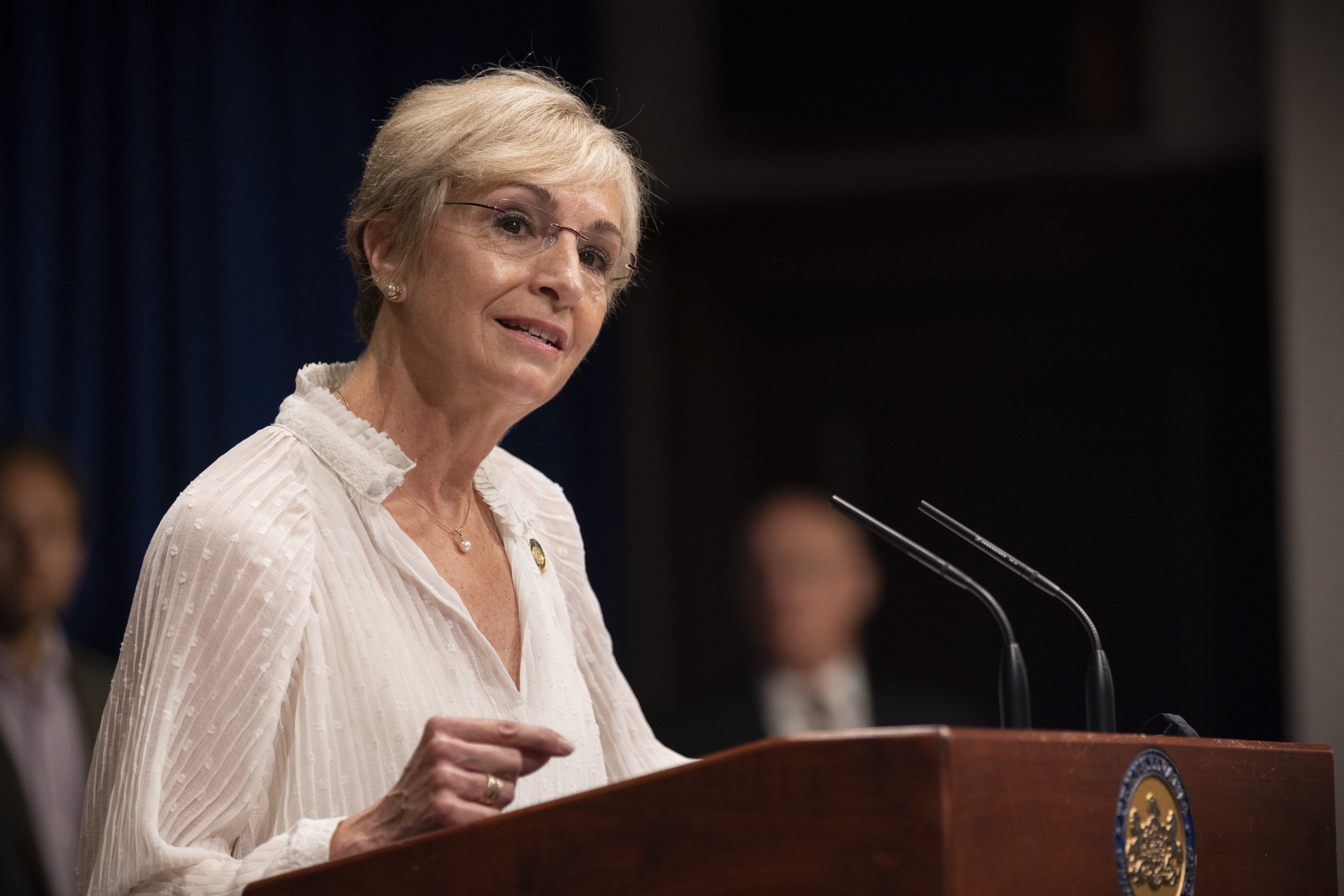

Member of the Pennsylvania House of Representatives from the 156th district
- In office January 5, 2021 – November 30, 2022
- Preceded by: Carolyn Comitta
- Succeeded by: Chris Pielli

60th Mayor of West Chester
- In office January 2, 2018 – February 20, 2021
- Preceded by: Jordan Norley
- Succeeded by: Jordan Norley

Personal details
- Born: November 8, 1961 (age 63)
- Political party: Democratic
- Spouse: Stan Herrin
- Children: 2
- Education: Widener University (BA)
- Occupation: politician, consultant, inventor

Dianne Taylor Herrin is an American politician and energy efficiency consultant. A Democrat, she was a member of the Pennsylvania House of Representatives representing the 156th district from 2021-2022. She previously served as Mayor of West Chester, the seat of Chester County, Pennsylvania.

== Early life and education ==
Herrin earned a BA in English from Widener University. She is LEED AP certified by the U.S. Green Building Council as well as a Certified Energy Manager, with an Energy Master Planning Certificate from the Association of Energy Engineers.

== Professional career ==
Herrin served as Vice President and partner at Practical Energy Solutions, where she worked for 12 years beginning in 2009. Previously, she worked for Synthes managing prototype development, and afterward formed her own company, Herrin Communications, to work with businesses in the medical device, managed care and pharmaceutical industries.

In 1996, Herrin invented the Adjustable Clamp for Bone Fixation Element with Michael Mazzio and Beat Schenk for Synthes, it was approved in 1997.

== Political career ==
=== Community organizer ===
Before holding elected office, Herrin had been involved in the West Chester community since 2004, focusing on environmental issues. In 2006 she founded West Chester Borough Leaders United for Emissions Reduction (BLUER) which became the West Chester Borough Sustainability Advisory Committee in 2015, of which she was chair.

=== Mayor of West Chester ===
Herrin sought office of Borough Mayor in 2017, she won the Democratic Primary with 61% of the vote, defeating Cassandra Jones (23%) and Kyle Hudson (15%). Herrin was the only candidate endorsed by the Sierra Club. In the general election she defeated Tommy Ciccarone Jr., the Republican candidate, with 72.41% of the vote.

Herrin was sworn in as mayor on January 2, 2018. In 2019, she supported a ban on single-use plastics, which was passed by the Borough Council. On October 2, 2020, she declared a state of emergency in response to the COVID-19 pandemic, limiting gatherings to 10 people. The order was subsequently amended to a limit of 25 people with a permit.

Herrin resigned the mayorship on February 20, 2021 after being elected State Representative. She was succeeded by Jordan Norley, who previously served as interim mayor after Carolyn Comitta, Herrin's predecessor as both Mayor and State Representative.

=== Pennsylvania House of Representatives ===
In June 2020, State Representative (and former West Chester mayor) Carolyn Comitta withdrew her re-election bid for the Pennsylvania House of Representatives's 156th district after having won the Democratic primary for the Pennsylvania State Senate's 19th district. Democrats selected Herrin to replace Comitta in the general election. She defeated Republican challenger Len Iacono in the general election, receiving 55% of the vote. Herrin currently sits on the Commerce, Environmental Resources & Energy, Transportation, and Urban Affairs committees.

On February 19, 2022, Herrin announced she would not seek a second term and retire at the end of 2022. She was succeeded by Chris Pielli

== Electoral history ==
Pennsylvania's 156th Legislative District election, 2020

Pennsylvania House of Representatives, District 156, 2020
Party	Candidate	Votes	%
Democratic	Dianne Herrin	21,914	55.28%
Republican	Len Iacono	17,679	44.59%
Write-in		52	0.13%
Total votes		39,645	100.00%
Democratic hold			

== Personal life ==
Herrin met her husband, Stan Herrin, in 1982, while they worked editing trade magazines for Chilton Company in Radnor, Pennsylvania. The pair married in 1986.

Political offices
Pennsylvania House of Representatives
Preceded by Carolyn Comitta	Member of the Pennsylvania House of Representatives from the 156th district 2021–2022	Succeeded by Chris Pielli
