= Jordan Norley =

American politician

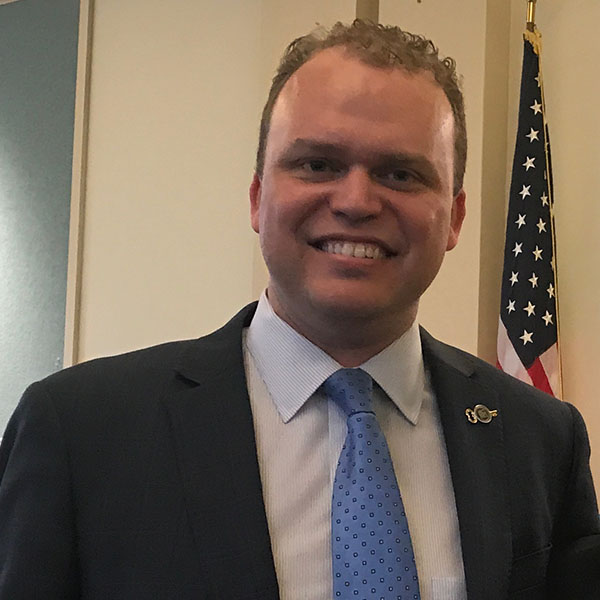

59th and 61st Mayor of West Chester
- In office February 20, 2021 – January 3, 2022
- Preceded by: Dianne Herrin
- Succeeded by: Lillian DeBaptiste
- In office April 13, 2017 – January 2, 2018
- Preceded by: Carolyn Comitta
- Succeeded by: Dianne Herrin

Member of the West Chester Borough Council from the 4th Ward
- In office January 2, 2012 – April 13, 2017
- Preceded by: Susan Bayne
- Succeeded by: Michael Stefano

Personal details
- Born: September 21, 1979 (age 45)
- Political party: Democratic
- Spouse: Rani Norley
- Children: 2
- Education: Penn State (BA)

Jordan Norley (born September 21, 1979) is an American politician and financial adviser. A Democrat, he has served twice as interim Mayor of West Chester, the seat of Chester County, Pennsylvania. His first term as mayor was from 2017 to 2018, and his second was from 2021 to 2022.

== Early life and education ==
Jordan earned a BA in Management Science and Information Systems from Penn State University. He also had the opportunity to study abroad at the Victoria University of Wellington in New Zealand, studying international business.

== Professional career ==
Jordan is a Partner and Certified Plan Fiduciary Advisor with The Philadelphia Group and co-founder of The Plan Advocate. He has been in the industry for over 13 years, focusing on retirement plan strategies for businesses and executives. Jordan is an LPL registered representative and Life/Accident/Health licensee with Series 7 and Series 66 registrations held through LPL Financial.

== Political career ==
=== West Chester Borough Council ===
Jordan Norley represented the 4th Ward and replaced Councilwoman Sue Bayne in 2012 after she stepped down due to term limits. He was challenged by Mrs. Bayne in the 2015 Democratic Primary election and won with 51 votes to her 27. He established a standing committee to return rail service to the borough and put up ‘quiet zone’ signs to remind residents of the noise ordinance.

While he was a member of Borough Council, he served as President of Borough Council, then Vice President of Borough Council.

=== Interim Mayor of West Chester ===
==== First tenure ====
Jordan Norley was appointed to the position of interim mayor after Mayor Carolyn Comitta stepped down after being elected to the Pennsylvania House of Representatives. He did not seek to retain the seat in the 2017 election, and was succeeded by Dianne Herrin.

==== Second tenure ====
Herrin was elected to the Pennsylvania House of Representatives in 2020 to succeed Comitta upon her election to the Pennsylvania State Senate. Herrin stepped down as Mayor on February 20, 2021, and Norley was appointed to be interim Mayor once again.

On March 11, 2021, despite saying he would not run for mayor when applying for the interim mayor position, Norley announced that he would seek the Democratic nomination for mayor in the 2021 election. He lost his primary bid to Lillian DeBaptiste, daughter of former mayor Clifford DeBaptiste. DeBaptiste went on to win the election and succeeded Norley as mayor on January 3, 2022.

== Personal life ==
Jordan lives with his wife Rani, his daughter Asha, and his son Dylan in West Chester.
