= Pennsylvania House of Representatives, District 156 =

American legislative district

Pennsylvania's 156th State House of Representatives district
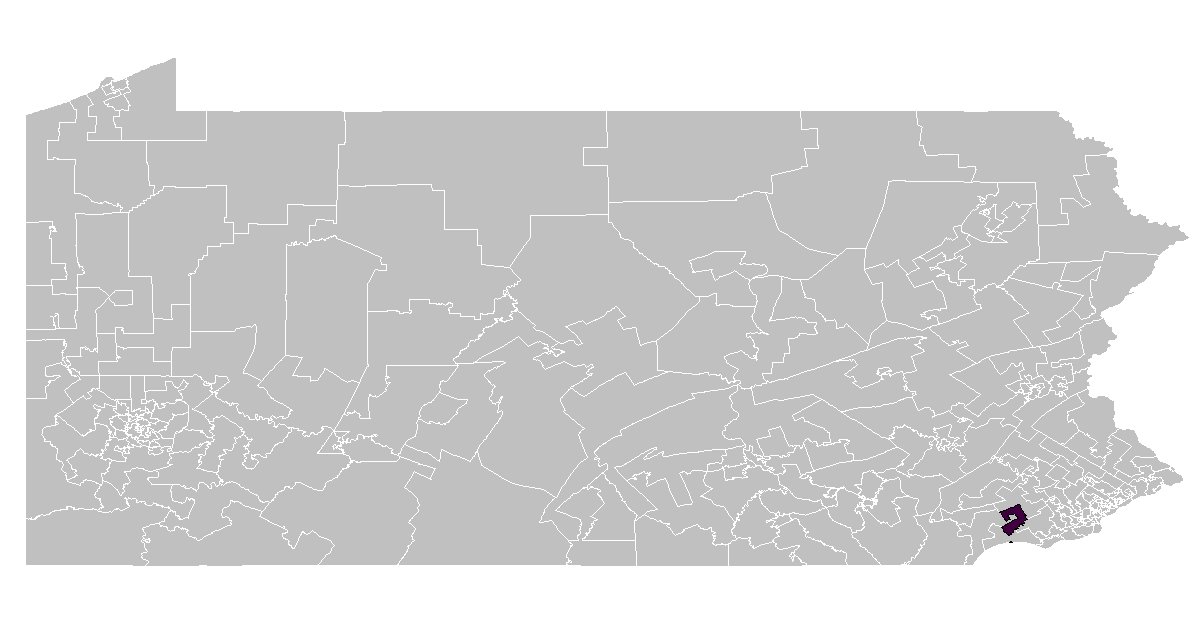
Representative
Chris Pielli; D–West Chester

The 156th Pennsylvania House of Representatives District is located in Chester County and includes the following areas:

- Birmingham Township
- East Goshen Township
- Thornbury Township
- West Chester
- West Goshen Township (PART, District North)
- Westtown Township

== Representatives ==
Representative	Party	Years	District home	Note
Prior to 1969, seats were apportioned by county.
Patricia Crawford	Republican	1969 – 1977	Devon	Was not a candidate for re-election
Elinor Z. Taylor	Republican	1977 – 2007	West Chester	Was not a candidate for re-election
Barbara McIlvaine Smith	Democrat	2007 – 2011	West Chester	Unsuccessful candidate for re-election
Dan Truitt	Republican	2011 – 2017	West Chester	Unsuccessful candidate for re-election
Carolyn Comitta	Democrat	2017 – 2021	West Chester	Elected to the Pennsylvania Senate
Dianne Herrin	Democrat	2021 – 2023	West Chester	Retired
Chris Pielli	Democrat	2023 – Present	West Chester	Incumbent

=== 2020 General Election ===
Pennsylvania State House election, 2020
Party	Candidate	Votes	%	±%
Democratic	Dianne Herrin	21,956	55.3	
Republican	Len Iacono	17,718	44.7	

=== 2022 General Election ===
Pennsylvania State House election, 2022
Party	Candidate	Votes	%	±%
Democratic	Chris Pielli	18,510	59.6	
Republican	Heidi Vanderwaal	12,537	40.4	

=== 2024 General Election ===
Pennsylvania State House election, 2024
Party	Candidate	Votes	%	±%
Democratic	Chris Pielli*	17,573	56.3	
Republican	Kris R. Vollrath	13,617	43.7	

*incumbent
