= Householder (surname) =

Householder is a surname. Notable people with the surname include:

- Alston Scott Householder (1904–1993), American mathematician
- Charlie Householder (1854–1913), American Major League Baseball player
- Charlie Householder (utility player) (1855–1908) American professional baseball player
- Ed Householder (1869–1924), American baseball player
- Eric Householder (born 1968), American politician from West Virginia
- Fred Walter Householder (1913–1994), American linguist
- George Householder (1825–1906), American politician and newspaper founder
- Johanna Householder (born 1949), American-born Canadian performance artist
- Larry Householder (born 1959), American politician from Ohio
- Ronney Householder (1908–1972), American racing driver
- Paul Householder (born 1958), Major League Baseball player and land baron

== See also ==
- Household
- Householder's method
- Ross E. Householder House
