= Senator Stutzman =

Senator Stutzman may refer to:

- Alexander Stutzman (1820–1900), Pennsylvania State Senate
- Marlin Stutzman (born 1976), Indiana State Senate
