= Purviance =

Purviance is a surname. Notable people with the surname include:

- David Purviance (1766–1847), American state legislator in Kentucky and Ohio
- Douglas Purviance (born 1952), American jazz musician
- Edna Purviance (1895–1958), American actress
- Samuel Anderson Purviance (1809–1882), U. S. Representative from Pennsylvania
- Samuel Dinsmore Purviance (1774–1806), U. S. Representative from North Carolina
- Susan Marie Purviance (born 1955), American philosopher
- William Alexander Purviance (1788–1857), American state legislator in Pennsylvania
- Helen Purviance (1889–1984), Salvation Army officer, "Doughnut Girl" of World War I
