= Clifford DeBaptiste =

American politician and funeral director

56th Mayor of West Chester
- In office January 1994 – 7 January 2002
- Preceded by: Thomas Chambers
- Succeeded by: Richard Yoder

Personal details
- Born: Clifford Evans DeBaptiste; May 19, 1924 (age 102) Sharon Hill, Pennsylvania, U.S.
- Party: Democratic
- Other political affiliations: Republican (while mayor)
- Spouse: Inez Elizabeth Manning (m. 1950; died 1990)
- Children: 3, including Lillian
- Education: Fort Benjamin Harrison Military School; Eckles College of Mortuary Sciences, Philadelphia, PA
- Alma mater: West Chester University Lincoln University

Military service
- Allegiance: United States
- Branch/service: Army
- Years of service: 1951-1954
- Rank: Sergeant Major

Clifford Evans DeBaptiste (born May 19, 1924) is an American politician and funeral director who served as mayor of West Chester, Pennsylvania, from 1994 to 2002. A Republican at the time, he was the borough's first black mayor. He is often credited for beginning the revitalization of the borough. DeBaptiste has honorary doctorates from West Chester University and Lincoln University.

== Early life and education ==
DeBaptiste was born in Sharon Hill, Pennsylvania in 1924 and grew up in the Atlantic City, New Jersey area. DeBaptiste served in the United States Army from 1951 to 1954, reaching the rank of sergeant major. DeBaptiste earned a Bachelor's degree in Science from West Chester University and a Master's degree in Human Services at Lincoln University.

== Professional career ==
DeBaptiste began directing funerals in West Chester in 1954 and opened his own funeral home in January 1965. His business, DeBaptiste Funeral Homes, Inc., had six locations at its peak but currently has two, one in West Chester and another in Bryn Mawr. DeBaptiste held positions on many local boards, including the West Chester University Board of Trustees and the board of the First National Bank of West Chester. He also chaired the Pennsylvania Board of Funeral Directors.

== Political career ==
DeBaptiste entered politics in early 1993 by announcing his candidacy to replace popular Democratic mayor Tom Chambers, who was not running for reelection. He earned the endorsement of the local Republican committee in March, and later the nomination. His opponent in the race was Democratic candidate Wayne Burton, an associate professor at West Chester University. DeBaptiste promised to attract business to West Chester and improve the borough's image. In what was described as a stun to Democrats, DeBaptiste won the election with 56 percent of the vote. DeBaptiste's campaign spent over ten thousand dollars to win the election, a record at the time.

Clifford DeBaptiste became West Chester's first black mayor, a distinction he described as insignificant.

DeBaptiste proclaimed April 24, 1994 "Clean up West Chester Day", to improve the appearance of downtown West Chester. The event is now held every year.

During DeBaptiste's term, the commercial exodus from West Chester began to reverse, with businesses that had considered leaving the borough choosing to stay, and others announcing their entry into West Chester.

DeBaptiste ran unopposed in the 1997 Mayor's election.

In 1998, DeBaptiste controversially vetoed a borough ordinance that would have further regulated landlords. The law would have required property owners to discontinue the leases of tenants who were convicted of two or more property violations in a twelve-month period. Some accused DeBaptiste of a conflict of interest, as he was a landlord himself.

In 1998, DeBaptiste announced "West Chester 200: Celebrating Our Past and Building Our Future", a yearlong event celebrating the borough's 200th anniversary in 1999. During the event, the first firework show was held in the borough since the American Revolution. The celebration also raised $400,000.

Under DeBaptiste's tenure, the borough police were criticized multiple times for mishandling minorities. The complaints led DeBaptiste to create a racial sensitivity committee.

DeBaptiste was credited for getting the University, borough government, and West Chester Chamber of Commerce to work together in each other's interests.

When DeBaptiste left office, the number of restaurants in the borough had increased by 380%, and almost fifty percent of the West Chester Police Department had joined the force under his watch.

DeBaptiste was succeeded as mayor by fellow Republican Richard "Dick" Yoder on January 7, 2002.

DeBaptiste became a Democrat during the Obama administration.

== Legacy & Honors ==
DeBaptiste is generally remembered positively and is often credited with beginning West Chester's downtown revitalization.

DeBaptiste was named Outstanding Citizen of the Year by the West Chester Chamber of Commerce in 1984.

DeBaptiste was given an honorary doctorate by West Chester University in 1999.

A plaza at West Chester University is named after DeBaptiste, as well as a lecture series.

A residential street in West Chester, "Debaptiste Lane", is named after the former mayor.

In 2022, DeBaptiste was given an honorary doctorate by Lincoln University.

On 16 February 2024, House of Representatives member Chrissy Houlahan gave a brief speech in DeBaptiste's honor while on the House floor.

DeBaptiste celebrated his one hundredth birthday on 19 May 2024. The party drew nearly one thousand guests, including State Senator Carolyn Comitta and former State Senator Andy Dinniman. DeBaptiste was also gifted the honorary title of "Mayor Emeritus" at the event.

== Electoral history ==
Mayor of West Chester, PA, 1993
Party	Candidate	Votes	%
Republican	Clifford E. DeBaptiste	1,438	56.22%
Democratic	Wayne Burton	1,120	43.78%
Total votes		2,558	100.0
Republican gain from Democratic			

Mayor of West Chester, PA, 1997
Party	Candidate	Votes	%
Republican	Clifford E. DeBaptiste	1,825	100.00%
Total votes		1,825	100.0
Republican hold			

== Personal life ==
DeBaptiste was married to Inez E. Manning from 1950 until her death in 1990. DeBaptiste has three daughters, including the 62nd Mayor of West Chester, Lillian L. DeBaptiste. DeBaptiste has been a lifetime member of the NAACP, and is also a Prince Hall Mason. He is a Christian.
