= Bop City =

San Francisco jazz club

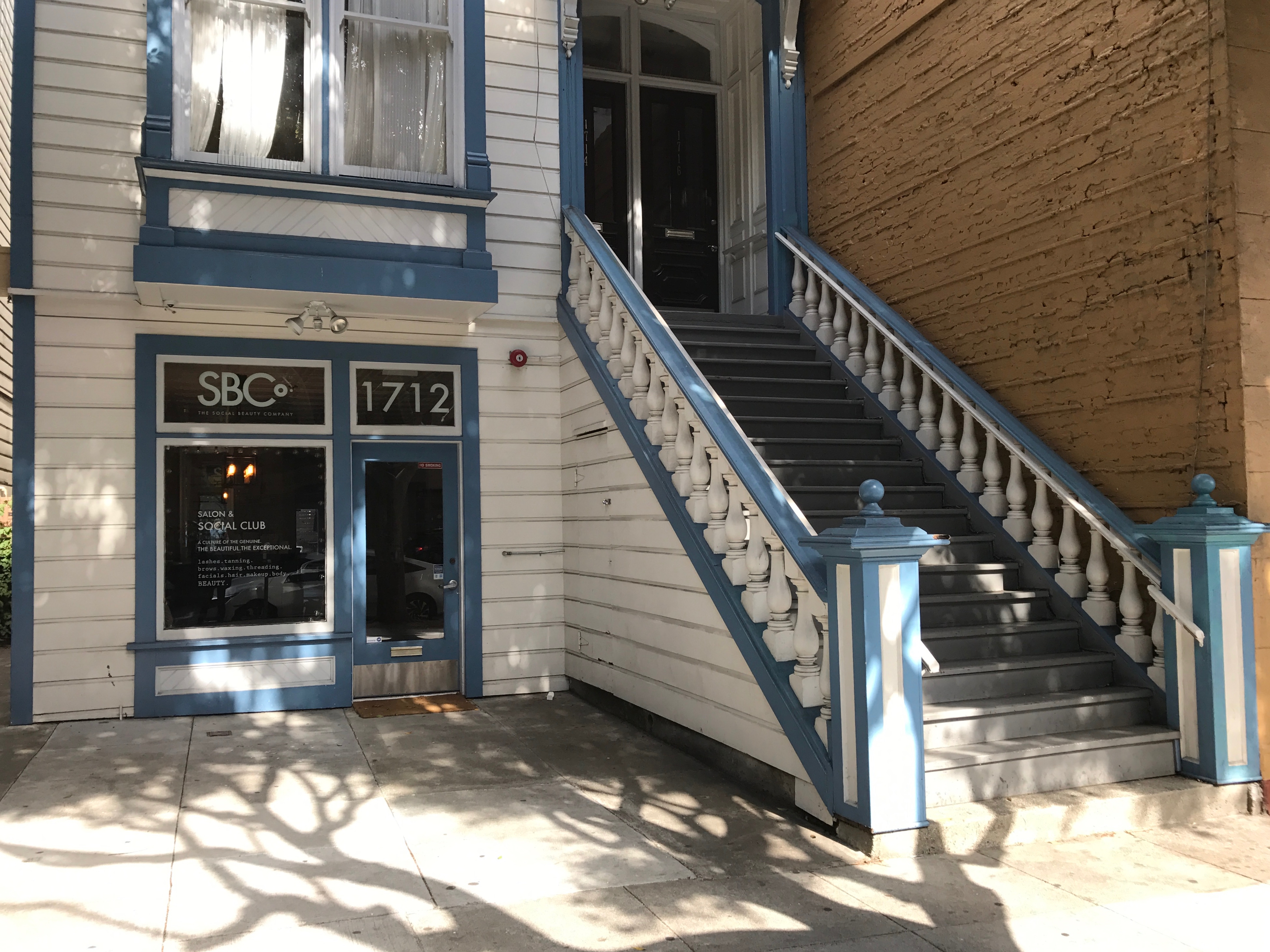
- The house formerly occupied by Bop City, now located at 1712 Fillmore Street.
- Interactive map of Bop City
- Location: 1690 Post Street; San Francisco, California, United States
- Coordinates: 37.7857°N 122.4294°W
- Owner: Jim "Jimbo" Edwards
- Type: Nightclub
- Events: Jazz, Bebop

Construction
- Opened: 1949
- Closed: 1965

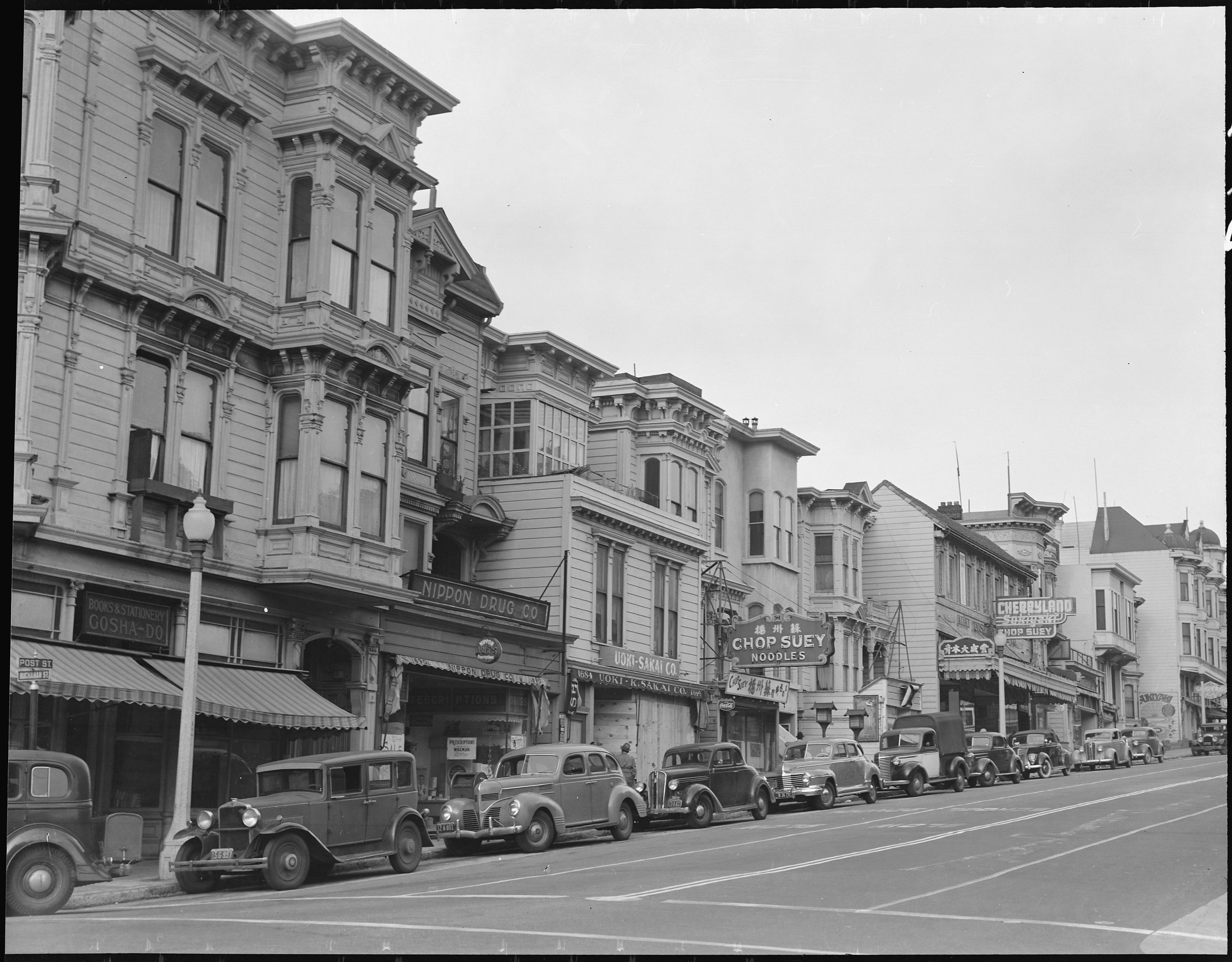
Post Street in 1942, showing the house later occupied by Bop City (with sign "Nippon Drug Co."). Photo: Dorothea Lange

Bop City (also known as Jimbo's Bop City) was a jazz club operated by John "Jimbo" Edwards in San Francisco from 1949 to 1965. It was situated in the back room of a Victorian house at 1690 Post Street, in the Western Addition district. During its heyday, the venue was known for late-night live performances of many popular jazz artists, including Billie Holiday, Louis Armstrong, Chet Baker, and Charlie Parker, and was one of the most famous jazz clubs of its time, being instrumental in popularizing the modern jazz style in San Francisco.

The club closed in 1965 when jazz began to decline in popularity. The house was moved two blocks west to 1712 Fillmore Street during the urban renewal in the Western Addition in the 1970s, where it currently stands, and has been designated a San Francisco Designated Landmark.

== History ==
The Bop City jazz club was one of the best-known jazz venues in San Francisco in the 1950s. It was located in a Victorian house at 1690 Post Street in the Fillmore/Western Addition district between Laguna Street and Buchanan Street. The house was in Japantown and its ground floor had housed Nippon Drug Store, but the neighborhood became heavily African-American after the internment of Japanese Americans during World War II.

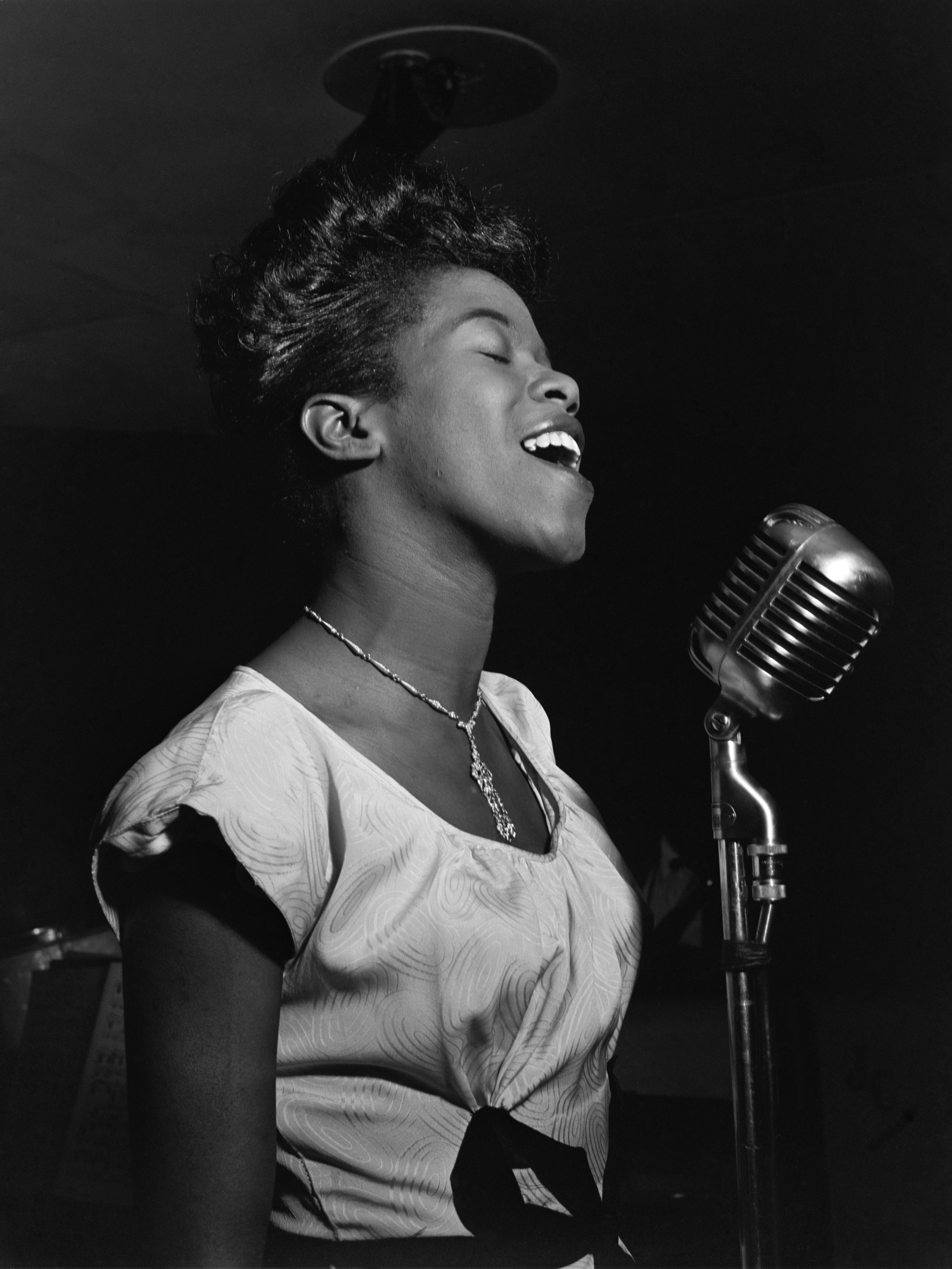
Sarah Vaughan, c. 1946. Photo: William P. Gottlieb

While modern jazz, whether in the form of swing or bebop, was popular on Los Angeles' Central Avenue, San Francisco was at the time a haven of traditional jazz (also known as Dixieland). In the 1940s and early 1950s, the Bay Area scene was dominated by Dixieland revival bands such as Lu Watters' Yerba Buena Jazz Band. In the late 1940s, however, new clubs emerged in the Tenderloin and North Beach districts, which changed the music scene in the city.

Bop City emerged from the short-lived club Vout City, run by Slim Gaillard on the same premises. Gaillard moved to Los Angeles, leaving the venue to Charles Sullivan, an African-American entrepreneur. Sullivan acquired the building and rented it to John "Jimbo" Edwards (1913–2000), who initially only wanted to open a cafe called Jimbo's Waffle Shop. At the insistence of musicians, Edwards created a function room with a stage in a larger back room.

The San Francisco club opened in late March 1949, with a concert by the Dizzy Gillespie Orchestra and Sarah Vaughan. Bop City was best known for its nocturnal jam sessions and parties, as the club only opened at 2:00 am and stayed open until 6:00 am, when all other restaurants and clubs were closed.

As a Black club owner, Jimbo Edwards realized the racial discrimination in nightclubs, where Black musicians were encouraged to play in musical institutions but prohibited from enjoying performances themselves. From two to six in the morning, Jimbo invited all audiences to his bop city to play or to simply listen and savor the music. He not only promoted integration in entertainment industries but also was intolerant of racism. His strict demeanor ensured that those who were welcomed in his club were there to listen and not spread prejudice or hate. Jimbo was known to “run a tight ship” as no fights occurred in his club, with no recorded conflict or disagreement (Chamberland). As Jimbo’s Bop City primarily served a Black audience, occasionally white performers would be ridiculed but Jimbo immediately extracted anyone displaying hateful behavior out of his club, no matter where the discrimination was directed.

Pony Poindexter described the scene:

One night, or should I say one morning, Art Tatum was honored with a special party at Bop City. There was lots of food... Up on the piano were cases of liquor. After everyone had stuffed himself or herself, we all settled back to look and listen to some real piano playing. Still, several hours went by and no one moved. It was daybreak. No one moved. Finally it came to an end. When I left there, I was spent – both from playing and listening…The very next weekend we had at Bop City the big three trumpet players of the bop style: Dizzy Gillespie, Miles Davis, and Kenny Dorham. Dexter [Gordon] was also there. The session went on till early noon the next day. Jimbo honored them all with a special dinner. The next week the Woody Herman band came to into town, and there was another party for them. That night we heard Stan Getz and Zoot Sims stretch out.

Artists who played at Bop City include: Duke Ellington, Ben Webster, Billy Eckstine, Miles Davis, Count Basie, Billie Holiday, Dinah Washington, John Coltrane (in October 1950) and Dewey Redman. The saxophonist John Handy, who later played with Charles Mingus, began here his career as a house musician and jammed with Benny Bailey, Kenny Dorham, and Paul Gonsalves. Other house musicians were the bassists Terry Hilliard and Teddy Edwards. The first musicians to play at Bop City included Jimmy Heath, Milt Jackson, Roy Porter, Sonny Criss, and Hampton Hawes.

Bop City was the site of the only meeting between Louis Armstrong and Charlie Parker. The trumpeter had come to the club after a concert of his own, to find that Parker was playing. The club's clientele also included the young Clint Eastwood as well as celebrities and Hollywood stars such as Joe Louis, Marilyn Monroe, Kim Novak, and Sammy Davis Jr.

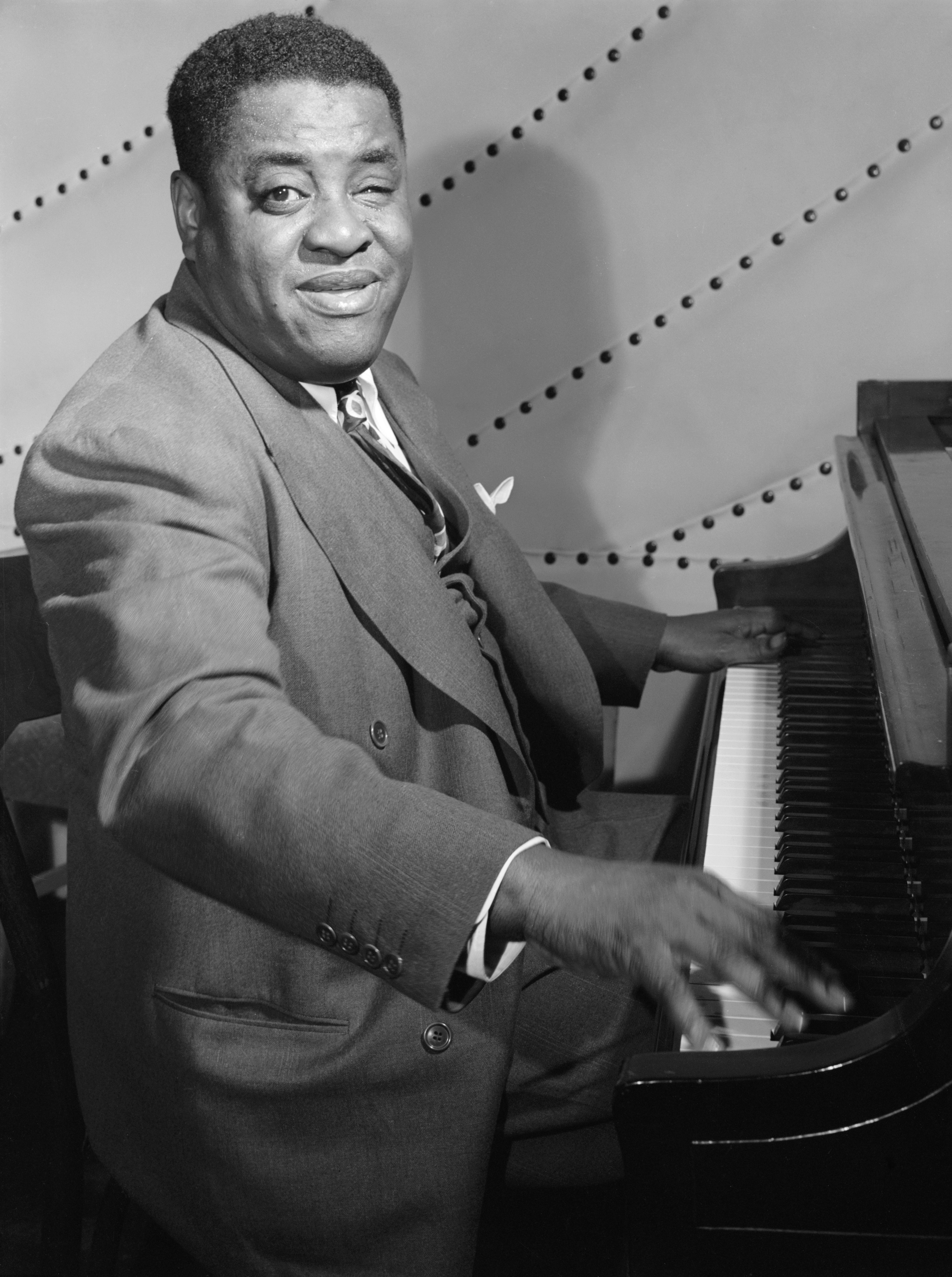
Art Tatum, Vogue Room, NYC, 1948. Photo: William P. Gottlieb

The club also attracted writers such as Jack Kerouac, and artists. The painter and film maker Harry Everett Smith painted the walls with abstract motifs and created a light show that ran to the music of Dizzy Gillespie and Thelonious Monk. Admission was only $1, and musicians came in for free, but Jimbo Edwards always chose who he let in and who he did not:

We don't allow no squares in Bop City. If you don't understand what we doin', then leave and don't come back.

The singer Mary Stallings commented on the atmosphere from the African-American perspective:

It's such a spiritual music, it really binds people together. And for that time, people that had any kind of prejudice or any kind of hang-ups, they don't even feel it. They'll sit next to each other, drink out of the same glass and won't feel a thing. I mean, that's from the heart.

== Closure ==
In 1965 Jimbo Edwards had to close the club, shortly after other well-known jazz clubs like the Black Hawk and Say When had ceased their activities due to falling interest.

As part of the urban renewal work in the district during the mid-1970s, the house that housed Jimbo's Waffle Shop was moved two blocks west to 1712 Fillmore Street. However, the back room where Bop City was located fell victim to the demolition. The house was occupied by Marcus Books, the oldest African-American bookseller in the US, from 1980 to 2014.

Carol P. Chamberland filmed the 1998 documentary The Legend of Bop City, about the club, starring Dick Berk, Jimbo Edwards, and Teddy Edwards. John "Jimbo" Edwards died in April 2000 at the age of 87.

On February 13, 2014, the city of San Francisco designated the house at 1712 Fillmore Street as a San Francisco Designated Landmark, for being the site of both Bop City and Marcus Books.

== Sources ==
- Alberts, Don (2010). The Rushing: Manbaby and the Crooked Road to the Big Time. Xlibris Corporation. ISBN 978-1450093224.
- Chamberland, Carol P. (1996). "The House That Bop Built". California History. 76. California Historical Society.
- Govenar, Alan B. (2008). Texas Blues: The rise of a contemporary sound. Texas A&M University Press. ISBN 978-1585446056.
- Heath, Jimmy; McLaren, Joseph (2010). I Walked With Giants: The autobiography of Jimmy Heath. Temple University Press. ISBN 978-1-4399-0198-4.
- Kamiya, Gary (2013). Cool Gray City of Love. Bloomsbury. ISBN 978-1-62040-126-2.
- Karlstrom, Paul J., ed. (1996). On the Edge of America: California modernist art, 1900-1950. University of California Press. ISBN 0520088506.
- Porter, Lewis (1998). John Coltrane: His life and music. University of Michigan Press. ISBN 0472101617. "bop city."
- Porter, Roy (1995). There and Back. A&C Black. ISBN 1871478308.
- Ramsey, Doug (July 1983). "Jazz in Camouflage". Texas Monthly.
- Richards, Rand (2002). Historic Walks in San Francisco: 18 Trails Through the City's Past. Heritage House Publishers. ISBN 1879367033.
- Sutro, Dirk (2007). Jazz für Dummies [Jazz for Dummies] (in German). John Wiley & Sons. ISBN 978-3527702954.
