= Stutsman =

Stutsman is a surname of German origin and may refer to:

- Danny Stutsman (born 2003), American football player
- Enos Stutsman (1826–1874), American lawyer, politician, government official, and land speculator
- Sally Stutsman (born 1946), American politician
- Stutsman County, North Dakota, named after Enos Stutsman

== See also ==
- Stutzman
- Stutsman County Courthouse and Sheriff's Residence/Jail
