= Lillian DeBaptiste =

Mayor of West Chester, Pennsylvania

62nd Mayor of West Chester
- Incumbent
- Assumed office January 3, 2022
- Preceded by: Jordan Norley

Personal details
- Born: Lillian Louise DeBaptiste November 15, 1951 (age 74)
- Party: Democratic
- Spouse: Thomas D. Lambert Sr.
- Children: 5
- Parent: Clifford DeBaptiste
- Education: West Chester University (Graduate in Psychology)

Lillian Louise DeBaptiste (born November 15, 1951) is an American politician and funeral director. A Democrat, she is currently serving as Mayor of West Chester, the seat of Chester County, Pennsylvania. She is the borough's first black female mayor.

== Early life and education ==
DeBaptiste graduated from both Henderson High School and West Chester University in psychology.

== Professional career ==
DeBaptiste has been a funeral director at her family's funeral home, DeBaptiste Funeral Homes, since 1973. The business has a location in West Chester and another in Bryn Mawr. She runs a banquet hall as well. Called Milestone Events, it is located next door to their West Chester funeral home.

== Political career ==
On February 7, 2021, DeBaptiste announced her candidacy for Mayor of West Chester. She won the Democratic primary, defeating the incumbent interim mayor Jordan Norley and a third candidate, Kyle Hudson. DeBaptiste went on to win the general election in November and became the borough's first black female mayor on January 3, 2022.

DeBaptiste endorsed Malcolm Kenyatta for the 2022 Pennsylvania Senate race.

DeBaptiste announced that she would co-sponsor West Chester's first annual Porchfest, along with the West Chester Green Team. It was held on May 21, 2022.

She also continued the Police Department Diversity Task Force, a borough committee started by her predecessor that hopes to raise trust in the West Chester Police Department by making it more ethnically diverse.

== Electoral history ==
Mayor of West Chester, PA, 2021

Democratic primary results
Party	Candidate	Votes	%
Democratic	Lillian L. DeBaptiste	997	51.87%
Democratic	Jordan Norley (Incumbent)	665	34.60%
Democratic	Kyle Hudson	250	13.01%
Write-in		10	0.52%
Total votes		1,922	100.00%

Mayor of West Chester, Pennsylvania, 2021
Party	Candidate	Votes	%
Democratic	Lillian L. DeBaptiste	2,116	63.52%
Libertarian	Beth Ann Rosica	543	16.30%
Liberty for All	Eric R. Lorgus	659	19.78%
Write-in		13	0.39%
Total votes		3,331	100.00%
Democratic hold			

== Personal life ==
DeBaptiste is married to Thomas D. Lambert Sr. The couple lives in West Chester. They have five children and four grandchildren together. DeBaptiste is the daughter of former mayor Clifford DeBaptiste, who served as the borough's first black mayor from 1994 to 2002 as a Republican. Active in her community, DeBaptiste has worked with the Charles A. Melton Arts & Education Center, the Chester County Community Foundation, and her local Planned Parenthood branch.
