= Senator Hogg =

Senator Hogg may refer to:

- Rob Hogg (born 1967), Iowa State Senate
- Robert Lynn Hogg (1893–1973), West Virginia State Senate

== See also ==
- Senator Hogue (disambiguation)
