= Head of the household =

Head of the household or Head of household may refer to:

- Head of household, filer status for the primary income tax filer for a household in the United States
- Head of the household, or Householder, a census term that refers to the head of a family unit or other household
- Hoju (literally "head of the household"), a family register system in Korea
- Kyrios, head of a household in Classical Athens

== See also ==
- Head of household, a role in the Big Brother television franchise
- Head of house, the senior member of a college
- Household deity, a deity or spirit that protects the home or members of the household
- Master of the Household, the chief operational head of Royal households in the United Kingdom
- Pater familias, the oldest living male in the household of a family in ancient Rome
- Householder (disambiguation)
