= Barbara McIlvaine Smith =

American politician

Member of the Pennsylvania House of Representatives from the 156th district
- In office January 2, 2007 – November 30, 2010
- Preceded by: Elinor Z. Taylor
- Succeeded by: Dan Truitt

Vice President of the West Chester Borough Council
- In office January 5, 2004 – January 2, 2006
- Preceded by: Diane Lebold
- Succeeded by: Steven Bond

Member of the West Chester Borough Council from the 5th Ward
- In office January 2, 2002 – January 2, 2006
- Preceded by: Shannon Royer
- Succeeded by: Carolyn Comitta

Personal details
- Born: April 23, 1950 (age 76) West Chester, Pennsylvania
- Party: Democratic
- Other political affiliations: Republican (until 2001)
- Spouse: Widowed
- Children: 3
- Education: West Chester University
- Occupation: Business owner

Barbara McIlvaine Smith is an American politician. A Democrat, she is a former member of the Pennsylvania House of Representatives, representing the 156th district from 2007 to 2010. She previously served on the West Chester, Pennsylvania Borough Council and was the Council's vice-president from 2004 to 2006. She is an enrolled member of the federally recognized Sac and Fox Nation of Oklahoma.

== Early life and career ==
McIlvaine Smith is a lifelong resident of Chester County, graduating from West Chester Henderson High School in 1968 and from West Chester University in 1995 with a degree in Elementary Education. She taught 4th grade at Penn Wood Elementary, and environmental education at the Brandywine Valley Association.

She and her husband, Robert, incorporated their business, Brandywine Water Systems Inc., in 1980. Together they owned and operated the business until his death in 2007. Their son now owns and operates the water conditioning business. McIlvaine Smith was married to Robert for 35 years. They have two grown children, a son and a daughter, and one granddaughter.

== West Chester Borough Council ==
Opposed to Chester County commissioners' attempts to raise property taxes by 36% percent and remove historic buildings to expand the courthouse, McIlvaine Smith changed her party affiliation from Republican to Democrat to run for a seat on the West Chester Borough Council, and was elected in November 2001. When she was sworn in on January 2, 2002, the Council became a full Democratic body for the first time in 100 years. She became the council's vice-president in 2004. During her tenure on the council, McIlvaine Smith chaired the Parks, Recreation & Environmental Protection Committee and the Public Works Committee and initiated a resolution to support Pennsylvania Governor Ed Rendell's Growing Greener II plan.

== Pennsylvania House of Representatives ==
In 2004, McIlvaine Smith ran for the Pennsylvania House of Representatives against incumbent Republican Elinor Z. Taylor. McIlvaine Smith lost with 45 percent of the vote, but she decided to forgo running for another term on the West Chester Borough Council when her term expired in 2006 in order to seek a rematch with Taylor that November.

Taylor announced in late 2005 that she would retire after the current term, and West Chester-area Republicans endorsed former West Chester Borough Councilman Shannon Royer, whom McIlvaine Smith had succeeded as Fifth Ward representative on Borough Council, to replace Taylor. McIlvaine Smith formally announced on January 17 that she was running for Taylor's now open seat, and was not opposed in the Democratic primary. She was endorsed by Progressive Majority, a national Political Action Committee that supports progressive politicians at the state and local levels. Unofficial returns on election day initially showed that Royer had won by 19 votes, however, after the counting of provisional and absentee ballots, McIlvaine Smith was declared the winner by 23 votes, giving Democrats control of the state house for the first time in 12 years and making history as the first Native American ever elected to the legislature. Pennsylvania Republicans demanded a hand recount, which ended on December 22 with Mcilivaine Smith being officially certified as the winner.

She is also the majority chairwoman of the Subcommittee on Special Education. In December 2007, McIlvaine Smith was one of a few lawmakers who refused to accept a pay raise from the state, saying that she would donate her additional money to charities in her district

In December 2007, Shannon Royer announced his intention to challenge McIlvaine Smith for her House seat in a rematch of their closely contested 2006 campaign. On November 4, McIlvaine Smith was re-elected by more than 2,000 votes.

In November 2009, she announced that she would not run for re-election in 2010, saying that she was frustrated with the progress of the post-pay raise reform movement.

For health reasons, the 2010 Democratic candidate withdrew, and McIlvaine Smith stepped in to run for re-election as State Representative for the 156th District. She was narrowly defeated for re-election by Republican Dan Truitt.

== See also ==
- List of Native American politicians
- Native American women in politics

Pennsylvania House of Representatives
Preceded by Elinor Z. Taylor	Member of the Pennsylvania House of Representatives for the 156th District; 2007–2010	Succeeded by Dan Truitt
Political offices
Preceded by Diane Lebold	Vice President of the West Chester Borough Council; 2004–2006	Succeeded by Steven Bond
Preceded by Shannon Royer	Member of the West Chester Borough Council for the 5th Ward; 2002–2006	Succeeded by Carolyn Comitta
