= Chris Pielli =

American politician

Christopher Pielli

Member of the Pennsylvania House of Representatives from the 156th district
- Incumbent
- Assumed office January 3, 2023
- Preceded by: Dianne Herrin

Chester County Recorder of Deeds
- In office January 2, 2019 – November 30, 2022
- Preceded by: Rick Loughery
- Succeeded by: Diane O'Dwyer

Personal details
- Born: January 20, 1966 (59) Brooklyn, New York, U.S.
- Party: Democratic
- Education: Temple University Beasley School of Law
- Committees: Judiciary, Secretary, Commerce, Committee on Committees, Environmental Resources & Energy, Game & Fisheries, Veterans Affairs & Emergency Preparedness, Southeast Delegation, Blue-Green Caucus, LGBTQ Equality Caucus, PA Black Maternal Health Caucus, Taiwan Caucus
- Website: https://www.pahouse.com/Pielli

Christopher Pielli (born January 20, 1966) is an American politician. A Democrat, he is a member of the Pennsylvania House of Representatives representing the 156th district since 2023. He previously served as Recorder of Deeds for Chester County, Pennsylvania.

Political offices
Pennsylvania House of Representatives
| Preceded by Dianne Herrin | Member of the Pennsylvania House of Representatives from the 156th district 2023–present | Incumbent |
