= Thomas Lawrence Eyre =

American politician (1862–1926)

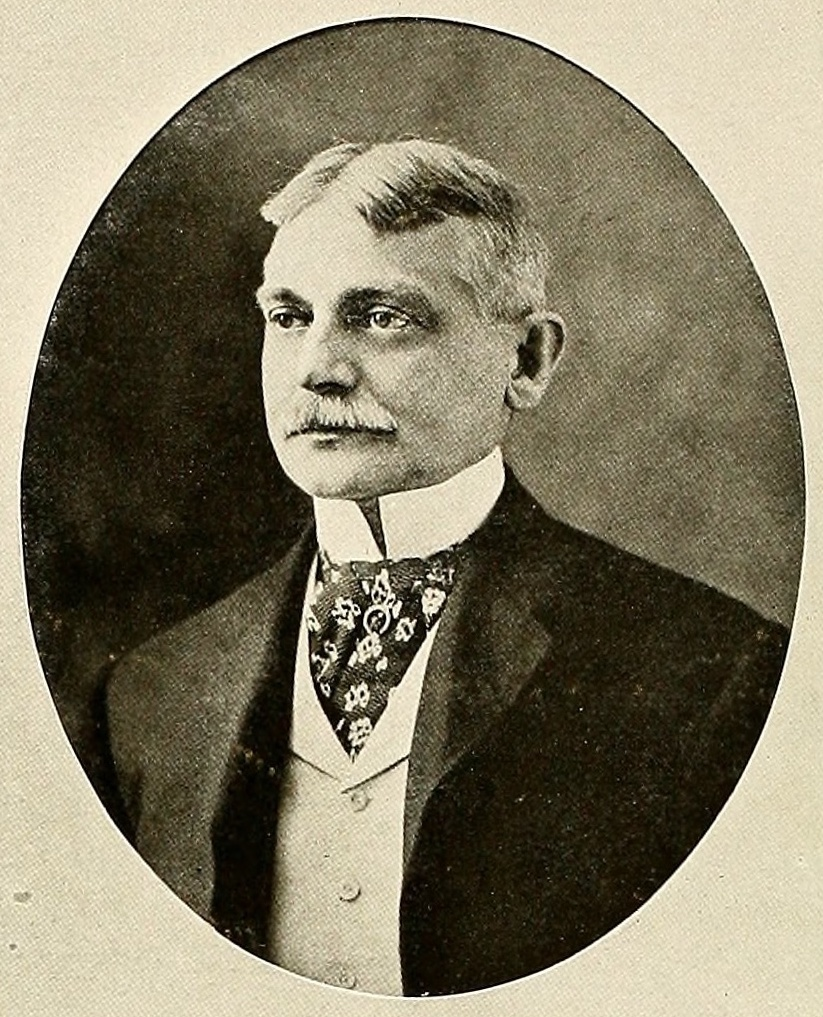

President Pro Tempore of the Pennsylvania Senate
- In office 1921–1922
- Preceded by: Frank E. Baldwin
- Succeeded by: John G. Homsher

Member of the Pennsylvania State Senate from the 19th District
- In office 1919–1926
- Preceded by: John Gyger
- Succeeded by: William Hannum Clark

Personal details
- Born: May 24, 1862 Chadds Ford Township, Delaware County, Pennsylvania, U.S.
- Died: September 27, 1926 (aged 64) West Chester, Pennsylvania, U.S.
- Resting place: Oaklands Cemetery
- Party: Republican
- Education: West Chester University
- Occupation: Politician

Thomas Lawrence Eyre (May 24, 1862 – September 27, 1926) was an American politician who served as a Pennsylvania State Senator from 1919 to 1926 and President Pro Tempore of the Pennsylvania Senate between 1921 and 1922. A member of the Republican Party from Chester County, Eyre had a long career in appointed state offices before running for senate.

== Life and career ==
Thomas Lawrence Eyre was born to David W. and Mary Phipps Swayne Eyre in Chadds Ford Township, Delaware County, Pennsylvania, on May 24, 1862. Both parents were Quakers, and his father was a grocer. When Eyre was five, the family moved to Coatesville, where he attended school until 1871. The Eyres moved again to West Chester, and Thomas Lawrence completed his studies at a normal school there. Eyre spent six years working alongside his father, and subsequently became a stockbroker in the early 1880s. He worked as president of Eyre-Shoemaker, Inc., general contractors.

By 1887, he had become a secretary for U.S. Congressman Smedley Darlington. In this position, Eyre also came to know powerful Pennsylvania politician Matthew Quay. By 1889, Eyre was a clerk for Pennsylvania State Senator John C. Grady. In July, Eyre joined the James A. Beaver gubernatorial administration as an employee of the Pennsylvania Department of Internal Affairs. Governor Robert E. Pattison, a Democrat, took office in 1891, and opted not to retain Eyre, so he joined Matthew Quay's U.S. Senate campaign. When Republicans regained the governorship under Daniel H. Hastings in 1895, Eyre returned to the Pennsylvania Department of Internal Affairs as deputy secretary. Between June 1898 and February 1899, Eyre was deputy customs collector at the Port of Philadelphia. He left the position to aid Quay's second campaign for U. S. Senate, which saw Quay's return to the office in 1901. During the governorship of William A. Stone, Eyre worked as superintendent of the Department of Public Grounds and Buildings, which included leadership of the Capitol Building Commission.

Eyre held extensive coal interests, serving as president of the Conemaugh Coal Company and Kishkiminitas Coal Company, and as secretary and treasurer of the Pennsylvania and New River Coal Company, United States Mining Company, and United States Land and Lumber Company. He also served as director of the Farmers' National Bank of West Chester and owned the Village Record weekly newspapers in West Chester. He was a trustee of his alma mater, West Chester State Normal School.

Active in the Pennsylvania Republican Party, Eyre chaired the Chester County Republican Committee from 1893 to 1894. Between 1897 and 1898, Eyre was general assistant to the chair of the Republican State Committee. Eventually, Eyre served Chester County (District 19) in the Pennsylvania Senate from 1919 to 1926, including two years as president pro tempore.

== Personal life and death ==
Eyre died while in office on September 27, 1926, shortly after returning to West Chester from a trip to Europe. He died from a heart attack at home. He was interred at Oaklands Cemetery.
