= Charlie Sullivan =

Charlie Sullivan may refer to:

- Charlie Sullivan (baseball) (1903–1935), Major League Baseball pitcher
- Charlie Sullivan (curler) (born 1968), Canadian curler
- Charlie Sullivan, Sr., Canadian curler, see 2012 Canadian Masters Curling Championships

== See also ==
- Charles Sullivan (disambiguation)
