= Elinor Z. Taylor =

American politician

Elinor Zimmerman Taylor

Member of the Pennsylvania House of Representatives from the 156th district
- In office January 4, 1977 – November 30, 2006
- Preceded by: Patricia Crawford
- Succeeded by: Barbara McIlvaine Smith

Member of the West Chester Borough Council
- In office January 7, 1974 – January 4, 1977
- Preceded by: Edward J. Cotter
- Succeeded by: Nancy Hickman Elters

Personal details
- Born: April 18, 1921 Norristown, Pennsylvania, U.S.
- Died: July 27, 2010 (aged 89) Stuart, Florida, U.S.
- Party: Republican
- Education: West Chester University; Temple University

Elinor Zimmerman Taylor (April 18, 1921 – July 27, 2010) was a Republican member of the Pennsylvania House of Representatives, representing the 156th legislative district from 1977 through her retirement in 2006. Taylor served in the House Republican leadership as Majority Caucus Chair.

She attended West Chester High School, graduating in 1939. In 1943, she graduated from West Chester University, where she later received a Doctor of Public Service, honoris causa. In 1958 she earned a Master's in Education from Temple University. At various times, she attended classes at Columbia University and University of Delaware.

She was first elected to represent the 156th legislative district in the Pennsylvania House of Representatives in 1976. During her career, she focused on higher education and constituent service. In 1982, she famously engineered a deal that led to the downfall of a West Chester University President Charles G. Mayo. She was elected Republican (Majority) Caucus Secretary in 1995 and alter served in the mostly-ceremonial leadership position of caucus chairwoman.

She retired prior to the 2006 elections with her health deteriorating. She said, "My approach has always been the idea that I could make a difference. And as long as I have been able to do that, you end the day with great satisfaction. I'm very very pleased to look back on what I consider to be a very productive experience."
