= Pennsylvania's 20th Senate district =

American legislative district

Pennsylvania's 20th State Senate district
Senator
Lisa Baker; R–Lehman Township, Luzerne County
- Population (2021): 269,942

Pennsylvania State Senate District 20 includes parts of Luzerne County and Wayne County and all of Pike County, Susquehanna County, and Wyoming County. It is currently represented by Republican Lisa Baker.

== District profile ==
The district includes the following areas:

Luzerne County

- Ashley
- Courtdale
- Dallas
- Dallas Township
- Edwardsville
- Exeter
- Exeter Township
- Fairmount Township
- Forty Fort
- Franklin Township
- Hanover Township
- Harveys Lake
- Hunlock Township
- Jackson Township
- Kingston
- Kingston Township
- Lake Township
- Larksville
- Lehman Township
- Luzerne
- Nanticoke
- Newport Township
- Plymouth
- Plymouth Township
- Pringle
- Ross Township
- Sugar Notch
- Swoyersville
- Union Township
- Warrior Run
- West Wyoming

All of Pike County

All of Susquehanna County

Wayne County

- Berlin Township
- Bethany
- Buckingham Township
- Clinton Township
- Damascus Township
- Dyberry Township
- Hawley
- Lebanon Township
- Manchester Township
- Mount Pleasant Township
- Oregon Township
- Palmyra Township
- Paupack Township
- Preston Township
- Scott Township
- Starrucca

All of Wyoming County

== Senators ==
Representative	Party	Years	District home	Note
Joseph Shannon	Democratic-Republican	1813 – 1816		
Henry Hurst	Democratic-Republican	1817 – 1820		
Joshua Dickerson	Republican	1817 – 1822		
Jacob Herrington	Democratic	1821 – 1822		Pennsylvania State Senator for the 23rd district from 1823 to 1824
Rees Bowen Hill	Democratic	1823 – 1824		Pennsylvania State Senator for the 18th district 1821 to 1822
Jonathan Knight	Democratic	1825 – 1828		U.S. Representative for Pennsylvania's 20th congressional district from 1855 to 1857
Isaac Leet	Democratic	1833 – 1836		Pennsylvania State Senator for the 17th district from 1837 to 1838
John James Pearson	Whig	1837 – 1840		U.S. Representative for Pennsylvania's 24th congressional district from 1836 to 1837
William Stewart	Washington	1841 – 1842		Pennsylvania State Senator for the 25th district from 1843 to 1844
William Bigler	Jackson Democrat	1841 – 1846		12th Governor of Pennsylvania from 1852 to 1852. U.S. Senator for Pennsylvania from 1856 to 1861.
Augustus Drum	Democratic	1849 – 1850		
James Skinner	Whig	1853 – 1854		
Darwin Asahel Finney	Whig	1855 – 1858		
John Cresswell Jr.	Democratic	1859 – 1860		Pennsylvania State Senator for the 15th district from 1853 to 1858
Louis Williams Hall	Republican	1861 – 1862		Pennsylvania State Senator for the 21st district from 1865 to 1868
William Andrew Wallace	Democratic	1863 – 1886		U.S. Senator for Pennsylvania from 1875 to 1881
George W. Householder	Republican	1865 – 1866		Pennsylvania State Senator for the 19th district from 1863 to 1864
Alexander Stutzman	Republican	1867 – 1868		Pennsylvania State Senator for the 19th district from 1863 to 1866
Hiram Findlay	Democratic	1869 – 1870		Pennsylvania State Senator for the 21st district from 1871 to 1872
Edward Scull	Republican	1871 – 1872		U.S. Representative for Pennsylvania's 17th district from 1887 to 1889 and 20th district from 1889 to 1893
William McSherry	Democratic	1873 – 1874		Pennsylvania State Senator for the 18th district from 1863 to 1864 and the 19th district from 1865 to 1866
William Henry Stanton	Democratic	1875 – 1876		U.S. Representative for Pennsylvania's 12th district from 1876 to 1877
George B. Seamons	Republican	1877 – 1882		
Louis Arthur Watres	Republican	1883 – 1890		Fifth Lieutenant Governor of Pennsylvania from 1891 to 1895
Michael E. McDonald	Democratic	1891 – 1894		
James C. Vaughn	Republican	1895 – 1902		
Patrick F. Calpin	Democratic	1903 – 1906		
Edward F. James	Republican	1907 – 1910		
Asa Keeler Dewitt	Democratic	1911 – 1926		
Andrew J. Sordoni	Republican	1927 – 1938		
Robert M. Miller	Republican	1939 – 1942		
Adrian H. Jones	Republican	1943 – 1946		
T. Newell Wood	Republican	1947 – 1978		
Harold E. Flack	Republican	1955 – 1966		Pennsylvania State Representative from 1942 to 1952
Frank J. O’Connell	Republican	1979 – 1985		Pennsylvania State Representative for the Luzerne County district from 1967 to 1968 and the 120th district from 1969 to 1978
Charles Lemmond	Republican	1985 – 2006		Seated November 20, 1985.
Lisa Baker	Republican	2007 – present		
