= Dan Truitt =

American politician

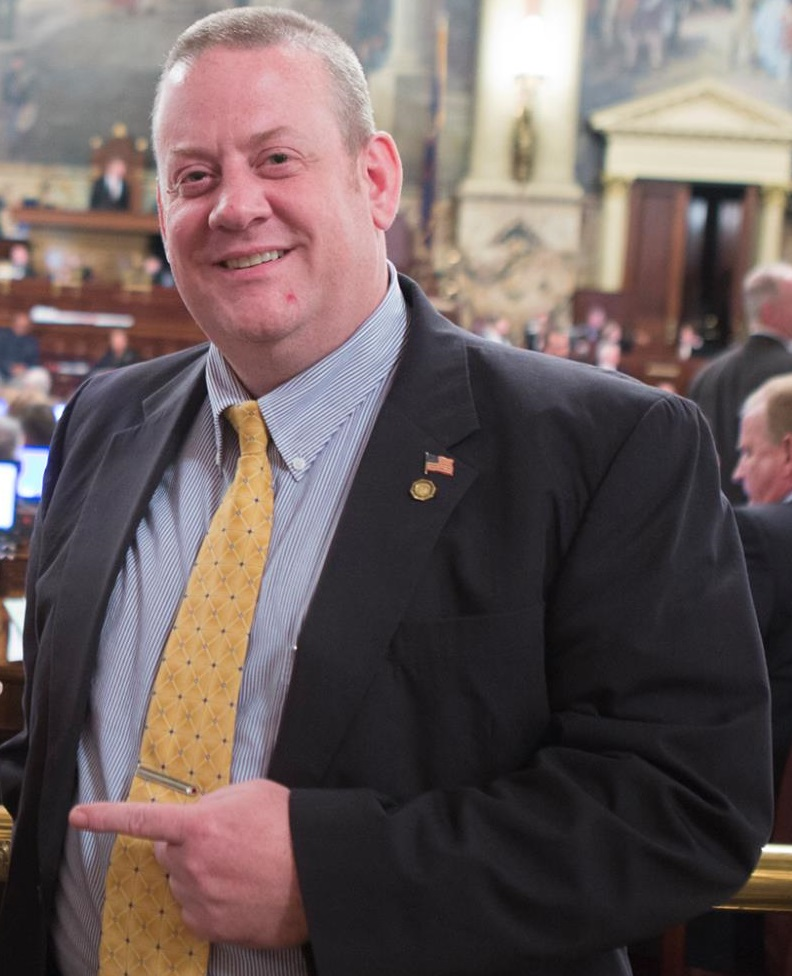

Member of the Pennsylvania House of Representatives from the 156th district
- In office January 4, 2011 – November 30, 2016
- Preceded by: Barbara McIlvaine Smith
- Succeeded by: Carolyn Comitta

Personal details
- Party: Republican (before 2018) Libertarian (after 2018)
- Spouse: Michele
- Education: Drexel University; Villanova University; West Chester University
- Occupation: Engineer, politician

Daniel Truitt is an American politician and engineer, and member of the Libertarian Party. In 2010, while a member of the Republican Party, he was elected to represent the Chester County-based 156th District in the Pennsylvania House of Representatives, defeating Democratic incumbent Rep. Barbara McIlvaine Smith. He was in turn defeated in his 2016 bid for re-election by West Chester Mayor Carolyn Comitta, another Democrat.

Truitt left the GOP and joined the Libertarian Party in 2018, and, in April 2022, became the chairman of the Chester County Libertarian Party.

Pennsylvania House of Representatives
Preceded by Barbara McIlvaine Smith	Member of the Pennsylvania House of Representatives for the 156th District; 2010–2016	Succeeded by Carolyn Comitta
