= Senator Hogue =

Senator Hogue may refer to:

- Bob Hogue (born 1953), Hawaii State Senate
- David P. Hogue (1815–1871), Florida State Senate
- David Hogue (born 1962), North Dakota State Senate

== See also ==
- Senator Hoge (disambiguation)
- Senator Hogg (disambiguation)
