= Charles Sullivan (promoter) =

American promoter and businessman (1909–1966)

- Born: Charles Williams; 1909; Mobile, Alabama, U.S.
- Died: August 2, 1966 (aged 56–57); San Francisco, California, U.S.
- Other name: "The Mayor of Fillmore"
- Occupations: Concert promoter and businessman
- Known for: The Fillmore
- Spouse: Fannie Sullivan

Charles Sullivan (born Charles Williams; 1909–2 August 1966) was the Black American concert promoter and businessman who created San Francisco's Fillmore Auditorium.

== Early life ==
Charles Sullivan was born in 1909, in Mobile, Alabama. At age 2, decades after the Emancipation Proclamation, his mother Bell[e] Mary Williams signed him into indenture "to learn the art, trade, occupation and mysteries of farming ... until he is 21 years of age." When he was 13 or 15, Charles ran away from his "master" Robert Sullivan, a Black farmer in Mobile County, Alabama, who was reportedly vicious and alcoholic. Lacking formal education, he came to California at age 19 and worked as a car washer, machinist, chauffeur, and after leaving Los Angeles in 1934 started a San Mateo hamburger stand, "Sullivan's". He prospered, operating bars, liquor stores, a chain of cigarette vending machines, and began promoting musical productions.

== The Fillmore and "Harlem of The West" ==
Sullivan owned a successful jazz club, the Booker T. Washington Lounge, bought from the colorful Shirley "Fats" Corlett. Lending money to Slim Gaillard, who started a chicken and waffle eatery on Post Street, Sullivan eventually sued and won, renaming it Jimbo's Bop City. Taking over a segregated roller-skating rink in 1952, Sullivan re-opened it as the Fillmore Auditorium. As the largest promoter of black music on the west coast, a who's who of acts, including B.B. King played at the venue. Longtime San Francisco promoter Bill Graham in his memoir says of Sullivan that he "booked a lot of the best R&B acts" such as James Brown, Duke Ellington, Bobby Bland, and The Temptations.

== Later life ==
In 1963, after San Francisco's Welfare Department sued Sullivan's for $1344.95 in parental support for his "master", now living in the same city, Sullivan made front-page news as "A Slave Living in S.F." The "shocked" Supervisor's Finance Committee dropped the suit. By 1965 the Western Addition had been declared blighted and marked for demolition as part of urban renewal.

Early in the morning of August 2, 1966, Sullivan was found shot to death at the corner of Fifth and Bluxome Streets at age 57. The murder is still unsolved. His wife Fannie and younger brother Marion believed it was murder. After Sullivan "got himself killed" in Graham's words, Graham took over the lease for the Fillmore.
