= Charles Craven Sullivan =

American politician (1807–1860)

Charles Craven Sullivan (10 March 1807 – 27 February 1860) was an American politician.

Charles Craven Sullivan was born on 10 March 1807 to parents Charles Sullivan and Susannah Johnston of Butler County, Pennsylvania. His brother was Moses Sullivan. After graduating from Jefferson College in 1828, Sullivan read law in Butler with William Ayers, and subsequently practiced there. As president of the North Western Railroad Company, Sullivan advocated for the establishment of a rail line through Butler. He served in the Pennsylvania Senate for District 19 in 1841 and 1843, as a Whig. In 1845, Sullivan represented District 24. After the Whig Party dissolved, Sullivan joined the Republican Party.

Both of Sullivan's sons became lawyers. He and his wife also raised three daughters. Sullivan died on 27 February 1860.
