= John Hoge (1851 Pennsylvania legislator) =

American politician

John Hoge served in the Pennsylvania Senate in 1851. He was a Democrat who represented District 19, which at the time included the counties of Mercer, Venango, and Warren. His son Thomas Hoge succeeded him. John Hoge and his wife Mary Irwin were of Irish descent.
