= Thomas Hoge =

American politician (1808–1885)

Thomas Hoge (7 March 1808 – 12 March 1885) was an American politician.

Thomas Hoge's paternal grandparents Robert and Mary Hoge emigrated from Ireland to the United States. His maternal grandparents did as well, in 1760, making their home in Juniata County. Thomas was the youngest of five sons born to John Hoge and Mary Irwin. At the time of his birth on 7 March 1808, the Hoge family were living in Butler County, Pennsylvania. Aged seventeen, he moved to Cleveland and traveled around the western United States. Hoge returned to Pennsylvania, and learned ironworking at the furnace in Mount Aetna, then subsequently ran the slab furnace in Franklin Township, Venango County with William Cross. In 1853, Hoge moved into Franklin, and succeeded his father as a Democratic member of the Pennsylvania Senate for District 19. He also served in the 1855 session, and later returned to office in 1863 and 1865, for District 26 and District 28, respectively. He also served as mayor of Franklin.

Hoge survived each of his three wives. His first marriage, to Harriet Cross, lasted from 1835 to 1836. The year after Cross died, he married Jane Whann. Hoge and Whann raised two daughters, and she died in 1864. Hoge's third wife Eliza Henderson died in 1879. Thomas Hoge died in Franklin on 12 March 1885.
