= George Householder =

American politician and newspaper founder

George W. Householder (1 September 1825 – 5 July 1906) was an American politician and newspaper founder.

Householder was born in Bedford County, Pennsylvania, on 1 September 1825. He began working as a lawyer and served in the Pennsylvania House of Representatives in 1861. He served as the Republican legislator from the counties of Bedford and Somerset, when his election was challenged on 16 January 1862. Householder was duly removed from office. He subsequently represented District 19 of the Pennsylvania Senate in 1863, followed by District 20 in 1865. Householder later moved to Kansas City, Missouri, where he owned the Kansas City Evening Bulletin from 1868, and died on 5 July 1906.
