= William Alexander Purviance =

American politician (1788–1857)

William Alexander Purviance (22 June 1788 – 1 April 1857) was an American surveyor and politician.

Purviance was born on 22 June 1788 in Claysville, Pennsylvania to parents John Purviance and Elizabeth Thompson. He later moved to Butler County, Pennsylvania, and into Petersville, Connoquenessing, Pennsylvania, in 1810. Purviance acquired the farm and mill operation of William Campbell. Purviance was a surveyor for 49 years, and spent three of those years working for Butler County. Between 1835 and 1839, he served on the Pennsylvania Senate for District 19 while affiliated with the Anti-Masonic Party. Purviance died on 1 April 1857.
