= Carolyn Comitta =

Pennsylvania state senator (2021–present)

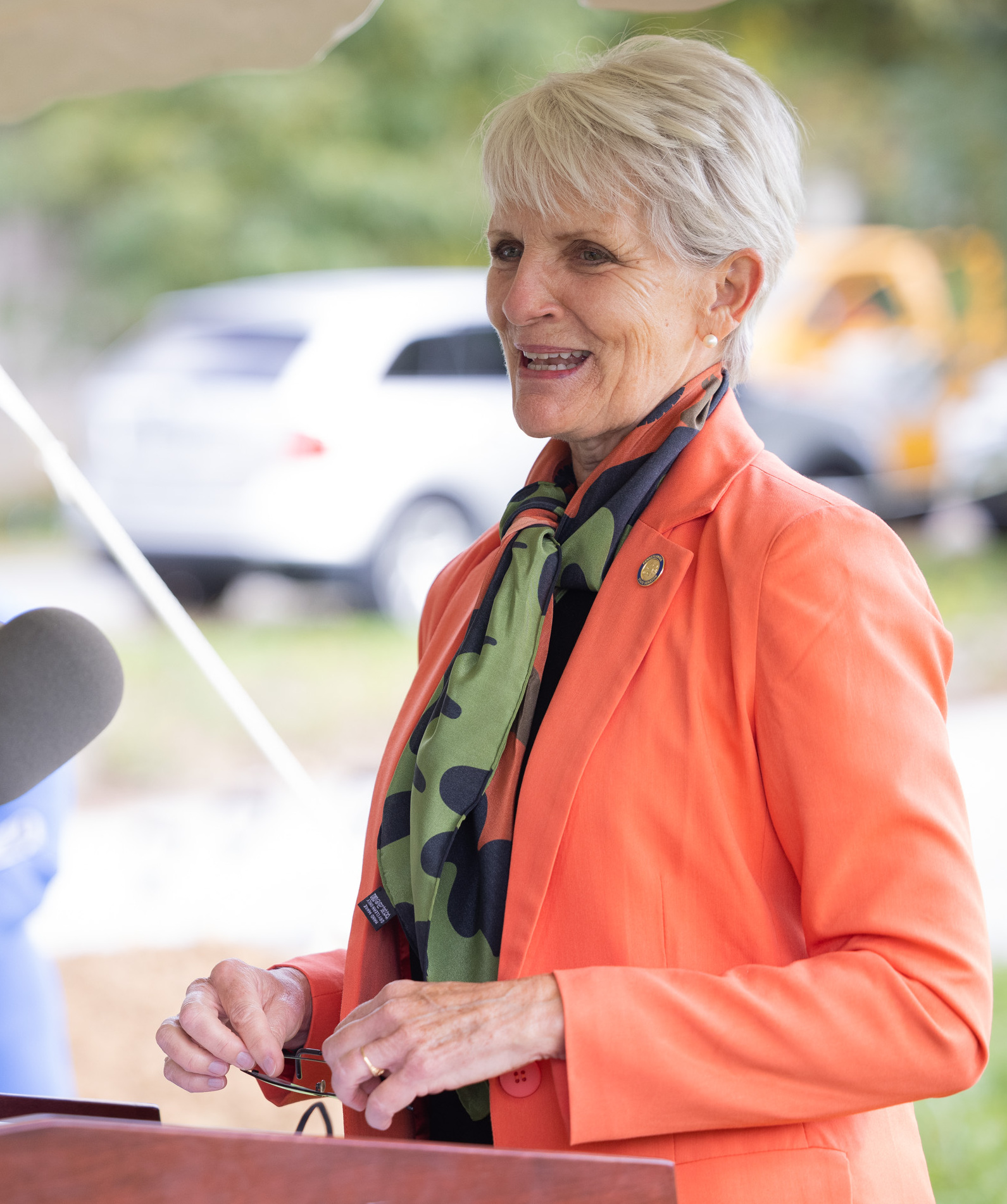

Member of the Pennsylvania Senate from the 19th district
- Incumbent
- Assumed office January 5, 2021
- Preceded by: Andy Dinniman

Member of the Pennsylvania House of Representatives from the 156th district
- In office January 3, 2017 – November 30, 2020
- Preceded by: Dan Truitt
- Succeeded by: Dianne Herrin

58th Mayor of West Chester, Pennsylvania
- In office January 4, 2010 – April 12, 2017
- Preceded by: Dick Yoder
- Succeeded by: Jordan Norley

Member of the West Chester Borough Council from the 5th Ward
- In office January 2, 2006 – January 4, 2010
- Preceded by: Barbara McIlvaine Smith
- Succeeded by: Tom Paxson

Personal details
- Born: April 27, 1952 (age 74)
- Party: Democratic
- Spouse: Tom
- Children: 2
- Education: West Chester University, Widener University
- Occupation: Politician, Educator, Financial officer

Carolyn T. Comitta is an American politician, educator and financial officer. A Democrat, she is a member of the Pennsylvania State Senate representing the 19th district. Previously, Comitta was the first woman to serve as Mayor of West Chester, the seat of Chester County, Pennsylvania, and served two terms in the Pennsylvania House of Representatives representing the 156th district.

== Early life and education ==
Comitta was born in Buffalo, New York, and her family moved to West Goshen when she was 2 years old, where she has lived ever since. Comitta received her BS in Education from West Chester University (then West Chester State College) in 1974, and her M.Ed. from Widener University in 1989.

== Professional career ==
From the mid-1970s to the mid-1980s, Comitta worked in the Octorara Area School District as a special and gifted education curriculum specialist and teacher. Since 1988, she has been a member of the Board of Directors of World Information Transfer, Inc., a non-profit, non-governmental educational organization focused on health- and environment-related issues.

She is the Vice President and Chief Financial Officer of her husband's firm, Thomas Comitta Associates, Town Planners and Landscape Architects.

== Political career ==
=== West Chester Borough Council ===
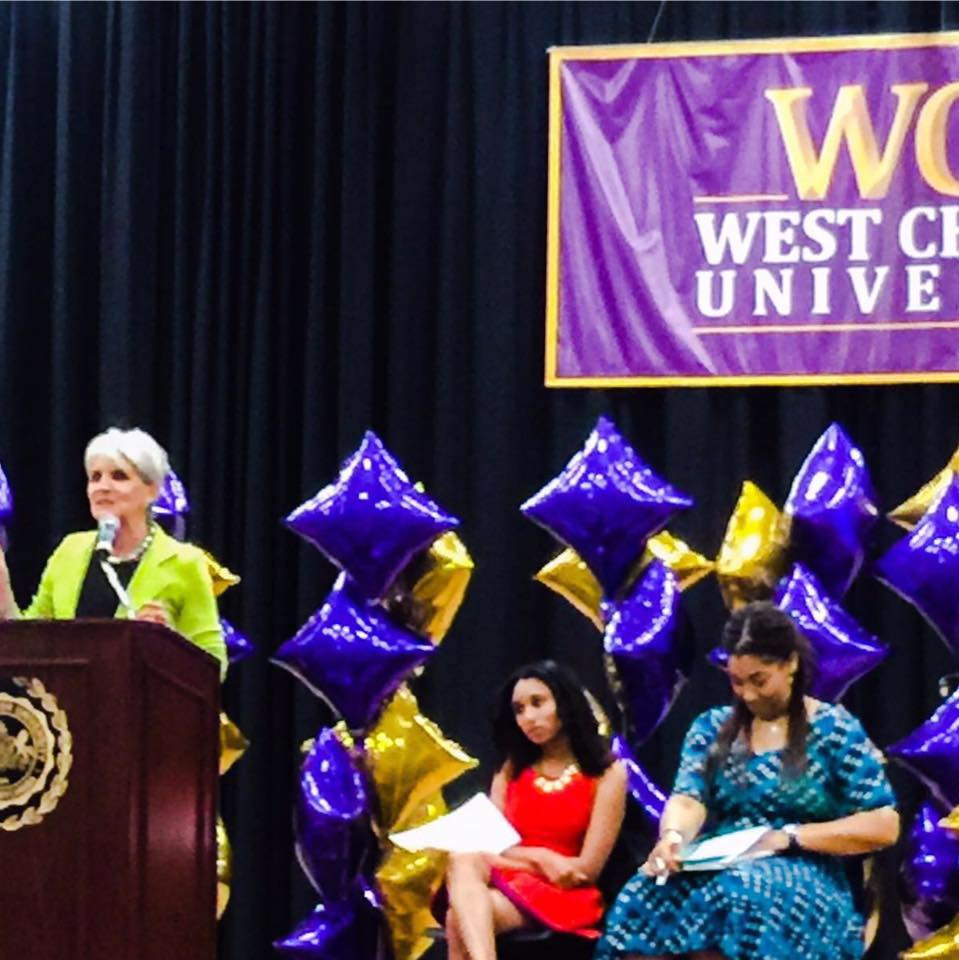
Comitta speaking at West Chester University.

Comitta was first elected to the West Chester Borough Council in 2005, taking-over the Fifth Ward seat vacated by incumbent Democratic Councilwoman Barbara McIlvaine Smith. While on Council, she served as chair of the Borough Council's Public Safety Committee, and also chaired the Planning Zoning, Business & Industrial Development Committee. She also served as a member of the Parks, Recreation and Environmental Protection Committee, as well as the Finance Committee.

=== Mayor of West Chester ===
She sought the office of Borough Mayor in 2009, and defeated Councilman Bill Scott in the Democratic primary. She was elected unopposed in the fall general election, and took office the following January. In succeeding the term-limited incumbent Mayor, Republican Dick Yoder, Comitta became West Chester's first ever female Mayor, and its first Democratic Mayor since 1992.

=== Pennsylvania House of Representatives ===
On January 7, 2016, Comitta announced her intent to run for the Pennsylvania House of Representatives in the 156th District, challenging incumbent Dan Truitt. After a lengthy recount, she was declared the winner over Truitt by 25 votes on December 16, 2016.

On November 6, 2018, Comitta won re-election against Republican challenger Nicholas Deminski by a margin of 13 points or 4,108 votes.

In 2020, Comitta sought re-election to her House seat and was unopposed in the Democratic primary. She ended her House campaign in June 2020 to focus on her Senate campaign and was replaced on the ballot by West Chester mayor Dianne Herrin.

=== Pennsylvania State Senate ===
In February 2020, State Senator Andy Dinniman announced his retirement at the end of his term. Dinniman's retirement as considered surprising as he had been preparing for a re-election campaign for a fourth term and petitioning had already begun. The day after Dinniman's announcement, Comitta announced her campaign for the Pennsylvania State Senate in the 19th District. In a three-way Democratic primary against Dinniman's longtime aide Don Vymazal and local school board member Kyle Boyer, Dinniman endorsed Vymazal, while Comitta was endorsed by Governor Tom Wolf and several labor unions. After Pennsylvania delayed their primary to June 2 due to the COVID-19 pandemic, Comitta won the primary with nearly 51% of the vote.

In the general election, Comitta defeated Republican Kevin Runey with 57.43% of the vote.

For the 2025-2026 Session Comitta serves on the following committees in the State Senate:

- Environmental Resources & Energy (Minority Chair)
- Aging & Youth
- Agriculture & Rural Affairs
- Education
- Local Government

== Electoral history ==
=== Pennsylvania's 156th Legislative District ===
==== 2016 election ====
Pennsylvania House of Representatives, District 156, 2016
Party	Candidate	Votes	%
Democratic	Carolyn Comitta	18,267	49.98%
Republican	Dan Truitt (incumbent)	18,242	49.91%
Write-in		43	0.12%
Total votes		36,552	100.00%
Democratic gain from Republican			

==== 2018 election ====
Pennsylvania House of Representatives, District 156, 2018
Party	Candidate	Votes	%
Democratic	Carolyn Comitta (incumbent)	17,923	56.48%
Republican	Nicholas J Deminski	13,792	43.46%
Write-in		17	0.05%
Total votes		31,732	100.00%
Democratic hold			

==== 2020 Democratic Primary ====
Democratic primary results
Party	Candidate	Votes	%
Democratic	Carolyn Comitta (incumbent)	Unopposed	
Total votes		9,261	100.00

=== Pennsylvania's 19th Senatorial District ===
Comitta Carolyn State Senate campaign logo

==== 2020 Democratic Primary ====
Democratic primary results
Party	Candidate	Votes	%
Democratic	Carolyn Comitta	18,914	51.33%
Democratic	Don Vymazal	11,704	31.77%
Democratic	Kyle J Boyer	6,161	16.72%
Write-in		66	0.18%
Total votes		36,845	100.00%

==== 2020 general election ====
Pennsylvania Senate, District 19, 2020
Party	Candidate	Votes	%
Democratic	Carolyn Comitta	88,199	57.43%
Republican	Kevin Runey	65,233	42.48%
Write-in		135	0.09%
Total votes		153,567	100.00%
Democratic hold			

== Personal life ==
Comitta and her husband, Tom, have two grown children. Tom Comitta is a Planner and Landscape Architect.

Political offices
Pennsylvania State Senate
Preceded by Andy Dinniman	Member of the Pennsylvania Senate from the 19th district 2021-Present	Incumbent
Pennsylvania House of Representatives
Preceded by Dan Truitt	Member of the Pennsylvania House of Representatives from the 156th district 2017-2020	Succeeded by Dianne Herrin
