= Ross E. Householder House =

United States historic place in Arizona

- U.S. National Register of Historic Places
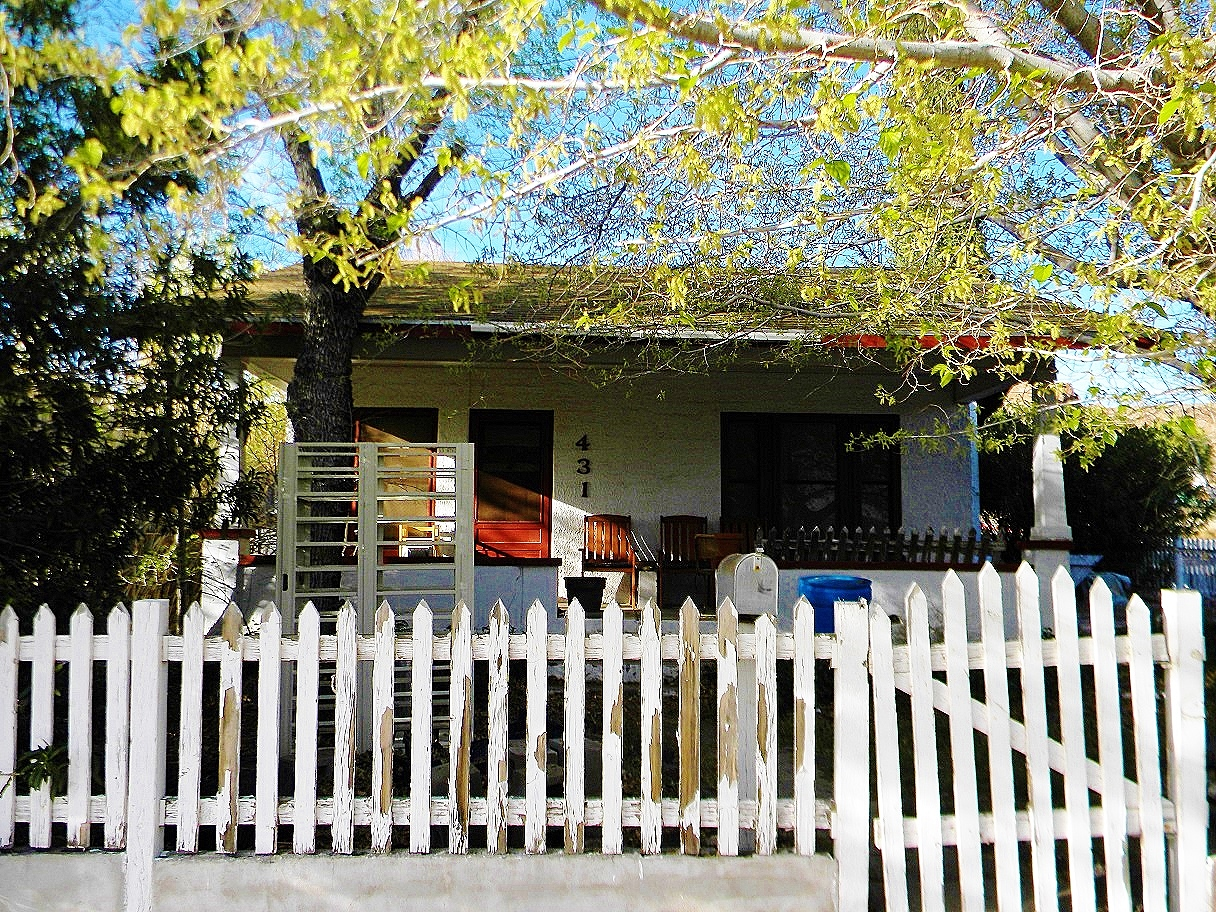

- Location within Arizona Location within the United States
- Location: 431 Spring Street; Kingman, Arizona
- Coordinates: 35°11′30″N 114°3′1″W
- Built: 1920
- Architect: E.R. Householder
- Architectural style: Bungalow/Craftsman
- MPS: Kingman MRA
- NRHP reference No.: 86001149
- Added to NRHP: May 14, 1986

Ross E. Householder House is at 431 Spring Street, Kingman, Arizona. The house was built in 1916–23. The house is Bungalow/Craftsman style. It was evaluated for National Register listing as part of a 1985 study of 63 historic resources in Kingman that led to this and many others being listed.

The house was built by R. E. Householder. Mr. Householder was a mining engineer who owned his own business of civil and mining engineering from 1919 to 1940. During the 1930s, he was the Mohave County Engineer. He did serve in the Arizona Legislature.
