= Pennsylvania's 19th Senate district =

American legislative district

Pennsylvania's 19th State Senate district
Senator
Carolyn Comitta; D–West Chester
- Population (2021): 253,763

Pennsylvania State Senate District 19 includes part of Chester County. It is currently represented by Democrat Carolyn Comitta.

== District profile ==
The district includes the following areas:

- Coatesville
- Downingtown
- East Bradford Township
- East Caln Township
- East Fallowfield Township
- East Goshen Township
- East Nottingham Township
- Easttown Township
- Elk Township
- Highland Township
- Londonderry Township
- Lower Oxford Township
- Malvern
- Modena
- New London Township
- Newlin Township
- Oxford
- Penn Township
- South Coatesville
- Tredyffrin Township
- Upper Oxford Township
- Valley Township
- West Bradford Township
- West Chester
- West Fallowfield Township
- West Goshen Township
- West Marlborough Township
- West Nottingham Township
- West Whiteland Township
- Willistown Township

== Senators ==
Representative	Party	Years	District home	Note
Samuel Power	Republican	1815 – 1822		Pennsylvania State Senator for the 21st district from 1823 to 1828
John St. Clair	Democratic-Republican	1823 – 1826		
Daniel Sturgeon	Jackson Democrat	1827 – 1830		Pennsylvania State Representative from 1818 to 1824. Treasurer of Pennsylvania from 1836 to 1840. U.S. Senator from Pennsylvania from 1840 to 1851.
Solomon G. Krepps	Democratic	1831 – 1832		
John A. Sangston	Democratic	1833 – 1838		
Cornelius Darragh	Whig	1837 – 1838		Pennsylvania State Senator for the 21st district from 1835 to 1836. 25th Attorney General of Pennsylvania from 1849 to 1851. U.S. Representative for Pennsylvania's 21st congressional district from 1844 to 1847.
William Alexander Purviance	Anti-Masonic	1835 – 1839		
Thomas S. Williams	Whig	1839 – 1841		
Charles Craven Sullivan	Whig	1841 – 1844		Pennsylvania State Senator for the 24th district from 1845 to 1846
George Darsie	Whig	1841 – 1842		Pennsylvania State Senator for the 24th district from 1843 to 1854
George Shannon Mullin Sr.	Whig	1843 – 1844		Pennsylvania State Senator for the 15th district from 1841 to 1842
John Morrison	Whig	1845		
Alexander King	Whig	1847 – 1850		
John Hoge	Democratic	1851		
Thomas Hoge	Democratic	1853 – 1856		Pennsylvania State Senator for the 26th district from 1863 to 1864 and the 28th district from 1865 to 1866.
William Peter Schell	Democratic	1857 – 1859		
Glenni William Scofield	Republican	1857 – 1858		Pennsylvania State Representative from 1849 to 1851. Pennsylvania State Senator for the 11th district from 1859 to 1860. U.S. Representative for Pennsylvania's 19th congressional district from 1863 to 1873. U.S. Representative for Pennsylvania's at-large congressional district from 1873 to 1875
Samuel S. Wharton	Republican	1861		
George W. Householder	Republican	1863 – 1864		Pennsylvania State Senator for the 20th district from 1865 to 1866
Alexander Stutzman	Republican	1863 – 1866		Pennsylvania State Senator for the 20th district from 1867 to 1868
William McSherry	Democratic	1865 – 1866		Pennsylvania State Senator for the 18th district from 1863 to 1864 and the 20th district from 1873 to 1874.
Calvin Mark Duncan	Democratic	1865 – 1871		
James Marion Weakley	Republican	1871 – 1873		
Robert L. McClellan	Republican	1875		
James Bowen Everhart	Republican	1877 – 1892		U.S. Representative for Pennsylvania's 6th congressional district from 1883 to 1887
Abram D. Harlan	Republican	1893 – 1904		
Septimus Evans Nivin	Democratic	1891 – 1892		
William Preston Snyder	Republican	1893 – 1904		
Oscar E. Thomson	Republican	1905 – 1912		
John Gyger	Republican	1913 – 1916		
Thomas Lawrence Eyre	Republican	1919 – 1926		
William Hannum Clark	Republican	1927 – 1936		
George B. Scarlett	Republican	1937 – 1952		
Thomas P. Harney	Republican	1953 – 1960		
John H. Ware III	Republican	1961 – 1970		U.S. Representative for Pennsylvania's 9th congressional district from 1970 to 1973 and Pennsylvania's 5th congressional district from 1973 to 1975.
John Stauffer	Republican	1970 – 1988		Pennsylvania State Representative for the Chester County district from 1965 to 1968 and the 157th district from 1969 to 1970. Republican Whip of the Pennsylvania Senate from 1977 to 1982. Republican Leader of the Pennsylvania Senate from 1985 to 1988.
Earl M. Baker	Republican	1989 – 1995		Resigned August 31, 1995
Robert J. Thompson	Republican	1995 – 2006		Seated December 4, 1995. Died Jan 28, 2006
Andrew E. Dinniman	Democratic	2006 – 2020	West Whiteland Township	Elected May 16, 2006 to fill vacancy.
Carolyn Comitta	Democratic	2021 – present	West Chester	
