= Alexander Stutzman =

American politician

Alexander Stutzman (c. 1820 – 1900) was an American politician.

Alexander Stutzman was born to parents Jost Justus Stutzman and Elisabetha Gerber in about 1820. Outside of politics, Stutzman worked as a teacher and lawyer. From 1847, he ran a store, and helped established a foundry in 1868. Stutzman was a Republican member of the Pennsylvania Senate in 1863 and 1865 for District 19, and served District 20 in 1867. He was married to Frances Hicks, and died on 3 January 1900.
