= Michael Manzo =

American activist

- Born: Monaca, Pennsylvania
- Other name: Mike
- Education: Penn State
- Political party: Democratic Party
- Spouse: Shannon Manzo (????–????)

Michael L. "Mike" Manzo is a former chief of staff for Pennsylvania House of Representatives Majority Leader H. William DeWeese. He served as a staffer for the Democratic Caucus in the Pennsylvania House of Representatives for over 10 years, rising to become one of the most powerful staffers in the state capitol. Manzo controlled the policy and communications efforts for the House Democratic Caucus and helped engineer the passage of a wide range of bills.

In 2007, he was fired by DeWeese and subsequently charged for allegedly using taxpayer money for illegal campaign purposes and creating a no-work job for his mistress. In his testimony for the prosecution at a preliminary hearing, he implicated his former boss, DeWeese, in the alleged scheme.

== Personal life ==
Manzo was born in Monaca, Beaver County, Pennsylvania. His father was a steelworker and his mother worked at a local jewelry store. He played drums and baseball at Monaca School District, where he graduated fourth in his class. He graduated from Penn State University in 1991 with a degree in Marketing, and began working as a salesman for AT&T and as an agent for U.S. Airways.

== Political career ==
=== Pennsylvania House of Representatives ===
With a recommendation from fellow Beaver County-native Mike Veon, Manzo began working in 1994 as a Harrisburg staff aide for long-time State Representative Camille "Bud" George. He worked at an "almost frantic pace" and rose through the ranks of the House Democratic Caucus of the Pennsylvania House of Representatives. In 1999, he became press secretary and communications director for the House Democratic Caucus and spokesman for the Democratic leader, H. William DeWeese. In this position, he successfully re-designed and modernized the caucus' media strategy.

In 2001, Manzo became DeWeese's chief of staff and oversaw policy and communications for the entire Democratic caucus. In this position, he was a key negotiator for four state budgets, the historic slot machine gaming act, a minimum wage increase, the Growing Greener (I and II) initiatives, and the Alternative Energy Portfolio Standards Act. He was also involved in two expansions of the PACE program providing drug coverage for Pennsylvania seniors, the expansion of the Pennsylvania CHIP program known as "Cover All Kids" and the 2004 Economic Stimulus program that led to the creation of the Commonwealth Financing Authority. Manzo created an improved electronic and print communications between legislators and constituents by creating a caucus office for "e-communication," expanding the in-house print shop for legislative newsletters and reports, and developing podcasting and streaming audio and video. He was listed on the "Pennsylvania Report 100" most influential people in Pennsylvania for three straight years. His influence was noted by PoliticsPA.com, who name Manzo one of the "smartest staffers" in the Pennsylvania Capitol, describing him as having earned an "honorary Masters from the State Rep. Bud George school of politics." Pundits commented that his job description included providing frequent "DeWeese-to-English translations" for his boss' famously verbose speaking style. In 2002, he was named to the PoliticsPA list of "Rising Stars" in Pennsylvania politics.

=== Firing ===
Manzo and six other Democratic staffers were fired on November 13, 2007, after the release of emails pertaining to the Pennsylvania Attorney General's investigation into illegal legislative bonuses paid for campaign work. Manzo denied any wrongdoing and said that he resigned to avoid becoming a distraction for the Democratic caucus.

=== Triad Strategies ===
By the end of November 2007, Manzo was hired as a senior relations consultant for Triad Strategies, a Harrisburg, Pennsylvania-based lobbying and public relations firm. Anthony May, a senior vice president at Triad, expressed no concern about hiring Manzo in the midst of the legislative bonus controversy, saying, "We always had hoped Mike would come to work for us."

== Legal issues ==
=== Grand jury investigation ===
On July 10, 2008, Pennsylvania Attorney General Tom Corbett announced that his office was filing charges against Manzo and 11 other current and former Democratic staff members relating to the legislative bonus controversy. Manzo faces nine counts each of conflict of interest, theft by unlawful taking or disposition, theft by deception, theft of services, theft by failure to make required disposition of funds, and two counts of criminal conspiracy. The charges carry a maximum penalty of 311 years in prison and $660,000 in fines.

The grand jury convened to investigate the matter found that Manzo had "directly coordinated" the illegal use of taxpayer funds and resources for political campaigns. Specifically, the grand jury found that in 2004, Manzo and Mike Veon began tracking all House Democratic Caucus employees who volunteered for off-duty political campaign work. This list recorded the various efforts and campaign activities of the "volunteers" and was eventually refined to identify those public employees who excelled at these campaign efforts, denoting them as "superstars," "Rock Stars," "Good," and "OK." The House Democratic Caucus paid $188,800 in taxpayer funds as secret bonuses to these staffers a reward for their campaign efforts for the 2004 election. The secret bonuses paid in 2006 election totaled $1,285,250.

The grand jury also found that Manzo and fellow staffer Brett Cott used the employees and resources of the House Democratic Caucus to mount petition challenges against opponents of the House Democratic Caucus and the Democratic Party. Employees of the caucus spent time during their regular work hours working to disqualify candidates, including Presidential candidate Ralph Nader in 2004 and the Green Party's candidate for the US Senate in 2006, Carl Romanelli. Additionally, the grand jury found that Manzo had used his authority to create a "no-work" job for a former legislative intern with whom he allegedly had a "long-running sexual liaison" from 2004 through November 2007. The office was located above Bloom Cigar Company, an iconic cigar store in Pittsburgh's South Side neighborhood owned by a friend of Mike Veon.

=== Testimony in preliminary hearing ===
Manzo waived his right to a preliminary hearing on the sufficiency of the evidence against him. In a surprise turn, he took the stand as a witness for the prosecution during preliminary hearings for two of his co-defendants, State Representative Sean Ramaley and Anna Marie Perretta-Rosepink, and implicated DeWeese in the bonus scheme. According to his testimony under cross-examination, Manzo believed that DeWeese was aware that the secret bonuses were compensation for illegal campaign work. DeWeese, who has not been charged with any crime, denies any wrongdoing and called Manzo a "desperate, disgruntled former employee whom I fired last year for dishonesty and self-dealing." Manzo's attorney, Jim Eisenhower, who ran for Pennsylvania Attorney General in 2000 and was the Democratic nominee for Attorney General in 2004, said that Manzo will plead guilty to the "most serious charges against him" and will make his cooperation known to the sentencing judge. The trial of the 12 defendants is expected to begin in January 2009.

== See also ==
- H. William DeWeese
- Bonusgate
