= 2016 Pennsylvania Attorney General election =

- November 8, 2016
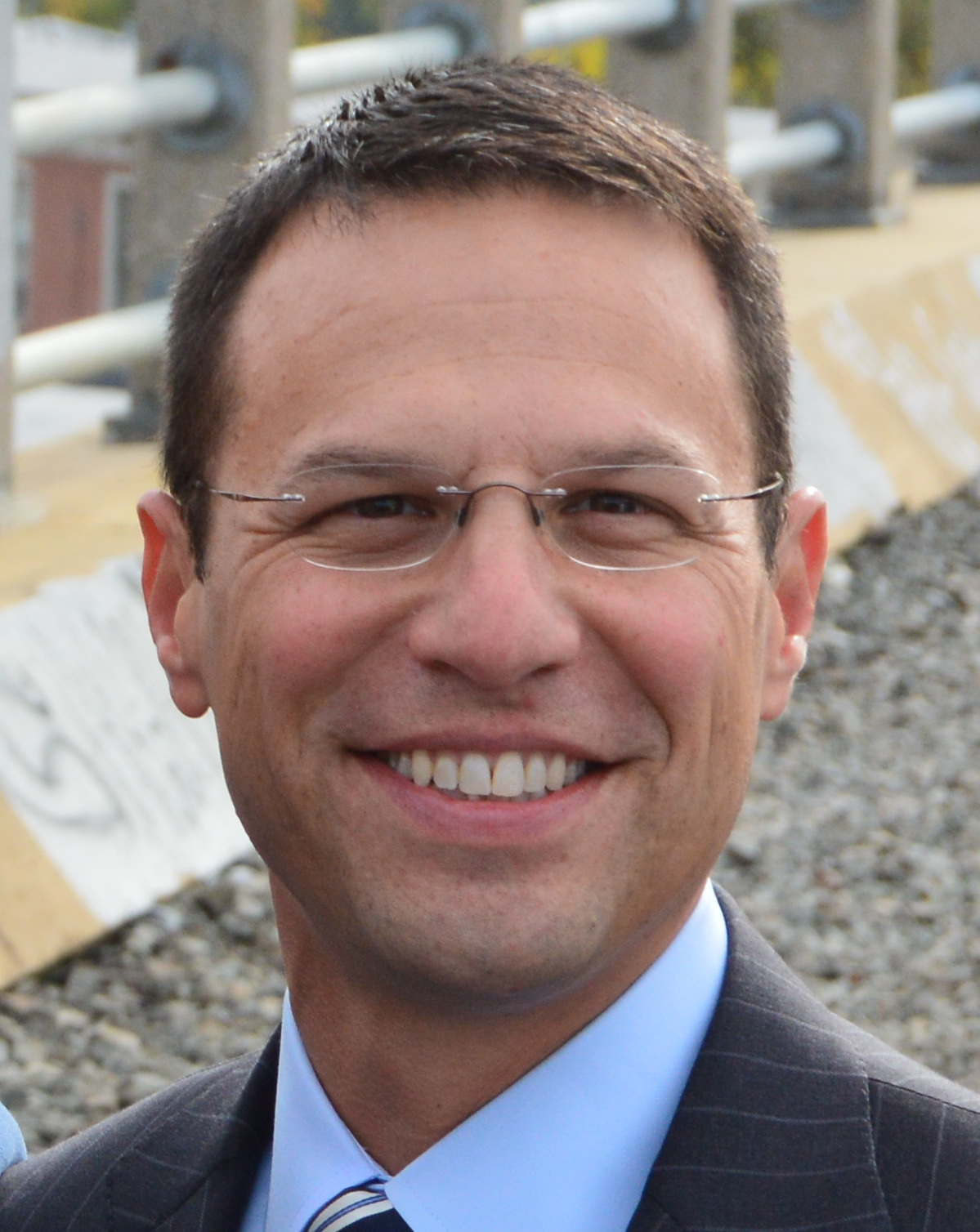

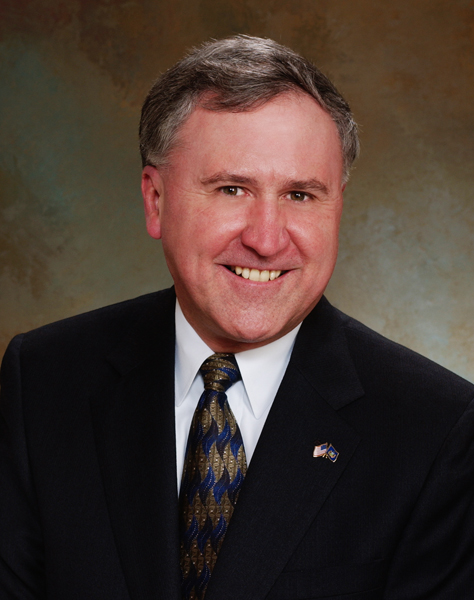
Nominee	Josh Shapiro	John Rafferty Jr.
Party	Democratic	Republican
Popular vote	3,057,010	2,891,325
Percentage	51.39%	48.61%
- Shapiro: 50–60% 60–70% 70–80% 80–90% >90% Rafferty: 50–60% 60–70% 70–80% 80–90% >90% Tie: 50% No votes
Attorney General before election
Bruce Beemer
Democratic
Elected Attorney General
Josh Shapiro
Democratic

The Pennsylvania attorney general election of 2016 took place on November 8, 2016, to elect a new Pennsylvania attorney general. Democratic incumbent Kathleen Kane originally indicated her intention to seek re-election, but dropped out after she was criminally charged with violating grand jury secrecy laws stemming from alleged leaks of grand jury investigation details to embarrass a political enemy.

Democratic nominee and Montgomery County commissioner Josh Shapiro defeated Republican state senator John Rafferty Jr. by a margin of 2.78%.

== Democratic primary ==
=== Candidates ===
==== Declared ====
- John Morganelli, Northampton County district attorney, candidate for Attorney General in 2000 and 2004 and nominee in 2008
- Josh Shapiro, chairman of the Montgomery County Board of Supervisors and former state representative (2005–2012)
- Stephen Zappala, Allegheny County district attorney

==== Withdrawn ====
- David Fawcett, former Allegheny County councilman
- Kathleen Kane, incumbent attorney general
- Jack Stollsteimer, former Delaware County assistant district attorney and former assistant United States attorney

=== Endorsements ===
John Morganelli

Individuals

- Jean Engler, Carbon County district attorney
- Anthony Rosini, former Northumberland County district attorney
- Cal Shields, former Schuylkill County district attorney
Josh Shapiro

Presidents

- Barack Obama, 44th president of the United States

U.S. senators

- Bob Casey, Jr., United States senator from Pennsylvania

Former assistant U.S. attorneys

- Jack Stollsteimer, former Delaware County assistant district attorney, former assistant United States attorney and former 2016 attorney general candidate

Governors

- Ed Rendell, 45th governor of Pennsylvania
- Tom Wolf, 47th and current governor of Pennsylvania

State executive officials

- Eugene DePasquale, Auditor General of Pennsylvania

State legislators

- Leslie Acosta, state representative
- Donna Bullock, state representative
- Tina Davis, state representative
- Art Haywood, state senator
- Vincent Hughes, state senator and former state representative
- Stephen Kinsey, state representative
- Leanne Krueger-Braneky, state representative
- Daylin Leach, state senator and former state representative
- Joanna E. McClinton, state representative

Mayors and other municipal leaders

- Kim Bracey, Mayor of York
- Blondell Reynolds Brown, Philadelphia City Councilwoman
- Darrell L. Clarke, Philadelphia City Council president
- Rick Gray, Mayor of Lancaster
- Derek Green, Philadelphia City Councilman
- Bill Greenlee, Philadelphia City Councilman
- Helen Gym, Philadelphia City Councilwoman
- Kenyatta Johnson, Philadelphia City Councilman and former state representative
- Eric Papenfuse, Mayor of Harrisburg
- Cherelle Parker, Philadelphia City Councilman and former state representative
- Maria Quiñones-Sanchez, Philadelphia City Councilwoman
- Marian Tasco, Philadelphia City Councilwoman
- Jewell Williams, Philadelphia Sheriff

Labor unions

- AFSCME 13
- Laborers District Council
- PASNAP
- Plumbers Local 690
- PSEA
- UFCW Local 1776

Organizations

- Chester County Democratic Committee
- Delaware County Democratic Committee
- Democracy for America
- Equality Pennsylvania
- Fraternal Order of Police Lodge 5
- League of Conservation Voters
- Liberty City Democratic Club
- Liberty City LGBT Democratic Club
- Montgomery County Democratic Committee
- Planned Parenthood PA PAC

Newspapers

- The Philadelphia Inquirer
- Philadelphia Tribune
Stephen Zappala

Individuals

- Mike Stack, Lieutenant Governor of Pennsylvania

Organizations

- Western Pennsylvania Chiefs of Police Association

=== Polling ===
Poll source	Date(s) administered	Sample size (Note: Key: A – all adults RV – registered voters LV – likely voters V – unclear)	Margin of error	Kathleen Kane	John Morganelli	Josh Shapiro	Stephen Zappala	Other	Undecided
Harper Polling	January 22–23, 2016	640 (LV)	± 3.81%	31%	9%	13%	18%	–	30%
Harper Polling	January 22–23, 2016	640 (LV)	± 3.81%	–	12%	19%	20%	–	49%

=== Results ===
2016 Pennsylvania Attorney General Democratic primary results Shapiro—80-90% Shapiro—60-70% Shapiro—50-60% Shapiro—40-50% Shapiro—30-40% Zappala—40-50% Zappala—50-60% Zappala—60-70% Zappala—70-80% Morganelli—30-40% Morganelli—40-50% Morganelli—60-70% Morganelli—70-80%

Democratic primary results
Party	Candidate	Votes	%
Democratic	Josh Shapiro	725,168	47.03%
Democratic	Stephen Zappala	566,501	36.74%
Democratic	John Morganelli	250,097	16.22%
Total votes		1,541,766	100.0%

== Republican primary ==
=== Candidates ===
==== Declared ====
- Joe Peters, former federal and state prosecutor and nominee for Pennsylvania Auditor General in 2004
- John Rafferty, state senator

==== Withdrawn ====
- Todd Stephens, state representative

==== Declined ====
- Heather Heidelbaugh, former Allegheny County councilwoman

=== Results ===
2016 Pennsylvania Attorney General Republican primary results Rafferty—80-90% Rafferty—70-80% Rafferty—60-70% Rafferty—50-60% Peters—50-60% Peters—70-80% Peters—80-90%

Republican primary results
Party	Candidate	Votes	%
Republican	John Rafferty	819,510	63.82%
Republican	Joe Peters	464,491	36.18%
Total votes		1,284,001	100.0%

== General election ==
=== Predictions ===
Source	Ranking
Governing	Tossup

=== Results ===
2016 Pennsylvania Attorney General election
Party	Candidate	Votes	%	±%
Democratic	Josh Shapiro	3,057,010	51.39%	−4.75%
Republican	John Rafferty	2,891,325	48.61%	+7.05%
Total votes		5,948,335	100.0%	N/A
Democratic hold				
