= 2004 Pennsylvania elections =

- November 2, 2004
- Registered: 8,366,663
- Turnout: 69.0%

Elections were held in Pennsylvania on November 2, 2004. Primary elections for state and federal government offices were held on April 27, 2004.

== President ==
United States presidential primary election in Pennsylvania, 2004
Party	Candidate	Votes	%
Democratic	John F. Kerry	585,683	74.1
Democratic	Howard Dean	79,799	10.1
Democratic	John Edwards	76,762	9.7
Democratic	Dennis J. Kucinich	30,110	3.8
Democratic	Lyndon H. LaRouche, Jr.	17,528	2.2
Total votes		789,882	100.0

United States Republican presidential primary election in Pennsylvania, 2004
Party	Candidate	Votes	%
Republican	George W. Bush	Unopposed	
Total votes		861,555	100.00

United States presidential election in Pennsylvania, 2004
Party	Candidate	Votes	%
Democratic	John F. Kerry Running mate:John Edwards	2,938,095	51.0
Republican	George W. Bush Running mate:Dick Cheney	2,793,847	48.5
Libertarian	Michael Badnarik Running mate:Richard Campagna	21,185	0.4
Green	David K. Cobb Running mate:Pat LaMarche	6,319	0.1
Constitution	Michael Anthony Peroutka Running mate:Chuck Baldwin	6,318	0.1
Total votes		5,765,764	100.0

== Senator ==
United States Senate Democratic primary election in Pennsylvania, 2004
Party	Candidate	Votes	%
Democratic	Joseph M. Hoeffel	Unopposed	
Total votes		595,816	100.0

United States Senate Republican primary election in Pennsylvania, 2004
Party	Candidate	Votes	%
Republican	Arlen Specter	530,839	50.8
Republican	Pat Toomey	513,693	49.2
Total votes		1,044,532	100.0

United States Senate election in Pennsylvania, 2004
Party	Candidate	Votes	%
Republican	Arlen Specter	2,925,080	52.6
Democratic	Joseph M. Hoeffel	2,334,126	42.0
Constitution	James N. Clymer	220,056	4.0
Libertarian	Betsy Summers	79,263	1.4
Total votes		5,558,525	100.0
Republican hold			

== Attorney General ==
Pennsylvania Attorney General Democratic primary election, 2004
Party	Candidate	Votes	%
Democratic	Jim Eisenhower	282,515	38.3
Democratic	John M. Morganelli	246,765	33.5
Democratic	David Barasch	207,560	28.2
Total votes		736,840	100.0

Pennsylvania Attorney General Republican primary election, 2004
Party	Candidate	Votes	%
Republican	Tom Corbett	491,651	52.8
Republican	Bruce Castor	439,711	47.2
Total votes		931,362	100.0

Pennsylvania Attorney General election, 2004
Party	Candidate	Votes	%
Republican	Tom Corbett	2,730,718	50.4
Democratic	Jim Eisenhower	2,621,927	48.3
Green	Marakay J. Rogers	70,624	1.3
Total votes		5,423,269	100.0
Republican hold			

== Auditor General ==
Pennsylvania Auditor General election, 2004
Party	Candidate	Votes	%
Democratic	Jack Wagner	2,786,909	52.1
Republican	Joe Peters	2,430,648	45.4
Green	Ben G. Price	53,716	1.0
Libertarian	Berlie R. Etzel	52,869	1.0
Constitution	Leonard E. Ritchie	28,776	0.5
Total votes		5,352,738	100.0

== State Treasurer ==
Pennsylvania state treasurer election, 2004
Party	Candidate	Votes	%
Democratic	Bob Casey, Jr.	3,353,489	61.3
Constitution	Max Lampenfield	20,406	0.4
Republican	Jean Craige Pepper	1,997,951	36.5
Libertarian	Darryl W. Perry	61,238	1.1
Green	Paul Teese	40,740	0.7

== Ballot Question ==
Water and Wastewater Infrastructure Referendum
Candidate	Votes	%
Yes	725,970	63.0
No	426,043	37.0

Referendum results by county Yes: 70–80%; 60–70%; 50–60%; No: 50–60%
