= 2000 Pennsylvania elections =

- November 6, 2000
- Registered: 7,781,997
- Turnout: 63.0%

Elections were held in Pennsylvania on November 7, 2000. Necessary primary elections were held on April 4, 2000.

== President ==
United States presidential election in Pennsylvania, 2000
Party	Candidate	Votes	%
Democratic	Al Gore Running mate:Joe Lieberman	2,485,967	50.6
Republican	George W. Bush Running mate:Dick Cheney	2,281,127	46.4
Green	Ralph Nader Running mate:Winona LaDuke	103,392	2.1
Reform	Patrick Buchanan Running mate:Ezola Foster	16,023	0.3
Constitution	Howard Phillips Running mate:J. Curtis Frazier	14,428	0.3
Libertarian	Harry Browne Running mate:Art Oliver	11,248	0.2

United States presidential primary election in Pennsylvania, 2000
Party	Candidate	Votes	%
Republican	George W. Bush	472,398	73.5
Republican	John McCain	145,719	22.7
Republican	Steve Forbes	16,162	2.5
Republican	Gary Bauer	8,806	1.4
Democratic	Al Gore	525,306	74.6
Democratic	Bill Bradley	146,797	20.8
Democratic	Lyndon H. LaRouche Jr.	32,047	4.6

== Senator ==
United States Senate primary election in Pennsylvania, 2000
Party	Candidate	Votes	%
Democratic	Ron Klink	299,219	40.7
Democratic	Allyson Y. Schwartz	194,783	26.5
Democratic	Tom Foley	184,003	25.0
Democratic	Bob Rovner	28,031	3.8
Democratic	Murray Levin	18,903	2.6
Democratic	Phil Berg	9,636	1.3

United States Senate election in Pennsylvania, 2000
Party	Candidate	Votes	%
Republican	Rick Santorum	2,481,962	52.4
Democratic	Ron Klink	2,154,908	45.5
Libertarian	John J. Featherman	45,775	1.0
Constitution	Lester B. Searer	28,382	0.6
Reform	Robert E. Domske	24,089	0.5

== Attorney general ==
Pennsylvania Attorney General primary election, 2000
Party	Candidate	Votes	%
Democratic	Jim Eisenhower	304,097	50.8
Democratic	John M. Morganelli	294,030	49.2

Pennsylvania Attorney General election, 2000
Party	Candidate	Votes	%
Republican	Mike Fisher	2,495,253	54.0
Democratic	Jim Eisenhower	1,991,144	43.1
Green	Thomas Alan Linzey	61,216	1.3
Libertarian	Julian P. Heicklen	41,519	0.9
Constitution	James N. Clymer	30,306	0.7

== Auditor General ==
Pennsylvania Auditor General election, 2000
Party	Candidate	Votes	%
Democratic	Bob Casey Jr.	2,651,551	56.8
Republican	Katie True	1,862,934	39.9
Green	Anne E. R. Goeke	62,642	1.3
Libertarian	Jessica A. Morris	41,967	0.9
Constitution	John H. Rhine	23,971	0.5
Reform	James R. Blair	21,476	0.5

== State Treasurer ==
Pennsylvania State Treasurer election, 2000
Party	Candidate	Votes	%
Republican	Barbara Hafer	2,307,422	49.3
Democratic	Catherine Baker Knoll	2,211,471	47.2
Green	Barbara S. Knox	68,805	1.5
Constitution	John P. McDermott	41,093	0.9
Libertarian	John D. Famularo	30,867	0.7
Reform	Joseph F. Patterson	21,276	0.5
