= 2006 Pennsylvania General Assembly bonus controversy =

In 2007, Pennsylvania Attorney General Republican Tom Corbett began investigating $3.8 million in public bonuses which were paid to state legislative staffers in the Pennsylvania General Assembly to work on party politics and campaigns. While the bonuses themselves are not illegal, state law forbids state employees from performing campaign work while on the job and forbids payment for campaign work out of taxpayer funds.

Pennsylvania media referred to this scandal as "bonusgate." Originally the investigation centered on Democratic and Republican Caucuses (top state committees of each party) in each of the state's two chambers, the Senate and the House of Representatives. Democrats dominated the investigate in the highly (at that time) Democratic state.

As the investigation continued other areas of concern arose, including findings of judicial corruption, nepotism, conflict of interest and Republican corruption in a subsidiary investigation dubbed "Computergate" by the press, in which Republicans used state monies to pay state employees to develop computer programs to find and target Republican voters.

Still later investigations discovered the Kids for cash scandal in 2008 which judges in Luzerne County Court of Common Pleas in Wilkes-Barre, were paid kickbacks to ensure juveniles were sent to for-profit facilities.

There was also a skimming operation in which two not-for-profit organizations in Beaver County, PA called Beaver Investment for Growth (BIG), had funds skimmed to fund political campaigns.

This was followed by disciplinary action against politicians who sent or received raunchy, racist and misogynistic emails called "Porngate".

In 2014 still more bribery was discovered in the Pennsylvania Attorney General Sting.

== Attorney General's investigation ==
Bonuses to staffers were awarded by the four legislative caucuses in the Pennsylvania General Assembly with House Democrats handing out $2.3 million, House Republicans - $919,000, Senate Democrats - $41,000 and Senate Republicans $366,000.

The investigation's early focus on the House Democratic caucus and Attorney General Corbett's 2010 gubernatorial aspirations have led to charges from that the investigation may be politically motivated.

== House Democratic Caucus ==
Eighty of the 100 Democratic House staffers who were awarded bonuses in 2006 either donated money to or worked on the campaigns of Leader Bill DeWeese or his Whip, former Rep. Mike Veon.

DeWeese initially attempted to block Pennsylvania Attorney General Tom Corbett's investigation into whether the House Democratic caucus made illegal payments to staffers with motions to quash subpoenas and exclude evidence seized. However, months later he abruptly fired several staffers after turning over to Corbett self-selected documents and e-mails, and dropped his legal challenges.

The documents DeWeese turned over to the Attorney General revealed that DeWeese acknowledged awarding bonuses for campaign work and used a state-paid consultant to perform political tasks. DeWeese has not been charged in connection with bonuses or the state-paid consultant.

Grand jury testimony in the case revealed that DeWeese made bizarre personal demands of his staff, such as a small coffee in a big cup, a small salad in a big bowl, or "12 M&Ms." His state-paid aides balanced his checkbook, bought condoms and arranged his dinner dates.

At least fourteen staffers from the House Democratic caucus have been subpoenaed to testify before a grand jury in Harrisburg. Agents for the state Attorney General's office have also seized 20 boxes of records from the House Democratic caucus's Legislative Research Office in August. The director of that office, Jennifer Brubaker, is married to Scott Brubaker, former director of Staffing and Administration, who was among those fired in November 2007.

== House Republican Caucus ==
On October 22, 2007 House Republicans received subpoenas seeking personnel records. House Republican Leader Sam Smith said some House Republican staffers worked for campaigns, but also said they were not paid with taxpayers' money.

== Senate Republican Caucus ==
On January 31, 2007, the Senate Republican became the first caucus to release a list of their staffers who received bonuses. The next day, Senate Republicans ended the practice of giving bonuses altogether.

Out of sixteen Senate Republican staffers receiving bonuses, only three had worked on campaigns. Mike Long, a former aide to Senate Pro Tempore Robert Jubelirer, received a $22,500 bonus in 2006 despite taking several weeks off to work on his boss's unsuccessful re-election bid. Senate legal counsel Drew Crompton received a bonus of $19,647 despite working for Republican gubernatorial candidate Lynn Swann from July through October. Erik Arneson, chief of staff to Senator Chip Brightbill was paid $15,000 in bonus payments. None were found guilty.

On February 13, 2008, Attorney General's office officially extended its investigation to the Senate Republican caucus. The Senate Republicans have retained two Philadelphia law firms as legal advisers.

=== Computergate ===
Computergate was discovered as the Bonusgate investigation continued and found that the Republican Caucus was guilty of using public money to develop computer programs that would identify and specifically target Republican voters. (2007)

Brett O. Feese (R) State Representative was found guilty of corruption and sentenced to 4-12 months in prison and fined.

Jill Seaman (R) Staff to Freese was found guilty of corruption, sentenced to 9–23 months in prison, nine months of probation and fined.

John M. Perzel (R) State Representative, as part of Computergate, pleaded guilty to conflict of interest, theft, and conspiracy, in a scheme to spend millions of taxpayer dollars on computer technology from Aristotle, Inc. for the benefit of Republican political campaigns. (2011)

Brian Preski (R) Chief of Staff to Perzel was convicted of corruption, and sentenced to 2 1/2 years.

Paul Towhey Jr. (R) also CoS to John Perzel, pled guilty to conflict of interest and conspiracy and was given 5 years probation and fined.

Samuel Stokes (R) GOP Staff and brother-in-law to Perzel (R) pled guilty to conflict of interest and conspiracy and was sentenced to 5 yrs probation and fined.

Don McClintock (R) staff to John Perzel was found guilty of conflict of interest and conspiracy and also sentenced to five yrs probation and fined.

== LaGrotta guilty plea ==
Former State Representative Frank LaGrotta, who was working for the House Democratic caucus after losing his 2006 re-election bid, pleaded guilty to conflict of interest charges relating to hiring his relatives for no-work jobs. The scheme was uncovered during inspection of personnel documents during the bonus investigation.

== Veon guilty verdict ==
On March 23, 2010, after a week of deliberation, a Dauphin County jury found former Democratic State House Whip Mike Veon guilty on 14 counts related to using taxpayer-paid bonuses to reward state workers for campaign efforts, illegal campaign fundraising, other campaign efforts and a single count of conflict-of-interest for having aides drive two motorcycles to a North Dakota rally. On June 18, 2010, Veon was sentenced to six to fourteen years imprisonment by Common Pleas Judge Richard A. Lewis. On appeal, the Supreme Court of Pennsylvania cited errors in the trial judges' instructions to the jury and called Veon's original conviction a "criminalization of politics" and a new trial on all counts was ordered(2016)

Also convicted were two former aides, Brett Cott, found guilty on three counts, and Annamarie Perretta-Rosepink, found guilty on five counts. A third aide, Stephen Keefer, was acquitted of all charges against him.

== See also ==
- Pennsylvania General Assembly
- 2005 Pennsylvania General Assembly pay raise controversy
- Frank LaGrotta
- Mike Veon
- List of scandals with "-gate" suffix
- Drew Crompton
- Mike Manzo
- List of Pennsylvania state legislatures
