= List of Widener University alumni =

Widener University is a private university in Chester, Pennsylvania. Following is an incomplete list of its notable alumni.

== Arts ==
Name	Class	Major	Notability	References
Louis Comfort Tiffany			Artist and designer	

== Business ==
Name	Class	Major	Notability	References
Eugene C. Lewis			Businessman, engineer, and chairman of the Nashville, Chattanooga and St. Louis Railway	
Edwin Harrison McHenry			Vice-president of the New York, New Haven and Hartford Railroad and the Consolidated Railway	
Leslie C. Quick Jr.			Founder of Quick & Reilly Inc.	
Cyrus Tang			Businessman and philanthropist	

== Clergy ==
Name	Class	Major	Notability	References
Howard Meeks			Bishop of the Episcopal Diocese of Western Michigan	

== Education ==
Name	Class	Major	Notability	References
Robert Dorsey Coale			Professor of Chemistry and Toxicology and Dean of the Physics Faculty at the University of Maryland, Baltimore	
James T. Harris III			President of the University of San Diego and Widener University	
Ericka Hart			Former adjunct professor at the Columbia School of Social Work and sex educator	
Kathleen Hetherington			President of Howard Community College	
George Michael			Historian, political scientist, writer, and professor at Westfield State University	

== Entertainment ==
Name	Class	Major	Notability	References
Benjamin P. Ablao Jr.			Independent filmmaker and actor	
Cecil B. DeMille			Legendary Hollywood director	
Matthew McGrory			World's tallest actor	
Burt Mustin			Actor, Gus the Fireman on Leave it to Beaver	

== Law ==
Name	Class	Major	Notability	References
Peter J. Barnes III			New Jersey Superior Court judge and New Jersey Senate	
Aimee Belgard			New Jersey Superior Court judge	
Carl Danberg			Attorney general of Delaware, commissioner of the Delaware Department of Correction, and brigadier general in the Delaware Army National Guard	
Faustino J. Fernandez-Vina			Associate justice of the New Jersey Supreme Court	
Alina Habba			Lawyer	
Don McGahn			White House counsel	
Jim Schultz			Associate White House counsel	
Lee Solomon			Associate justice of the Supreme Court of New Jersey	
Margaret M. Sweeney			Senior judge of the United States Court of Federal Claims	
David C. Weiss			United States attorney for the United States District Court for the District of Delaware	

== Literature and journalism ==
Name	Class	Major	Notability	References
Frederick J. Chiaventone			Historian, novelist, screenwriter	
David M. Hall			Writer, editor, and corporate trainer	
Tim Newby	1996		Writer, author	
Brent Staples	1973		New York Times editorial writer and author of Parallel Time	
Brian Tierney			Publisher of The Philadelphia Inquirer and Philadelphia Daily News	
Louis Weitzenkorn			Writer, newspaper editor, and playwright	

== Military ==
Name	Class	Major	Notability	References
Irving J. Carr			U.S. Army major general	
Carl Danberg			Brigadier general in the Delaware Army National Guard, attorney general of Delaware, and commissioner of the Delaware Department of Correction	
Thomas D. Finley	1911		U.S. Army major general	
Terry Halvorsen			Chief information officer at the US Department of Defense and Department of the Navy	
Frederic E. Humphreys			First American military pilot	
Benjamin Ralph Kimlau			World War II hero	
Charles F. B. Price			Lieutenant general of the United States Marines, Legion of Merit recipient	
John H. Tilelli Jr.	1963		United States Army four-star general	

== Politics ==
Name	Class	Major	Notability	References
Dawn Marie Addiego			New Jersey state senator	
Richard Alloway			Pennsylvania state senator	
Jesse Matlack Baker			Pennsylvania state representative and Pennsylvania state senator	
Truxtun Beale			U.S. minister to Persia and U.S. minister to Greece	
Barbara Bohannan-Sheppard			Mayor of Chester, Pennsylvania	
David J. Brightbill			Pennsylvania state senator	
Chris Brown			New Jersey Senate and New Jersey General Assembly	
Chris A. Brown			New Jersey senator	
Michael A. Brown			Council of the District of Columbia	
John H. Carrington			North Carolina Senate	
Mark B. Cohen			Pennsylvania General Assembly	
Carolyn Comitta			Pennsylvania State Senate and Pennsylvania House of Representatives	
Drew Crompton			Political consultant	
William J. Crow			Pennsylvania House of Representatives	
Bryan Cutler			Pennsylvania House of Representatives	
Joseph DeFelice			Former chair of the Philadelphia Republican Party	
Sam Fiocchi			New Jersey General Assembly	
Tom Gannon			Pennsylvania House of Representatives	
Dianne Herrin			Pennsylvania House of Representatives and mayor of West Chester, Pennsylvania	
Tom Houghton			Pennsylvania House of Representatives	
Wayne Langerholc			Pennsylvania state senator	
Walter Francis Layer			Pennsylvania state representative	
John Linder			Mayor of Chester, Pennsylvania	
Mike Missanelli			Sports journalist and host for ESPN	
Patrick J. Murphy			United States House of Representatives and U.S. secretary of the Army	
Julianne Murray			Chair of the Delaware Republican Party	
D. Lane Powers			United States House of Representatives	
Brian Preski			Former legislative staffer and government relations professional	
Robert J. Smith II			New Jersey General Assembly	
Gerald J. Spitz			Pennsylvania House of Representatives	
Todd Stephens			Pennsylvania House of Representatives	
Terry Van Horne			Pennsylvania House of Representatives	

== Science and technology ==
Name	Class	Major	Notability	References
Curtis Henderson			Pioneer in the practice of cryonics	
Brendan Kehoe			Author of Zen and the Art of the Internet: A Beginner's Guide and software developer	
Sylvanus Morley			Archaeologist who led extensive excavations of the Maya site of Chichen Itza on behalf of the Carnegie Institution	
Max C. Starkloff			Physician and health commissioner of St. Louis	
Frank Wilcoxon			Chemist and statistician	

== Sports ==
Name	Class	Major	Notability	References
Dan Borislow			Entrepreneur and sports team owner	
Clarence C. Combs Jr.,			Polo player	
Tom Deery			College Football Hall of Fame inductee	
Joe Fields			New York Jets all-pro center	
Billy "White Shoes" Johnson	1974		NFL 75th Anniversary All-Time Team, College Football Hall of Fame inductee	
Jamarr Johnson			Professional basketball player, 2x IBL Champion, and 2x IBL scoring leader	
Phil Martelli	1976		Former St. Joseph's University head basketball coach	
William A. Nimick			Professional baseball team owner and president	
Pat Quinn			Former NHL coach and general manager	
Roy Sherid			Pitcher for New York Yankees	
Bill Stern			Newsreel and sports commentator	
Bob Swank			Football coach	
William Wesley			Advisor for the New York Knicks	
