= Jerry Pappert =

American judge (born 1963)

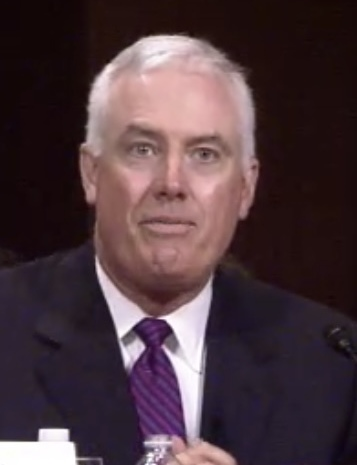
- Pappert in 2014

Judge of the United States District Court for the Eastern District of Pennsylvania
- Incumbent
- Assumed office December 4, 2014
- Appointed by: Barack Obama
- Preceded by: Stewart Dalzell

44th Attorney General of Pennsylvania
- In office December 15, 2003 – January 18, 2005; Acting: December 15, 2003 – February 2, 2004
- Governor: Ed Rendell
- Preceded by: D. Michael Fisher
- Succeeded by: Tom Corbett

Personal details
- Born: Gerald John Pappert; 1963 (age 62–63) Albany, New York, U.S.
- Party: Republican
- Education: Villanova University (BA); Notre Dame University (JD)

Gerald John Pappert (born 1963) is a judge on the United States District Court for the Eastern District of Pennsylvania and former unelected Pennsylvania Attorney General.

== Biography ==
Pappert was born in 1963, in Albany, New York. He received a Bachelor of Arts degree, cum laude, in 1985 from Villanova University. He received a Juris Doctor in 1988 from the Notre Dame Law School. He began his legal career at the law firm of Duane Morris LLP, from 1988 to 1997. He served as the first deputy attorney general of Pennsylvania, from 1997 to 2003, and as the Attorney General of Pennsylvania, from 2003 to 2005. He was a partner at Ballard Spahr LLP, from 2005 to 2008. He served as executive vice president, general counsel and secretary of Cephalon, Inc., from 2008 to 2012. From 2012 to 2014, he was a partner at Cozen O'Connor. He concurrently served as chair of the Pennsylvania Banking and Securities Commission.

=== Federal judicial service ===
On June 16, 2014, President Barack Obama nominated Pappert to serve as a United States district judge of the United States District Court for the Eastern District of Pennsylvania, to the seat vacated by Judge Stewart Dalzell, who assumed senior status on October 31, 2013. On July 24, 2014 a hearing before the United States Senate Committee on the Judiciary was held on his nomination. On September 18, 2014 his nomination was reported out of committee by a voice vote. On December 1, 2014, Senate Majority Leader Harry Reid filed for cloture on his nomination. On December 3, 2014, the United States Senate invoked cloture on his nomination by a 67–28 vote. Later that day, he was confirmed by a voice vote. He received his judicial commission on December 4, 2014.

Legal offices
Preceded by D. Michael Fisher	Attorney General of Pennsylvania; 2003–2005	Succeeded by Tom Corbett
Preceded by Stewart Dalzell	Judge of the United States District Court for the Eastern District of Pennsylvania; 2014–present	Incumbent
