= Stewart Dalzell =

American judge (1943–2019)

Senior Judge of the United States District Court for the Eastern District of Pennsylvania
- In office October 31, 2013 – December 31, 2016

Judge of the United States District Court for the Eastern District of Pennsylvania
- In office September 16, 1991 – October 31, 2013
- Appointed by: George H. W. Bush
- Preceded by: Seat established by 104 Stat. 5089
- Succeeded by: Jerry Pappert

Personal details
- Born: Stewart Richard Dalzell; September 18, 1943 Hackensack, New Jersey
- Died: February 18, 2019 (aged 75) Philadelphia, Pennsylvania
- Education: Wharton School of the University of Pennsylvania (BS); University of Pennsylvania Law School (JD)

Stewart Richard Dalzell (September 18, 1943 – February 18, 2019) was a United States district judge of the United States District Court for the Eastern District of Pennsylvania.

== Education and early career ==
Born in Hackensack, New Jersey, Dalzell graduated from the University of Pennsylvania, Wharton School of Business with a Bachelor of Science degree in 1965 and received his Juris Doctor from the University of Pennsylvania Law School in 1969. Dalzell was a financial analyst for the National Broadcasting Company in New York from 1965 to 1966, and was a visiting lecturer in law at Wharton from 1969 to 1970.

== Legal career ==
From 1970 to 1991, Dalzell was a lawyer in private practice in Philadelphia at the law firm Drinker, Biddle & Reath. In 1971 he served as treasurer for the unsuccessful mayoral campaign of longtime friend W. Thatcher Longstreth, and later was involved in the controversy concerning Philadelphia's Home Rule Charter, which mayor Frank Rizzo sought (unsuccessfully) to amend to allow him to seek an additional term in office. In 1976, Dalzell served as the treasurer for the successful campaign of John Heinz for the United States Senate.

== Federal judicial service ==
Judge Dalzell was nominated by President George H. W. Bush on July 24, 1991 to the United States District Court for the Eastern District of Pennsylvania, to a new seat authorized by 104 Stat. 5089. He was confirmed by the Senate on September 12, 1991, and received commission on September 16, 1991. He assumed senior status on October 31, 2013. His service terminated on December 31, 2016, due to retirement. He died of Alzheimer's disease on February 19, 2019, in Philadelphia.

During his tenure on the bench, Judge Dalzell authored a number of law review articles and essays. See, e.g., Stewart Dalzell & Eric J. Beste, Is the Twenty-Seventh Amendment 200 Years Too Late?, 62 Geo. Wash. L. Rev. 501, 544 (1994) (arguing for the application of judicial review over the constitutional amendment process); Stewart Dalzell, One Cheer for the Guidelines, 40 Vill. L. Rev. 317 (1995) (providing reflections on Sentencing Reform Act); Stewart Dalzell, Judging Technology: An Eighteenth Century Institution Meets Twenty-First Century Cases, 30 Creighton L. Rev. 1107 (1997) (Forward to Law and Technology Issue); Stewart Dalzell, Faces in the Courtroom, 146 U. Pa. L. Rev. 961 (1998) (contending that judges have a duty to constantly recognizing the fact “that in every case there is at least one face, and usually more, who not only looks at what we judges do, but is profoundly and personally affected by our actions”); Stewart Dalzell, A Voice for Liberty, 148 U. Pa. L. Rev. 15 (1999) (A Memorial to Henry W. Sawyer—famed, Philadelphia civil rights attorney).

== Notable cases ==
In 1996, Judge Dalzell penned an opinion in ACLU v. Reno, 929 F. Supp. 824 (E.D. Pa. 1996), as part of a three-judge panel of the District Court pursuant to 47 U.S.C.A. § 561(a). As a member of this panel, Judge Dalzell was one of the first jurists to directly assess the First Amendment status of the Internet. The panel declared the Communications Decency Act unconstitutional and in his separate opinion Judge Dalzell described the Internet as “[t]he most participatory marketplace of mass speech that this country—and indeed the world—has yet seen.” Legal commentators quickly celebrated his opinion as “groundbreaking” and “a welcome break with the American judicial tradition of underestimating the social significance of new media.”. Judge Dalzell's decision finding the anti-indecency provisions of the Communications Decency Act violated the First Amendment was ultimately upheld by nine justices of the United States Supreme Court in Reno v. American Civil Liberties Union. A majority opinion authored by Justice Stevens and joined by six other Justices (Scalia, Kennedy, Souter, Thomas, Ginsburg, and Breyer) affirmed the decision in full. Justice O’Connor, joined by Chief Justice Rehnquist, concurred in the judgment in part and dissented in part.

In 1997, following a 14-day hearing, Judge Dalzell granted Lisa Michelle Lambert’s writ of habeas corpus. See Lambert v. Blackwell, 962 F. Supp. 1521 (E.D. Pa. 1997). Lambert had been convicted of the Murder of Laurie Show, but Judge Dalzell's opinion detailed the compelling evidence unearthed at the hearing that showed the 1992 state trial in which she was convicted had been corrupted by perjury, witness tampering, fabrication of evidence, and the withholding of information crucial for the defense. Judge Dalzell was moved to declare Ms. Lambert “actually innocent” and thoroughly chastised those responsible for the “miscarriage of justice”—concluding that “in making a pact with this devil, Lancaster County made a Faustian Bargain. It lost its soul and it almost executed an innocent, abused woman. Its legal edifice now in ashes, we can only hope for a Witness-like barn-raising of the temple of justice.” Judge Dalzell’s decision was ultimately reversed by the U.S. Court of Appeals for the Third Circuit on procedural grounds—failure to exhaust state remedies. See Lambert v. Blackwell, 134 F.3d 506 (3d Cir. 1997), as amended (Jan. 16, 1998). Four judges of the Third Circuit voted to rehear the case en banc—noting in a dissent from the denial of rehearing that they were “profoundly disturbed by the panel's refusal to consider the merits of Lisa Michelle Lambert's petition for a writ of habeas corpus and by the panel's decision to vacate the judgment of the district court and to remand the case with instructions to dismiss Lambert's petition.” The Editorial Board of the New York Times lauded Judge Dalzell’s decision and decried the Third Circuit’s decision to overturn “Judge Dalzell's decision on flimsy procedural grounds without considering the disturbing evidence in the case.”.

== See also ==
- "Biddle Law Library:". University of Pennsylvania Law School. Archived from the original on August 8, 2012.

Legal offices
Preceded by Seat established by 104 Stat. 5089	Judge of the United States District Court for the Eastern District of Pennsylvania; 1991–2013	Succeeded by Jerry Pappert
