= David J. Porter (judge) =

American judge (born 1966)

David Porter
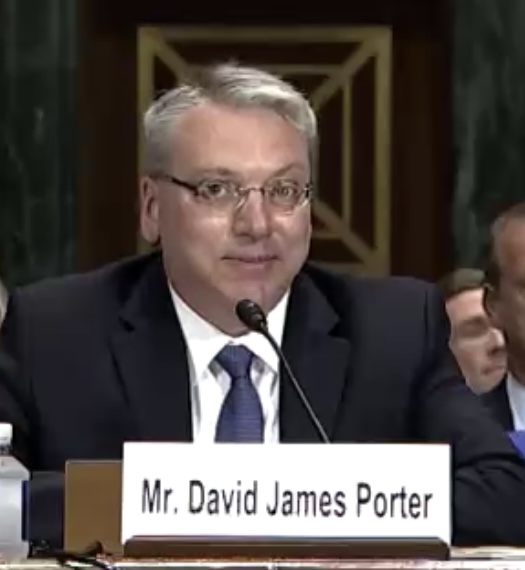

Judge of the United States Court of Appeals for the Third Circuit
- Incumbent
- Assumed office October 15, 2018
- Appointed by: Donald Trump
- Preceded by: D. Michael Fisher

Personal details
- Born: David James Porter; March 8, 1966 (age 60) Kittanning, Pennsylvania, U.S.
- Party: Republican
- Education: Millersville University (attended); Grove City College (BA); George Mason University (JD)

David James Porter (born March 8, 1966) is a United States circuit judge of the United States Court of Appeals for the Third Circuit.

== Early life and education ==
Porter was born on March 8, 1966, in Kittanning, Pennsylvania. After being educated at Millersville University of Pennsylvania, he earned his Bachelor of Arts from Grove City College in 1988 and his Juris Doctor from the George Mason University School of Law (now Antonin Scalia Law School) in 1992, where he served as an articles editor of the George Mason Law Review.

== Legal career ==
After graduating from law school, Porter served as a law clerk to Judge D. Brooks Smith of the United States District Court for the Western District of Pennsylvania from 1992 to 1994. He then joined the law firm Buchanan, Ingersoll & Rooney in Pittsburgh, where practiced in the fields of regulatory law, constitutional law, and commercial litigation.

From 1989 to 1992 he was a member of the Federalist Society; he rejoined in 1995 and has since been President of the Pittsburgh chapter.

In 2014 David J. Porter's name was discussed to be included to the White House as part of a package of judicial nominees between senators Bob Casey (D) and Pat Toomey (R). This was due to a tradition in Pennsylvania that divides judicial nominations on a 3-to-1 ratio when the state's two U.S. senators are of the opposite party. This would allow the White House appointing one judge of the opposing party for three of their own party. Progressives in Pennsylvania scrambled to derail the deal because of David Porter's opposition to abortion, gay marriage and gun control. As a result, his name was removed as part of a deal that would have resulted in him being nominated to the U.S. District Court for the Western District of Pennsylvania.

== Federal judicial service ==
On April 10, 2018, President Donald Trump announced his intent to nominate Porter to serve as a United States Circuit Judge of the United States Court of Appeals for the Third Circuit. Senator Bob Casey Jr. immediately indicated his opposition to Porter's nomination, while Senator Pat Toomey voiced his support. On April 12, 2018, his nomination was sent to the Senate. He was nominated to the seat vacated by Judge D. Michael Fisher, who assumed senior status on February 1, 2017. On June 6, 2018, a hearing on his nomination was held before the Senate Judiciary Committee. On July 19, 2018, his nomination was reported out of committee by an 11–10 vote. On October 11, 2018, the United States Senate confirmed his nomination by a 50–45 vote. He received his judicial commission on October 15, 2018.

=== Notable rulings ===
In May 2020, Porter wrote for the unanimous panel when it found that the University of the Sciences breached its contractual promise of a fair process when it expelled a student accused of campus sexual assault without providing a live hearing or an opportunity to cross examine witnesses.

Legal offices
Preceded by D. Michael Fisher	Judge of the United States Court of Appeals for the Third Circuit; 2018–present	Incumbent
