= Nora Dowd Eisenhower =

American politician (born 1953)

- Born: December 1953 (age 72–73)
- Education: Stony Brook University; Antioch University

Nora Anne Dowd Eisenhower (née Dowd; born December, 1953), daughter to Thomas F. and Anne M. (Ruskan) Dowd, is a public administrator and attorney who specialises in issues of aging. She is the state President of Pennsylvania AARP.

She was the Executive Director of Philadelphia Mayor Jim Kenney's Commission on Aging and was Assistant Director for the Office of Older Americans at the U.S. Consumer Financial Protection Bureau. She served in Governor Ed Rendell's cabinet as the Secretary of the Department of Aging. She also served on the Governor's Cabinet on Children and Families. She led Rendell's successful effort to expand the PACE program, the Commonwealth's program to aid senior's with Prescription drug costs. It was the largest such expansion in the history of the Commonwealth. She was twice unanimously confirmed by the Pennsylvania Senate as Secretary. She was Secretary of the Pennsylvania Department of Aging from 2002 to 2008. Between 2011 and 2013 she was affiliated with the National Council on Aging where she was the Director of the National Center for Benefits Outreach and Enrollment, then the Senior Vice President of Economic Security. In 2013 she joined the Consumer Financial Protection Bureau to serve as the head of the Office for Older Americans. Earlier, from 2000 to 2002, she served as the AARP state director for Pennsylvania. In 2023 she was selected as AARP Pennsylvania Volunteer State President.

Born in Manhattan, Nora was raised in Long Island, NY. She attended Saint Joseph's Parochial school and Sachem High School, Long Island, NY. She received her bachelor's degree from State University of New York at Stony Brook attending as a Governor's Regents Scholar. After earning her J.D. degree from Antioch University during which she served as an aide to US Congressman Tom Downey (D.NY), and working in publishing in Oxford, UK, she was a staff attorney at the Federal Trade Commission in Washington, D.C., where she prosecuted telemarketing fraud and other cases of consumer fraud. She later served as Pennsylvania Deputy Attorney General in the Bureau of Consumer Protection. She chaired the Attorney General's Special Commission on Aging, dealing primarily with fraud on the elderly. She is married to Jim Eisenhower. They have two children and two grandchildren.
