= 1986 Pennsylvania gubernatorial election =

- November 4, 1986
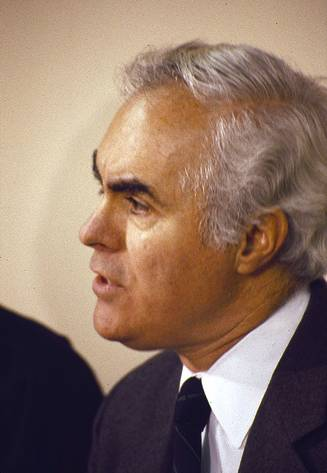

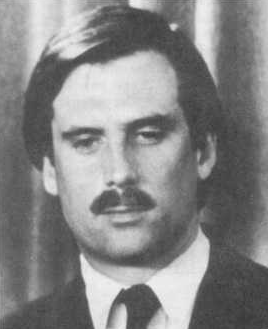
Nominee	Bob Casey	Bill Scranton III
Party	Democratic	Republican
Running mate	Mark Singel	Mike Fisher
Popular vote	1,717,484	1,638,268
Percentage	50.69%	48.34%
- Casey: 50–60% 60–70% 70–80% 80–90% >90% Scranton: 40–50% 50–60% 60–70% 70–80% 80–90% >90% Tie
Governor before election
Dick Thornburgh
Republican
Elected Governor
Robert P. Casey
Democratic

The 1986 Pennsylvania gubernatorial election was held on November 4, 1986. Democrat Bob Casey narrowly defeated Republican Bill Scranton III, in a race that featured two very high-profile candidates.

As of 2024, this is the most recent Pennsylvania gubernatorial race to have a margin within five points for either party. This is the most recent time that the state voted for different parties for Senate and Governor in the same election.

== Republican primary ==
Lt. Governor Bill Scranton III ran unopposed for the Republican nomination.

== Democratic primary ==
=== Candidates ===
- Bob Casey, former Auditor General of Pennsylvania
- Ed Rendell, District Attorney of Philadelphia

The affable Casey had a reformist but conservative track record that made him popular in rural areas and unionized towns, while Rendell had a strong urban base. Rendell would later be elected Governor in 2002.

=== Results ===
After being defeated in the Democratic primary for governor on three prior occasions, Casey finally won his party's nod.

Democratic primary results Casey: 40%–50%; 50%–60%; 60%–70%; 70%–80%; 80%–90%; 90%–100%; Rendell: 40%–50%; 50%–60%; 60%–70%

1986 Democratic gubernatorial primary
Party	Candidate	Votes	%
Democratic	Bob Casey	549,376	56.45
Democratic	Ed Rendell	385,539	39.62
Democratic	Steve Douglas	38,295	3.94
Total votes		973,210	100.00

== General election ==
=== Candidates ===
- Bob Casey, former Auditor General (Democratic)
  - running mate: Mark Singel, State Senator from Johnstown
- Heidi Hoover (Consumer)
  - running mate: John Brickhouse
- Bill Scranton III, Lieutenant Governor (Republican)
  - running mate: Mike Fisher, State Senator from Upper St. Clair

=== Campaign ===
Casey, a moderate with strong labor ties and anti-abortion viewpoints informed by his Catholicism, was often to the right of his Republican opponent on social issues; Scranton, whose father was a leading moderate, was pro-choice and attempted to connect with the fiscally conservative but socially progressive suburban voter.

The race featured back-and-forth polling in the months preceding the election, with the public demonstrating generally positive views toward both figures, but growing weary of their negative campaigning that dominated the contest. Late in the campaign, then-unknown political consultant James Carville commissioned what became known as "the guru ad" for Casey. Aired mainly in rural areas, the ad emphasized Scranton's wealthy family background, use of recreational drugs as a college student, and open practice of and advocacy for transcendental meditation (with the image of the Maharishi Mahesh Yogi accompanied by "Indian"-sounding music); as a result, Casey appeared as the more socially conservative and less corrupt candidate, which helped him to a strong performance for a Democrat in traditionally Republican areas of Central Pennsylvania.

=== Results ===
1986 Pennsylvania gubernatorial election
Party	Candidate	Votes	%
Democratic	Bob Casey	1,717,484	50.69
Republican	Bill Scranton III	1,638,268	48.35
Consumer	Heidi Hoover	33,523	0.96
Total votes		3,388,275	100.00
Democratic gain from Republican			
