= Brian Preski =

American political consultant

- Education: Saint Joseph's University; Widener University School of Law
- Political party: Republican

Brian Preski is a Pennsylvania Republican former legislative staffer and government relations professional. He was a long-term legislative aide, working as chief of staff for former Speaker of the Pennsylvania House of Representatives John Perzel.

== Education and early career ==
Preski is a graduate of Widener University School of Law (J.D., 1992) and St. Joseph's University (B.A., 1987).

He began his career in Philadelphia, where he served in the district attorney's office as an assistant district attorney in multiple administrations. Early in his career, Preski was tapped to represent the district attorney and the citizens of Philadelphia in federal court, as the city fought a cap on prison crowding. Although at the time assigned to the Civil Litigation Unit, he was also asked to accept the duties of assistant chief of the Prison Litigation Unit. He immediately began his practice in the U.S. District Court for the Eastern District of Pennsylvania and the Third Circuit Court of Appeals, representing the district attorney and the office in civil rights litigation.

== Career ==
Preski was known for his "long hours, his dedication to the job and his keen sense of politics." In 2003, the Pennsylvania Report described him as the "must-see staffer in the House on all-important matters." The political website PoliticsPA said that he "has more brainpower than just about anyone else in Harrisburg."

In 2002 and 2003, he was named to "Sy Snyder's Power 50" list of politically influential people in Pennsylvania. Preski was named to the Pennsylvania Report "Power 75" list. He was named to the PoliticsPA list of "Pennsylvania's Smartest Staffers and Operatives."

Preski is president of a lobbying firm called Cerberus Government Strategies, LLC, and director of Government Affairs at Patch Management, Inc. He is not engaged in the practice of law, nor is he entitled to practice law. In 2017, he became vice president of Pennsylvania Water Specialties Company (PAWSC) and National Water Specialties Company (NAWSC). These companies are leaders in the field of cross-connection control and backflow prevention services to water authorities, utilities and private entities. In 2019, Preski was elevated to president of NAWSC and PAWSC.

Preski served as chief of staff to Pennsylvania House Speaker John M. Perzel. As such, Preski was involved in every piece of legislation enacted in Pennsylvania from 1995 through 2006. These enactments resulted in the turnaround of the Philadelphia School System, the labor agreement of the Pennsylvania Convention Center, the creation of casino gambling under the Gaming Control Act, the enactment of medical malpractice reforms, tort reforms, the Electric and Gas Deregulation Acts, and revisions to the Commonwealth Tax Code. Preski acted as the caucus' chief staff negotiator for Pennsylvania's $25 billion general fund budget during these years.

Preski has a long history of state government service. During his tenure as chief of staff to the speaker, he was also called upon to also act as the chief clerk to the House of Representatives. He was asked to accept this dual role upon the retirement of the prior long-serving chief clerk, when he was recognized as the proper person with the requisite management experience, temperament and ability to administer the procedural and administrative operations for the nonpartisan House Core employees. The history-making appointment of Preski to the position occurred when the opposing political leaders could not agree on any other person to fill this role as a search was conducted for a new chief clerk. Prior to his time in the Speaker's Office, he served as chief of staff to the Office of the Majority Leader and chief counsel to the Committee on the Judiciary. During his time on the Judiciary Committee, Preski worked with Governor Thomas Ridge and wrote many of the laws enacted during the extremely successful "1995 Special Session on Crime." This special session of the Commonwealth's General Assembly saw the enactment of 37 new crime laws within the Commonwealth, including streamlining death penalty appeals, Megan's Law, "Three Strikes and You're Out" sentencing and direct filing of juvenile offenders.

Preski was requested by Attorney General Michael Fisher to serve on the Attorney General's Task Force on School Safety; by Pennsylvania Supreme Court Chief Justice Ralph J. Cappy to serve on the Intergovernmental Task Force to Study the District Justice System; and by Speaker Perzel to co-chair the Speaker's "Lawyers who Lobby" Task Force.

== After release ==
Preski is an active member of the Philadelphia business community, having served as chair of the board of directors of the Philadelphia Regional Port Authority. During his tenure as chairman, the Port Authority saw a more than 15 percent increase in cargo flow, and he instituted the channel deepening project.

In 2019, Preski became a member of the Citizens Crime Commission of Philadelphia and the Delaware Valley. The Citizens Crime Commission is a non-profit, non-governmental advisory and educational organization that fights crime by working with law enforcement agencies and the judicial system. It operates with a staff of specially trained criminal justice professionals, including attorneys and police officers.

Preski has served on an advisory board to the MAsT Charter school. He also served as vice president of the board of directors of the Delaware River Maritime Enterprise Council; vice chair of the Pennsylvania Supreme Court Criminal Rules Procedural Committee; and a member of the board of directors of Evangelical Services for the Aging/Wesley Enhanced Living. He also served as a member of the boards of directors of the Drexel University School of Medicine, Historic Fort Mifflin, Nazareth Hospital/Mercy Health Systems, and WYBE. He is vice chairman of the board of directors of the Greater Philadelphia Film Office.

== Awards and recognition ==
In recognition of his community activities, Preski was given the 2006 Alumnus of the Year Award by the Widener University School of Law; the 2006 Spirit of Life Award by the City of Hope National Cancer Treatment Center; the 2001 Distinguished Service Award by the Fraternal Order of Police; and the 1997 Distinguished Service Award by the Pennsylvania District Attorney's Association.

== Investigation ==
During the investigation of the use of taxpayer money for partisan party politics and campaigning known as the 2006 Pennsylvania General Assembly bonus controversy, or Bonusgate, Preski was chief of staff to House of Representatives Speaker John Perzel, who used public money for the development of computer programs to help identify and target Republican voters. Preski was convicted and sent to prison for 2–4 years, and was ordered to repay $1 million in restitution. Upon review, a panel of the Pennsylvania Superior Court found the $1 million restitution to be illegal, and vacated it immediately, though the two to four years sentence was allowed to stand.

Substantial questions concerning prosecutorial misconduct in the investigation and conduct of this case engaged in by the Office of the Attorney General led to the review of this matter by the Pennsylvania Superior Court. Also, because of their concern with the conduct of the Office of the Attorney General in the conduct of this case, the Pennsylvania Supreme Court formed a task force concerning grand jury practices.

"Recent high-profile trials have focused attention on investigating grand juries and the important role they play in the justice system," Chief Justice Thomas G. Saylor said. "It is good policy to periodically evaluate operations and make updates and improvements where warranted."

"As a comprehensive review of Pennsylvania's investigating grand juries has not taken place in recent memory, the Supreme Court has formed this task force to prepare a public report detailing current operations of grand juries and advancing proposals for possible improvement," Saylor added. Issues to be probed include the scope and nature of grand jury secrecy, the roles of the supervising judge and the commonwealth attorney, gag orders, and the swearing of lawyers to secrecy.
