= 2004 Pennsylvania Attorney General election =

- November 2, 2004
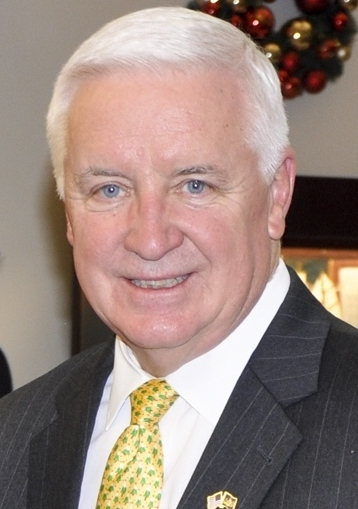

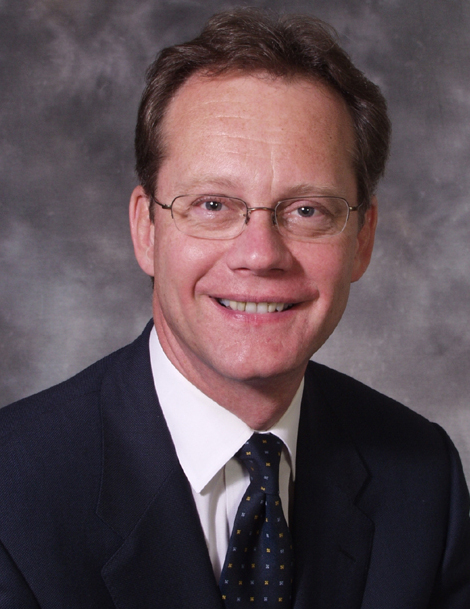
Nominee	Tom Corbett	Jim Eisenhower
Party	Republican	Democratic
Popular vote	2,730,718	2,621,927
Percentage	50.4%	48.3%
- County results Corbett: 40-50% 50-60% 60-70% 70-80% Eisenhower: 40–50% 50–60% 80–90%
Attorney General before election
Michael Fisher
Republican
Elected Attorney General
Tom Corbett
Republican

Pennsylvania's Attorney General election was held November 2, 2004. Necessary primary elections were held on April 27, 2004. Tom Corbett was elected attorney general, a position that he had held from 1995 to 1997 after being appointed by Governor Tom Ridge to fill a vacancy. Corbett, who had been a U.S. Attorney, narrowly defeated Montgomery County District Attorney Bruce Castor in the Republican primary, then won by an even tighter margin in the general election. Corbett's Democratic opponent was Jim Eisenhower, the 2000 nominee who had once served as an Assistant U.S. Attorney and had been a close confidant of Governor Ed Rendell. Eisenhower won in a primary that featured three top-tier candidates: his opponents were David Barasch, a former U.S. Attorney, and John Morganelli, the Northampton County District Attorney who was narrowly defeated by Eisenhower in the previous Democratic primary for this position.

== Republican primary ==
In the Republican primary, Bruce Castor was supported by Mike Fisher, Rob Gleason, Frank Bartle and Fred Anton. Tom Corbett was supported by Chris Bravacos, Stan Rapp, Bob Asher, David Girard DiCarlo, and Jeff Piccola. Joe Peters was supported by Paul Evanko, Roger Madigan, Frank Rizzo, and Bill Scranton.

== Results ==
=== Democratic primary ===
2004 Pennsylvania Attorney General Democratic primary
Party	Candidate	Votes	%
Democratic	Jim Eisenhower	282,515	38.3
Democratic	John Morganelli	246,765	33.5
Democratic	David Barasch	207,560	28.2
Total votes		736,840	100.0

=== Republican primary ===
2004 Pennsylvania Attorney General Republican primary
Party	Candidate	Votes	%
Republican	Tom Corbett	491,651	52.8
Republican	Bruce Castor	439,711	47.2
Total votes		931,362	100.0

=== General election ===
Pennsylvania Attorney General election, 2004
Party	Candidate	Votes	%
Republican	Tom Corbett	2,730,718	50.4
Democratic	Jim Eisenhower	2,621,927	48.3
Green	Marakay Rogers	70,624	1.3
Total votes		5,423,269	100.0
Republican hold			
