= 2008 Pennsylvania Attorney General election =

- November 4, 2008
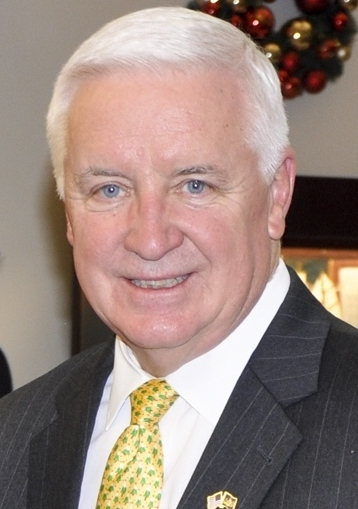

| Nominee | Tom Corbett | John Morganelli |
| Party | Republican | Democratic |
| Popular vote | 3,002,927 | 2,619,791 |
| Percentage | 52.36% | 45.84% |
- County results Corbett: 50–60% 60–70% 70–80% Morganelli: 40–50% 50–60% 60–70% 70–80%
Attorney General before election
Tom Corbett
Republican
Elected Attorney General
Tom Corbett
Republican

The Pennsylvania Attorney General election of 2008 was held on November 4, 2008. The primary election was held on April 22. A Republican would not be elected Attorney General of Pennsylvania again until 2024.

== Candidates ==
Incumbent Republican Tom Corbett of Shaler Township was unopposed in the Republican Party, as he ran for a second term. Democrat John Morganelli of Bethlehem also was unopposed; the Northampton County District Attorney had been defeated in his party's primary for this position in both 2000 and 2004. Morganelli attempted to cast himself as a conservative Democrat, and he has shown a strong opposition to illegal immigration; he has testified on this issue before the United States House Judiciary Subcommittee on Immigration, Border Security, and Claims. Libertarian Marakay Rogers, who also ran for governor in 2006 was the third candidate in the field.

== Results ==
On November 4, 2008, Tom Corbett won the Pennsylvania State Attorney General position in the general election.

2008 Pennsylvania Attorney General election
| Party | Candidate | Votes | % | ±% |
|---|---|---|---|---|
| Republican | Tom Corbett (incumbent) | 3,002,927 | 52.36 | |
| Democratic | John Morganelli | 2,619,791 | 45.84 | |
| Libertarian | Marakay Rogers | 109,856 | 1.89 | |
| Total votes | | 5732574 | 100.0 | |
| Republican hold | | | | |

== See also ==
- Pennsylvania elections, 2008
