= 2002 Pennsylvania gubernatorial election =

- November 5, 2002
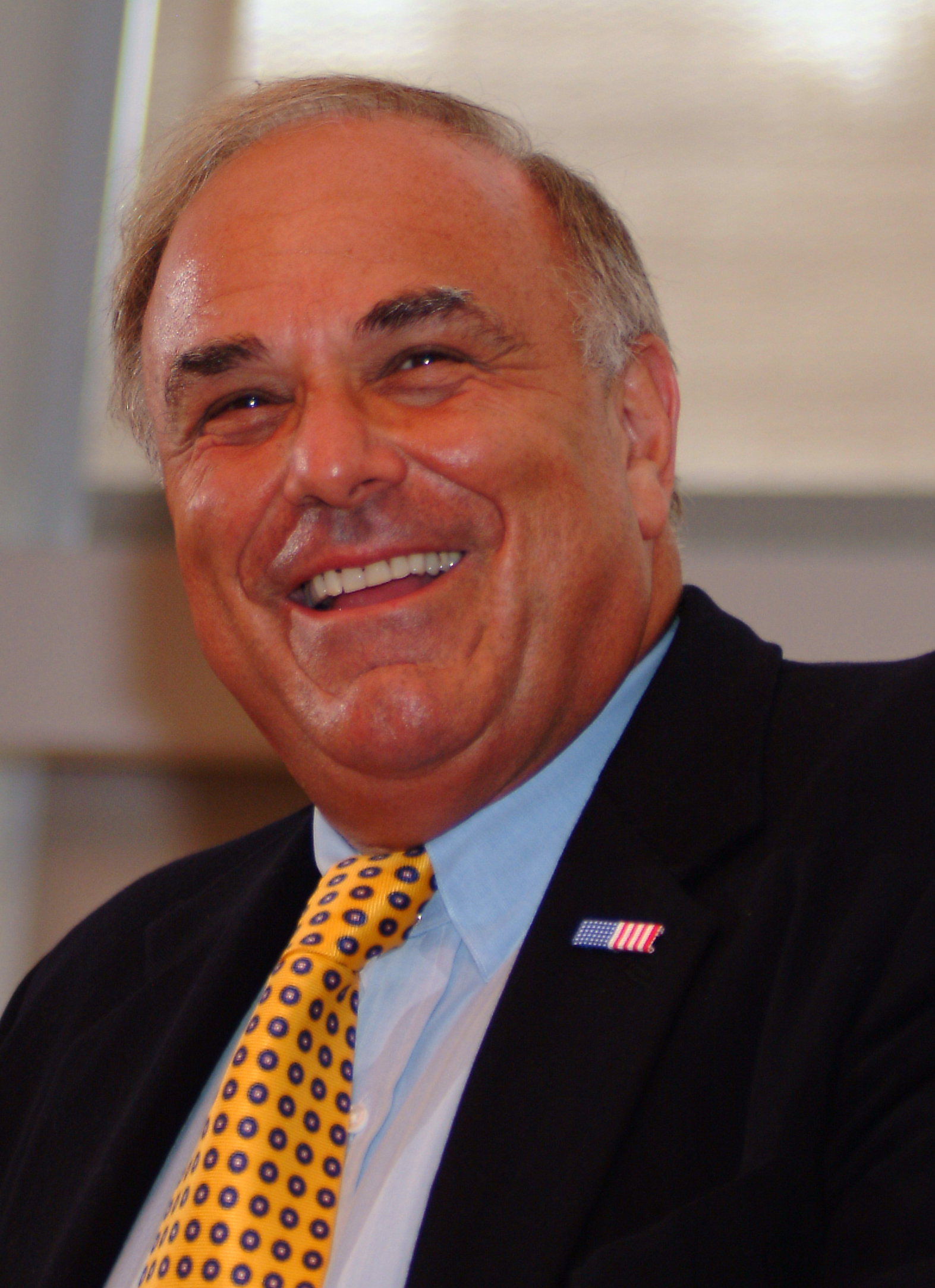

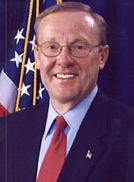
Nominee	Ed Rendell	Mike Fisher
Party	Democratic	Republican
Running mate	Catherine Baker Knoll	Jane Earll
Popular vote	1,913,235	1,589,408
Percentage	53.41%	44.37%
- Rendell: 50–60% 60–70% 70–80% 80–90% >90% Fisher: 40–50% 50–60% 60–70% 70–80% 80–90% >90% Tie: 50% No data
Governor before election
Mark Schweiker
Republican
Elected Governor
Ed Rendell
Democratic

The 2002 Pennsylvania gubernatorial election was held on November 5, 2002, to elect the governor and lieutenant governor of Pennsylvania. Incumbent Republican Governor Mark Schweiker, who took office in 2001 when Tom Ridge resigned to become Homeland Security advisor, was eligible to run for a full term, but did not do so. Democrat Ed Rendell, the former mayor of Philadelphia and Chair of the Democratic National Committee, emerged from a primary against Bob Casey Jr. to win the general election against Republican Pennsylvania Attorney General Mike Fisher.

Rendell was the first official from Philadelphia to win the governorship since 1914. This was the first time since 1826 that a Democrat won all four of Philadelphia's suburban counties, and the first time since 1970 that a Democrat won Montgomery County in a gubernatorial election.

== Republican primary ==
Attorney General Mike Fisher ran unopposed for the Republican nomination. Although incumbent Governor Mark Schweiker was eligible to run for election to a full term (he had served only a partial term after Tom Ridge resigned to become Homeland Security advisor), he chose not to seek his party's nomination. Despite polls showing that Schweiker polled well among the same groups that backed Ridge, the Republican establishment considered Schweiker to be a weak candidate and stood steadfast behind Fisher.

== Democratic primary ==
=== Candidates ===
- Bob Casey Jr., incumbent auditor general and son of former Governor Bob Casey Sr.
- Ed Rendell, former mayor of Philadelphia and candidate in 1986

=== Campaign ===
In the Democratic primary, former mayor of Philadelphia Ed Rendell defeated Pennsylvania Auditor General Bob Casey Jr., bucking the "myth that a Philadelphian could never win" a statewide election. Despite strong support from organized labor for Casey, Rendell's ability to cast himself as a strong executive as well as Casey's pro-life stances allowed Rendell to pull out a primary win.

=== Results ===
Democratic primary results Rendell: 50%–60%; 60%–70%; 70%–80%; 80%–90%; Casey: 50%–60%; 60%–70%; 70%–80%; 80%–90%

Pennsylvania gubernatorial primary election, 2002
Party	Candidate	Votes	%
Democratic	Ed Rendell	702,442	56.55
Democratic	Bob Casey Jr.	539,794	43.45
Total votes		1,242,236	100.00

== General election ==
=== Campaign ===
Fisher emphasized Rendell's Philadelphia roots continuously during his campaign and described the mayor as an urban liberal whose programs would require huge tax increases.

=== Polling ===
Poll source	Date(s) administered	Sample size (Note: Key: A – all adults RV – registered voters LV – likely voters V – unclear)	Margin of error	Ed Rendell (D)	Mike Fisher (R)	Other / Undecided
SurveyUSA	October 26–28, 2002	668 (LV)	± 3.9%	56%	37%	7%

=== Predictions ===
Source	Ranking	As of
The Cook Political Report	Lean D (flip)	October 31, 2002
Sabato's Crystal Ball	Likely D (flip)	November 4, 2002

=== Results ===
Pennsylvania gubernatorial election, 2002
Party	Candidate	Votes	%
Democratic	Ed Rendell	1,913,235	53.40
Republican	Mike Fisher	1,589,408	44.40
Libertarian	Ken V. Krawchuk	40,923	1.14
Green	Mike Morrill	38,423	1.07
Total votes		3,581,989	100.00
Democratic gain from Republican			

==== Results by county ====
County	Ed Rendell Democratic		Mike Fisher Republican		Ken Krawchuk Libertarian		Michael Morrill Green		Margin		Total votes cast
County	#	%	#	%	#	%	#	%	#	%	Total votes cast
Adams	7,732	31.99%	15,950	65.98%	199	0.82%	292	1.21%	-8,218	-33.99%	24,173
Allegheny	209,708	53.66%	169,414	43.35%	6,673	1.71%	4,991	1.28%	40,294	10.31%	390,786
Armstrong	7,965	39.11%	11,898	58.43%	288	1.41%	213	1.05%	-3,933	-19.32%	20,364
Beaver	27,322	52.05%	23,744	45.23%	791	1.51%	636	1.21%	3,578	6.82%	52,493
Bedford	4,516	30.24%	10,190	68.23%	98	0.66%	130	0.87%	-5,674	-37.99%	14,934
Berks	56,592	55.20%	43,790	42.71%	1,027	1.00%	1,119	1.09%	12,802	12.49%	102,528
Blair	10,356	29.99%	23,530	68.15%	307	0.89%	336	0.97%	-13,174	-38.16%	34,529
Bradford	4,947	30.83%	10,815	67.40%	130	0.81%	155	0.97%	-5,868	-36.57%	16,047
Bucks	127,850	63.28%	70,000	34.64%	2,685	1.33%	1,516	0.75%	57,850	28.64%	202,051
Butler	18,145	34.91%	32,400	62.34%	768	1.48%	659	1.27%	-14,255	-27.43%	51,972
Cambria	20,305	43.39%	25,556	54.61%	480	1.03%	455	0.97%	-5,251	-11.22%	46,796
Cameron	571	35.07%	1,032	63.39%	10	0.61%	15	0.92%	-461	-28.32%	1,628
Carbon	8,598	54.79%	6,600	42.05%	288	1.84%	208	1.33%	1,998	12.74%	15,692
Centre	14,557	41.71%	19,027	54.52%	397	1.14%	918	2.63%	-4,470	-12.81%	34,899
Chester	81,996	57.41%	58,669	41.08%	1,159	0.81%	990	0.69%	23,327	16.33%	142,814
Clarion	3,934	34.08%	7,397	64.08%	103	0.89%	109	0.94%	-3,463	-30.00%	11,543
Clearfield	10,221	41.64%	13,822	56.32%	232	0.95%	269	1.10%	-3,601	-14.68%	24,544
Clinton	4,341	47.79%	4,434	48.81%	115	1.27%	194	2.14%	-93	-1.02%	9,084
Columbia	7,004	41.89%	9,304	55.65%	147	0.88%	263	1.57%	-2,300	-13.76%	16,718
Crawford	9,155	35.74%	15,551	60.71%	498	1.94%	411	1.60%	-6,396	-24.97%	25,615
Cumberland	24,237	36.31%	40,966	61.37%	761	1.14%	788	1.18%	-16,729	-25.06%	66,752
Dauphin	33,537	42.05%	44,231	55.45%	1,016	1.27%	980	1.23%	-10,694	-13.40%	79,764
Delaware	123,117	65.12%	62,649	33.14%	2,044	1.08%	1,260	0.67%	60,468	31.98%	189,070
Elk	3,917	40.87%	5,468	57.05%	105	1.10%	95	0.99%	-1,551	-16.18%	9,585
Erie	32,774	41.72%	43,095	54.85%	1,071	1.36%	1,623	2.07%	-10,321	-13.13%	78,563
Fayette	19,082	56.56%	13,878	41.14%	497	1.47%	279	0.83%	5,204	15.42%	33,736
Forest	613	33.76%	1,170	64.43%	14	0.77%	19	1.05%	-557	-30.67%	1,816
Franklin	10,335	29.93%	23,689	68.61%	222	0.64%	279	0.81%	-13,354	-38.68%	34,525
Fulton	1,138	29.47%	2,681	69.42%	33	0.85%	10	0.26%	-1,543	-39.95%	3,862
Greene	5,013	53.02%	4,209	44.52%	89	0.94%	144	1.52%	804	8.50%	9,455
Huntingdon	3,697	31.18%	7,842	66.13%	77	0.65%	242	2.04%	-4,145	-34.95%	11,858
Indiana	9,897	41.26%	13,462	56.12%	203	0.85%	424	1.77%	-3,565	-14.86%	23,986
Jefferson	3,879	30.02%	8,745	67.67%	150	1.16%	149	1.15%	-4,866	-37.65%	12,923
Juniata	2,187	29.76%	5,027	68.40%	62	0.84%	73	0.99%	-2,840	-38.64%	7,349
Lackawanna	40,206	58.22%	26,099	37.79%	1,888	2.73%	868	1.26%	14,107	20.43%	69,061
Lancaster	40,791	32.23%	83,607	66.07%	871	0.69%	1,280	1.01%	-42,816	-33.84%	126,549
Lawrence	14,628	52.01%	13,010	46.25%	244	0.87%	245	0.87%	1,618	5.76%	28,127
Lebanon	12,712	35.17%	22,659	62.69%	452	1.25%	323	0.89%	-9,947	-27.52%	36,146
Lehigh	48,150	56.72%	34,738	40.92%	1,074	1.27%	934	1.10%	13,412	15.80%	84,896
Luzerne	45,641	52.61%	38,760	44.68%	891	1.03%	1,454	1.68%	6,881	7.93%	86,746
Lycoming	9,937	31.47%	20,751	65.72%	357	1.13%	532	1.68%	-10,814	-34.25%	31,577
McKean	3,215	32.76%	6,373	64.94%	131	1.33%	94	0.96%	-3,158	-32.18%	9,813
Mercer	14,161	45.13%	16,429	52.36%	343	1.09%	444	1.42%	-2,268	-7.23%	31,377
Mifflin	3,362	31.32%	7,122	66.35%	161	1.50%	89	0.83%	-3,760	-35.03%	10,734
Monroe	14,570	47.34%	15,258	49.57%	447	1.45%	503	1.63%	-688	-2.23%	30,778
Montgomery	175,157	67.16%	81,835	31.38%	2,121	0.81%	1,690	0.65%	93,322	35.78%	260,803
Montour	1,847	38.00%	2,873	59.10%	57	1.17%	84	1.73%	-1,026	-21.10%	4,861
Northampton	42,554	58.52%	28,228	38.82%	1,088	1.50%	846	1.16%	14,326	19.70%	72,716
Northumberland	10,774	41.52%	14,479	55.80%	382	1.47%	313	1.21%	-3,705	-14.28%	25,948
Perry	3,426	26.28%	9,286	71.22%	165	1.27%	161	1.23%	-5,860	-44.94%	13,038
Philadelphia	339,697	84.08%	59,223	14.66%	1,976	0.49%	3,129	0.77%	280,474	69.42%	404,025
Pike	4,049	37.46%	6,482	59.97%	124	1.15%	154	1.42%	-2,433	-22.51%	10,809
Potter	1,357	27.67%	3,471	70.76%	38	0.77%	39	0.80%	-2,114	-43.09%	4,905
Schuylkill	25,233	51.47%	22,692	46.29%	515	1.05%	585	1.19%	2,541	5.18%	49,025
Snyder	2,599	27.59%	6,623	70.32%	67	0.71%	130	1.38%	-4,024	-42.73%	9,419
Somerset	8,088	32.64%	16,244	65.56%	189	0.76%	257	1.04%	-8,156	-32.92%	24,778
Sullivan	856	36.27%	1,441	61.06%	31	1.31%	32	1.36%	-585	-24.79%	2,360
Susquehanna	4,244	33.35%	8,175	64.25%	104	0.82%	201	1.58%	-3,931	-30.90%	12,724
Tioga	3,275	29.41%	7,696	69.12%	62	0.56%	101	0.91%	-4,421	-39.71%	11,134
Union	3,153	33.27%	6,058	63.93%	74	0.78%	191	2.02%	-2,905	-30.66%	9,476
Venango	5,551	36.54%	9,188	60.48%	238	1.57%	214	1.41%	-3,637	-23.94%	15,191
Warren	4,823	40.45%	6,823	57.22%	125	1.05%	153	1.28%	-2,000	-16.77%	11,924
Washington	30,368	50.67%	28,368	47.33%	642	1.07%	560	0.93%	2,000	3.34%	59,938
Wayne	4,395	33.87%	8,118	62.56%	119	0.92%	344	2.65%	-3,723	-28.69%	12,976
Westmoreland	48,992	44.77%	58,018	53.01%	1,447	1.32%	980	0.90%	-9,026	-8.24%	109,437
Wyoming	2,938	35.31%	5,152	61.92%	70	0.84%	161	1.93%	-2,214	-26.61%	8,321
York	33,248	33.27%	63,894	63.94%	1,691	1.69%	1,088	1.09%	-30,646	-30.67%	99,921
Totals	1,913,235	53.41%	1,589,408	44.37%	40,923	1.14%	38,423	1.07%	323,827	9.04%	3,581,989

Counties that flipped from Republican to Democratic

- Allegheny (largest city: Pittsburgh)
- Beaver (largest city: Beaver)
- Fayette (largest city: Uniontown)
- Carbon (largest municipality: Lehighton)
- Schuylkill (largest city: Pottsville)
- Bucks (largest municipality: Bensalem)
- Berks (largest city: Reading)
- Chester (largest municipality: West Chester)
- Greene (largest municipality: Waynesburg)
- Delaware (largest city: Upper Darby)
- Lackawanna (largest city: Scranton)
- Montgomery (largest city: Lower Merion)
- Lawrence (largest municipality: New Castle)
- Luzerne (largest municipality: Wilkes-Barre)
- Lehigh (largest municipality: Allentown)
- Northampton (largest municipality: Bethlehem)
- Washington (largest municipality: Peters Township)
