= 2000 Pennsylvania Attorney General election =

- November 7, 2000
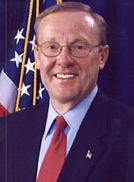

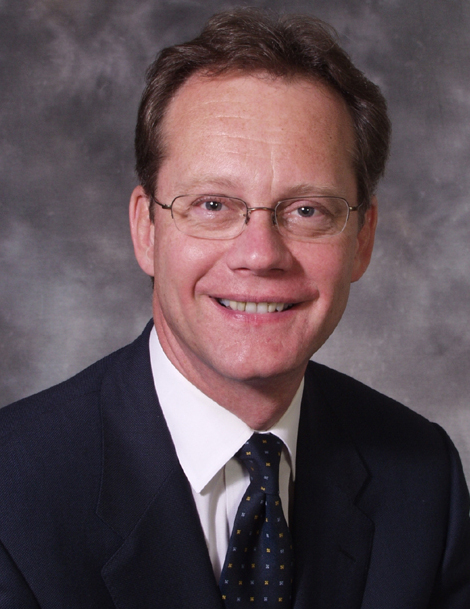
Nominee	Michael Fisher	Jim Eisenhower
Party	Republican	Democratic
Popular vote	2,495,253	1,991,144
Percentage	54.02%	43.10%
- County results Fisher: 40-50% 50-60% 60-70% 70-80% Eisenhower: 40–50% 50–60% 70–80%
Attorney General before election
Tom Corbett
Republican
Elected Attorney General
Michael Fisher
Republican

Pennsylvania's Attorney General election was held November 7, 2000. Necessary primary elections were held on April 4, 2000. Incumbent Mike Fisher was unopposed for the Republican nomination and won a second term by a relatively comfortable margin. Jim Eisenhower, a former Assistant U.S. Attorney and close confidant of Ed Rendell was the Democratic nominee; he earned a narrow victory in the party primary over John Morganelli, the District Attorney of Northampton County.

== General election ==
Pennsylvania Attorney General election, 2000
Party	Candidate	Votes	%
Republican	Mike Fisher	2,495,253	54.0
Democratic	Jim Eisenhower	1,991,144	43.1
Green	Tom Linzey	61,216	1.3
Libertarian	Julian Heicklen	41,519	0.9
Constitution	Jim Clymer	30,306	0.7

== Primary Election ==
Pennsylvania Attorney General primary election, 2000
Party	Candidate	Votes	%
Democratic	Jim Eisenhower	304,097	50.8
Democratic	John Morganelli	294,030	49.2
