= Jim Eisenhower =

American lawyer and judge (born 1958)

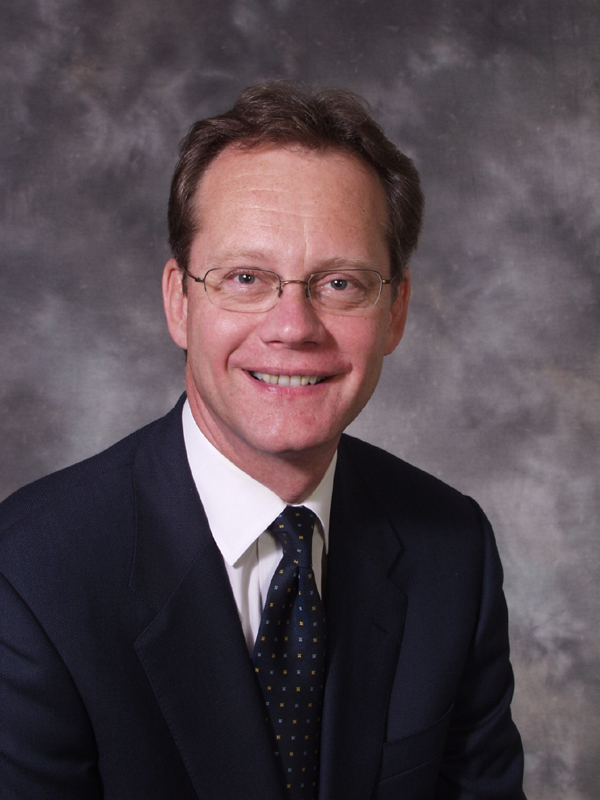

Judge of the Court of Common Pleas, Philadelphia
- Incumbent
- Assumed office 2023

Chair of the Pennsylvania Commission on Crime and Delinquency
- In office 2003–2004

Personal details
- Born: January 30, 1958 (age 68) Philadelphia, Pennsylvania, U.S.
- Party: Democratic
- Spouse: Nora Dowd Eisenhower
- Education: Temple University (BA); Antioch School of Law (JD); Oxford University (MPhil)

James J. Eisenhower (born January 30, 1958) is an American lawyer and judge from the Commonwealth of Pennsylvania. He is a judge on the Pennsylvania First Judicial District's Court of Common Pleas, Criminal Section. He was elected November 2023. He was previously a Judge of the Pennsylvania Court of Judicial Discipline and served as the President Judge of the Court. Eisenhower was Of Counsel at Philadelphia law firm Dilworth Paxson LLP.

== Education ==
Born in the Olney section of Philadelphia, James attended the Incarnation of Our Lord Parochial School. He graduated from William Tennet Public High School. James earned a B.A. from Temple University and a J.D. degree from Antioch School of Law. He earned a Master of Philosophy from Oxford University where he was a Marshall Scholar.

== Personal life ==
James is married to Nora Dowd Eisenhower. They have two children.

He is a distant relative of former President Dwight D. Eisenhower.

He is an amateur guitar player, and was known to play during campaign events, even playing a guitar solo with Philadelphia indie rock band Cecil B. during a "Jammin' for Jim" rally at University of Pennsylvania.

== Legal career ==
James began his legal career as an Assistant United States Attorney for the Eastern District of Pennsylvania and as a trial attorney for the United States Department of Justice Civil Rights Division.[3]

James was an assistant professor at Temple University School of Law. He taught Jurisprudence, the Philosophy of Law, and US election law. He also served a law clerk for the Honorable J.Sydney Hoffman, Superior Court of Pennsylvania.

== Government career ==
James served as former Pennsylvania Governor Ed Rendell's chief criminal justice advisor during Rendell's 2002 gubernatorial election. After Rendell's election, Eisenhower served on the "Governor's Cabinet for Children and Families" within the Pennsylvania Department of Public Welfare. From 1994 to 1997 he served as Chief Counsel of the Police Advisory Commission of Philadelphia.

In 2005, Rendell named him Chairman of the Pennsylvania Intergovernmental Cooperation Authority, the inter-governmental body that regulates finances for the city of Philadelphia. During the governorship of Rendell, James also chaired the Pennsylvania Commission on Crime and Delinquency (PCCD), the commonwealth's lead agency for criminal justice, children delinquency prevention and the protection of victims of crime.

In 2019, Governor Tom Wolf appointed James to the Pennsylvania Court of Judicial Discipline. He was President Judge of the eight member Court from 2022–2023.

== Political career ==
In May 2011, he was named to the Board of Directors for Congreso, a Philadelphia-based and nationally recognized multi-service organization. Congreso's goal is to alleviate poverty and promote economic self-sufficiency to ensure that our most vulnerable populations have the educational credentials and workforce skills to compete in a global economy.

In 2008, James was surrogate speaker and primary Election Day counsel for Hillary Clinton. Later that year, he served as general election federal court counsel for Barack Obama.

From 2007 through 2011 he served as the chair of the Pennsylvania Intergovernmental Cooperation Authority (PICA), the state authority that oversees the finances of the city of Philadelphia.

James was the Democratic nominee for the 2000 Pennsylvania Attorney General election and the 2004 Pennsylvania Attorney General election. He won the Democratic primary twice against John Morganelli (2000, 2004) and David Barasch (2004). He narrowly lost the 2004 general election to future Pennsylvania Governor Tom Corbett.

In 2003, he was named to the "Power 75" list of politically influential people in Pennsylvania by the Pennsylvania Report.

== Public service ==
James served on the White House staff at the National Security Council during the presidency of Bill Clinton. He authored PDD 42, the presidential decision directive on international crime and the executive order that seized the assets of the Colombian Cali Cartel. He also served as the White House representative on the US delegation to the P-8 Ministerial meeting in Paris, France on international terrorism.

James also served as a legislative assistant to US Congressman Bob Edgar and was a Lyndon Baines Johnson intern for US Congressman Peter H. Kostmayer.

== Awards and recognition ==
- Edward J. McLaughlin Award for Distinguished Service to Victims, Victim/Witness Services of South Philadelphia, 2009
- Eisenhower Fellow, 2002
- White House Fellow, 1995–1996
- Attorney's General's Award, 1993
- Sustained Superior Performance of Duty Award – US Department of Justice, 1992
- Certificate of Commendation for Outstanding Performance in the Activities of the Civil Rights Division, US Department of Justice, 1988
- Honors Recruit – US Department of Justice, 1987
- Marshall Scholar, 1982
- Lyndon Baines Johnson Congressional Internship, 1977

Party political offices Registrar, Oxford University
Preceded by Joe Kohn	Democratic nominee for Attorney General of Pennsylvania; 2000, 2004	Succeeded by John Morganelli
