= D. Michael Fisher =

American judge (born 1944)

Mike Fisher
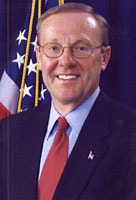

Senior Judge of the United States Court of Appeals for the Third Circuit
- Incumbent
- Assumed office February 1, 2017

Judge of the United States Court of Appeals for the Third Circuit
- In office December 15, 2003 – February 1, 2017
- Appointed by: George W. Bush
- Preceded by: Carol Los Mansmann
- Succeeded by: David Porter

43rd Attorney General of Pennsylvania
- In office January 21, 1997 – December 15, 2003
- Governor: Tom Ridge; Mark Schweiker; Ed Rendell
- Preceded by: Tom Corbett
- Succeeded by: Jerry Pappert

Member of the Pennsylvania Senate from the 37th district
- In office January 6, 1981 – November 30, 1996
- Preceded by: Michael P. Schaefer
- Succeeded by: Tim Murphy

Member of the Pennsylvania House of Representatives from the 40th district
- In office January 7, 1975 – November 19, 1980
- Preceded by: Jay R. Wells
- Succeeded by: Frank Marmion

Personal details
- Born: Dennis Michael Fisher; November 7, 1944 (age 81) Pittsburgh, Pennsylvania, U.S.
- Party: Republican
- Education: Georgetown University (BA, JD)

Dennis Michael Fisher (born November 7, 1944) is a senior United States circuit judge of the United States Court of Appeals for the Third Circuit. He also serves as the Distinguished Jurist in Residence at the University of Pittsburgh School of Law. A former politician, Fisher has served as a state representative, state senator, and as Attorney General of Pennsylvania. He was the Republican nominee for Governor of Pennsylvania in 2002, losing to Ed Rendell.

== Early career and education ==
Fisher began his legal career in his hometown of Pittsburgh following his graduation from Georgetown University with an Artium Baccalaureus degree in 1966 and Georgetown University Law Center with a Juris Doctor in 1969.

As an Assistant District Attorney for Allegheny County, he handled nearly 1,000 cases, including 25 homicides. He continued to practice law during his career in the General Assembly and was a shareholder or partner in various firms, including Houston Harbaugh, where he practiced from 1984 to 1997. Fisher’s law practice included civil litigation, commercial law, estate planning and real estate.

== Political career ==
Before his election as Attorney General, Fisher served for 22 years in the Pennsylvania General Assembly, serving 6 years in the State House and 16 years as a member of the State Senate. He was a member of the House and Senate Judiciary Committees, the Chair of the Senate Environmental Resources and Energy Committee and the Majority Whip of the Senate. During his legislative career, he was a leader in criminal and civil justice reform and an architect of many major environmental laws. He ran unsuccessfully for lieutenant governor in 1986, serving as the running mate of Bill Scranton.

=== Attorney General ===
Prior to becoming a judge, he was elected Attorney General of Pennsylvania in 1996 and re-elected in 2000. Fisher personally argued major cases in state and federal appellate courts. In March 1998, he successfully argued the case of Pa. Bd. of Prob. & Parole v. Scott before the United States Supreme Court, in which the Court held that the Fourth Amendment's exclusionary rule does not apply to parole revocation hearings.

In a 2009 documentary film about the politics behind attempts to move the Barnes Foundation art collection to the Philadelphia Museum of Art called “The Art of the Steal,” Fisher admitted using pressure on Lincoln University officials to get them to approve the move.

=== 2002 gubernatorial election ===
Fisher ran for governor of Pennsylvania in the 2002 election. Early in the campaign, the Republican State Committee gravitated to him as the nominee, much to the chagrin of State Treasurer Barbara Hafer, who had explored a run. After Fisher won the nomination unopposed, Hafer endorsed the Democrat, Ed Rendell and later switched her party affiliation to the Democratic Party. Fisher's campaign website was praised as being among the best during the 2002 Pennsylvania election cycle.

Fisher's candidacy was unable to gain traction, and he was down in the polls by double digits throughout the fall. In the end, Fisher could not catch Rendell and lost 53.4%–44.4%.

== Federal judicial service ==
Fisher was appointed to the United States Court of Appeals for the Third Circuit to serve with Marjorie Rendell, Governor Rendell's wife. Fisher was nominated by President George W. Bush on May 1, 2003, to a seat vacated by Carol Los Mansmann. He was confirmed by the United States Senate on December 9, 2003, and received commission on December 11, 2003. Fisher officially resigned as Attorney General and assumed his judicial office four days later. He assumed senior status on February 1, 2017.

== Personal life ==
Fisher and his wife, Carol, an education consultant, have two adult children. Michelle is an attorney, and Brett works in the Merchant Services Business. He also has 4 grandchildren; Cecilia, Camden, Elliott, and Judge.

Party political offices
| Preceded by William Scranton III | Republican nominee for Lieutenant Governor of Pennsylvania; 1986 | Succeeded by Harold Mowery |
| Preceded by Ernie Preate | Republican nominee for Attorney General of Pennsylvania; 1996, 2000 | Succeeded by Tom Corbett |
| Preceded by Tom Ridge | Republican nominee for Governor of Pennsylvania; 2002 | Succeeded by Lynn Swann |
Legal offices
| Preceded by Tom Corbett | Attorney General of Pennsylvania; 1997–2003 | Succeeded by Jerry Pappert |
| Preceded by Carol Los Mansmann | Judge of the United States Court of Appeals for the Third Circuit; 2003–2017 | Succeeded by David Porter |
