= 2004 Pennsylvania Auditor General election =

- November 2, 2004
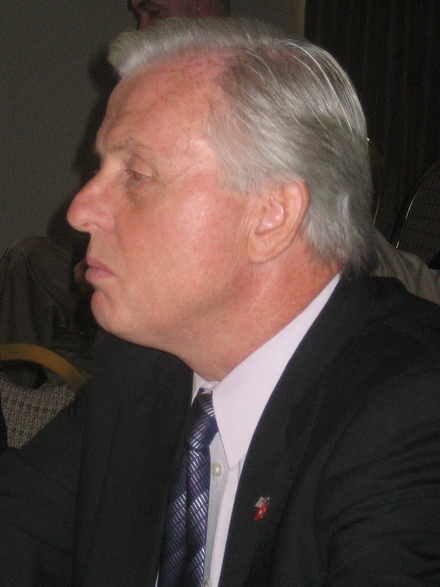

Nominee	Jack Wagner	Joe Peters
Party	Democratic	Republican
Popular vote	2,786,909	2,430,648
Percentage	52.06%	45.41%
- County results Wagner: 40–50% 50–60% 60–70% 80–90% Peters: 40-50% 50-60% 60-70%
Auditor General before election
Bob Casey, Jr.
Democratic
Elected Auditor General
Jack Wagner
Democratic

Pennsylvania's Auditor General election was held November 2, 2004. Necessary primary elections were held on April 27, 2004, with both major party candidates running unopposed. Democrat Jack Wagner, a state senator from Pittsburgh, was elected auditor general; he had previously been the endorsed Democratic candidate for lieutenant governor in 2002, but was upset by Catherine Baker Knoll. The Republican candidate was Joe Peters, a Department of Justice official who was well known for prosecuting Philadelphia mafia boss Nicodemo "Little Nicky" Scarfo.

== General election ==
Pennsylvania Auditor General election, 2004
Party	Candidate	Votes	%
Democratic	Jack Wagner	2,786,909	52.1
Republican	Joe Peters	2,430,648	45.4
Green	Ben Price	53,716	1.0
Libertarian	Berlie Etzel	52,869	1.0
Constitution	Leonard Ritchie	28,776	0.5
Democratic hold			
