= Tom Corbett =

Governor of Pennsylvania from 2011 to 2015

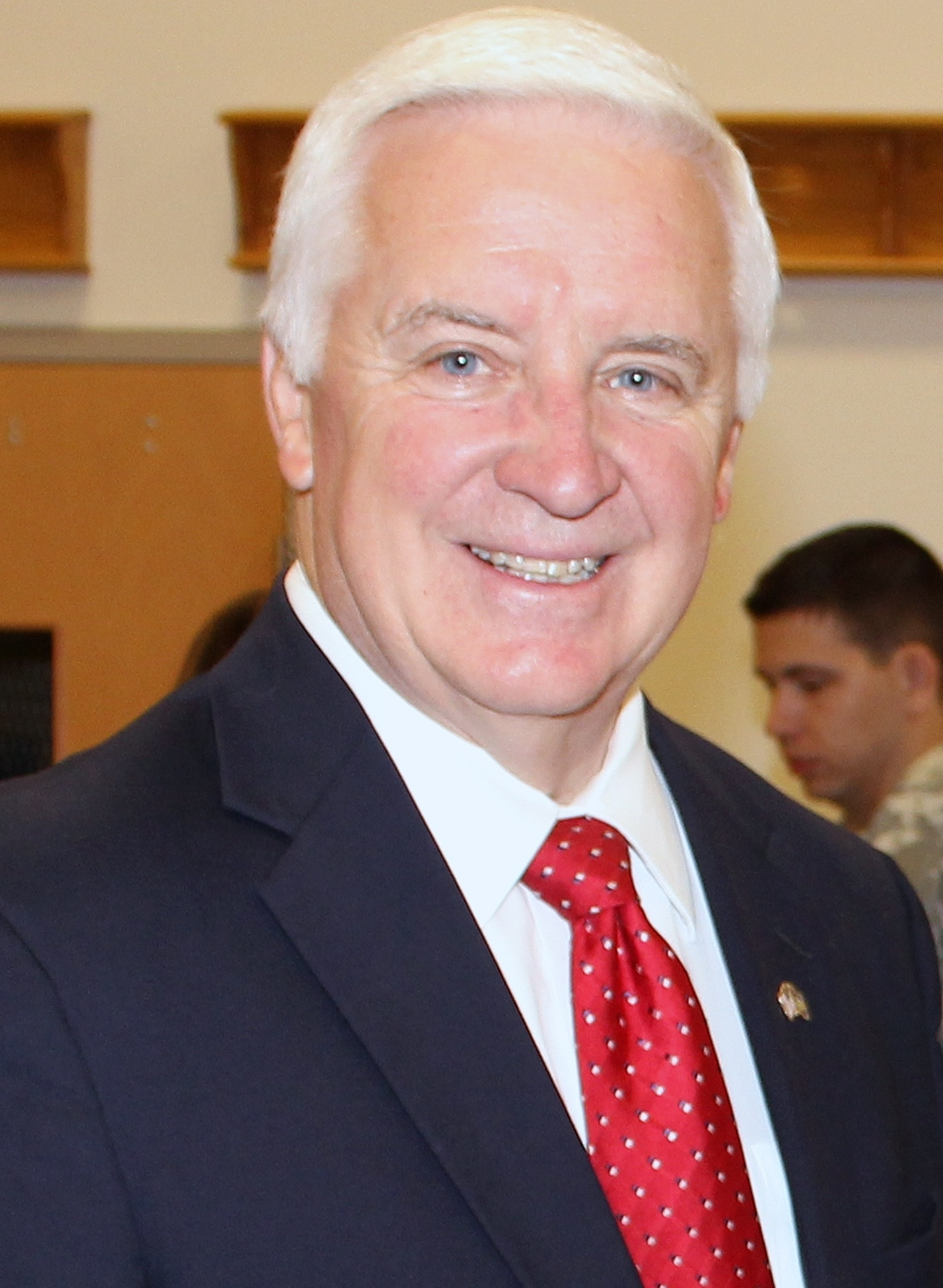
- Corbett in 2014

46th Governor of Pennsylvania
- In office January 18, 2011 – January 20, 2015
- Lieutenant: Jim Cawley
- Preceded by: Ed Rendell
- Succeeded by: Tom Wolf

46th Attorney General of Pennsylvania
- In office January 18, 2005 – January 18, 2011
- Governor: Ed Rendell
- Preceded by: Jerry Pappert
- Succeeded by: William Ryan (acting)
- In office October 3, 1995 – January 22, 1997
- Governor: Tom Ridge
- Preceded by: Ernie Preate
- Succeeded by: Mike Fisher

United States Attorney for the Western District of Pennsylvania
- In office November 30, 1989 – May 1, 1993
- President: George H. W. Bush; Bill Clinton
- Preceded by: Charles Sheehy (acting)
- Succeeded by: Frederick Thieman

Personal details
- Born: Thomas Wingett Corbett Jr. June 17, 1949 (age 77) Philadelphia, Pennsylvania, U.S.
- Party: Republican
- Spouse: Susan Manbeck (m. 1972)
- Children: 2
- Education: Lebanon Valley College (BA); St. Mary's University, Texas (JD)

Military service
- Branch/service: United States Army
- Years of service: 1971–1984
- Rank: Captain
- Unit: 28th Infantry Division; Pennsylvania Army National Guard

Thomas Wingett Corbett Jr. (born June 17, 1949) is an American politician, lobbyist, and former prosecutor who served as the 46th governor of Pennsylvania from 2011 to 2015, and as of 2026 is the most recent Republican to hold that office. Corbett was also the attorney general of Pennsylvania from 1995 to 1997 and again from 2005 to 2011.

Born in Philadelphia, Corbett is a graduate of Lebanon Valley College and St. Mary's University School of Law and served as a captain in the Pennsylvania Army National Guard. Corbett began his career as an assistant district attorney in Allegheny County, Pennsylvania, in 1976. Corbett then joined the U.S. Department of Justice as an assistant U.S. Attorney for the Western District of Pennsylvania, serving from 1980 to 1983, upon entering private practice. In 1988 Corbett was first elected to public office as a Township Commissioner in the Pittsburgh suburb of Shaler, before serving as the United States Attorney for Western Pennsylvania from 1989 to 1993 in the George H. W. Bush administration.

In 1995, Corbett was appointed to fill the remainder of Ernie Preate's term as Attorney General of Pennsylvania, until 1997. Corbett then reentered private practice and worked as the general counsel for Waste Management, Inc before being elected Attorney General of Pennsylvania in 2004. Corbett was then reelected to a second term in 2008, serving a total of two non-consecutive tenures as attorney general from 1995 to 1997, and 2005 to 2011.

Corbett was elected Governor of Pennsylvania in 2010, defeating Democratic nominee Dan Onorato in the general election. He was the second Pennsylvania attorney general to win the state's highest office. Corbett lost his bid for a second term to Democrat Tom Wolf in 2014, marking the first time an incumbent Pennsylvania governor lost their reelection bid since William Bigler in 1854, and the first time in history that a Republican governor lost reelection in Pennsylvania. (Note: In the mid-1800s, governors served three-year terms, and were limited to serving no more than six years of every nine. Beginning with the election of 1874, they were limited to one four-year term. A change to the state constitution in 1968 permitted governors to serve two consecutive four-year terms, then wait at least one term before serving again, with no lifetime limit.) After his defeat, he returned to private life and registered as a lobbyist in 2021.

== Early life, education, and early career ==
Corbett was born in Philadelphia, the son of Mary Bernardine (Diskin) and Thomas W. Corbett. He received his Bachelor's degree at Lebanon Valley College and was employed as a 9th grade teacher for one year at Pine Grove Area School District Corbett then earned his J.D. from St. Mary's University Law School. He served in the Pennsylvania Army National Guard's 28th Infantry Division from 1971 to 1984, rising to the rank of captain.

Corbett's career has been split between private practice and civil service. He began his legal career as an assistant district attorney in Pittsburgh's Allegheny County in 1976. After three and a half years, he was hired in 1980 as an assistant United States Attorney for the Western District of Pennsylvania.

In 1983, Corbett entered private practice as an associate partner at Rose, Schmidt, Hasley & DiSalle. From 1988 and 1989, Corbett won his first election as a township commissioner in the Pittsburgh suburb of Shaler Township.

In 1988, a judge appointed him to monitor the Allegheny County jail while it was under the court's supervision. In 1989, Senators John Heinz and Arlen Specter recommended to President Bush that he nominate Corbett as U.S. Attorney for the Western District of Pennsylvania. Corbett served in the post until May 1993, when he was dismissed by President Bill Clinton.

Corbett then returned to private practice, also serving as an adviser to the gubernatorial campaign of Tom Ridge. Following Ridge's victory, Corbett served on a number of state commissions including the Pennsylvania Commission on Crime and Delinquency, which he served as chairman.

Corbett left office in 1997 and again went into the private sector, first as general counsel for Waste Management, Inc., then opening his own practice.

== Attorney General ==
=== 1995 appointment and tenure ===
In 1995, Corbett was appointed to the position of State Attorney General by Governor Ridge to fill the remainder of the term left by the conviction of Ernie Preate. As a condition of his Senate confirmation, Senate Democrats required him to pledge that he would not run for re-election in 1996. This is a common practice in Pennsylvania for appointments to elected offices. Jerry Pappert made the same pledge in 2003 when he succeeded Mike Fisher as State Attorney General. While Attorney General, Corbett's office received multiple allegations of sexism and derogatory treatment of women. One woman claimed that while working in the office that executives had shared pornographic emails between one another, forcing the office into a $15,000 settlement.

During one of Corbett's first years as Pennsylvania's Attorney General, in September 1996, Corbett and others granted the Lehigh Carbon Community College and the Cedar Crest EmergiCenter full membership of the Drugs Don't Work Here (DDWH) Program. The DDWH Program is a program that assesses substance abuse in the workplace. Three months later in December, Corbett assured that a used-car dealer in Northampton County to pay violations for state laws, in which the dealer, Matthew Connolly, complied to pay the fines.

Corbett considered challenging incumbent Republican U.S. Senator Arlen Specter in the 1998 primary, although he ultimately did not run.

=== 2004 and 2008 elections ===
After early returns were reported, the Associated Press called the race in Democratic nominee Jim Eisenhower's favor, only to retract that call later as the numbers closed. Corbett declared victory the following morning, having defeated Eisenhower by nearly 110,000 votes, winning 50.4 percent to 48.3 percent. Green Party candidate Marakay Rogers captured 1.3 percent of the vote.

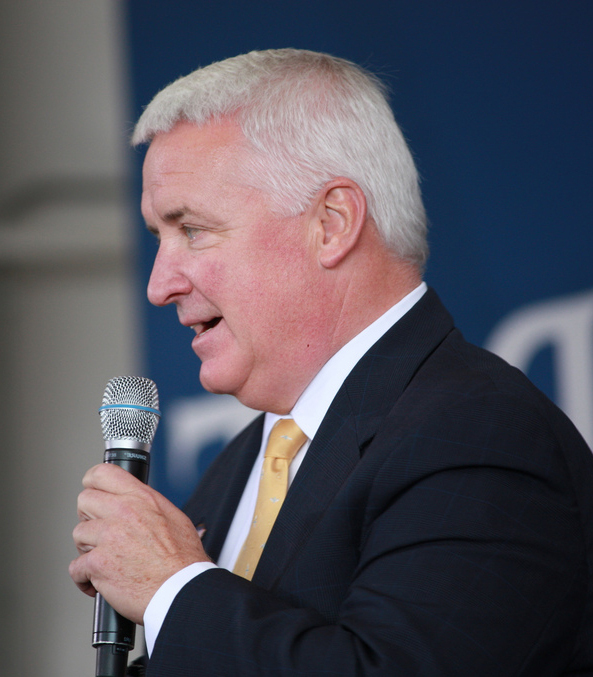
Corbett speaking at a Pittsburgh rally for presidential candidate John McCain in 2008

Corbett was re-elected in 2008. He won with the largest vote total of any Republican in the state's history. He defeated Democrat John Morganelli, bucking the trend of Democratic success in Pennsylvania that year.

=== Tenure ===
In October 2008, Corbett prosecuted four individuals who were part of a $9 million meth ring in Berks and Montgomery County.

Corbett convened a grand jury in 2009 to investigate longstanding allegations of child sexual abuse by former Penn State assistant football coach Jerry Sandusky. The grand jury uncovered evidence of criminal misconduct, and a 40-count indictment against Sandusky was issued in 2011, ultimately leading to Sandusky's criminal conviction in 2012. Corbett has been criticized for the three year time span between the grand jury investigation and Sandusky's indictment, and for his gubernatorial staff approving a $3 million grant to Sandusky's Second Mile charity for children, which, according to the grand jury findings, served as a repository for potential sex-abuse victims.

On March 23, 2010, Corbett, along with 13 other state attorneys general, filed a lawsuit against the mandates in the just-signed federal Healthcare Bill, claiming it is unconstitutional. While Corbett personally believed in the federal Healthcare Bill's unconstitutionality, Corbett said he intended to implement the law once he was Governor of Pennsylvania, according to one spokesperson.

Corbett commented, regarding Dwight Evans (Pennsylvania's House Appropriations Committee), that while Evans had the constitutional right to criticize Corbett as attorney general, it would be a matter of statewide concern if Evans were to cut funding due to a legal position taken [by Corbett as Attorney General]. As of January 2011, a total of 27 states have joined this lawsuit.

In 2010, Corbett subpoenaed the social media app, Twitter, in order to "testify and give evidence regarding alleged violations of the laws of Pennsylvania". Corbett ordered Twitter to give information about two Twitter accounts that had been anonymously criticizing him. One of them was responsible for "exposing the hypocrisy of Tom Corbett". Had Twitter failed to appear in court with the information regarding the accounts, Corbett would hold the company accountable and also issue an arrest warrant for the Twitter representative for contempt of court.

== 2010 gubernatorial campaign ==
Results of the 2010 gubernatorial election by county

On March 17, 2009, it was reported that Corbett had formed an exploratory committee and had begun filing the paperwork necessary to begin a run for Governor of Pennsylvania. On September 15, 2009, Corbett formally declared his candidacy. He faced State Representative Sam Rohrer in the May 18, 2010, Republican primary and defeated him with nearly 70% of the vote. In the general election, he faced Allegheny County Chief Executive Dan Onorato, who won the Democratic primary with 45% of the vote.

In May 2010 Corbett filed a criminal subpoena against Twitter ordering them to divulge "any and all subscriber information" of the person(s) behind two accounts that were criticizing the Republican candidate. Corbett's office denied that the subpoenas were related to the criticism, but rather to an ongoing grand jury investigation. Corbett's office ultimately withdrew the subpoenas.

In July 2010, Corbett garnered attention for suggesting that some of the unemployed are exploiting the extension of unemployment benefits prior to seeking employment, and later noted the prevalence of "help wanted" ads in the newspapers as evidence of the availability of employment.

In September 2010, at the first gubernatorial debate, Corbett again gained attention for seemingly violating his "no-tax pledge" in suggesting that he would consider raising the payroll contribution tax.

On November 2, 2010, Corbett was elected Governor of Pennsylvania, defeating Onorato by 357,975 votes (54% to 46%).

== Governor of Pennsylvania (2011–2015) ==
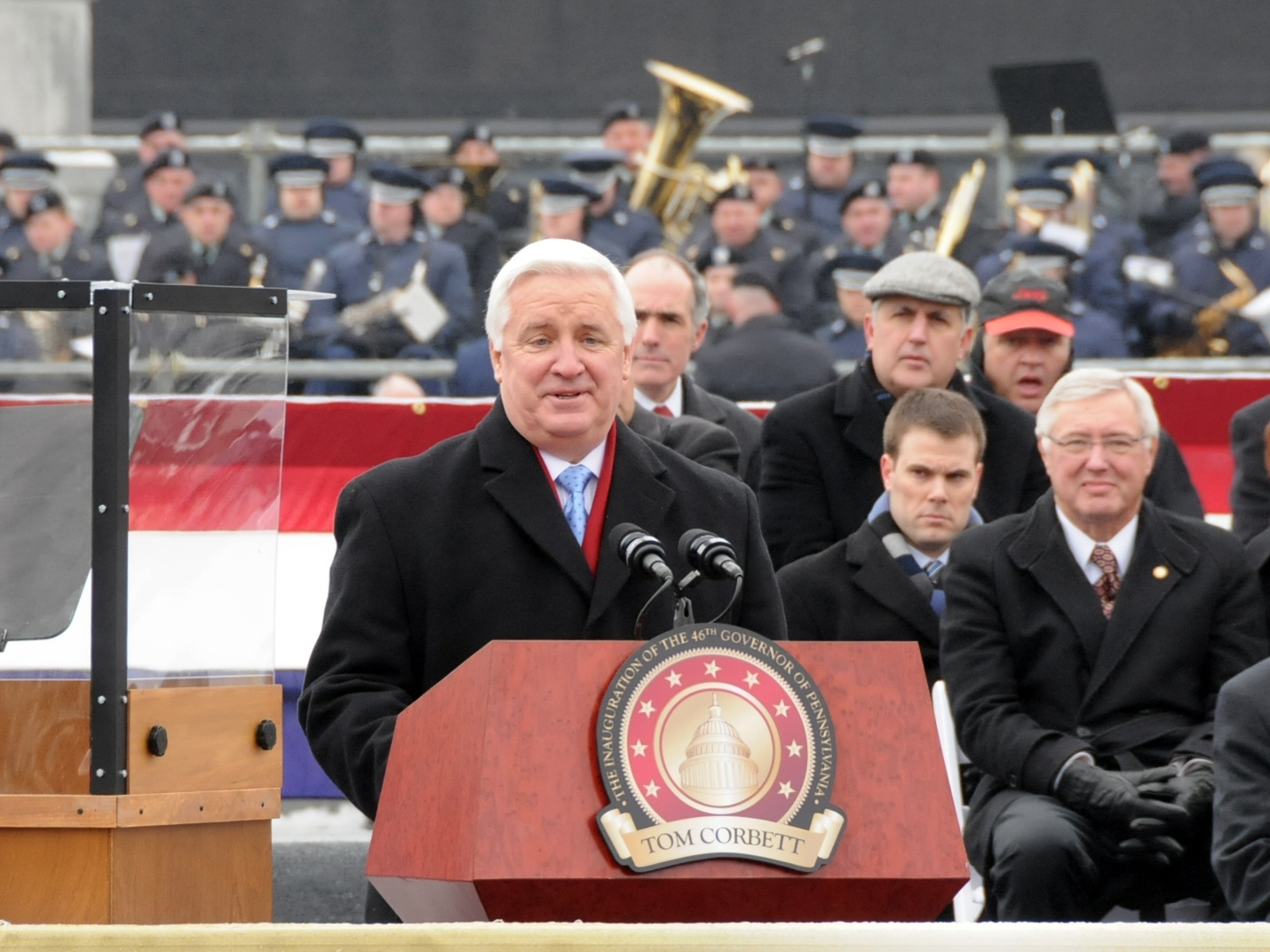
Tom Corbett delivering his inaugural address, January 18, 2011

Corbett assumed the office of governor on January 18, 2011, succeeding term-limited Democrat Ed Rendell. As governor, Corbett maintained a conservative profile; he endorsed Mitt Romney in the 2012 United States presidential election, passed tax cuts, and cut spending.

=== Economy ===
According to data from the federal Bureau of Labor Statistics, between January 2011, when Corbett took office, and June 2014, Pennsylvania gained a net 124,800 jobs during that period. This ranked Pennsylvania 47th in the nation for job creation – ahead of only New Mexico (1 percent), Alaska (1.58 percent) and Arkansas (1.91 percent). Economist Tara Sinclair noted that Pennsylvania suffered fewer job losses during the recession from 2008–2010, so it might be expected to experience a "less robust recovery". In addition, government employment in the state declined 7 percent during Corbett's term.

In 2012, Corbett crafted a proposal for Shell Oil that would give the company tax incentives worth over $1.6 billion over a 25-year period and exempt the company from most state and local taxes if it built a polymer manufacturing plant in Beaver County. Proponents argued that the investment by taxpayers would pay for itself over time by boosting the economy. Shell produced two studies that purported to show economic benefits, but independent researchers found the methodology in the studies to be inadequate.

=== Budget ===
Corbett became governor on January 18, 2011. One of his first actions was the proposal of a new state budget that would decrease spending by 3 percent. The proposed budget received significant criticism due to its cuts in state-supported higher education by 50 percent. Under the new budget, funding granted to the 14 universities of the Pennsylvania State System of Higher Education and state-related universities Penn State, Pittsburgh, Temple, and Lincoln would be cut in half, totaling $625 million. However, Corbett pledged not to attempt to limit collective bargaining, unlike fellow Rust Belt Republican Governors John Kasich of Ohio and Scott Walker of Wisconsin.

Corbett's 2013–14 budget included a $90 million increase to basic education, as well as increases to programs that help people with mental and physical disabilities.

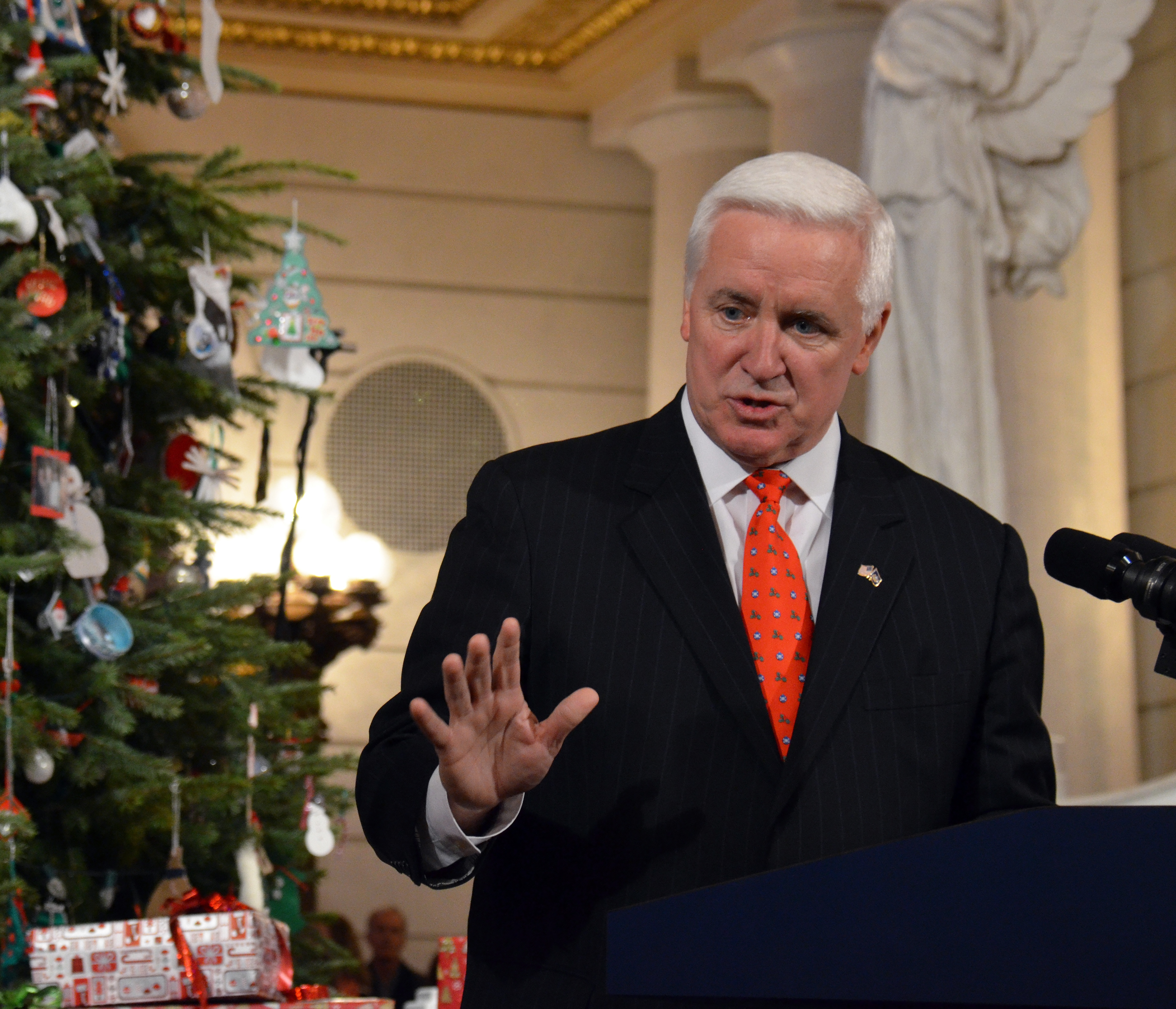
Governor Corbett at the lighting of the State Capitol Christmas tree.

=== Public opinion ===
Polling reflected that most Pennsylvanians disapproved of Governor Corbett's job performance, including his decision to privatize the Pennsylvania Lottery, but supported Corbett's desire to sell off state-owned liquor stores and fix Pennsylvania's ailing transportation system. Governor Corbett and his wife were criticized for accepting gifts as reported in the Philadelphia Daily News. Some politicians have claimed that the governor violated the code of conduct of his office.

An August 2011 poll by the Quinnipiac University Polling Institute found that the governor's statewide approval rating was 44 percent. In October, after the state's response to Tropical Storm Lee, another Quinnipiac poll found that Corbett's approval rating was 50 percent, up six points from August.

In 2013, Franklin & Marshall College commented on the fact that Corbett was the least-popular governor in their poll's 18-year history. Their August 2013 poll found that only 17 percent of voters thought Corbett was doing an "excellent" or "good" job, only 20 percent thought he deserved to be re-elected and 62 percent said the state was "off on the wrong track". In November 2013, Public Policy Polling announced that Corbett was the most unpopular governor in the country, with 65 percent of registered voters and 51 percent of registered Republicans disapproving of his job performance.

=== Natural gas ===
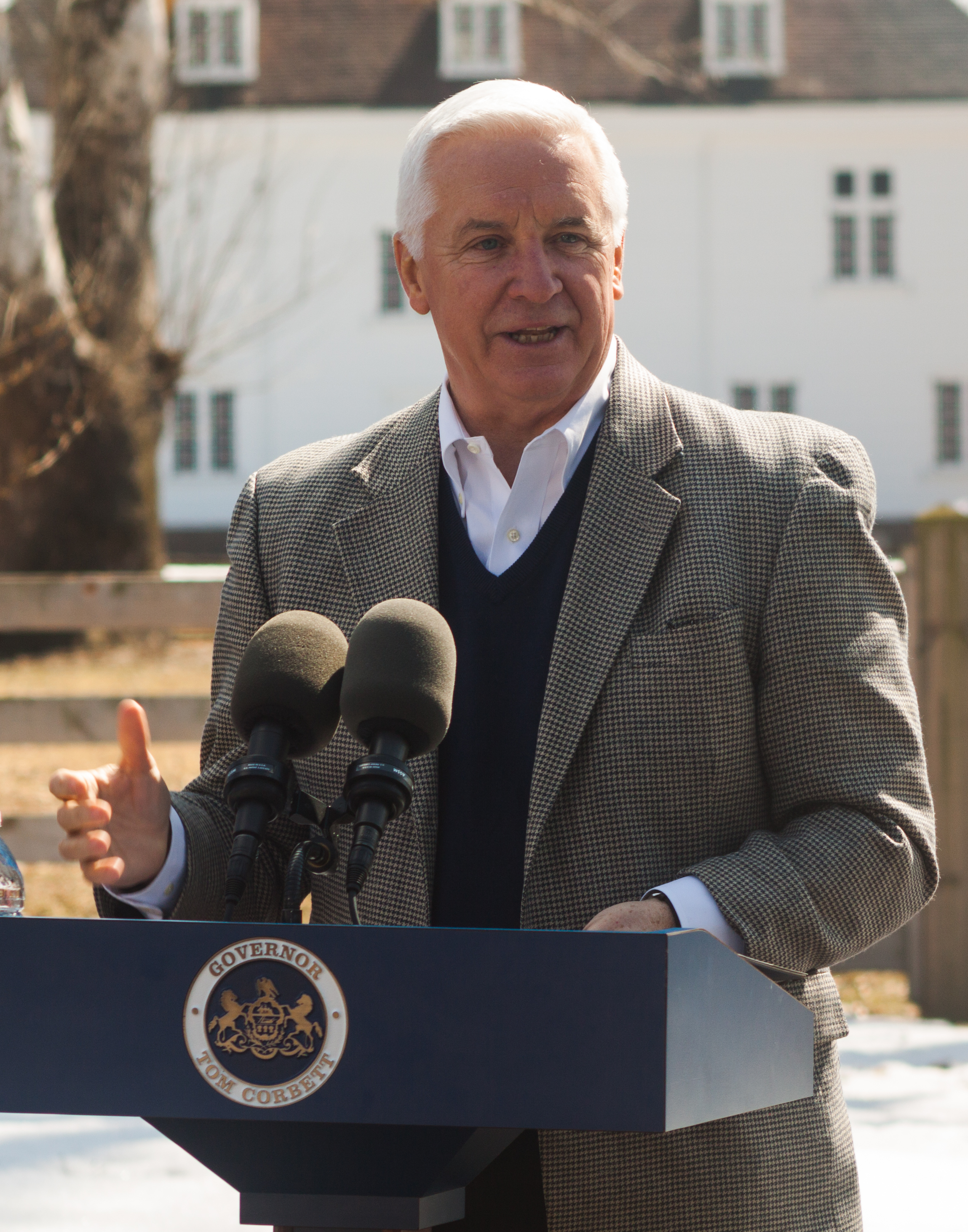
Governor Corbett gives a speech in March 2014

Corbett maintained that Pennsylvania should not institute a natural gas extraction tax, due to its already high corporate net income tax. In February 2011, Corbett repealed a four-month-old policy regulating natural gas drilling (including hydraulic fracturing) in park land, deeming it "unnecessary and redundant" according to a spokesperson. The Pennsylvania Democratic Party called the repeal a "payoff" to oil and gas interests which donated a million dollars to Corbett's campaign. According to Corbett, "had they not given me a dime, I would still be in this position, saying we need to grow jobs in Pennsylvania".

On February 17, 2012, Corbett signed The Marcellus Shale Law (House Bill 1950). The law subjected natural gas drillers to an impact fee to offset any environmental or community impacts of drilling. In 2012, the law generated over $200 million for Pennsylvania municipalities, much less than the estimated amount of an extraction tax.

The law also changed the zoning laws applicable to Marcellus Shale well drilling, more commonly known as hydraulic fracturing: It required that all municipalities must allow Marcellus Shale well drilling in all zoning districts, including residential and municipalities may not limit hours of operation. It also required that water and wastewater pits must also be allowed in all zoning districts, including residential, compressor stations must be allowed in industrial and agricultural zoning districts, and that towns could not limit hours of operation. Gas processing plants were mandated to be allowed in industrial zoning districts, and their hours of operation could not be limited. Gas pipelines were also mandated to be allowed in all zoning districts, including residential.

The law helped gain access to land for new pipelines, one of which transports natural gas from Pennsylvania to export terminals in Maryland, from which it was shipped to Europe and Asia. Critics argued that the pipeline's purpose was to transport the gas to Maryland and D.C. markets. There were also concerns that exporting natural gas would result in more jobs going overseas, leading to increased unemployment in Pennsylvania and other states as gas prices rise globally.

The Marcellus Shale Law (House Bill 1950) also contained a provision that allowed doctors in Pennsylvania access to the list of chemicals in hydraulic fracturing fluid in emergency situations only, but forbade them from discussing this information with their patients. The information could only be used for emergency medical treatment, and doctors were required to immediately verbally agree to keep the information confidential and later sign a document to that effect. The bill also reduced the legal responsibility of vendors, service providers, and operators regarding the identity and impact of contents of the hydraulic fracturing fluid they use.

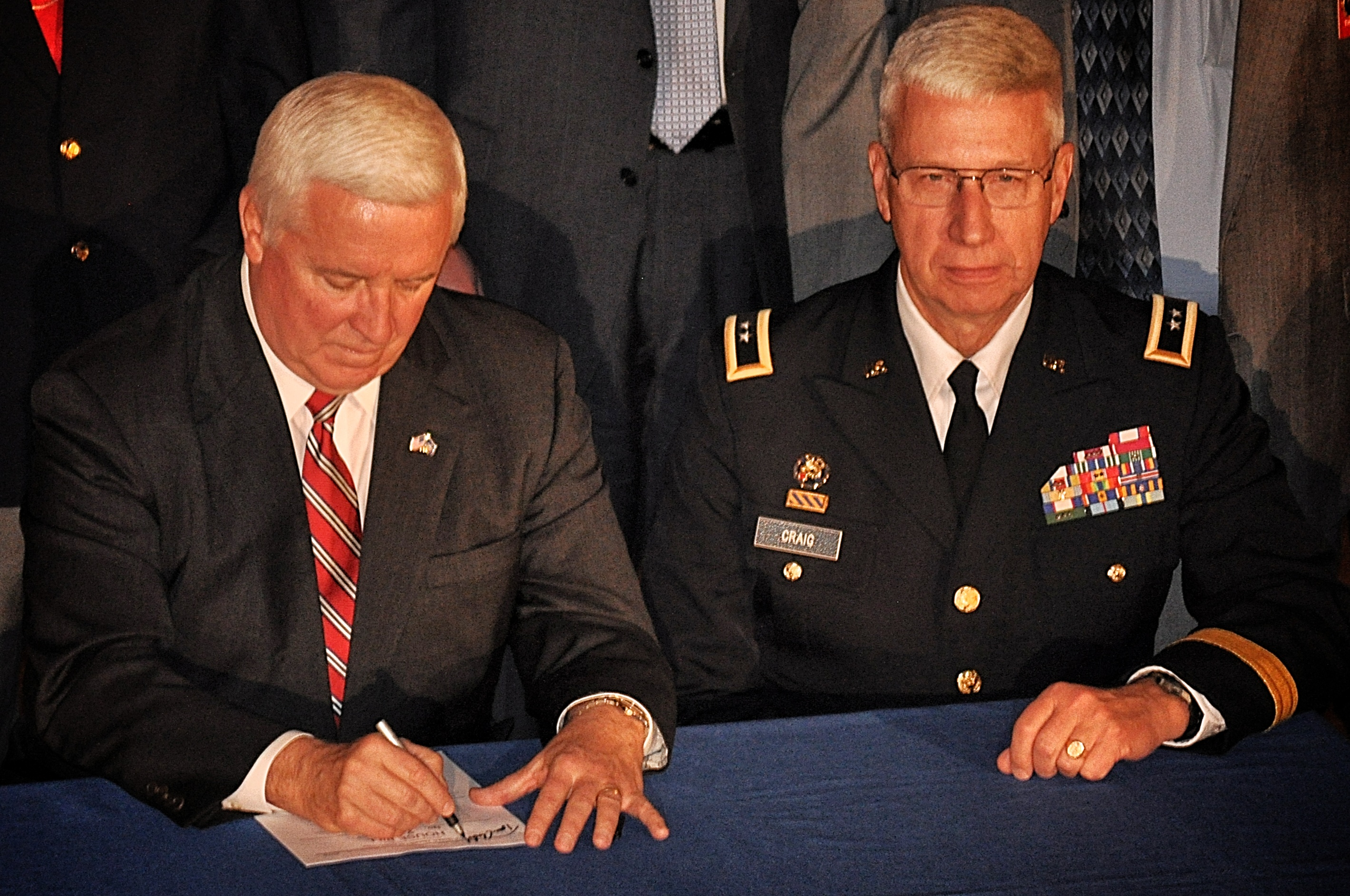
Corbett signing bills into law designed to benefit PA veterans, alongside Major General Wesley Craig.

=== Gay marriage/incest remark ===
In an interview broadcast on October 4, 2013, Corbett was on WHP-TV in Harrisburg when an anchor asked a question regarding a member of his staff comparing the union of gay couples to that of 12-year-old children. Corbett replied: "It was an inappropriate analogy, you know... I think a much better analogy would have been brother and sister, don't you?"

Corbett later issued a statement saying his "words were not intended to offend anyone" and apologizing if they did. His office said the interview was taped Monday. "I explained that current Pennsylvania statute delineates categories of individuals unable to obtain a marriage license," he said. "As an example, I cited siblings as one such category, which is clearly defined in state law. My intent was to provide an example of these categories." He said the legal status of same-sex marriage will be decided with "respect and compassion shown to all sides." A federal judge struck down Pennsylvania's ban on same-sex marriage on May 20, 2014.

=== Other issues ===
On January 30, 2013, Corbett unveiled his plan to privatize Pennsylvania's state-run wine and spirits stores. Corbett estimated the sale of retail and wholesale licenses would raise an estimated $800 million to $1 billion. His administration pledged to use this money for an educational block grant used toward school safety, enhanced early education programs, individualized learning and science, technology, engineering and mathematics courses and programs.

Corbett was against both the decriminalization of cannabis for recreational use and the legalization of medical cannabis. He stated that cannabis was a "gateway drug that creates all of the drug problems we see in the United States."

=== 2014 gubernatorial campaign ===
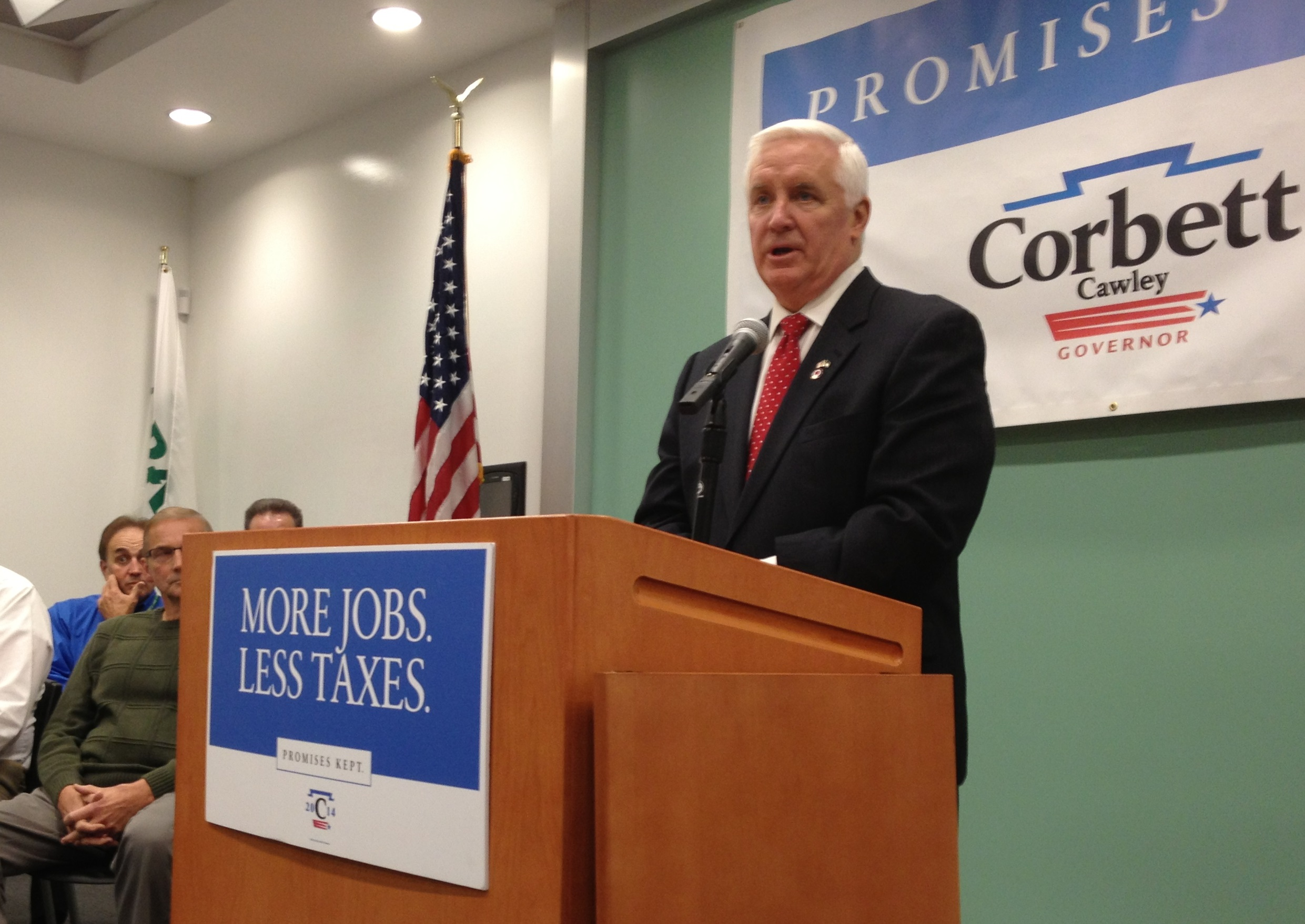
Corbett in November 2013 during his reelection campaign tour

Corbett formally announced his candidacy for reelection on November 8, 2013.

Corbett was considered vulnerable, as reflected in his low approval ratings. An August 2013 Franklin & Marshall College poll found that only 17 percent of voters thought Corbett was doing an "excellent" or "good" job, only 20 percent thought he deserved to be reelected, and 62 percent said the state was "off on the wrong track". Politico called Corbett the most vulnerable incumbent governor in the United States, The Washington Post ranked the election as the most likely for a party switch, and the majority of election forecasters rated it "likely Democratic".

Despite Corbett's unpopularity and speculation that he would face a primary challenge, he was unopposed in the Republican primary. Attorney and conservative activist Bob Guzzardi announced a run against Corbett, however the state Supreme Court ordered Guzzardi's name struck from the ballot due to his failure to file a statement of financial interest, leaving Corbett unopposed for the Republican nomination.

In the general election, Corbett faced Democratic nominee Tom Wolf, a businessman and former Secretary of the Pennsylvania Department of Revenue. Polling indicated a very difficult path to reelection for Corbett; he had trailed Wolf in every single poll taken since March 2013. RealClearPolitics reported an average lead of 10.8 percent for Wolf. HuffPost Pollster's model estimated that Corbett would lose to Wolf 54.2 percent to 36.8 percent and reported that the probability of Wolf beating Corbett was 99 percent.

On November 4, 2014, Corbett lost to Wolf in the general election. by 344,844 votes (55% to 45%). Under the 1968 constitution, he is the first incumbent governor to lose a bid for re-election. Out of 19 Republican governors, Corbett and Alaska's Sean Parnell were the only governors who lost their positions during the 2014 election cycle.

== Post-gubernatorial career ==
After his term expired on January 20, 2015, Corbett returned to private life. He registered as a lobbyist in October 2021. He is currently the Distinguished Executive in Residence at the Thomas R. Kline School of Law of Duquesne University.

== Personal life ==
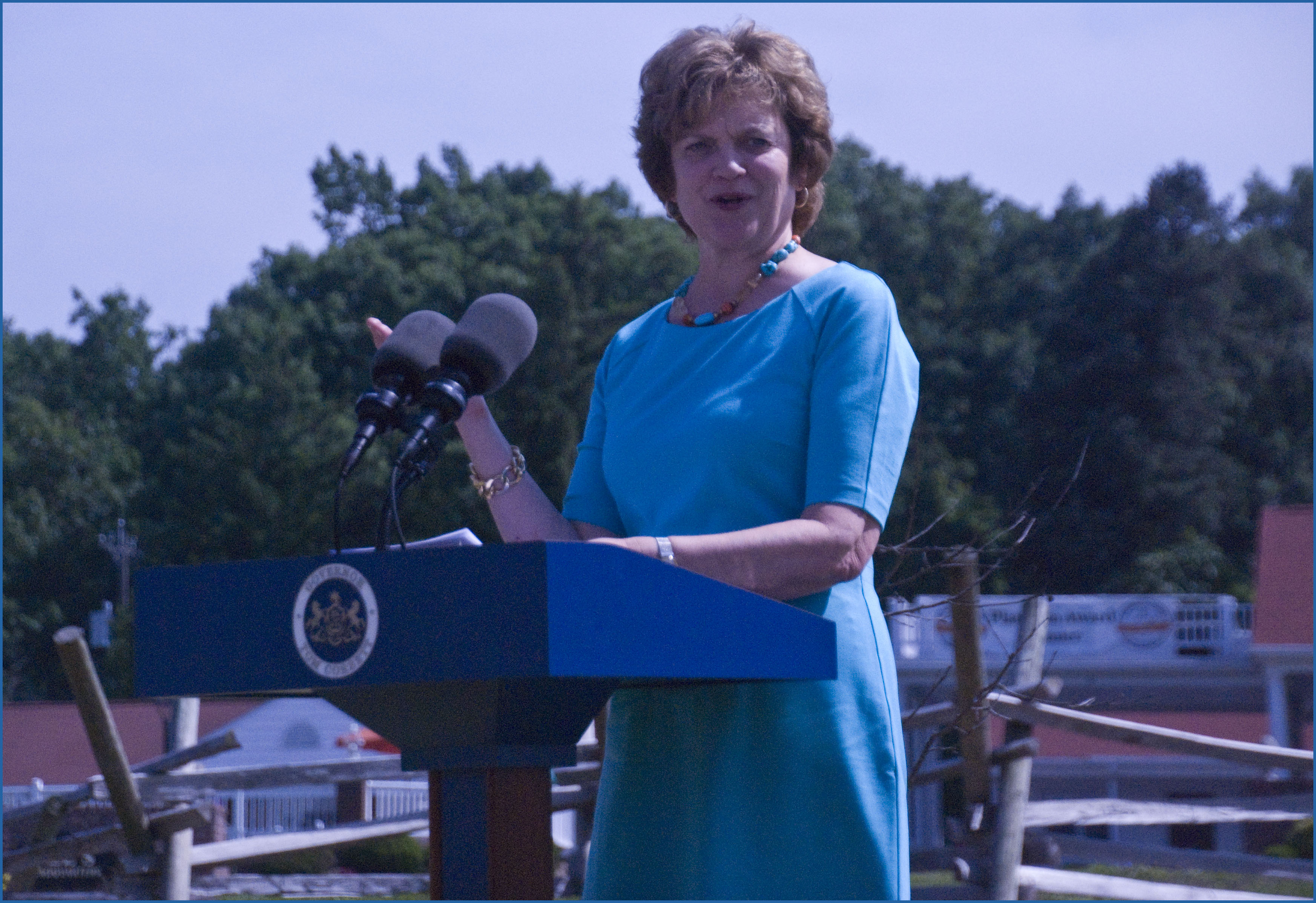
Susan Corbett, First Lady of Pennsylvania from 2011 to 2015.

Corbett married Susan Manbeck Corbett in 1972. The couple met as students at Lebanon Valley College in Annville. Mrs. Corbett has worked as a teacher and a legal secretary. Lately, her career has been in arts administration: as special projects manager for the President's Office at Carnegie Museums and the Director's Office of Carnegie Library of Pittsburgh. She served as Assistant Producer and then Executive Director of Pittsburgh Arts and Lectures and Vice-President for Programs and Development for the Gettysburg Foundation.

Corbett and his wife, Susan, have two children, Tom and Katherine.

== Electoral history ==
2004 Pennsylvania Attorney General election
Party	Candidate	Votes	%
Republican	Tom Corbett	2,730,718	50.4
Democratic	Jim Eisenhower	2,621,927	48.3
Green	Marakay J. Rogers	70,624	1.3

2008 Pennsylvania Attorney General election
Party	Candidate	Votes	%
Republican	Tom Corbett (incumbent)	3,002,927	52.36
Democratic	John Morganelli	2,619,791	45.84
Libertarian	Marakay J. Rogers	109,856	1.89

2010 Pennsylvania gubernatorial election
Party	Candidate	Votes	%
Republican	Tom Corbett	2,172,763	54.5
Democratic	Dan Onorato	1,814,788	45.5
Total votes		3,987,551	100.0

2014 Pennsylvania gubernatorial election
Party	Candidate	Votes	%
Democratic	Tom Wolf	1,920,355	54.93
Republican	Tom Corbett (Incumbent)	1,575,511	45.07
Total votes		3,495,866	100
Democratic gain from Republican			

== Notes ==
Legal offices
Preceded by Charles Sheehy; Acting	United States Attorney for the Western District of Pennsylvania; 1989–1993	Succeeded by Frederick Thieman
Preceded by Ernie Preate	Attorney General of Pennsylvania; 1995–1997	Succeeded by Michael Fisher
Preceded by Jerry Pappert	Attorney General of Pennsylvania; 2005–2011	Succeeded by William Ryan; Acting
Party political offices
Preceded by Mike Fisher	Republican nominee for Attorney General of Pennsylvania; 2004, 2008	Succeeded by David Freed
Preceded by Lynn Swann	Republican nominee for Governor of Pennsylvania; 2010, 2014	Succeeded by Scott Wagner
Political offices
Preceded by Ed Rendell	Governor of Pennsylvania; 2011–2015	Succeeded by Tom Wolf
U.S. order of precedence (ceremonial)
Preceded by Ed Rendell as Former Governor	Order of precedence of the United States	Succeeded by Tom Wolf as Former Governor
