= 2014 Pennsylvania gubernatorial election =

- November 4, 2014
- Turnout: 36.1%(▼5.6%)
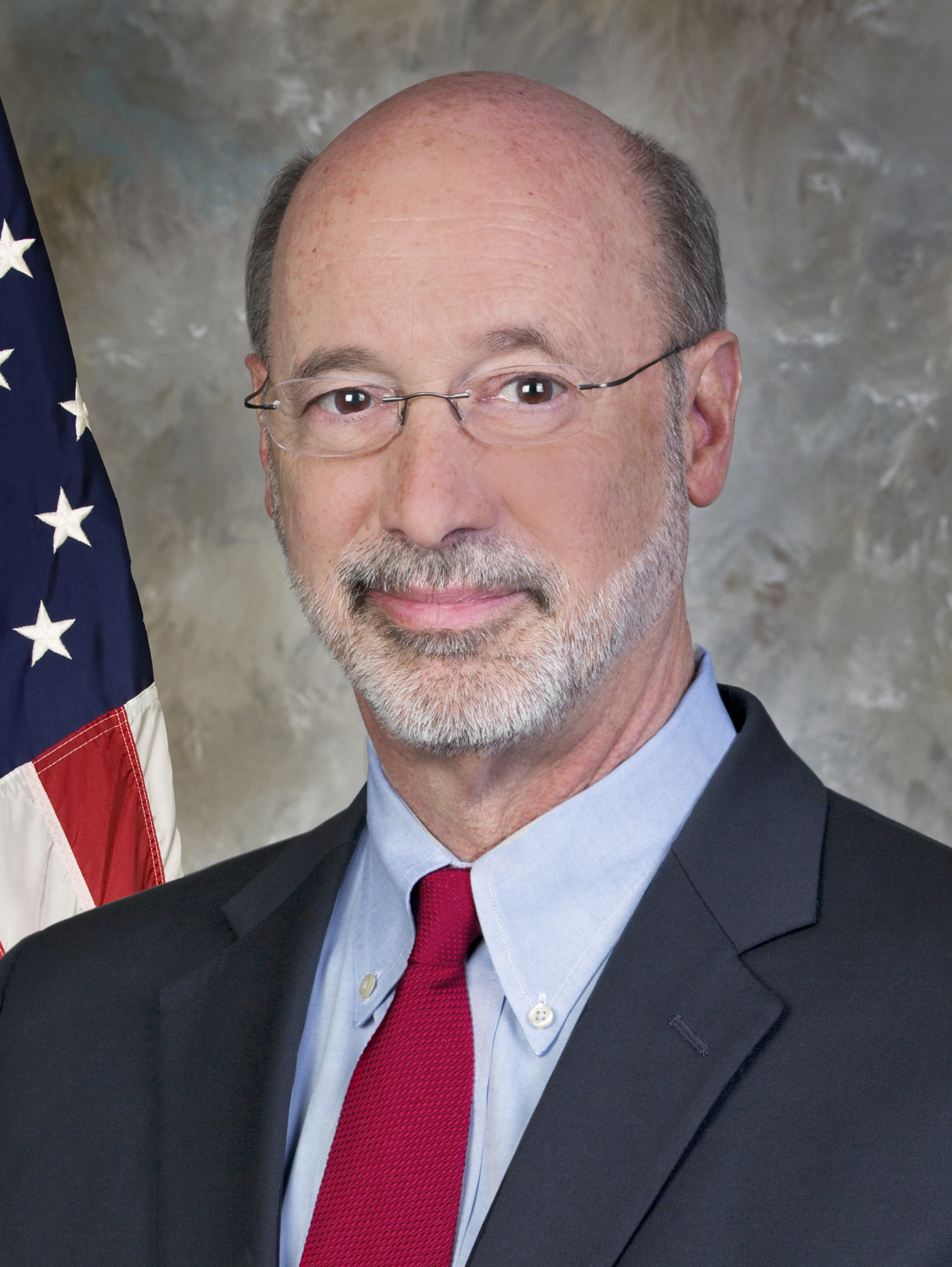

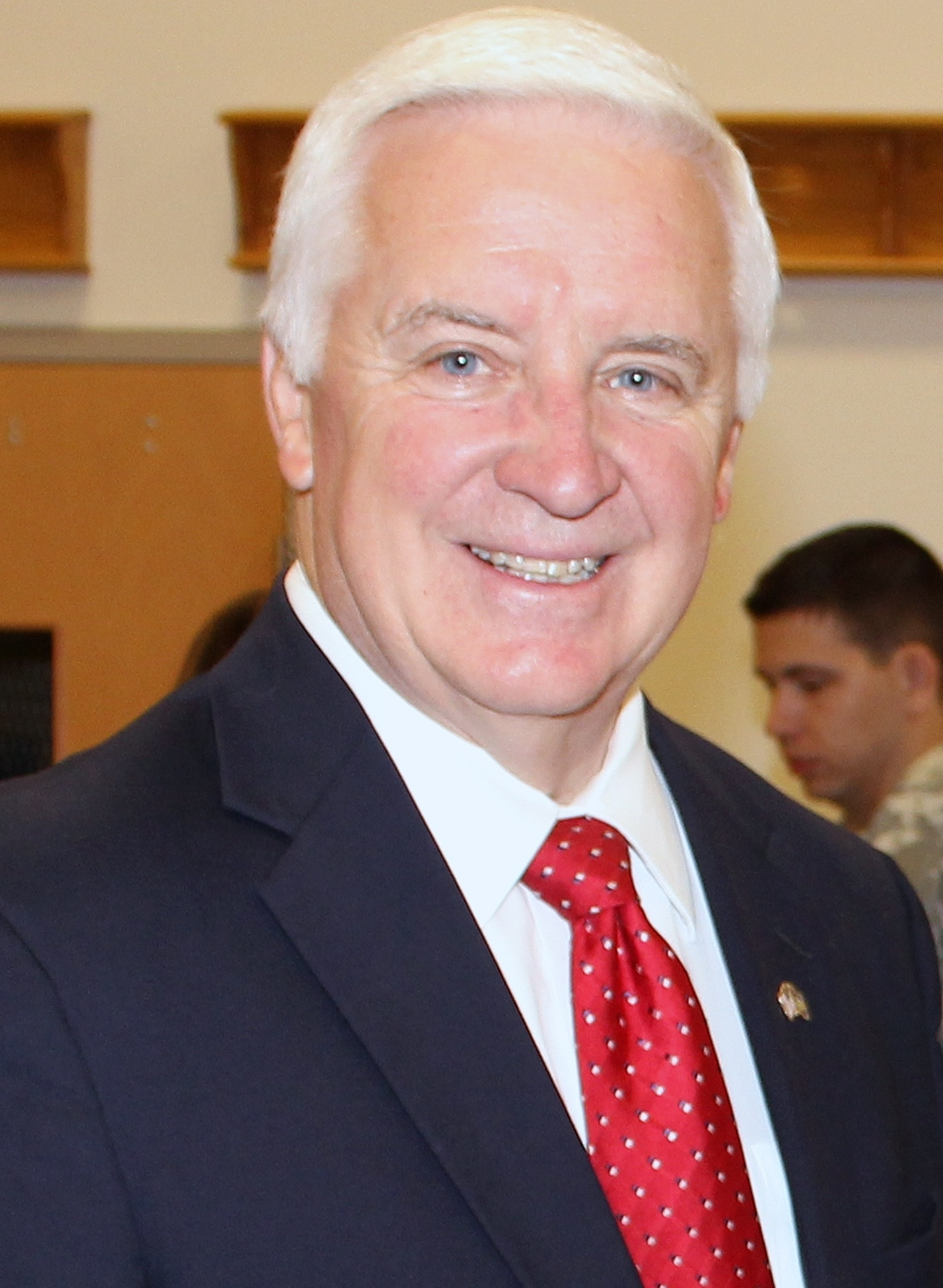
Nominee	Tom Wolf	Tom Corbett
Party	Democratic	Republican
Running mate	Mike Stack	Jim Cawley
Popular vote	1,920,355	1,575,511
Percentage	54.93%	45.07%
- Wolf: 50–60% 60–70% 70–80% 80–90% >90% Corbett: 50–60% 60–70% 70–80% 80–90% >90% Tie: 50% No data
Governor before election
Tom Corbett
Republican
Elected Governor
Tom Wolf
Democratic

The 2014 Pennsylvania gubernatorial election was held on November 4, 2014, to elect the governor and lieutenant governor of Pennsylvania, concurrently with elections to the United States Senate in other states and elections to the United States House of Representatives and various state and local elections.

Incumbent Governor Tom Corbett was defeated by Tom Wolf. This was the only governorship Democrats flipped in the 2014 midterms. Wolf was sworn in on January 20, 2015, marking the most recent time the Pennsylvania governor's office changed partisan control. This was one of nine Republican-held governorships up for election in a state that Barack Obama won in the 2012 presidential election. As of 2025, this is the only Pennsylvania gubernatorial election since 1854 where the incumbent was defeated, (Note: In the mid-1800s, governors served three-year terms, and were limited to serving no more than six years of every nine. Beginning with the election of 1874, they were limited to one four-year term. A change to the state constitution in 1968 permitted governors to serve two consecutive four-year terms, then wait at least one term before serving again, with no lifetime limit.) and the last Pennsylvania gubernatorial election where Cumberland County voted Republican. Dauphin County voted Democratic in a gubernatorial election for the first time since 1990.

Corbett was considered vulnerable, as reflected in his low approval ratings. An August 2013 Franklin & Marshall College poll found that only 17% of voters thought Corbett was doing an "excellent" or "good" job, only 20% thought he deserved to be reelected, and 62% said the state was "off on the wrong track". Politico called Corbett the most vulnerable incumbent governor in the country, The Washington Post ranked the election as the most likely for a party switch, and the majority of election forecasters rated it "likely Democratic".

Wolf in 2014 managed to outperform Barack Obama and Bob Casey Jr.’s performances in the 2012 presidential and U.S. Senate races, respectively. He also won 20 counties that Corbett won in 2010: Erie, Lawrence, Beaver, Allegheny, Greene, Fayette, Cambria, Centre, Clinton, Northumberland, Dauphin, Luzerne, Monroe, Northampton, Carbon, Schuylkill, Lehigh, Berks, Bucks, and Chester. Meanwhile, this is the last time these counties have voted Democratic in a statewide election: Lawrence, Greene, Fayette, Cambria, Clinton, Northumberland, Carbon, and Schuylkill.

This is the first Pennsylvania gubernatorial election since 1982 in which the winner was of the same party as the incumbent president, and the first time since 1934 this occurred during a Democratic administration. This also remains the last time that a Pennsylvania gubernatorial election has been decided by a single-digit margin, as Democrats have won each subsequent election with more than 56% of the vote. 2014 is also the most recent election where Pennsylvania voted for a gubernatorial candidate of a different party from fellow Rust Belt states Michigan and Wisconsin.

== Background ==
Democrats and Republicans have alternated in the governorship of Pennsylvania every eight years from 1950 to 2010. This has been referred to as "the cycle", but it was broken with a Democratic Party win in 2014. Pennsylvania has also voted against the party of the sitting president in 18 of the last 19 gubernatorial contests dating back to 1938; Democrats lost 16 of the previous 17 Pennsylvania gubernatorial races with a Democratic president in the White House, a pattern begun in 1860. The last incumbent governor to be defeated for re-election was Democrat William Bigler in 1854. Until 1968, governors could only serve one term; the state constitution now allows governors to serve two consecutive terms. Libertarian nominee Ken Krawchuk failed to file the paperwork to be on the ballot in time and was excluded from the election as a result.

== Republican primary ==
Incumbent Tom Corbett filed to run, as did Bob Guzzardi, an attorney and conservative activist. However, Guzzardi failed to file a statement of financial interests as required by law, after being told by an employee of the State Department that it was unnecessary. Four Republicans, backed by the state Republican Party, sued to have him removed from the race. The case reached the state Supreme Court, which ordered that Guzzardi's name be struck from the ballot. NASCAR Camping World Truck Series veteran Norm Benning backed Governor Corbett during the later half of the NASCAR season with "Re-Elect Tom Corbett" posted on his truck.

=== Candidates ===
==== Declared ====
- Tom Corbett, incumbent governor of Pennsylvania

==== Disqualified ====
- Bob Guzzardi, attorney, businessman and conservative activist

==== Declined ====
- Bruce Castor, Montgomery County Commissioner
- Jim Gerlach, U.S. Representative and candidate for governor in 2010
- Tom Smith, businessman and nominee for the U.S. Senate in 2012
- Pat Toomey, U.S. Senator

=== Endorsements ===
Tom Corbett

Elected officials

- Jim Cawley, Lieutenant Governor of Pennsylvania
- Jim Christiana, Pennsylvania state representative from the 15th District
- Chris Christie, Governor of New Jersey and Chairman of the Republican Governors Association
- Hal English, Pennsylvania state representative from the 30th District
- Mike Kelly, U.S. Representative of Pennsylvania's 3rd congressional district
- Tim Murphy, U.S. Representative of Pennsylvania's 18th congressional district
- Sandra Schultz Newman, former and first female Justice of the Supreme Court of Pennsylvania
- Rick Perry, Governor of Texas and former candidate for U.S. President in 2012
- Tom Ridge, former Governor of Pennsylvania
- Rick Santorum, former U.S. Senator of Pennsylvania and former candidate for U.S. President in 2012
- Mark Schweiker, former Governor of Pennsylvania
- John J. Taylor, Pennsylvania state representative from the 177th District
- Glenn Thompson, U.S. Representative of Pennsylvania's 5th congressional district
- Dick Thornburgh, former Governor of Pennsylvania
- Pat Toomey, U.S. Senator of Pennsylvania
- Mike Turzai, Pennsylvania House Majority Leader from the 28th District
- Randy Vulakovich, Pennsylvania state senator from the 40th District
- Kim Ward, Pennsylvania state senator from the 39th District

Individuals

- David L. Cohen, Executive Vice-President of Comcast Corporation and Democratic fundraiser/donor
- Robert Gleason, Chairman of the Republican Party of Pennsylvania
- Arnold Palmer, professional golfer
- Michael Reagan, son of President Ronald Reagan

Others

- National Right to Life Committee
- Republican Governors Association
- Republican State Committee of Pennsylvania

=== Polling ===
Hypothetical polling

Poll source	Date(s) administered	Sample size	Margin of error	Tom Corbett	Bob Guzzardi	Undecided
Gravis Marketing	January 22, 2014	956	± ?	42%	23%	35%

Poll source	Date(s) administered	Sample size	Margin of error	Tom Corbett	Someone else	Undecided
Gravis Marketing	January 22, 2014	956	± ?	38%	41%	22%
Public Policy Polling	November 22–25, 2013	491	± 4.4%	42%	47%	11%
Public Policy Polling	March 8–10, 2013	373	± 5.1%	37%	49%	13%
Public Policy Polling	January 4–6, 2013	490	± 6%	45%	37%	17%

Poll source	Date(s) administered	Sample size	Margin of error	Tom Corbett	Bruce Castor	Jim Gerlach	Mike Kelly	Tom Smith	Undecided
Public Policy Polling	November 22–25, 2013	491	± 4.4%	42%	—	31%	—	—	26%
Public Policy Polling	November 22–25, 2013	491	± 4.4%	42%	—	—	31%	—	27%
Public Policy Polling	March 8–10, 2013	373	± 5.1%	43%	23%	—	—	—	35%
Public Policy Polling	March 8–10, 2013	373	± 5.1%	37%	—	—	—	33%	30%
Harper Polling	February 27–28, 2013		±	49.04%	21.07%	—	—	—	29.89%
Public Policy Polling	January 4–6, 2013	490	± 6%	51%	11%	—	—	—	38%

=== Results ===
Republican primary results
Party	Candidate	Votes	%
Republican	Tom Corbett (incumbent)	Unopposed	
Total votes		373,465	100.00%

== Democratic primary ==
=== Candidates ===
==== Declared ====
- Rob McCord, Pennsylvania Treasurer
- Katie McGinty, former secretary of the Pennsylvania Department of Environmental Protection
- Allyson Schwartz, U.S. Representative
- Tom Wolf, businessman and former secretary of the Pennsylvania Department of Revenue

==== Withdrew ====
- John Hanger, former Secretary of the Pennsylvania Department of Environmental Protection
- Jo Ellen Litz, Lebanon County Commissioner (failed to qualify)
- Max Myers, businessman and former pastor
- Ed Pawlowski, Mayor of Allentown
- Jack Wagner, former Pennsylvania Auditor General, candidate for governor in 2010 and candidate for Mayor of Pittsburgh in 2013

==== Declined ====
- Bob Casey Jr., U.S. Senator
- Scott Conklin, state representative and nominee for lieutenant governor in 2010
- Kathy Dahlkemper, former U.S. Representative
- Eugene DePasquale, Pennsylvania Auditor General
- Kathleen Kane, Pennsylvania Attorney General
- Tom Knox, businessman, candidate for Mayor of Philadelphia in 2007 and candidate for governor in 2010
- Daylin Leach, state senator (running for Congress)
- Patrick Murphy, former U.S. Representative
- Michael Nutter, Mayor of Philadelphia
- Ed Rendell, former governor
- Joe Sestak, former U.S. Representative and nominee for the U.S. Senate in 2010
- Josh Shapiro, chairman of the Montgomery County Board of Commissioners
- Tim Solobay, state senator
- Michael J. Stack III, state senator (running for lieutenant governor)

=== Endorsements ===
Robert McCord

Individuals

- Bryan Barbin, state representative
- Ryan Bizzarro, state representative
- John Blake, state senator
- Michael B. Carroll, state representative
- John Cordisco, former state representative and Bucks County Democratic Committee chairman
- Dom Costa, state representative
- Florindo Fabrizio, state representative
- Jaret Gibbons, state representative
- Neal Goodman, state representative
- Joseph Gurzenda, former state senator
- Kevin Haggerty, state representative
- Ted Harhai, state representative
- Sid Michaels Kavulich, state representative
- Deberah Kula, state representative
- Jennifer Mann, former state representative
- Joe Markosek, state representative
- Robert Matzie, state representative
- Ed Pawlowski, Mayor of Allentown
- Chris Sainato, state representative
- Tim Seip, former state representative
- Pam Snyder, state representative
- Tim Solobay, state senator
- Sean Wiley, state senator
- John Wozniak, state senator
- John Yudichak, state senator

Organizations

- American Federation of State, County and Municipal Employees Council 13
- Bakery, Confectionery, Tobacco Workers and Grain Millers Local 464
- International Brotherhood of Electrical Workers Local 5
- International Union of Operating Engineers Local 66
- National Union of Hospital and Health Care Employees District 1199c
- Pennsylvania Conference of Teamsters
- Pennsylvania State Education Association
- United Food and Commercial Workers Local 1776
Kathleen McGinty

Individuals

- Lester R. Brown, founder and President of the Earth Policy Institute
- Carol Browner, former EPA Administrator and former director of the White House Office of Energy and Climate Change Policy
- Peter Daley, state representative
- Anthony M. DeLuca, state representative
- Kathryn S. Fuller, former president and CEO of the World Wildlife Foundation
- Al Gore, former Vice President of the United States
- Patty Kim, state representative
- Jonathan Lash, former president of the World Resources Institute
- Carl Pope, former executive director of the Sierra Club
- Bill Richardson, former Governor of New Mexico
- Robert Rubin, former United States Secretary of the Treasury

Organizations

- Amalgamated Transit Union Local 85
Allyson Schwartz

Individuals

- Bob Brady, U.S. Representative
- Jay Costa, state senator
- Maggie Hassan, Governor of New Hampshire
- Brian Sims, state representative and former president of Equality Pennsylvania

Organizations

- EMILY's List
- International Brotherhood of Electrical Workers Local 98
- Pennsylvania Association of Staff Nurses and Allied Professionals
- Pennsylvania State Council of Sheet Metal Workers
- Pittsburgh Federation of Teachers
- Planned Parenthood Pennsylvania PAC
- United Mine Workers of America
- United Steelworkers Local 10-1
Tom Wolf

Individuals

- Jim Brewster, state senator
- Frank Burns, state representative
- Andy Dinniman, state senator
- Patrick Dougherty, Indiana County district attorney
- Michael F. Doyle, U.S. Representative
- Dwight E. Evans, state representative
- Jim Ferlo, state senator
- Mike Finnerty, Pittsburgh city councilman
- Marty Flynn, state representative
- Rich Fitzgerald, Allegheny County Executive
- Wayne D. Fontana, state senator
- Edward Gainey, state representative
- Rick Gray, Mayor of Lancaster
- John Hanger, former Secretary of the Pennsylvania Department of Environmental Protection
- Vincent Hughes, state senator
- Ron Klink, former U.S. Representative
- Bill Kortz, state representative
- Eddie Day Pashinski, state representative
- Bill Peduto, mayor of Pittsburgh
- Josh Shapiro, chairman of the Montgomery County Board of Commissioners
- Mark Singel, former lieutenant governor of Pennsylvania
- Matthew H. Smith, state senator
- Mike Sturla, state representative
- Rob Teplitz, state senator
- Jake Wheatley, state representative
- Robin Wiessmann, former state treasurer

Newspapers

- The Patriot-News
- Philadelphia Daily News
- Philadelphia Tribune
- Pittsburgh Post-Gazette
- Pottstown Mercury
- York Daily Record

=== Polling ===
Poll source	Date(s) administered	Sample size	Margin of error	John Hanger	Tom Knox	Jo Ellen Litz	Robert McCord	Kathleen McGinty	Max Myers	Ed Pawl- owski	Allyson Schwartz	Joe Sestak	Tim Solobay	Mike Stack	Jack Wagner	Tom Wolf	Other	Unde- cided
Muhlenberg	May 13–15, 2014	414	±5%	—	—	—	11%	7%	—	—	16%	—	—	—	—	41%	—	25%
Harper	May 12–13, 2014	559	±4.14%	—	—	—	15%	5%	—	—	15%	—	—	—	—	50%	—	16%
F&M College	May 6–12, 2014	530	±4.3%	—	—	—	11%	6%	—	—	19%	—	—	—	—	41%	3%	20%
Muhlenberg	April 28–30, 2014	417	±5%	—	—	—	13%	3%	—	—	14%	—	—	—	—	42%	—	28%
GQR**	Mar. 31–Apr. 3, 2014	600	±?	—	—	—	14%	5%	—	—	12%	—	—	—	—	52%	—	16%
F&M College	March 25–31, 2014	524	±4.3%	—	—	—	8%	6%	—	—	9%	—	—	—	—	40%	6%	31%
Harper	Feb. 22–23, 2014	501	±4.38%	7%	—	—	8%	6%	—	—	14%	—	—	—	7%	40%	—	19%
F&M College	Feb. 18–23, 2014	548	±4.2%	1%	—	—	3%	1%	—	—	9%	—	—	—	—	36%	1%	48%
PPP	Nov. 22–25, 2013	436	±4.7%	8%	—	2%	10%	9%	2%	4%	21%	—	—	—	17%	2%	—	27%
Harper	Nov. 9–10, 2013	649	±3.85%	7%	—	—	12%	15%	—	6%	22%	—	—	—	—	5%	—	34%
GHY^	Aug. 27–29, 2013	506	± 4.4%	—	—	—	6%	6%	—	—	25%	—	—	—	—	6%	—	57%
BSG*	July 16–18, 2013	800	±3.46%	—	—	—	10%	15%	—	—	34%	—	—	—	—	11%	—	30%
Quinnipiac	May 30–Jun. 4, 2013	460	± 4.6%	1%	—	—	4%	5%	1%	1%	18%	—	—	1%	—	2%	1%	63%
Quinnipiac	April 19–24, 2013	547	± 4.2%	0%	—	—	3%	—	—	1%	15%	15%	—	1%	—	3%	2%	60%
GSG	March 9–12, 2013	601	± 4%	1%	—	—	5%	5%	—	3%	18%	15%	3%	1%	—	2%	—	47%
GSG	March 9–12, 2013	601	± 4%	1%	—	—	7%	7%	—	3%	21%	—	3%	2%	—	2%	—	54%
GSG	March 9–12, 2013	601	± 4%	—	—	—	12%	—	—	—	31%	—	—	—	—	7%	—	49%
GQR**	March 2–7, 2013	602	±3.99%	1%	1%	—	7%	3%	—	—	16%	21%	—	2%	—	3%	1%	45%
Harper	Feb. 27–28, 2013	?	±?	0.82%	2.88%	—	7%	—	—	—	18.52%	19.75%	—	—	—	1.23%	—	49.79%

- ** Internal poll for the Tom Wolf campaign
- ^ Internal poll for the Kathleen McGinty campaign
- * Internal poll for the Allyson Schwartz campaign

=== Results ===
Results by county: Wolf—80–90% Wolf—70–80% Wolf—60–70% Wolf—50–60% Wolf—40–50%

Democratic primary results
Party	Candidate	Votes	%
Democratic	Tom Wolf	488,917	57.86%
Democratic	Allyson Schwartz	149,027	17.64%
Democratic	Rob McCord	142,311	16.84%
Democratic	Katie McGinty	64,754	7.66%
Total votes		845,009	100.00%

== General election ==
=== Candidates ===
- Tom Corbett (R), incumbent governor
- Paul Glover (G), activist
- Jonathan D. Jewell (I), Independent
- Ken Krawchuk (L), technology consultant and nominee for governor in 1998 and 2002
- Tom Wolf (D), former secretary of the Pennsylvania Department of Revenue

=== Debates ===
- Complete video of debate, September 22, 2014
- Complete video of debate, October 8, 2014

=== Spending ===
As of mid-October, Wolf had raised $27.6 million and spent $21.1 million while Corbett had raised $20.6 million and spent $19.3 million. The two campaigns had run over 21,000 television ads, costing over $13 million.

=== Predictions ===
Source	Ranking	As of
The Cook Political Report	Likely D (flip)	November 3, 2014
Sabato's Crystal Ball	Safe D (flip)	November 3, 2014
Rothenberg Political Report	Likely D (flip)	November 3, 2014
Real Clear Politics	Likely D (flip)	November 3, 2014

=== Polling ===
Poll source	Date(s) administered	Sample size	Margin of error	Tom Corbett (R)	Tom Wolf (D)	Other	Undecided
Muhlenberg College	October 27–29, 2014	409	± 5%	39%	51%	6%	4%
Magellan Strategies	October 27–28, 2014	1,433	± 2.6%	43%	50%	—	7%
Harper Polling	October 26–27, 2014	680	± 3.76%	40%	50%	—	10%
Franklin & Marshall	October 20–26, 2014	326 LV	± 5.1%	40%	53%	1%	5%
Franklin & Marshall	October 20–26, 2014	738 RV	± 3.4%	37%	53%	1%	9%
CBS News/NYT/YouGov	October 16–23, 2014	3,111	± 3%	39%	52%	0%	8%
Magellan Strategies	October 13–14, 2014	1,131	± 2.9%	42%	49%	—	9%
Quinnipiac University	September 30 – October 5, 2014	907	± 3.3%	38%	55%	2%	5%
CBS News/NYT/YouGov	September 20 – October 1, 2014	3,283	± 2%	41%	50%	0%	9%
Robert Morris University	September 26–29, 2014	500	± 4%	34%	57%	—	9%
Mercyhurst University	September 15–24, 2014	479	± 4.48%	28%	43%	2%	27%
Franklin & Marshall	September 15–22, 2014	231 LV	± 6.4%	37%	57%	2%	5%
Franklin & Marshall	September 15–22, 2014	520 RV	± 4.3%	33%	54%	4%	9%
Magellan Strategies	September 17–18, 2014	1,120	± 2.9%	40%	49%	—	11%
Muhlenberg College	September 16–18, 2014	429	± 5%	33%	54%	4%	9%
Quinnipiac University	September 3–8, 2014	1,161	± 2.9%	35%	59%	2%	4%
Harper Polling	September 2–3, 2014	665	± 3.2%	41%	52%	—	7%
CBS News/NYT/YouGov	August 18 – September 2, 2014	3,560	± 2%	39%	50%	2%	10%
Robert Morris University	August 18–22, 2014	500	± 4.5%	25%	56%	—	20%
Franklin & Marshall	August 18–25, 2014	520	± 4.3%	24%	49%	1%	25%
Magellan Strategies	July 30–31, 2014	1,214	± 2.83%	38%	50%	—	12%
CBS News/NYT/YouGov	July 5–24, 2014	4,150	± ?	39%	52%	2%	7%
Franklin & Marshall	June 23–29, 2014	502	± 4.4%	25%	47%	1%	27%
Quinnipiac University	May 29 – June 2, 2014	1,308	± 2.7%	33%	53%	1%	13%
Public Policy Polling	May 30 – June 1, 2014	835	± 3.4%	30%	55%	—	15%
Rasmussen Reports	May 27–28, 2014	750	± 4%	31%	51%	4%	14%
Quinnipiac University	February 19–24, 2014	1,405	± 2.6%	33%	52%	1%	13%
Gravis Marketing	January 22–23, 2014	717	± 4%	34%	41%	—	24%
Quinnipiac University	December 11–16, 2013	1,061	± 3%	37%	44%	1%	19%
Public Policy Polling	November 22–25, 2013	693	± 3.7%	32%	44%	—	24%
Quinnipiac University	March 6–11, 2013	1,116	± 2.9%	39%	39%	2%	20%
Public Policy Polling	March 8–10, 2013	504	± 4.4%	33%	42%	—	25%
Public Policy Polling	January 4–6, 2013	675	± 3.8%	41%	29%	—	30%

Hypothetical polling

With Corbett

Poll source	Date(s) administered	Sample size	Margin of error	Tom Corbett (R)	John Hanger (D)	Other	Undecided
Quinnipiac University	February 19–24, 2014	1,405	± 2.6%	37%	40%	4%	20%
Quinnipiac University	December 11–16, 2013	1,061	± 3%	42%	37%	2%	19%
Public Policy Polling	November 22–25, 2013	693	± 3.7%	32%	51%	—	16%
Quinnipiac University	March 6–11, 2013	1,116	± 2.9%	42%	41%	2%	15%
Public Policy Polling	March 8–10, 2013	504	± 4.4%	34%	41%	—	25%
Public Policy Polling	January 4–6, 2013	675	± 3.8%	41%	37%	—	21%

Poll source	Date(s) administered	Sample size	Margin of error	Tom Corbett (R)	Kathleen Kane (D)	Other	Undecided
Public Policy Polling	January 4–6, 2013	675	± 3.8%	42%	42%	—	16%

Poll source	Date(s) administered	Sample size	Margin of error	Tom Corbett (R)	Tom Knox (D)	Other	Undecided
Quinnipiac University	March 6–11, 2013	1,116	± 2.9%	40%	39%	1%	19%

Poll source	Date(s) administered	Sample size	Margin of error	Tom Corbett (R)	Robert McCord (D)	Other	Undecided
Quinnipiac University	February 19–24, 2014	1,405	± 2.6%	36%	43%	4%	17%
Gravis Marketing	January 22–23, 2014	717	± 4%	36%	48%	—	16%
Quinnipiac University	December 11–16, 2013	1,061	± 3%	39%	42%	2%	18%
Public Policy Polling	November 22–25, 2013	693	± 3.7%	31%	50%	—	18%
Quinnipiac University	May 30–June 4, 2013	1,032	± 3.1%	35%	43%	1%	20%
Quinnipiac University	April 19–24, 2013	1,235	± 2.8%	35%	44%	1%	20%
Quinnipiac University	March 6–11, 2013	1,116	± 2.9%	42%	38%	1%	19%
Public Policy Polling	March 8–10, 2013	504	± 4.4%	34%	45%	—	21%
Public Policy Polling	January 4–6, 2013	675	± 3.8%	41%	35%	—	24%

Poll source	Date(s) administered	Sample size	Margin of error	Tom Corbett (R)	Kathleen McGinty (D)	Other	Undecided
Quinnipiac University	February 19–24, 2014	1,405	± 2.6%	38%	40%	3%	18%
Quinnipiac University	December 11–16, 2013	1,061	± 3%	37%	44%	1%	18%
Public Policy Polling	November 22–25, 2013	693	± 3.7%	32%	47%	—	21%

Poll source	Date(s) administered	Sample size	Margin of error	Tom Corbett (R)	Michael Nutter (D)	Other	Undecided
Public Policy Polling	January 4–6, 2013	675	± 3.8%	41%	38%	—	21%

Poll source	Date(s) administered	Sample size	Margin of error	Tom Corbett (R)	Ed Pawlowski (D)	Other	Undecided
Quinnipiac University	December 11–16, 2013	1,061	± 3%	39%	41%	2%	18%
Public Policy Polling	November 22–25, 2013	693	± 3.7%	33%	45%	—	22%
Quinnipiac University	March 6–11, 2013	1,116	± 2.9%	38%	44%	2%	16%

Poll source	Date(s) administered	Sample size	Margin of error	Tom Corbett (R)	Ed Rendell (D)	Other	Undecided
Public Policy Polling	January 4–6, 2013	675	± 3.8%	40%	46%	—	14%

Poll source	Date(s) administered	Sample size	Margin of error	Tom Corbett (R)	Allyson Schwartz (D)	Other	Undecided
Quinnipiac University	February 19–24, 2014	1,405	± 2.6%	38%	44%	3%	15%
Gravis Marketing	January 22–23, 2014	717	± 4%	35%	44%	—	21%
Quinnipiac University	December 11–16, 2013	1,061	± 3%	37%	45%	1%	16%
Public Policy Polling	November 22–25, 2013	693	± 3.7%	33%	48%	—	20%
Benenson Strategy Group	August 6–8, 2013	600	± 4%	41%	49%	—	10%
Quinnipiac University	May 30–June 4, 2013	1,032	± 3.1%	35%	45%	1%	19%
Public Opinion Strategies	April 30–May 2, 2013	600	± 4%	34%	46%	—	20%
Quinnipiac University	April 19–24, 2013	1,235	± 2.8%	34%	47%	2%	17%
Quinnipiac University	March 6–11, 2013	1,116	± 2.9%	39%	42%	1%	18%
Public Policy Polling	March 8–10, 2013	504	± 4.4%	34%	45%	—	21%
Benenson Strategy Group	January 15–17, 2013	600	± 4%	42%	50%	—	9%
Public Policy Polling	January 4–6, 2013	675	± 3.8%	41%	34%	—	25%

Poll source	Date(s) administered	Sample size	Margin of error	Tom Corbett (R)	Joe Sestak (D)	Other	Undecided
Quinnipiac University	April 19–24, 2013	1,235	± 2.8%	34%	48%	1%	17%
Quinnipiac University	March 6–11, 2013	1,116	± 2.9%	38%	47%	1%	14%
Public Policy Polling	March 8–10, 2013	504	± 4.4%	34%	45%	—	21%
Public Policy Polling	January 4–6, 2013	675	± 3.8%	42%	36%	—	23%

Poll source	Date(s) administered	Sample size	Margin of error	Tom Corbett (R)	Mike Stack (D)	Other	Undecided
Quinnipiac University	March 6–11, 2013	1,116	± 2.9%	39%	40%	1%	20%

Poll source	Date(s) administered	Sample size	Margin of error	Tom Corbett (R)	Jack Wagner (D)	Other	Undecided
Quinnipiac University	February 19–24, 2014	1,405	± 2.6%	37%	44%	3%	15%
Quinnipiac University	December 11–16, 2013	1,061	± 3%	36%	48%	1%	15%
Public Policy Polling	November 22–25, 2013	693	± 3.7%	30%	50%	—	20%

With Gerlach

Poll source	Date(s) administered	Sample size	Margin of error	Jim Gerlach (R)	Allyson Schwartz (D)	Other	Undecided
Public Policy Polling	November 22–25, 2013	693	± 3.7%	31%	39%	—	29%

With Guzzardi

Poll source	Date(s) administered	Sample size	Margin of error	Bob Guzzardi (R)	Robert McCord (D)	Other	Undecided
Gravis Marketing	January 22–23, 2014	717	± 4%	31%	43%	—	26%

Poll source	Date(s) administered	Sample size	Margin of error	Bob Guzzardi (R)	Allyson Schwartz (D)	Other	Undecided
Gravis Marketing	January 22–23, 2014	717	± 4%	33%	42%	—	25%

Poll source	Date(s) administered	Sample size	Margin of error	Bob Guzzardi (R)	Tom Wolf (D)	Other	Undecided
Gravis Marketing	January 22–23, 2014	717	± 4%	30%	38%	—	31%

With Kelly

Poll source	Date(s) administered	Sample size	Margin of error	Mike Kelly (R)	Allyson Schwartz (D)	Other	Undecided
Public Policy Polling	November 22–25, 2013	693	± 3.7%	33%	41%	—	27%

=== Results ===

2014 Pennsylvania gubernatorial election
Party	Candidate	Votes	%	±%
Democratic	Tom Wolf Mike Stack	1,920,355	54.93%	+9.42%
Republican	Tom Corbett (incumbent) Jim Cawley (incumbent)	1,575,511	45.07%	−9.42%
Total votes		3,495,866	100.00%	N/A
Democratic gain from Republican				

=== Results by county ===
County	Tom Wolf Democratic		Tom Corbett Republican		Margin		Total votes cast
County	#	%	#	%	#	%	Total votes cast
Adams	11,130	39.86%	16,790	60.14%	-5,660	-20.28%	27,920
Allegheny	207,017	58.30%	148,057	41.70%	58,960	16.60%	355,074
Armstrong	7,195	38.45%	11,520	61.55%	-4,325	-23.10%	18,715
Beaver	24,456	51.21%	23,302	48.79%	1,154	2.42%	47,758
Bedford	4,786	34.59%	9,050	65.41%	-4,264	-30.82%	13,836
Berks	51,840	50.90%	50,005	49.10%	1,835	1.80%	101,845
Blair	12,800	41.94%	17,718	58.06%	-4,918	-16.12%	30,518
Bradford	5,082	33.91%	9,905	66.09%	-4,823	-32.18%	14,987
Bucks	103,812	52.33%	94,584	47.67%	9,228	4.66%	198,396
Butler	20,171	36.03%	35,818	63.97%	-15,647	-27.94%	55,989
Cambria	22,021	54.58%	18,325	45.42%	3,696	9.16%	40,346
Cameron	609	43.88%	779	56.12%	-170	-12.24%	1,388
Carbon	9,163	53.81%	7,864	46.19%	1,299	7.62%	17,027
Centre	22,393	57.59%	16,489	42.41%	5,904	15.18%	38,882
Chester	80,701	51.80%	75,097	48.20%	5,604	3.60%	155,798
Clarion	4,371	40.51%	6,418	59.49%	-2,047	-18.98%	10,789
Clearfield	9,682	46.45%	11,161	53.55%	-1,479	-7.10%	20,843
Clinton	4,583	53.84%	3,929	46.16%	654	7.68%	8,512
Columbia	6,572	43.36%	8,585	56.64%	-2,013	-13.28%	15,157
Crawford	9,994	43.05%	13,219	56.95%	-3,225	-13.90%	23,213
Cumberland	31,311	41.78%	43,625	58.22%	-12,314	-16.44%	74,936
Dauphin	40,376	50.80%	39,111	49.20%	1,265	1.60%	79,487
Delaware	110,934	60.91%	71,180	39.09%	39,754	21.82%	182,114
Elk	4,273	48.51%	4,536	51.49%	-263	-2.98%	8,809
Erie	42,115	58.09%	30,389	41.91%	11,726	16.18%	72,504
Fayette	18,102	57.96%	13,129	42.04%	4,973	15.92%	31,231
Forest	815	49.85%	820	50.15%	-5	-0.30%	1,635
Franklin	12,461	32.47%	25,913	67.53%	-13,452	-35.06%	38,374
Fulton	1,111	29.54%	2,650	70.46%	-1,539	-40.92%	3,761
Greene	5,230	56.18%	4,080	43.82%	1,150	12.36%	9,310
Huntingdon	5,500	43.15%	7,247	56.85%	-1,747	-13.70%	12,747
Indiana	10,223	45.59%	12,199	54.41%	-1,976	-8.82%	22,422
Jefferson	4,375	36.97%	7,458	63.03%	-3,083	-26.06%	11,833
Juniata	2,172	32.89%	4,431	67.11%	-2,259	-34.22%	6,603
Lackawanna	41,680	69.74%	18,081	30.26%	23,599	39.48%	59,761
Lancaster	57,594	40.91%	83,179	59.09%	-25,585	-18.18%	140,773
Lawrence	11,996	51.79%	11,166	48.21%	830	3.58%	23,162
Lebanon	13,629	37.48%	22,738	62.52%	-9,109	-25.04%	36,367
Lehigh	44,658	54.76%	36,894	45.24%	7,764	9.52%	81,552
Luzerne	41,609	56.07%	32,605	43.93%	9,004	12.14%	74,214
Lycoming	10,997	35.36%	20,106	64.64%	-9,109	-29.28%	31,103
McKean	2,945	35.67%	5,311	64.33%	-2,366	-28.66%	8,256
Mercer	14,466	48.44%	15,397	51.56%	-931	-3.12%	29,863
Mifflin	3,492	32.30%	7,318	67.70%	-3,826	-35.40%	10,810
Monroe	19,864	56.90%	15,046	43.10%	4,818	13.80%	34,910
Montgomery	156,200	59.86%	104,726	40.14%	51,474	19.72%	260,926
Montour	2,123	42.27%	2,900	57.73%	-777	-15.46%	5,023
Northampton	40,753	54.99%	33,354	45.01%	7,399	9.98%	74,107
Northumberland	10,852	50.43%	10,666	49.57%	186	0.86%	21,518
Perry	4,344	33.36%	8,679	66.64%	-4,335	-33.28%	13,023
Philadelphia	333,539	88.05%	45,268	11.95%	288,271	76.10%	378,807
Pike	5,365	41.53%	7,553	58.47%	-2,188	-16.94%	12,918
Potter	1,524	32.68%	3,140	67.32%	-1,616	-34.64%	4,664
Schuylkill	20,544	54.48%	17,168	45.52%	3,376	8.96%	37,712
Snyder	3,982	40.82%	5,772	59.18%	-1,790	-18.36%	9,754
Somerset	9,599	42.20%	13,150	57.80%	-3,551	-15.60%	22,749
Sullivan	778	36.99%	1,325	63.01%	-547	-26.02%	2,103
Susquehanna	4,300	35.52%	7,805	64.48%	-3,505	-28.96%	12,105
Tioga	3,541	30.87%	7,929	69.13%	-4,388	-38.26%	11,470
Union	4,784	47.15%	5,362	52.85%	-578	-5.70%	10,146
Venango	6,333	44.90%	7,771	55.10%	-1,438	-10.20%	14,104
Warren	4,965	44.49%	6,194	55.51%	-1,229	-11.02%	11,159
Washington	29,058	48.22%	31,203	51.78%	-2,145	-3.56%	60,261
Wayne	6,087	44.40%	7,621	55.60%	-1,534	-11.20%	13,708
Westmoreland	45,501	42.84%	60,716	57.16%	-15,215	-14.32%	106,217
Wyoming	3,491	44.35%	4,381	55.65%	-890	-11.30%	7,872
York	52,386	42.94%	69,604	57.06%	-17,218	-14.12%	121,990
Totals	1,920,355	54.93%	1,575,511	45.07%	344,844	9.86%	3,495,866

==== Counties that flipped from Republican to Democratic ====
- Allegheny (largest city: Pittsburgh)
- Beaver (largest city: Beaver)
- Berks (largest borough: Reading)
- Bucks (largest municipality: Bensalem)
- Cambria (largest municipality: Johnstown)
- Carbon (largest municipality: Lehighton)
- Centre (largest municipality: State College)
- Chester (largest municipality: West Chester)
- Clinton (largest city: Lock Haven)
- Dauphin (largest municipality: Harrisburg)
- Erie (largest municipality: Erie)
- Fayette (largest borough: Uniontown)
- Greene (largest municipality: Waynesburg)
- Lawrence (largest municipality: New Castle)
- Lehigh (largest municipality: Allentown)
- Luzerne (largest municipality: Wilkes-Barre)
- Monroe (largest borough: Stroudsburg)
- Northampton (largest municipality: Bethlehem)
- Northumberland (largest borough: Sunbury)
- Schuylkill (largest city: Pottsville)

==== By congressional district ====
Corbett won ten of 18 congressional districts, despite losing statewide to Wolf. However, at the time, most of the districts were gerrymanders drawn by Republican legislators. Wolf won the 6th, 7th and 8th districts, which all elected Republicans to the House.

District	Corbett	Wolf	Representative
1st	16%	84%	Bob Brady
2nd	8%	92%	Chaka Fattah
3rd	54%	46%	Mike Kelly
4th	56%	44%	Scott Perry
5th	51%	49%	Glenn Thompson
6th	49%	51%	Jim Gerlach
6th	49%	51%	Ryan Costello
7th	48%	52%	Patrick Meehan
8th	48%	52%	Mike Fitzpatrick
9th	55%	45%	Bill Shuster
10th	59%	41%	Tom Marino
11th	53%	47%	Lou Barletta
12th	53%	47%	Keith Rothfus
13th	30%	70%	Brendan Boyle
14th	30%	70%	Mike Doyle
15th	50%	50%	Charlie Dent
16th	54%	46%	Joe Pitts
17th	39%	61%	Matt Cartwright
18th	54%	46%	Tim Murphy

== See also ==
- 2014 Pennsylvania lieutenant gubernatorial election
- 2014 United States gubernatorial elections
- 2014 United States House of Representatives elections in Pennsylvania
