= 2008 Pennsylvania State Treasurer election =

2008 Pennsylvania Treasurer election
- November 4, 2008
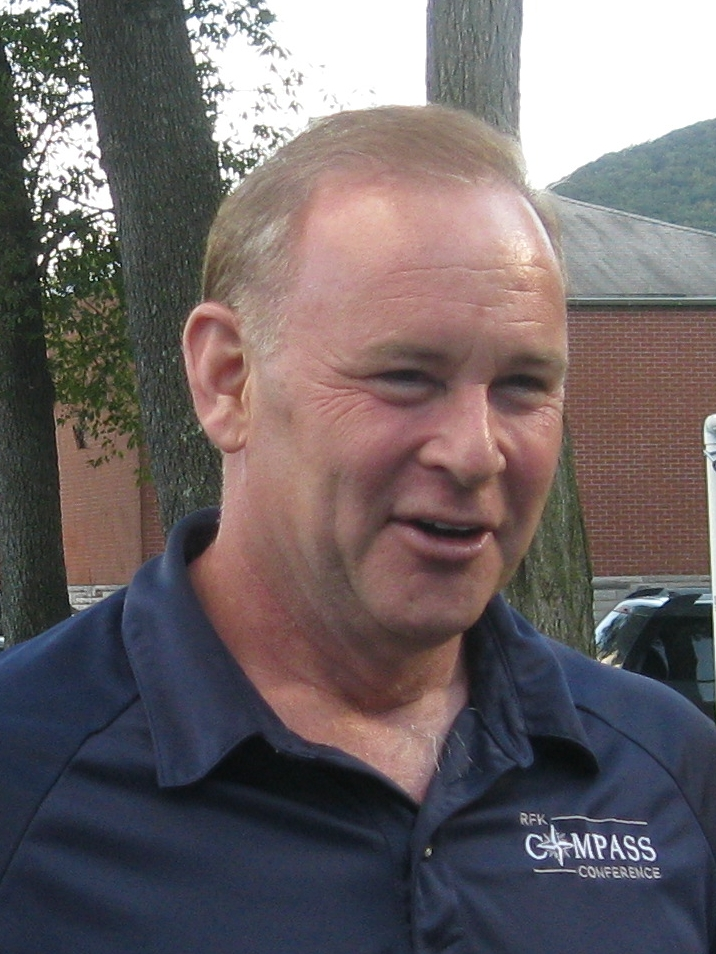

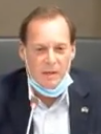
Nominee	Rob McCord	Tom Ellis
Party	Democratic	Republican
Popular vote	3,104,242	2,422,628
Percentage	54.98%	42.90%
- County results McCord: 40–50% 50–60% 60–70% 80–90% Ellis: 50–60% 60–70%
Treasurer before election
Robin Wiessmann
Democratic
Elected Treasurer
Rob McCord
Democratic

Pennsylvania's election for Treasurer was held on November 4, 2008. Democratic incumbent Treasurer Robin Wiessmann had been appointed by Governor Ed Rendell to fill Bob Casey Jr.'s term when he was elected to the U.S. Senate in 2006; Wiessman's appointment included the condition that she would not run for election in 2008.

== Candidates ==
Four candidates sought the Democratic nomination for the office: John Cordisco, an attorney and former State Representative from New Hope; Rob McCord, a venture capitalist from Lower Merion; Dennis Morrison-Wesley, an investment banker from Harrisburg; and Jennifer Mann, a State Representative from Allentown McCord won the primary by a fair margin and faced Tom Ellis in the general election on November 4, 2008; the Republican Ellis, a Montgomery County Commissioner, was unopposed for the nomination.

McCord had no prior record in elected office, but worked at the beginning of his career on Capitol Hill, specializing in "budget and regulatory issues." McCord worked more recently as a financial advisor and venture capitalist; his website claims that, during his career, he managed $1 billion in assets and has indirectly worked to create more than 1,900 jobs in Pennsylvania. McCord's opponents, especially Cordisco, have accused him of a lack of financial transparency and of risking conflicts of interest were he to become Treasurer.

== General election ==
=== Results ===
2008 Pennsylvania Treasurer general election
Party	Candidate	Votes	%	±%
Democratic	Rob McCord	3,104,242	54.98%	−6.28%
Republican	Tom Ellis	2,422,628	42.90%	+6.40%
Libertarian	Berlie Etzel	119,748	2.12%	+1.0%
Majority		681,614	12.08%	
Turnout		5,646,618	100%	
Democratic hold				

== See also ==
- Pennsylvania elections, 2008
