= 2008 Pennsylvania elections =

- November 4, 2008
- Registered: 8,755,588
- Turnout: 68.7%

Elections were held in Pennsylvania on November 4, 2008. Necessary primary elections were held on April 22.

All 203 seats of the Pennsylvania House of Representatives, 25 seats of the Pennsylvania Senate, as well as the offices of Pennsylvania Treasurer, Pennsylvania Auditor General, and Pennsylvania Attorney General were up for election.

== Presidential Primary ==
=== Democratic primary ===
Pennsylvania's Democratic Primary to award the state's 158 pledged delegates took place on April 22, 2008. Senator Barack Obama and Senator Hillary Clinton were the only 2 Democratic candidates on the ballot.

According to official results from the primary, Clinton won 54.6% of the vote, and Obama took the remaining 45.4%.

=== Republican primary ===
John McCain had already secured the majority of delegates for the Republican Party nomination, and captured 73% of Republican votes in the Pennsylvania primary. Republican turn-out was low during the election, possibly due to party registration switching from Republican to Democrat.

== Constitutional officers ==
=== Treasurer ===
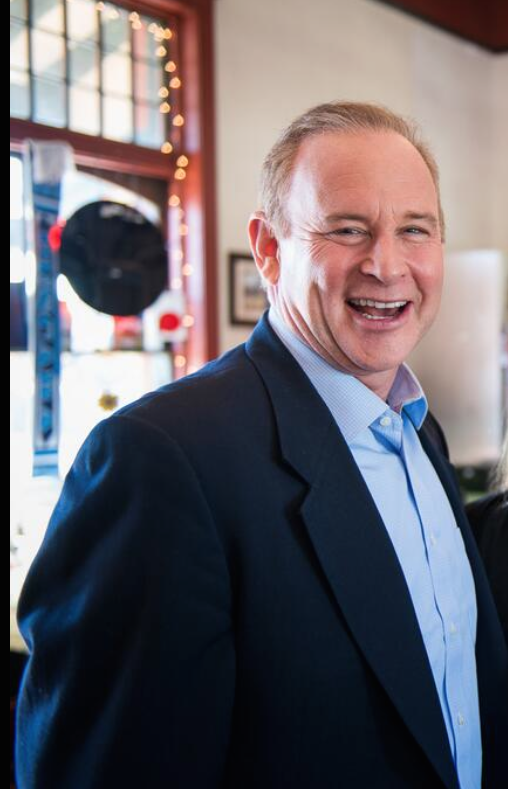
38th State Treasurer Rob McCord

Pennsylvania's election for State Treasurer was held in November 4, after incumbent Treasurer Robin Weissmann announced she would not run in 2008. Two major candidates ran for State Treasurer; Rob McCord, the Democratic nominee from Lower Merion, and Tom Ellis, a Montgomery County Commissioner, and unopposed nominee for the Republican Party. Rob McCord won the election, with 54.98% of the vote.

2008 Pennsylvania Treasurer general election
Party	Candidate	Votes	%	±%
Democratic	Rob McCord	3,104,242	54.98%	−6.28%
Republican	Tom Ellis	2,422,628	42.90%	+6.40%
Libertarian	Berlie Etzel	119,748	2.12%	+1.0%
Majority		681,614	12.08%	
Turnout		5,646,618	100%	
Democratic hold				

=== Attorney General ===
The primaries for Attorney General were held on April 22. This election marked the last time a Republican was elected Attorney General of Pennsylvania until 2024. Incumbent Tom Corbett ran as the unopposed Republican candidate. Democratic candidate John Morganelli also ran unopposed. Former 2006 gubernatorial candidate Marakay Rogers as the Libertarian candidate. Tom Corbett was announced as the winner of the election on November 4.

2008 Pennsylvania Attorney General election
Party	Candidate	Votes	%	±%
Republican	Tom Corbett (incumbent)	3,002,927	52.36	
Democratic	John Morganelli	2,619,791	45.84	
Libertarian	Marakay Rogers	109,856	1.89	
Majority				
Turnout				

=== Auditor General ===
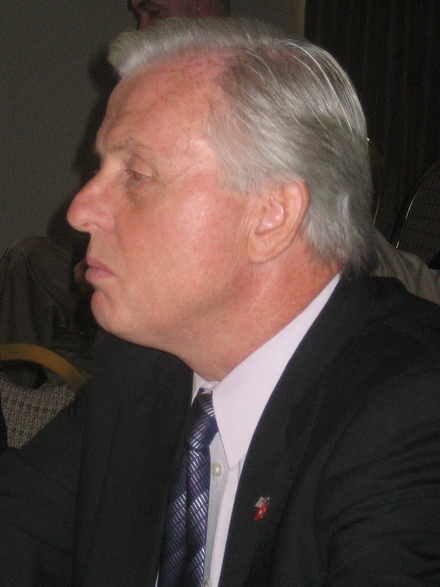
Incumbent Auditor General Jack Wagner

Pennsylvania's election for Auditor General was held on November 8. Incumbent Auditor General Jack Wagner ran unopposed as the Democratic nominee. Manufacturing and construction executive Chet Beiler also ran unopposed as the Republican nominee after opponent Chris Walsh withdrew due to problems with nomination petitions.

2008 Pennsylvania Auditor General election
Party	Candidate	Votes	%	±%
Democratic	Jack Wagner (incumbent)	3,336,219	59.00	▲6.94
Republican	Chet Beiler	2,134,543	37.75	▼7.66
Libertarian	Betsy Summers	184,029	3.25	▲2.26
Majority				
Turnout		5,654,791		
Democratic hold				

== Pennsylvania General Assembly ==
See: Pennsylvania House of Representatives election, 2008 and Pennsylvania State Senate elections, 2008.

== Statewide Ballot Referendums ==
The ballot question asked the voters to authorize the issuance of $400,000,000 in bonds for the "acquisition, repair, construction, reconstruction, rehabilitation, extension, expansion and improvement" of sewage treatment facilities and water supply systems. The money raised would be dispensed by the Pennsylvania Infrastructure Investment Authority. The measure passed with a healthy statewide margin and had a gained a majority in 64 of 67 counties.

Water And Sewer Improvements Bond Referendum
Candidate	Votes	%
Yes	2,804,998	61.6
No	1,748,362	38.4

Referendum results by county Yes: 70–80%; 60–70%; 50–60%; No: 50–60%

== See also ==
- United States House of Representatives elections in Pennsylvania, 2008
