= Richard Vague =

American businessperson and author

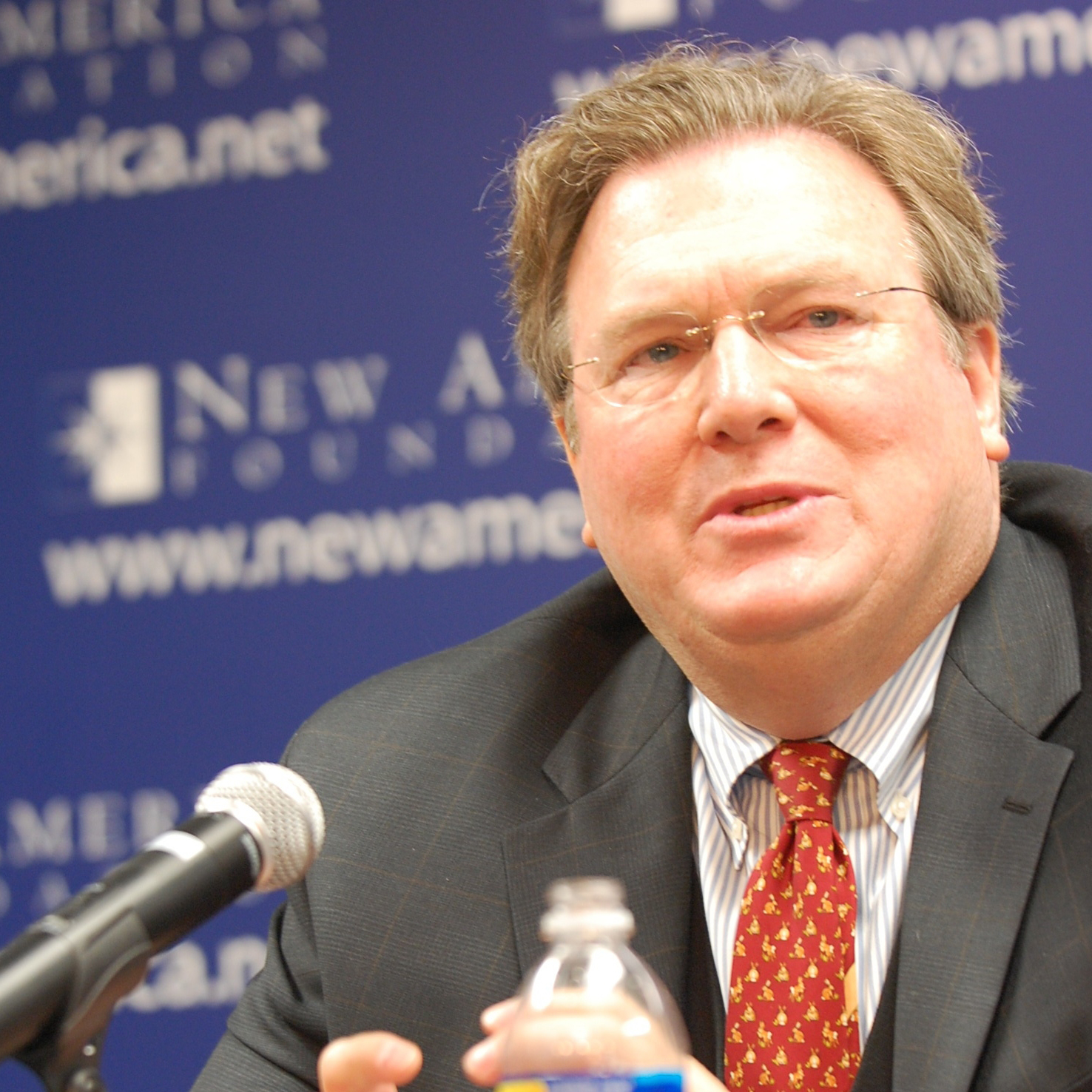
- Vague in 2009
- Born: 1956 (age 69–70); Wichita Falls, Texas
- Education: University of Texas
- Political party: Democratic
- Board member of: University of Pennsylvania Board of Trustees, Penn Medicine Board of Trustees, FringeArts Philadelphia, Innovation Advisory Board of the Abramson Cancer Center, University of Pennsylvania Press, Institute for New Economic Thinking

Pennsylvania Secretary of Banking and Securities
- In office 2020–2023
- Appointed by: Tom Wolf
- Preceded by: Robin Wiessmann
- Succeeded by: Wendy S. Spicher
- Website: Official website

Richard Wade Vague is an American businessperson, venture capitalist, and author who served as Secretary of Banking and Securities of Pennsylvania from 2020 until 2023.

== Early life and education ==
Vague was born in Wichita Falls, Texas to an Exxon engineer and a homemaker. He is the second of four children and the family moved around Texas often. He attended college at University of Texas and graduated with a B.S. in advertising in 1982. He worked part-time at American National Bank in Austin, Texas while attending college. After graduating he became the bank's chief marketing officer.

== Business career ==
Vague's business ventures in the banking and energy sectors were built on the use of affinity marketing.

=== Banking ===
Vague started his business career in banking at American National Bank (later renamed MBank Austin) as chief marketing officer. In 1985, Vague was president of Mpact Brokers, a discount brokerage subsidiary of MCorp Bank. In 1987 he was named president and CEO of MBank USA, a credit-card bank subsidiary of Lomas & Nettleton Financial Corporation. In 1989 as president of Wilmington, Delaware based credit card bank Lomas Bank USA, he and fellow MBank executive John Tolleson orchestrated the sale of Lomas' retail banking and credit card divisions to Merrill Lynch for $435 million in cash and $65 million in preferred stock. After the acquisition, Lomas Bank USA was renamed First USA Bank. In 1990, Vague was named president of bank card company First USA Holdings. In 1996, Vague and five other First USA executives sold off over 200,000 of their shares in the company. Bank One acquired First USA in 1997, then the fourth largest credit card issuer in the US, for $6.65 billion in stock. In June 1999, Vague and fellow Bank One executive James Stewart launched Wingspan Bank as an online banking division of Bank One. By October 1999, Vague resigned as head of Bank One's credit card operations after the credit card unit under-performed, which had impacted the bank's expected earnings by 15%.

In 2000, Vague and former Bank One executive James Stewart founded Juniper Bank. Juniper Bank became Barclaycard US when it was acquired by Barclays in 2004.

=== Energy ===
In 2007, Vague and Kevin Kleinschmidt, a former Barclaycard US executive, founded Energy Plus, an electricity and natural gas supply company. Energy Plus was acquired by NRG Energy in 2011 for $190 million.

=== Venture capitalism ===
In 2010, he founded venture capital firm Gabriel Investments.

== Politics ==
Vague has been a Republican, an independent and registered as a Democrat in 2017. In 1995 he served on Delaware's Education Improvement Commission, which recommended decentralization and deregulation of education decisions in the name of financial efficiency.

In 2017, he served as finance chair on Rebecca Rhynhart's campaign for Philadelphia City Controller.

In 2014, he was named to Pennsylvania Governor Tom Wolf's transition team as a member of a group to review the Department of Human Services. Governor Wolf appointed Vague as Acting Banking and Securities Secretary in February 2020.

Vague has donated significant sums of money to both Republicans and Democrats. In the first half of 2019 he gave $150,000 to political action committee Philadelphia 3.0.

Vague briefly considered running for president as a Democrat in 2020. He conducted 22 focus groups in early primary states.

== Books ==
Vague has written five books: The Paradox of Debt (2023), The Case for a Debt Jubilee (2021), An Illustrated Business History of the United States (2021), A Brief History of Doom (2019), and The Next Economic Disaster (2014). He claims that all profits from sales of his latest "Debt Jubilee" book will "go to charity."
