= 2008 Pennsylvania Auditor General election =

- November 4, 2008
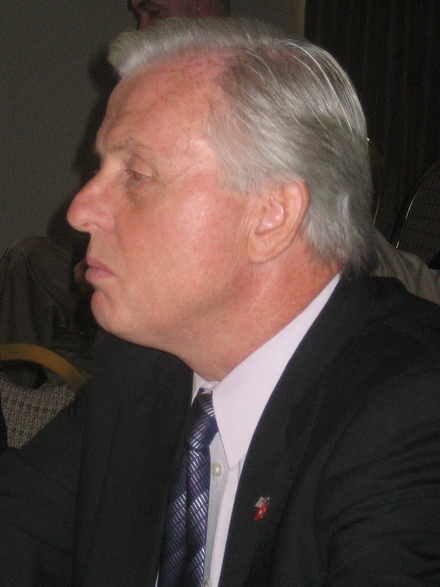

Nominee	Jack Wagner	Chet Beiler
Party	Democratic	Republican
Popular vote	3,336,219	2,134,543
Percentage	59.00%	37.75%
- County results Wagner: 40–50% 50–60% 60–70% 70–80% 80–90% Beiler: 40–50% 50–60% 60–70%
Auditor General before election
Jack Wagner
Democratic
Elected Auditor General
Jack Wagner
Democratic

The 2008 Pennsylvania Auditor General election was held on November 4, 2008. Incumbent Democrat Jack Wagner of Pittsburgh was unopposed for the Democratic nomination. His opponent was Republican construction executive Chet Beiler of Penn Township, Lancaster County. Beiler was also unopposed for nomination after primary opponent Chris Walsh withdrew from the race, citing issues with nomination petitions.

== Results ==
2008 Pennsylvania Auditor General election
Party	Candidate	Votes	%	±%
Democratic	Jack Wagner (incumbent)	3,336,219	59.00	▲6.94
Republican	Chet Beiler	2,134,543	37.75	▼7.66
Libertarian	Betsy Summers	184,029	3.25	▲2.26
Majority				
Turnout		5,654,791		
Democratic hold				

== See also ==
- Pennsylvania elections, 2008
