= Governor Bigler =

Governor Bigler may refer to:

- John Bigler (1805–1871), 3rd Governor of California
- William Bigler (1814–1880), 12th Governor of Pennsylvania
