= 1851 Pennsylvania gubernatorial election =

- October 14, 1851
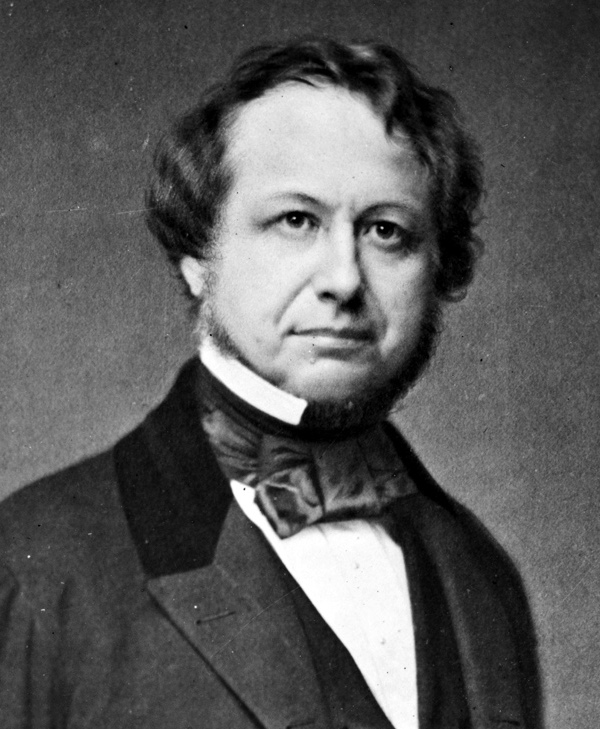

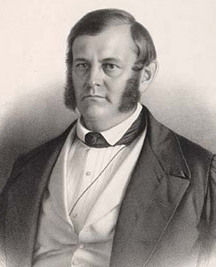
Nominee	William Bigler	William F. Johnston
Party	Democratic	Whig
Popular vote	186,489	178,034
Percentage	50.89%	48.59%
- County results Bigler: 40–50% 50–60% 60–70% 70–80% 80–90% Johnston: 50–60% 60–70% 70–80% Unknown/No Vote
Governor before election
William F. Johnston
Whig
Elected Governor
William Bigler
Democratic

The 1851 Pennsylvania gubernatorial election occurred on October 14, 1851. Incumbent governor William F. Johnston, a Whig, was a candidate for re-election but was narrowly defeated by Democratic candidate William Bigler.

== Results ==
Pennsylvania gubernatorial election, 1851
Party	Candidate	Votes	%
Democratic	William Bigler	186,489	50.89
Whig	William F. Johnston (incumbent)	178,034	48.59
Know Nothing	Kimber Cleaver	1,850	0.51
Total votes		366,373	100.00
Democratic gain from Whig			
