= Joan McCord =

American professor of criminology

- Born: August 4, 1930; New York City
- Died: February 24, 2004 (aged 73)
- Alma mater: Stanford University; Harvard University
- Occupation: Criminologist, sociologist
- Employer: Drexel University; Temple University

Joan Fish McCord (August 4, 1930 – 2004) was an American professor of criminology at Temple University. Through her experimental studies of delinquency, including the Cambridge Somerville Youth Study, and her philosophical perspective, she made important contributions to the understanding of developmental criminology, the differing roles of mothers, fathers, and neighborhoods, and the importance of differentiating between discipline and punishment. McCord was a recipient of the Herbert Bloch Award from the American Society of Criminology. and the International Society of Criminology's Emile Durkheim prize.

== Early life ==
Joan McCord was born as Joan Fish on August 4, 1930 in Manhattan, New York. She graduated from Stanford University with a degree in philosophy in 1952 and did graduate work at Harvard University, followed by a master's degree in education in 1956, also from Harvard University, and then an M.A. in 1966 and a Ph.D. in 1968, both in sociology, from Stanford.

== Career ==
=== Criminologist ===
In 1968 she joined the faculty in Drexel University and then moved to Temple University in 1987. In 1989 she became the first female president of the American Society of Criminology. She is particularly known for experimental longitudinal studies of mentoring programs, especially her work on the Cambridge Somerville Youth Study, which showed that such interventions could have counterintuitive negative effects. She also studied the causes of juvenile delinquency, and wrote about alcoholism and psychopathy. She is said to have made unique contributions by merging philosophical thinking with empirical social sciences.

=== Author ===
Aside from being a criminologist Joan McCord was known for her editorial work, particularly chapter four of the Cures That Harm which came out in The New York Times in 2002. A volume of her essays on criminology, edited by her son Geoffrey Sayre-McCord, were published postmortem by Temple University Press in 2007.

=== Media ===
In 1996 she was interviewed by The New York Times regarding a rape committed by a 12-year old. She also credited for appearing in Scared Straight!, a documentary on juvenile delinquents. Her researched was featured in an episode of Freakanomics, "When Helping Hurts."

== Personal life ==
Joan McCord was married to her first husband, the sociologist William Maxwell McCord, with whom she had co-authored numerous early books and articles. They had two sons, Geoffrey Sayre-McCord (who resides in Durham, N.C.), and Rob McCord and four grandsons. Her second husband, Carl A. Silver, was a professor at Drexel University. She died from lung cancer in Narberth, Pennsylvania, on February 24, 2004.
