= John F. Cordisco =

American politician

Member of the Pennsylvania House of Representatives from the 140th district
- In office 1981–1986
- Preceded by: John M. Rodgers
- Succeeded by: Thomas C. Corrigan

Personal details
- Born: February 17, 1955 (age 71) Mt. Holly, New Jersey
- Party: Democratic
- Occupation: Personal Injury Attorney
- Website: www.cordiscosaile.com

John F. Cordisco (born February 17, 1955) is a former Democratic member of the Pennsylvania House of Representatives, and a founding partner at Cordisco & Saile LLC.

While working as a steel worker, Cordisco earned an undergraduate degree from Rider College and a J.D. degree from Temple. He was elected to the local school board at the age of 22.

Cordisco was first elected to represent the 140th legislative district in the Pennsylvania House of Representatives in 1980 at the age of 25. During his tenure, Cordisco chaired the House Committee on Veterans Health Care and sponsored multiple pieces of legislation to provide assistance to veterans. He left the House in 1986.

He went on to establish a Cordisco & Bradway law firm in Bristol, Pennsylvania and helped found Team Capital Bank, a community bank in Eastern Pennsylvania. He is currently the founding partner at Cordisco & Saile LLC, where he practices in the area of serious personal injury claims. He has been appointed to serve as Judge Pro Temp in the Philadelphia Court System to assist the courts in resolving civil litigations in the area of personal injury. He is the current chair of the Bucks County Democratic Party. The political website PoliticsPA named him to their list of Pennsylvania's Best and Worst County Party Chairs, saying that he brought a "new sense of optimism" to Bucks County Democrats.

He was an unsuccessful candidate for the Democratic nomination in the 2008 Pennsylvania Treasurer election, losing to Robert McCord.
