= Jim Prokopiak =

American politician

Member of the Pennsylvania House of Representatives from the 140th district
- Incumbent
- Assumed office March 18, 2024
- Preceded by: John Galloway

Personal details
- Born: c. 1974
- Party: Democratic
- Spouse: Gail Humphrey
- Children: 3
- Education: West Chester University (B.A.); Temple University Beasley School of Law (J.D)
- Alma mater: Upper Moreland High School

James Prokopiak (born c. 1974) is an American politician who is currently the representative for the 140th District in the Pennsylvania House of Representatives.

== Political career ==
From 2002 to 2009, Prokopiak served as a supervisor in Falls Township, Bucks County, Pennsylvania. In 2006, he ran to represent the 140th District in the Pennsylvania House of Representatives, losing the Democratic primary to John Galloway. Prokopiak was elected to the Pennsbury School Board in 2021. After Galloway resigned in December 2023 to assume a local judicial office, Prokopiak forwarded his name to the Bucks County Democratic Party to be considered for the party's nomination in the successive special election. Out of a field of three candidates, Prokopiak was unanimously chosen by the party's executive board. He defeated Republican candidate Candace Cabanas in the February 2024 special election.

== Political positions ==
Prokopiak is pro-choice and supports codifying abortion rights into the Pennsylvania Constitution. He also supports the right to health. Prokopiak opposes school voucher programs and instead supports more consistent funding for public schools. He supports legalizing marijuana and raising the minimum wage to $15 an hour.

== Personal life ==
Prokopiak graduated from Upper Moreland High School in 1992. He earned a bachelor of arts degree in political science from West Chester University in 1996 and a juris doctor degree from Temple University School of Law in 2000. Prokopiak and his wife, Gail Humphrey, have three children and reside in Levittown, Pennsylvania.
