= John M. Rodgers =

American politician

Member of the Pennsylvania House of Representatives from the 140th district
- In office 1979–1980
- Preceded by: Theodore Berlin
- Succeeded by: John F. Cordisco

Personal details
- Born: March 3, 1928 Bristol, Pennsylvania
- Died: September 29, 2012 (aged 84) Bristol, Pennsylvania
- Party: Democratic

John M. Rodgers (March 3, 1928 – September 29, 2012) was a Democratic member of the Pennsylvania House of Representatives. He was born in Bristol. He died at his home in 2012.
