= Cambridge Somerville Youth Study =

Criminology study

The Cambridge-Somerville Youth Study was the first large-scale randomised experiment in the history of criminology. It was commissioned in 1936 by Dr. Richard Cabot, a Boston physician who proposed an experiment to evaluate the effects of early intervention in preventing or reducing rates of juvenile delinquency. It was started in 1939 by Edwin Powers and Helen Witmer.

== Planning ==
For the study, 506 boys, ages 5 to 13 years old who lived in youth facilities in eastern Massachusetts, were selected and matched carefully into either a treatment group or a control group. The boys in the treatment group were assigned a counselor and received academic tutoring, medical and psychiatric attention, and referrals to YMCA, Boy Scouts, summer camps and community programs. Boys in the control group were only told to report regularly.

== Follow-up studies ==
For the initial and ten year follow up, there was either no difference or a greater rate of negative results as reported by the authors. 30 years after the initial experiment about 95% of the participants were found by using public records and surveyed by Joan McCord.

McCord found that when compared to the control group, men in the treatment group were, to a statistically significant degree

1. “more likely to commit (at least) a second crime”
2. “more likely to evidence signs of alcoholism,”
3. “more commonly manifest signs of serious mental illness”
4. more likely to die younger
5. “more likely to report having had at least one stress-related disease; in particular, they were more likely to have experience high blood pressure or heart trouble,”
6. ”tended to have occupations with lower prestige,”
7. “tended more often to report their work as not satisfying.”

Yet the program had no significant impacts on juvenile arrest rates measured by official or unofficial records. The program also had no impacts on adult arrest rates. There were no significant differences between the two groups in the number of serious crimes committed, age at when a first crime was committed, age when first committing a serious crime, or age after no serious crime was committed. A larger proportion of criminals from the treatment group went on to commit additional crimes than their counterparts in the control group.

== Later conclusions ==
In 1981, McCord published a study from new data she gathered about the original participants of the Cambridge-Somerville Youth Study. Compared to the control group of the study, she found that a significantly greater proportion of the treatment group

- were alcoholic
- had serious mental health diagnoses
- had stress-related diseases, especially heart-related
- had jobs with lower prestige
- expressed lower job satisfaction in blue-collar jobs

She formulated four hypotheses about why the program had some damaging results to the treatment group: (1) that counselors imposed middle-class values on lower-class youth which did not help the youth. (2) that boys in the treatment group became dependent on counselors and, when the program ended, the boys lost a source of help. (3) that the treatment group suffered a labeling effect. (4) that the helpfulness of the counselors increased expectations of the boys in the treatment group which could not be sustained, resulting in disillusionment after the program was completed.
