= James Pollock (American politician) =

American politician (1810–1890)

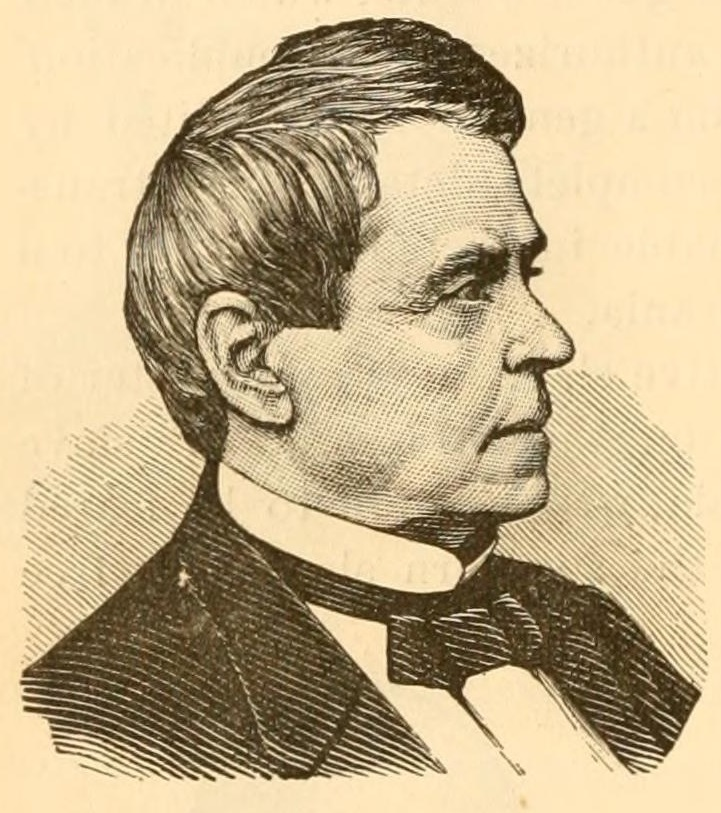

13th Governor of Pennsylvania
- In office January 16, 1855 – January 19, 1858
- Preceded by: William Bigler
- Succeeded by: William F. Packer

Member of the U.S. House of Representatives from Pennsylvania's 13th district
- In office April 5, 1844 – March 3, 1849
- Preceded by: Henry Frick
- Succeeded by: Joseph Casey

Director of the United States Mint
- In office May 1861 – September 1866
- President: Abraham Lincoln; Andrew Johnson
- Preceded by: James Ross Snowden
- Succeeded by: William Millward
- In office May 1869 – March 1873
- President: Ulysses S. Grant
- Preceded by: Henry Linderman
- Succeeded by: Henry Linderman

Personal details
- Born: September 11, 1810 Milton, Pennsylvania, U.S.
- Died: April 19, 1890 (aged 79) Lock Haven, Pennsylvania, U.S.
- Resting place: Milton Cemetery, PA
- Party: Whig
- Spouse: Sarah Ann Hepburn (m. 1837–1886; her death)
- Children: 3 sons 5 daughters
- Education: College of New Jersey

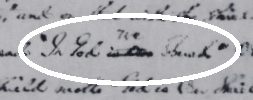
Salmon P. Chase, Treasury Secretary, scribes "In God is Our Trust," scratches out "is Our" and overwrites "We" to arrive at "In God We Trust" in a December 9, 1863, letter to James Pollock, Director of the Philadelphia Mint.

James Pollock (September 11, 1810 – April 19, 1890) was the 13th governor of Pennsylvania from 1855 to 1858.

== Political career ==
James Pollock graduated from the College of New Jersey at Princeton before setting up a law practice in his home community, in Milton, Pennsylvania. District attorney and judicial appointments followed and in 1844 he was elected to the United States House of Representatives where he served three successive terms.

As a freshman congressman, Pollock boarded in the same rooming house as another new congressman, Abraham Lincoln (who would later become the 16th President of the United States), and they soon developed a mutual respect and longstanding friendship.

Pollock was an early supporter of Samuel Morse and his idea for a telegraph and was instrumental in getting the United States Congress to appropriate a small amount to help build the first line. He was present in the room when the first message, "What hath God wrought" was received, ushering in a new age of telecommunication.

Pollock was also the first in congress to advocate the construction of a railroad across the continent, connecting newly acquired California with the east. In a speech in 1848 he said, "At the risk of being considered insane, I will venture the prediction that, in less than twenty-five years from this evening, a railroad will be completed and in operation between New York and San Francisco, California." The transcontinental railroad was completed in 1869, four years inside the limit fixed by Mr. Pollock.

He returned to the judiciary in Pennsylvania's Eighth District in 1850.

== Governorship (1855-1858) ==
Pollock was nominated by the Whig Party for the governor's race in 1854, amid controversy surrounding the Kansas–Nebraska Act. his campaign was favored by advocates of powerful temperance and nativist movements. He defeated the Democratic nominee, and the incumbent governor William Bigler by 36,831 votes.

A large crowd attended his inaugural ceremonies on January 16, 1855. Historians believe this was the first Pennsylvania inaugural ceremony to be held in the "open air." Attendance was estimated at 10,000 to 15,000 guests.

During his administration, Pennsylvania began to sell its publicly held railroads and canals, and he helped steer the state through the financial Panic of 1857. He chaired the Pennsylvania delegation to the Peace Conference of 1861, and was appointed by President Lincoln as Director of the Philadelphia mint that same year. While leading the United States Mint, he was instructed by the Secretary of the Treasury Salmon P. Chase in a letter to come up with suggestions for including "the trust of our people in God" in a motto on America's coins. Pollock proposed a number of mottos, including "Our Trust Is In God" and "God Our Trust," which Chase ultimately revised to "In God We Trust".

== Later career ==
During his tenure at the Mint, the American Philosophical Society elected Pollock to membership in 1863.

Pollock was a member of the National Reform Association, which seeks to add a Christian amendment to the U.S. Constitution.

The 1864 two-cent piece was the first coin with the approved motto and today all American coins are inscribed with "In God We Trust."

James Pollock was also a trustee of Lafayette College from 1855 to 1876, and its president from 1863 onwards.

== Christian faith ==
James Pollock possessed a strong faith in God. Concurring with Secretary Chase's instructions, in his 1863 report to the Secretary of the Treasury, he wrote, "We claim to be a Christian nation—why should we not vindicate our character by honoring the God of Nations…Our national coinage should do this. Its legends and devices should declare our trust in God—in Him who is "King of Kings and Lord of Lords." The motto suggested, "God our Trust," is taken from our National Hymn, the Star-Spangled Banner." The sentiment is familiar to every citizen of our country—it has thrilled the hearts and fallen in song from the lips of millions of American Freemen. The time for the introduction of this or a similar motto, is propitious and appropriate. 'Tis an hour of National peril and danger—an hour when man's strength is weakness—when our strength and our nation's strength and salvation, must be in the God of Battles and of Nations. Let us reverently acknowledge his sovereignty, and let our coinage declare our trust in God."

Mr. Pollock served as Vice President of the American Sunday School Union from 1855 until his death in 1890. In that role he had the distinction of presiding over more mission business meetings than any man in the history of AMF other than the first president. Greatly respected by his fellow managers, it was recorded that 'he was always eager to do his Lord's business with earnestness and dispatch' and while conscious of the power of his masterful mind and loving heart, his fellows managers 'most appreciated his depth of consecration.'

Pollock co-founded Sunday Breakfast Rescue Mission, a homeless shelter and soup kitchen, in 1878 with notable fellow churchgoers John B. Stetson and John Wanamaker. What began as a simple cup of coffee and roll before church has grown to become the leading emergency shelter and largest indoor provider of meals in Philadelphia.

== Memorialization ==
Pollock has a residence area, dining commons, computer learning center, and campus road named for him on the University Park campus of Penn State University, the institution which received its charter during his term as governor. Included in a Model UN civil war committee.

== Sources ==
- United States Congress. "James Pollock (id: P000416)". Biographical Directory of the United States Congress.
- The Political Graveyard
- The Sunday School Movement and the American Sunday School Union by Edwin Wilbur Rice: Union Press, 1917.
- The Torch and the Flag by Galbraith Hall Todd; Union Press, 1966.
- United States Mint Annual Report, 1863.
- In Memoriam, James Pollack: published privately by the family of James Pollack, c. 1890.

Party political offices
Preceded by William F. Johnston	Whig nominee for Governor of Pennsylvania; 1854	Succeeded by None
U.S. House of Representatives
Preceded by Henry Frick	Member of the U.S. House of Representatives from Pennsylvania's 13th congressional district 1844–1849	Succeeded by Joseph Casey
Political offices
Preceded by William Bigler	Governor of Pennsylvania; 1855–1858	Succeeded by William F. Packer
Government offices
Preceded by James Ross Snowden	Director of the United States Mint; May 1861 – September 1866	Succeeded by William Millward
Preceded by Henry Linderman	Director of the United States Mint; May 1869 – March 1873	Succeeded by Henry Linderman
