= 1848 Pennsylvania gubernatorial election =

- October 10, 1848
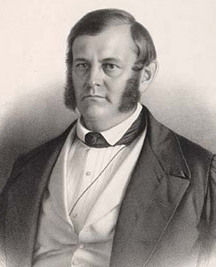

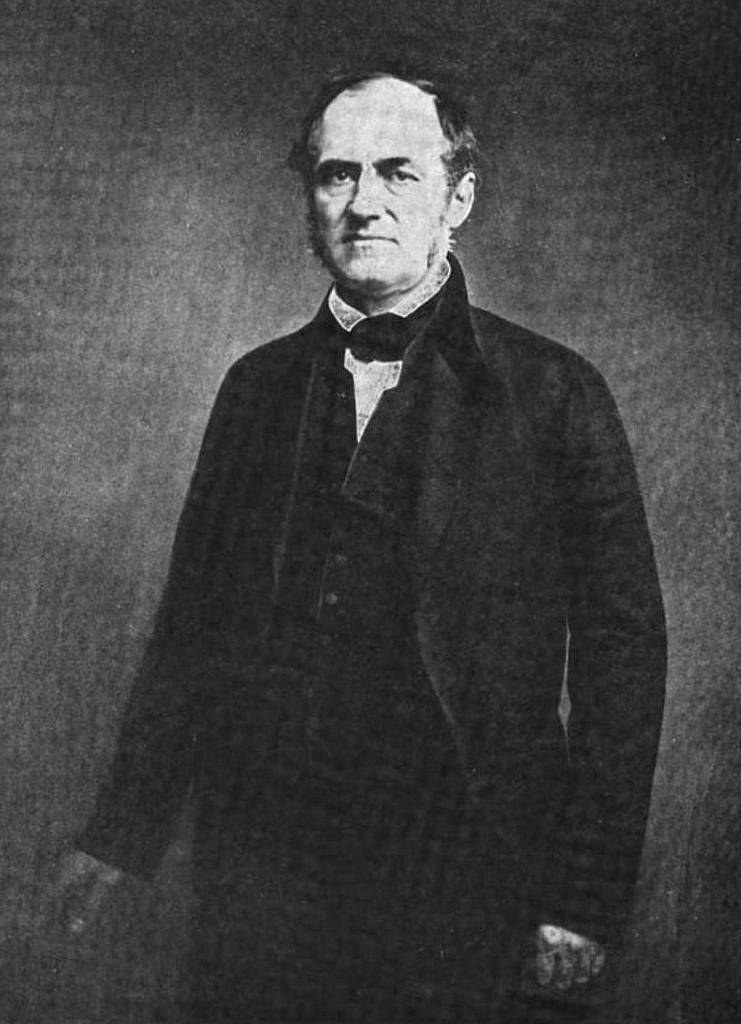
| Nominee | William F. Johnston | Morris Longstreth |
| Party | Whig | Democratic |
| Popular vote | 168,522 | 168,225 |
| Percentage | 50.03% | 49.95% |
- County Results Johnston: 50–60% 60–70% 70–80% Longstreth: 50–60% 60–70% 80–90% Unknown/No Vote
Governor before election
William F. Johnston
Whig
Elected Governor
William F. Johnston
Whig

The 1848 Pennsylvania gubernatorial election occurred on October 10, 1848. Incumbent Whig governor William F. Johnston, who became governor following the resignation and subsequent death of Francis R. Shunk in July 1848, narrowly defeated Democratic candidate Morris Longstreth by 297 votes, to win a full term.

== Results ==
Pennsylvania gubernatorial election, 1848
| Party | Candidate | Votes | % |
|---|---|---|---|
| Whig | William F. Johnston (incumbent) | 168,522 | 50.03 |
| Democratic | Morris Longstreth | 168,225 | 49.95 |
| Free Soil | Edward D. Gazzam | 48 | 0.01 |
| Liberty | Thomas Earle | 7 | 0.00 |
| Liberty | Francis Julius LeMoyne | 6 | 0.00 |
| N/A | Others | 11 | 0.00 |
| Total votes | | 336,819 | 100.00 |
