= Pennsylvania Housing Finance Agency =

Non-profit housing resource organization

- PHFA Seal

Agency overview
- Formed: 1972
- Jurisdiction: State government of Pennsylvania
- Headquarters: Harrisburg, Pennsylvania
- Employees: 320+
- Agency executive: Robin Wiessmann, Executive Director & CEO
- Website: www.phfa.org

The Pennsylvania Housing Finance Agency is a non-profit organization which serves the people of Pennsylvania by offering affordable housing resources, including loans and rent assistance. PHFA was created by an Executive Order by the Pennsylvania General Assembly in 1972.

== Board of directors ==
PHFA is governed by a 14-member Board appointed by the Governor of Pennsylvania. The Board of the Pennsylvania Housing Finance Agency (PHFA) sets policy and oversees the organization's operations. The Board consists of the Secretary of Pennsylvania Department of Banking, the Secretary of Pennsylvania Department of Community and Economic Development, the Secretary of Pennsylvania Department of Human Services, and the Pennsylvania State Treasurer serve by virtue of their offices. Four members are named to the Board by the majority and minority leaders of the Pennsylvania State Senate and Pennsylvania House of Representatives. Six private citizen members are appointed by the Governor and confirmed by the State Senate.

== Functions ==
As a mission-driven, nonprofit corporation providing affordable housing products to the citizens of the Commonwealth of Pennsylvania, PHFA offers programs and administers funds on behalf of state (Pennsylvania Department of State), Federal government of the United States, and tax related programs and receives fees to deliver these programs. In addition to its major programs, PHFA conducts housing studies, promotes counseling and education for renters and homebuyers, encourages supportive services at apartments it has financed, administers rent subsidy contracts for the Federal government of the United States, and acts as an advocate to promote the benefits of decent, affordable shelter for those who need it most.

== History ==
As of January 2020, PHFA has generated nearly $14.6 billion of funding for more than 178,325 single-family home mortgage loans, helped fund the construction of 136,215 rental units, distributed more than $109.2 million to support local housing initiatives, and saved the homes of more than 50,200 families from foreclosure.

== See also ==
- National Council of State Housing Agencies
- Federal Housing Finance Agency
- United States Department of Housing and Urban Development
- National Housing Act of 1934
- List of Pennsylvania state agencies

== See also: Other HFAs ==
- California Housing Finance Agency
- Kentucky Housing Corporation
- Oklahoma Housing Finance Agency
- Oregon Housing and Community Services Department
- Minnesota Housing Finance Agency
- New York State Housing Finance Agency
- Vermont Housing Finance Agency
