= Pennsylvania House of Representatives, District 140 =

American legislative district

Pennsylvania's 140th State House of Representatives district
Representative
Jim Prokopiak; D–Falls Township
- Population (2022) • Citizens of voting age: 61,806; 47,363

The 140th Pennsylvania House of Representatives District is located in Southeastern Pennsylvania and has been vacant since 2023. A special election to fill the vacancy was held on February 13, 2024, which was won by Democrat Jim Prokopiak.

== District profile ==
The 140th District is located in Bucks County. It includes the following areas:

- Falls Township
- Middletown Township (PART)
  - District Lower (PART)
    - Divisions 03, 04, 05, 06, 07, 08, 09, 10, 11, 12
- Morrisville
- Tullytown

== Representatives ==
Representative	Party	Years	District home	Note
Prior to 1969, seats were apportioned by county.
Milton Berkes	Democrat	1969 – 1974		
Theodore Berlin	Democrat	1975 – 1978		
John M. Rodgers	Democrat	1979 – 1980		
John F. Cordisco	Democrat	1981 – 1986		
Thomas C. Corrigan, Sr.	Democrat	1987 – 2006	Bristol	Retired
John Galloway	Democrat	2007 – 2023	Levittown	Resigned December 14, 2023 after being elected Magisterial Judge in Falls Township
Jim Prokopiak	Democrat	2024 – present	Falls Township	Elected in special election to replace Galloway

== Recent election results ==
2024 Special Election: Pennsylvania House, District 140
Party	Candidate	Votes	%
Democratic	Jim Prokopiak	6,462	67.73
Republican	Candace Cabanas	3,079	32.27
Total votes		9,541	100.00
Democratic hold			

PA House election, 2022: Pennsylvania House, District 140
Party	Candidate	Votes	%
Democratic	John Galloway (incumbent)	Unopposed	
Total votes		17,970	100.00
Democratic hold			

PA House election, 2020: Pennsylvania House, District 140
Party	Candidate	Votes	%
Democratic	John Galloway (incumbent)	19,840	59.99
Republican	Jeanine McGee	13,230	40.01
Total votes		33,160	100.00
Democratic hold			

PA House election, 2018: Pennsylvania House, District 140
Party	Candidate	Votes	%
Democratic	John Galloway (incumbent)	Unopposed	
Total votes		17,490	100.00
Democratic hold			

PA House election, 2016: Pennsylvania House, District 140
Party	Candidate	Votes	%
Democratic	John Galloway (incumbent)	Unopposed	
Total votes		21,521	100.00
Democratic hold			

PA House election, 2014: Pennsylvania House, District 140
Party	Candidate	Votes	%
Democratic	John Galloway (incumbent)	Unopposed	
Total votes		11,530	100.00
Democratic hold			

PA House election, 2012: Pennsylvania House, District 140
Party	Candidate	Votes	%
Democratic	John Galloway (incumbent)	18,465	73.15
Republican	Eric David	6,777	26.85
Total votes		25,242	100.00
Democratic hold			

PA House election, 2010: Pennsylvania House, District 140
Party	Candidate	Votes	%
Democratic	John Galloway (incumbent)	11,387	63.32
Republican	Jane Burger	6,596	36.68
Total votes		17,983	100.00
Democratic hold			
