= Theodore Berlin =

American politician

Member of the Pennsylvania House of Representatives from the 140th district
- In office 1975–1978
- Preceded by: Milton Berkes
- Succeeded by: John M. Rodgers

Personal details
- Born: August 17, 1938 New York City, New York
- Died: May 1987 (aged 48)
- Party: Democratic

Theodore Berlin (born August 17, 1938 – May 1987) was a Democratic member of the Pennsylvania House of Representatives.
