= 2012 Pennsylvania State Treasurer election =

2012 Pennsylvania Treasurer election
- November 6, 2012
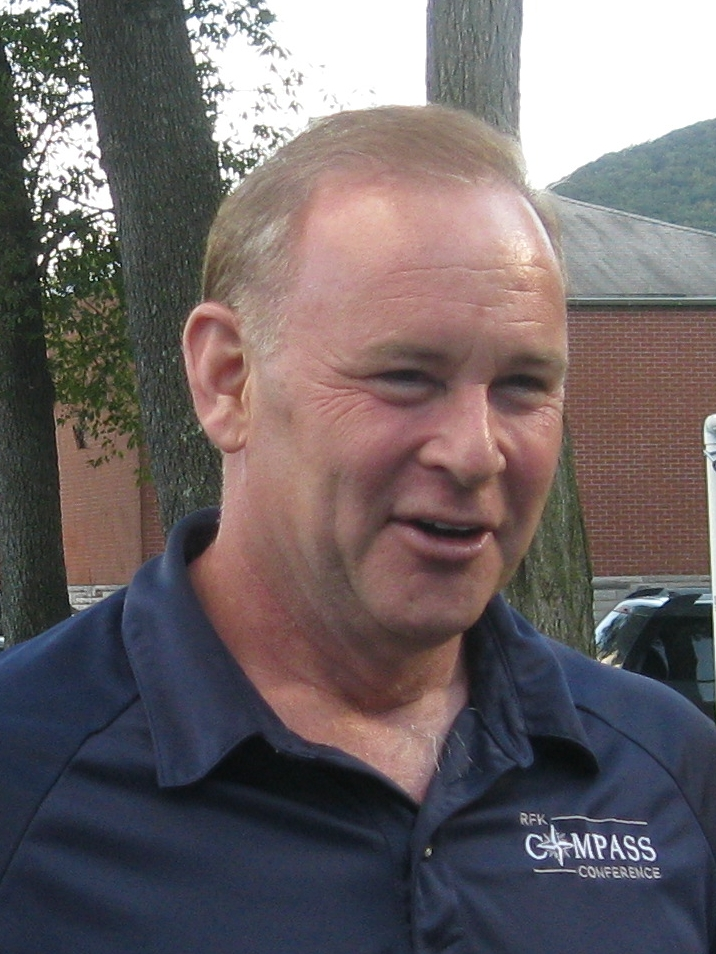

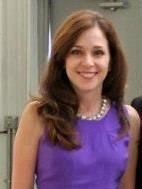
Nominee	Rob McCord	Diana Irey Vaughan
Party	Democratic	Republican
Popular vote	2,872,344	2,405,654
Percentage	52.53%	43.99%
- McCord: 40–50% 50–60% 60–70% 80–90% Vaughan: 40–50% 50–60% 60–70% 70–80%
Treasurer before election
Rob McCord
Democratic
Elected Treasurer
Rob McCord
Democratic

The Pennsylvania Treasurer election of 2012 was held on November 6, 2012. The primary election was held on April 24, 2012.

== Candidates ==
Incumbent Rob McCord and challenger Diana Irey Vaughan both ran unopposed in the Democratic and Republican primaries, respectively. Patricia M. Fryman was the Libertarian candidate.

== Results ==
On November 6, 2012, McCord defeated Irey Vaughan, a Washington County Commissioner and former Congressional candidate, to be re-elected Treasurer of Pennsylvania.

2012 Pennsylvania Treasurer election
Party	Candidate	Votes	%	±%
Democratic	Rob McCord (Inc.)	2,872,344	52.53%	−2.45%
Republican	Diana Irey Vaughan	2,405,654	43.99%	+1.09%
Libertarian	Patricia Fryman	190,406	3.48%	+1.36%
Majority		466,690	8.54%	
Turnout		5,468,404		
Democratic hold				

=== By congressional district ===
Despite losing the state, Irey Vaughan won 13 of the 18 congressional districts.

District	McCord	Irey Vaughan	Representative
1st	82%	17%	Bob Brady
2nd	90%	9%	Chaka Fattah
3rd	45%	51%	Mike Kelly
4th	41%	54%	Jason Altmire
4th	41%	54%	Scott Perry
5th	42%	52%	Glenn Thompson
6th	46%	50%	Jim Gerlach
7th	46%	52%	Pat Meehan
8th	48.7%	49.2%	Mike Fitzpatrick
9th	39%	56%	Bill Shuster
10th	38%	57%	Tom Marino
11th	46%	49%	Lou Barletta
12th	46%	50%	Mark Critz
12th	46%	50%	Keith Rothfus
13th	67%	32%	Allyson Schwartz
14th	70%	26%	Mike Doyle
15th	48.0%	48.5%	Charlie Dent
16th	44%	52%	Joe Pitts
17th	58%	38%	Tim Holden
17th	58%	38%	Matt Cartwright
18th	44%	52%	Tim Murphy
