= Geoffrey Sayre-McCord =

American philosopher

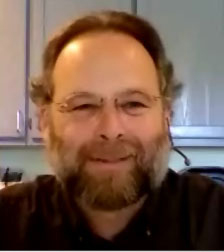
- Born: December 10, 1956 (age 69); Boston, Massachusetts, U.S.
- Education: Oberlin College (BA), University of Pittsburgh (PhD)
- Occupations: Philosopher, professor, author
- Employer: University of North Carolina
- Known for: Moral realism,
- Notable work: "Essays on Moral Realism" "Moral Theory and Explanatory Impotence" "Hume and the Bauhaus Theory of Ethics"
- Spouse: Harriet Sayre (m. 1980)
- Children: 2
- Parents: William Maxwell McCord (father); Joan McCord (mother)
- Relatives: Rob McCord (brother)
- Website: https://philosophy.unc.edu/people/geoffrey-sayre-mccord/

Geoffrey Sayre-McCord (né McCord, born December 10, 1956) is an American philosopher who works in moral theory, ethics, meta-ethics, the history of ethics and epistemology. He teaches at the University of North Carolina, Chapel Hill. He is also the director of the Philosophy, Politics and Economics Society.

== Education and career ==
Sayre-McCord received his BA from Oberlin College and his PhD (working with David Gauthier, Wilfrid Sellars, Nicholas Rescher, Clark Glamour, and Kurt Baier) from the University of Pittsburgh.

Sayre-McCord is the Morehead-Cain Alumni Distinguished Professor of Philosophy and Director of the Philosophy, Politics, and Economics Program at the University of North Carolina, where he has taught since 1985. He was a Professorial Fellow at the University of Edinburgh from 2013-2016, and a Laurance S. Rockefeller Visiting Professor at Princeton University in 2015-2016. He is a frequent visitor at the Australian National University and has been a visiting professor at the University of Auckland and the University of California/Irvine.

Sayre-McCord has written widely on metaethics, David Hume, contractualism and on issues at the intersection of philosophy, politics, and economics. He is author of the Stanford Encyclopedia of Philosophy entries on moral realism and metaethics. For five years, Sayre-McCord was a co-editor of the journal Noûs.

In 2019, Sayre-McCord received the Philip L. Quinn Prize from the American Philosophical Association, for "service to philosophy and philosophers, broadly construed."

== Family ==
Sayre-McCord's parents were William Maxwell McCord and Joan McCord, both of whom were college professors. His brother is Rob McCord, a former Pennsylvania Treasurer. He is married to Harriet Sayre, the daughter of Francis Bowes Sayre Jr. and great-granddaughter of President Woodrow Wilson.

== Publications ==
=== Selected articles ===
- "Coherence and Models for Moral Theorizing," Pacific Philosophical Quarterly (1985)
- "Deontic Logic and the Priority of Moral Theory," Noûs (1986)
- "The Many Moral Realisms," Southern Journal of Philosophy, Spindel Conference Supplement, (1986)
- "Moral Theory and Explanatory Impotence," Midwest Studies (1988)
- "Deception and Reasons to be Moral," American Philosophical Quarterly, (1989)
- "Functional Explanations and Reasons as Causes," Philosophical Perspectives (1990)
- "Being a Realist about Relativism," Philosophical Studies (1991)
- "Normative Explanations," Philosophical Perspectives (1992)
- "On Why Hume's General Point of View Isn't Ideal -- and Shouldn't Be," Social Philosophy and Policy (1994)
- "Coherentist Epistemology and Moral Theory," in Moral Knowledge?, ed. by Sinnott-Armstrong and Timmons (1996)
- "Hume and the Bauhaus Theory of Ethics," Midwest Studies (1996)
- "Hume's Representation Argument Against Rationalism," Manuscrito (1997)
- "The Meta-Ethical Problem," Ethics (1997)
- "'Good' on Twin Earth," Philosophical Issues (1997)
- "Contractarianism," Blackwell Guide to Ethical Theory (1999)
- "Criminal Justice and Legal Reparations," Philosophical Issues (2001)
- "Mill's 'Proof': A More than Half-Hearted Defense," Social Philosophy and Policy (2001)
- "On the Relevance of Ignorance to the Demands of Morality," Rationality, Rules, and Ideals, ed. by Sinnott-Armstrong (2002)
- "Moral Realism," Oxford Handbook of Moral Theory, ed. by Copp (2006)
- "Moral Semantics and Empirical Enquiry," Moral Psychology, ed. by Sinnott-Armstrong (2008)
- "Hume on Practical Morality and Inert Reason," Oxford Studies in Metaethics, ed. by Shafer-Landau (2008)
- "Sentiments and Spectators: Adam Smith's Theory of Moral Judgment," The Philosophy of Adam Smith, ed. by Brown and Fleischacker (2010)
- "Real World Theory, Complacency, and Aspiration," with Geoff Brennan, in Philosophical Studies (2020) 178, https://doi.org/10.1007/s11098-020-01531-x.
- "Hume's Robust Theory of Practical Reason," in Routledge Handbook of Practical Reason, ed. by Chang and Sylvan (Routledge, 2021), pp. 141–159.
- "On Cooperation," with Geoff Brennan, in Analyse & Kritik, January 2018, Vol. 40, pp. 107–130.
- "Hume's Theory of Public Reason," Public Reason in Political Philosophy: Classic Sources and Contemporary Commentaries, edited by Gaus and Turner (Routledge, 2017), pp. 303–329.
- "Do Normative Facts Matter...To What Is Feasible?" with Geoff Brennan, in Social Philosophy and Policy, 2016, vol. 33, #1-2, pp. 434 – 456.
- "Hume on the Artificial Virtues," in the Oxford Handbook of David Hume, edited by Russell (Oxford University Press, 2016), pp. 435–469.

=== Edited volumes ===
- Essays on Moral Realism (Cornell University Press, 1988)
- Hume: Moral Philosophy (Hackett Publishing, 2006)
- Philosophy, Politics, and Economics (Oxford University Press, 2015), with Jonathan Anomaly, Geoffrey Brennan, and Michael Munger.

== See also ==
- American philosophy
- List of American philosophers
