= Thomas C. Corrigan =

American politician (1938–2022)

Thomas C. Corrigan Sr.

Member of the Pennsylvania House of Representatives from the 140th district
- In office January 6, 1987 – November 30, 2006
- Preceded by: John F. Cordisco
- Succeeded by: John Galloway

Personal details
- Born: February 26, 1938 Bristol, Pennsylvania, U.S.
- Died: December 1, 2022 (aged 84) Naples, Florida, U.S.
- Party: Democratic
- Spouse(s): Annabelle M. (d. 2001); Velda I.
- Children: 3 children

Thomas C. Corrigan Sr. (February 26, 1938 – December 1, 2022) was an American politician who was a Democratic member of the Pennsylvania House of Representatives.

Corrigan was a 1956 graduate of Bristol High School.

Corrigan was first elected to represent the 140th legislative district in the Pennsylvania House of Representatives in 1986. He retired prior to the 2006 election. In 2007, it was revealed that Corrigan, as a lame duck legislator, attended legislative training trips at the public's expense after his defeat.

Corrigan served in the Pennsylvania Air National Guard and on the Bristol Borough Council. He was involved in the real estate business and worked as a rigger in the steel business. He died on December 1, 2022, in Naples, Florida, at the age of 84. He lived in Naples, Florida, for eight years until his death.
