= 1854 Pennsylvania gubernatorial election =

- October 10, 1854
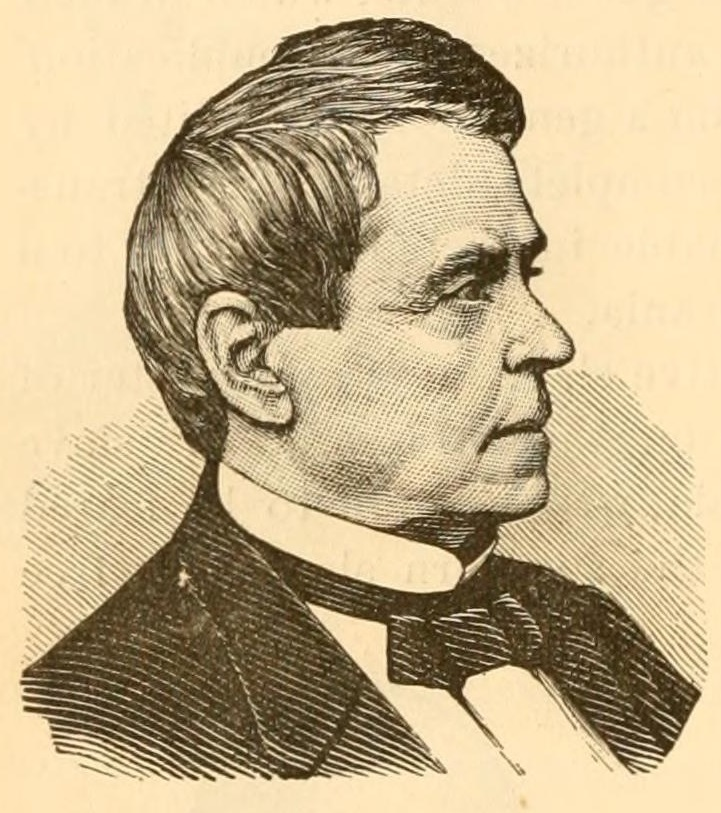

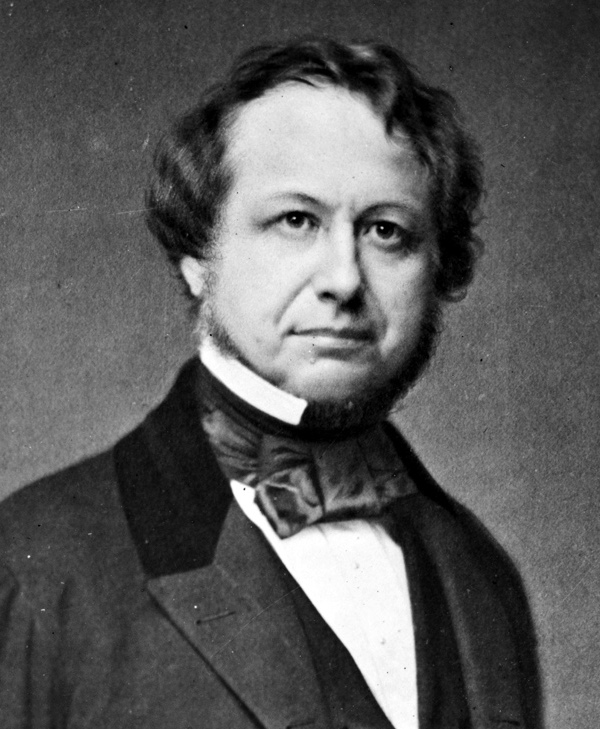
| Nominee | James Pollock | William Bigler |
| Party | Whig | Democratic |
| Popular vote | 203,822 | 166,991 |
| Percentage | 54.64% | 44.77% |
- County results Pollock: 50–60% 60–70% 70–80% Bigler: 50–60% 60–70% 70–80% Unknown/No Vote
Governor before election
William Bigler
Democratic
Elected Governor
James Pollock
Whig

The 1854 Pennsylvania gubernatorial election occurred on October 10, 1854. Incumbent governor William Bigler, a Democrat, was a candidate for re-election but was defeated by Whig candidate James Pollock.

Bigler became the last sitting Governor of Pennsylvania to be defeated for reelection until Tom Corbett in 2014.

This was the last time that a candidate not from the Democratic or Republican parties was elected Governor of Pennsylvania.

== Results ==
Pennsylvania gubernatorial election, 1854
| Party | Candidate | Votes | % |
|---|---|---|---|
| Whig | James Pollock | 203,822 | 54.64 |
| Democratic | William Bigler (incumbent) | 166,991 | 44.77 |
| Free Soil | B. Rush Bradford | 2,194 | 0.59 |
| Total votes | | 373,007 | 100.00 |
| Whig gain from Democratic | | | |
