= Thomas J. Ellis =

American politician (born 1959)

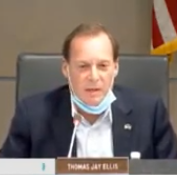

Member of the Montgomery County Board of Commissioners
- In office January 7, 2004 – January 7, 2008
- Preceded by: Michael Marino
- Succeeded by: Bruce Castor

Personal details
- Born: 14 July 1959 (age 67) Abington, Pennsylvania
- Party: Republican Party
- Education: University of Pennsylvania (BA, JD)

Thomas Jay "Tom" Ellis (born 14 July 1959, Abington, Pennsylvania) is a Pennsylvania public finance attorney. He served several terms as county commissioner of Montgomery County, Pennsylvania, one of the largest counties in Pennsylvania, before being dropped from the ticket during an intra-party feud. An ally of controversial Republican National Committeeman Bob Asher, he is a prominent figure in the Pennsylvania Republican Party.

== Education and legal career ==
He earned a degree from the University of Pennsylvania in 1982. He earned a law degree from the University of Pennsylvania Law School in 1985, where he was Editor of University of Pennsylvania Law Review. As special counsel with Ballard, Spahr, Andrews & Ingersoll in Philadelphia, he handles public finance and higher education legal issues. Specifically, his legal works focuses on facilitating tax-exempt financing projects for local governments and municipal authorities. He also manages the firm's lobbying on the Commonwealth of Pennsylvania.

== Political career ==
From 1990 to 2002, he served as a member of the Cheltenham Township Board of Commissioners. In 2001, he was appointed as a board member of SEPTA.

He was first elected as a county commissioner in Montgomery County Board of Commissioners in 2003 as running mate with Jim Matthews. He was chair of the county commissioners' board from 2006 through 2008.

== 2008 election and scandal ==
In the 2008 election, Ellis was dropped from the Republican ticket because of an incident with former fiancée who filed and then withdrew a protection from abuse order against him. As a result, Ellis was unable to secure the county GOP's endorsement for a second four-year term in 2007. While Ellis denied physically abusing her, he did publicly apologize to her at a county commissioners meeting. Ellis unsuccessfully attempted to obtain the Republican nomination independent of the party apparatus, losing to Bruce Castor and Jim Matthews.

In 2008, he was the Republican nominee for Pennsylvania Treasurer. He was endorsed by the Pittsburgh Post-Gazette, whose editorial board praised his "good credentials" and his "interesting ideas" on campaign finance reform and for his plans to improve Pennsylvania's college tuition savings program. During the campaign, he made a campaign promise not to pursue political ambitions beyond the Treasurer's position. Democrat Robert McCord outspent Ellis significantly in the race. He lost the election to McCord by a significant margin.

== 2010 harassment charges ==
On April 13, 2010, Montgomery County Web editor Marina Bradley accused Ellis of threatening her job. Bradley, who had recently broke off her relationship with Ellis, alleged that Ellis made multiple phone calls to Bradley, including some to her county office, and sent multiple e-mails to her.

Montgomery County commissioners were advised of the accusation in a closed-door meeting. Shortly afterward, solicitor Barry M. Miller confirmed that Ellis violating the agreement restrictions and allegedly tried to contact Bradley again by phone when he learned the commissioners had been briefed. Ellis denies contacting Bradley.

Asked to respond to the allegations in the complaint, Ellis responded by e-mail, stating, "Any comment would have to come from Bev Jackson as I can't violate Marina's confidentiality. Can tell you case was closed without consequence?"

However, Ellis, releasing a letter Monday evening that he sent Saturday to county Chief Operating Officer Robert W. Graf, denies violating the agreement. The letter, in part, states: "As for Ms. Bradley and myself, that case was amicably closed April 1 and never violated by either party. As I told Ms. Jackson, I did mistakenly dial Ms. Bradley on her cell when trying to call someone with a very close number and I dialed too quickly...after four years, it was an old habit. Nothing was said and I immediately hung up when I realized my mistake. That happened one time in a month. I have said nothing to Ms. Bradley nor seen her in or out of the county workplace."

When asked if he would call for the treasurer's resignation, Montgomery County commissioner Joe Hoeffel said he was still looking into the matter. "I'm waiting to get more information from our staff," he said. "I'm very troubled by it."

== Run for chair of Montgomery County Republican Party ==
In May 2018, Ellis started an attempted run for Chairman of the Montgomery County Republican Party. Ellis was opposed by a Liz Preate and eventually withdrew from consideration. The opposition to Ellis according to the Philadelphia Inquirer was based upon the 2008 election scandal and the 2010 Harassment scandal outlined above. In his defense, Ellis stated to the Philadelphia Inquirer that he had "long ago apologized (for his behavior in the scandals), redeemed himself, and had only the party's best interests at heart.".

== SEPTA Board ==
Ellis has served on the SEPTA board on three occasions. First as a Montgomery County appointee from 2001 to 2011, when he resigned in the wake of charges of workplace harassment. Second as an appointee of Republican governor Tom Corbett from 2011 to 2015. His third stint came when appointed to the board by the Republican PA Senate Majority Leader in 2021.

== DVREDF scandal ==
In July 2018 Ellis was listed as a defendant in an action alleging misuse of public funds by the Delaware Valley Regional Economic Development Fund (DVREDF) filed by the Pennsylvania Public Utility Commission for Ellis' alleged role in running the Delaware Valley Regional Economic Development Fund as a member of its board of directors. Ellis, along with other board members, is accused of breach of fiduciary obligations at paragraph 66 of the Complaint. The PUC complaint at paragraph 73 also cites an article by Ryan Briggs of City and State PA which alleges that: ... "[W]hat the [DVREDF] does, besides throw money at consultants and other dubious expenses, is a mystery. Its website hasn't been updated in six years. The phone number listed goes to an answering service inside a property manager's office downtown. And its executive director and board members – all Fumo cronies – dodged multiple press inquiries."

Political offices
Preceded by Michael Marino	Member of the Montgomery County Board of Commissioners; 2003–2008	Succeeded by Bruce Castor
Party political offices
Preceded by Jean Craige Pepper	Republican nominee for Treasurer of Pennsylvania; 2008	Succeeded by Diana Irey-Vaughan
