= John Galloway (American politician) =

American politician

John T. Galloway
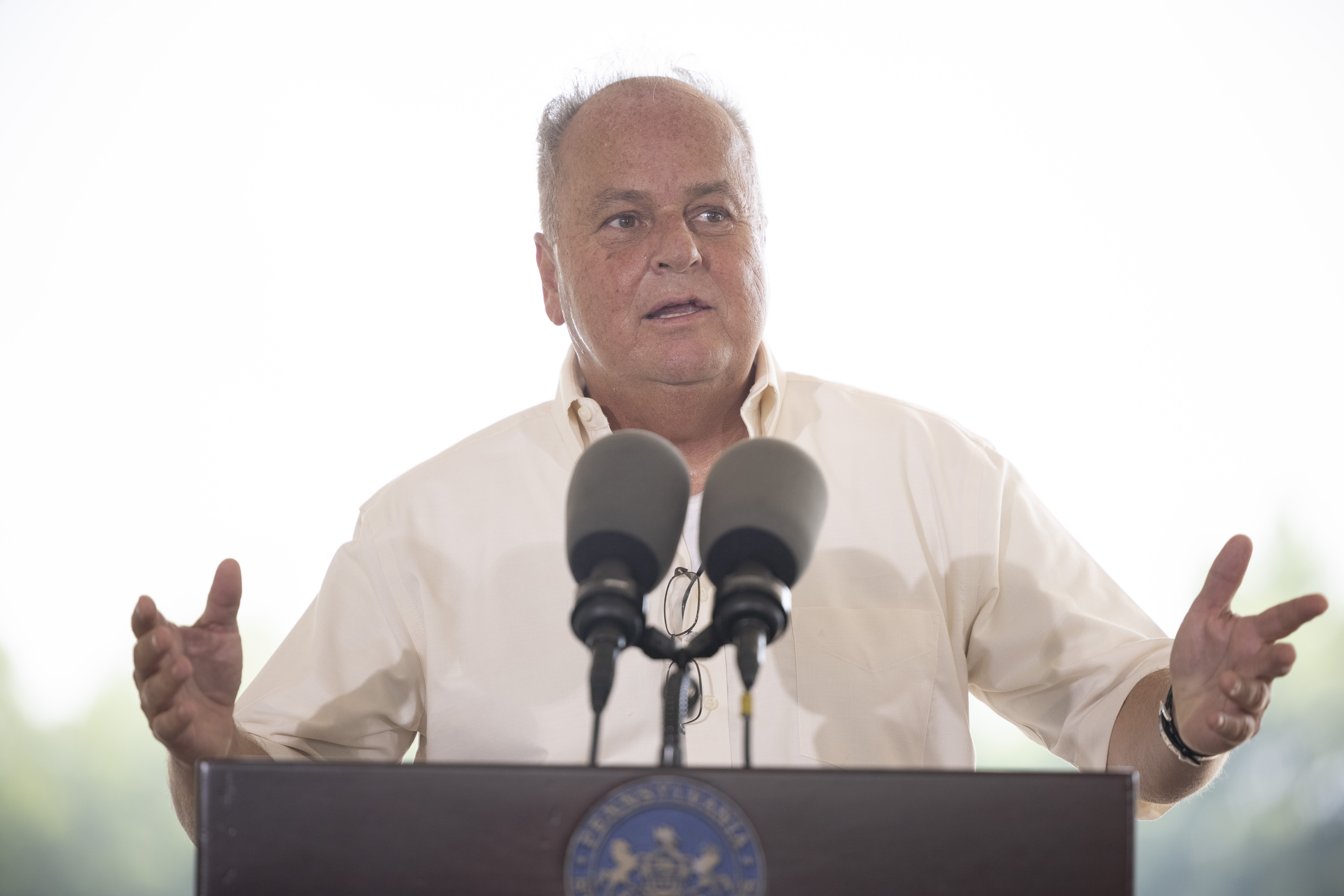

Member of the Pennsylvania House of Representatives from the 140th district
- In office January 2, 2007 – December 14, 2023
- Preceded by: Thomas C. Corrigan
- Succeeded by: Jim Prokopiak

Personal details
- Born: January 4, 1960 (age 66)
- Party: Democratic
- Spouse: Angela
- Children: 1 daughter, Kelley Anne
- Occupation: Certified Global Project Manager
- Website: Official website

John T. Galloway is a former Democratic member of the Pennsylvania House of Representatives, representing the 140th state legislative district from 2007 to 2023. His district included parts of Bucks County.

In November 2023, Galloway was elected as a magisterial judge in Falls Township. Galloway officially resigned on December 14, 2023.

== Early life and career ==
Galloway is a 1977 graduate of Pennsbury High School and a 2001 graduate of the Project Management Institute. He attended Bucks County Community College. He previously served as a member of the Pennsbury School Board and was campaign manager for Bucks County Commissioner Sandra A. Miller.

He was first elected in 2007, defeating Republican Joseph Montone. Galloway served as Secretary on the Aging & Older Adult Services Committee. He was a member of the Appropriations, Finance, Labor Relations, and Veterans Affairs & Emergency Preparedness committees.
