= William F. Johnston =

American politician

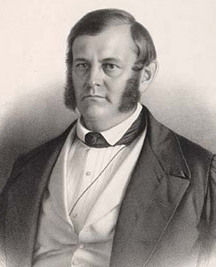

11th Governor of Pennsylvania
- In office July 9, 1848 – January 20, 1852
- Preceded by: Francis R. Shunk
- Succeeded by: William Bigler

Personal details
- Born: William Freame Johnston; November 29, 1808 Greensburg, Pennsylvania, U.S.
- Died: October 25, 1872 (aged 63) Pittsburgh, Pennsylvania, U.S.
- Party: Whig
- Other political affiliations: Democratic Party, Know Nothings
- Spouse: Mary Montieth (m. 1832–1872; his death)

William Freame Johnston (November 29, 1808 – October 25, 1872) was the 11th governor of Pennsylvania, from 1848 to 1852. A lawyer by training, Johnston became district attorney of Westmoreland County at the age of 21 in 1829. He was elected to the Pennsylvania state legislature and switched from the Democratic Party to the Whig Party in 1847 to run for the Pennsylvania Senate.

William F. Johnston was born on November 29, 1808, in Greensburg, Pennsylvania. His parents were Alexander Johnston, an Ulster Scots immigrant from County Tyrone and Elizabeth (Freame) Johnston, whose father was born in Belfast. In 1832, Johnston married Mary Ann Montieth (1814–1898). The couple had five sons and two daughters.

He was named Senate Speaker in 1848 and, upon the resignation of Governor Francis Shunk, assumed the position of governor. Although, because of the transition, Johnston could have delayed the scheduled October elections, he chose to let them proceed and was narrowly elected to the position as a Whig, defeating Democratic candidate Morris Longstreth by only 297 votes. Johnston fought the federal Fugitive Slave Act and its enforcement in Pennsylvania. He lost re-election to Democrat William Bigler in 1851.

In 1856 he was nominated by the northern, anti-slavery faction of the American Party for the office of Vice President, but was later induced to withdraw in favor of William L. Dayton, the Republican nominee.

In 1864, in the midst of the American Civil War, Johnston refused to support the renomination of incumbent president Abraham Lincoln by the Republican Party, instead backing the splinter Radical Democratic Party and their campaign in favor of John C. Frémont, the Republican Party's presidential nominee in 1856 who was now campaigning on a platform calling for a more radical reconstruction than Lincoln endorsed. Johnston would serve as the temporary convention president at the convention where Frémont would be nominated.

Johnston Commons on Penn State University is named for the former governor. His father built and operated the Kingston House in Unity Township, Pennsylvania. It was added to the National Register of Historic Places in 1983.

Party political offices
Preceded by James Irvin	Whig nominee for Governor of Pennsylvania; 1848, 1851	Succeeded by James Pollock
Political offices
Preceded by Francis R. Shunk	Governor of Pennsylvania; 1848–1852	Succeeded by William Bigler
