= Milton Berkes =

American politician

Member of the Pennsylvania House of Representatives from the 140th district
- In office 1969–1974
- Preceded by: District created
- Succeeded by: Theodore Berlin

Member of the Pennsylvania House of Representatives from the Bucks County district
- In office 1967–1968

Personal details
- Born: September 29, 1924 Levittown, Pennsylvania
- Died: April 3, 2015 (aged 90) Langhorne, Pennsylvania
- Party: Democratic

Milton Berkes (September 29, 1924 – April 3, 2015) was an American politician who was a Democratic member of the Pennsylvania House of Representatives. Berkes was active in matters concerning alcohol and drug abuse, propagating for a generally healthy lifestyle. He died in 2015 at a hospice in Langhorne, Pennsylvania.
