= Kathryn S. Fuller =

American lawyer and WWF executive

Kathryn S. Fuller is an American lawyer and business executive. She served as chair of the Ford Foundation from May 2004 until October 2010 and as chair of the Robert Wood Johnson Foundation from January 2021 until January 2025. She has also served as chair and vice chair of the National Museum of Natural History and chair of the Institute at Brown for Environment and Society.

== Biography ==
Fuller graduated from Brown University in 1968 and from the University of Texas School of Law in 1976. She pursued masters studies in Marine, Estuarine and Environmental Science at the University of Maryland and participated in coral reef studies in the Caribbean and wildebeest behavioral studies in Tanzania.

Fuller was the president and chief executive officer of the World Wildlife Fund (WWF) from 1989 until July 2005. She had various responsibilities within WWF previously, including executive vice president, general counsel, and director of its public policy and wildlife trade monitoring programs.

Earlier in her career, she held several positions in the United States Department of Justice, beginning as an attorney in the Office of Legal Counsel where she prepared Attorney General opinions and provided advice to the President and executive agencies on constitutional and federal statutory questions, then helping to establish and later lead the Wildlife and Marine Resources Section of the Environment Division.

She served on the board of the Alcoa Corporation, the Summit Foundation, the Greater Himalayas Foundation and the Lady Bird Johnson Wildflower Center and was for many years a member of the Brown University Corporation. She is the recipient of numerous awards and honorary degrees.

== External lists ==
- Appearances on C-SPAN
