= Philadelphia 3.0 =

- Founded: 2015
- Type: 501(c)(4)
- Purpose: Philadelphia 3.0 is a political organization committed to helping Philadelphia capitalize on its progress and promise. We support independent-minded candidates running for City Council and lead efforts to reform and modernize City Hall.
- Location: Philadelphia, Pennsylvania
- Region served: Philadelphia
- Executive Director: Alison Perelman
- Website: http://www.phila3-0.org/

Philadelphia 3.0 is a 501(c)4 nonprofit political advocacy organization based in Philadelphia, Pennsylvania. Philadelphia 3.0 officially launched March 26, 2015. Alison Perelman is the Executive Director.

Philadelphia 3.0's stated mission is to "support independent-minded candidates running for City Council and lead efforts to reform and modernize City Hall".

Anonymous benefactors fund Philadelphia 3.0. It was conceived by Parkway Corporation executives Joseph and Robert Zuritsky as a means to elect business friendly candidates to Philadelphia City Council.

During the 2015 election cycle, Philadelphia 3.0 supported six candidates for City Council. Three candidates endorsed by Philadelphia 3.0 were elected to office.

In May 2016, twelve local organizations, including Philadelphia 3.0 and the Committee of Seventy joined together to form the “Better Philadelphia Elections Coalition” seeking to create a new Department of Elections administered by a professionally accredited election director appointed by the mayor, with oversight provided by an appointed, non-salaried, and bipartisan Philadelphia Board of Elections.
