= William Bigler =

American politician (1814–1880)

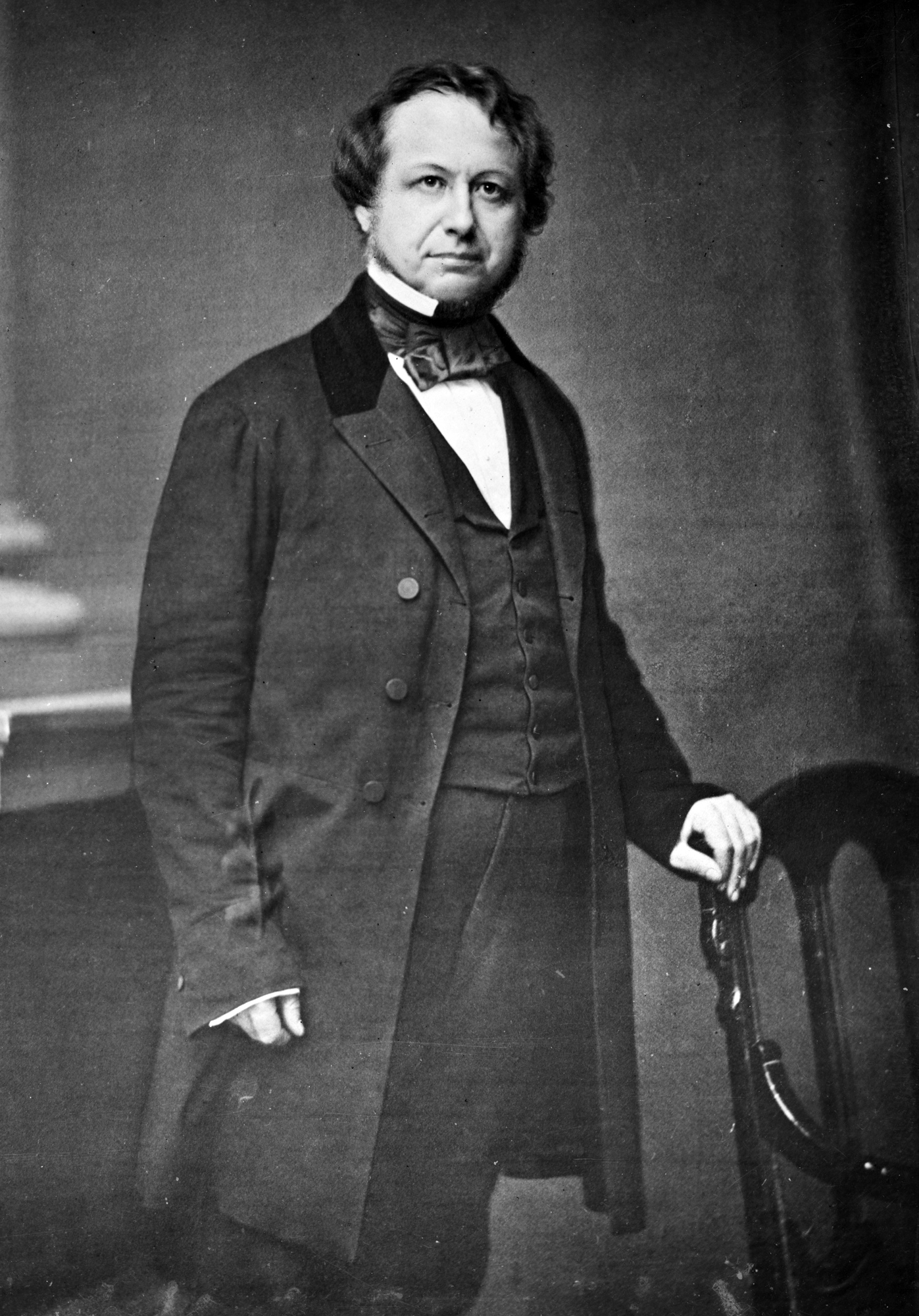

United States Senator from Pennsylvania
- In office January 14, 1856 – March 3, 1861
- Preceded by: James Cooper
- Succeeded by: Edgar Cowan

12th Governor of Pennsylvania
- In office January 20, 1852 – January 16, 1855
- Preceded by: William F. Johnston
- Succeeded by: James Pollock

Member of the Pennsylvania Senate from the 20th district
- In office 1841–1846
- Preceded by: William Stewart
- Succeeded by: Augustus Drum

Personal details
- Born: January 1, 1814 Sherman Valley, Pennsylvania, US
- Died: August 9, 1880 (aged 66) Clearfield, Pennsylvania, US
- Party: Democratic
- Spouse: Maria Jane Reed (m. 1836–1880; his death)
- Profession: Politician, Printer, Lumberman, Railroad President

William Bigler (January 1, 1814 – August 9, 1880) was an American politician from Pennsylvania who served as a Democrat as the 12th governor of Pennsylvania from 1852 to 1855 and as a member of the United States Senate for Pennsylvania from 1856 to 1861. His older brother, John Bigler, was elected governor of California during the same period. As of 2023, he is the last Democratic incumbent to lose reelection as Governor of Pennsylvania.

== Early life and education ==
Bigler was born in Sherman Valley, Pennsylvania, to Jacob and Susan Dock Bigler. He attended public schools and worked as a printer's apprentice, a journalist and as a member of the staff of the Centre County Democrat newspaper under his elder brother John Bigler who later became the governor of California.

== Career ==
In 1833, at the urging of his friends, including future Pennsylvania Governor Andrew Curtin, Bigler founded his own political newspaper, the Clearfield Democrat which supported Jacksonian democracy. In 1836, he married Maria Jane Reed and together they had five children. He sold the newspaper and joined his father-in-law's lumber business as co-partner. Between 1845 and 1850, his lumber business became the largest producer of building supplies on the West branch of the Susquehanna River, earning him the nickname "The Clearfield Raftsman".

He served as a Jackson Democrat member of the Pennsylvania Senate for the 20th district from 1841 to 1846, including as Speaker from 1845 to 1846. He played a key role in the abolition of imprisonment for debt in Pennsylvania and the development of two insane asylums in Philadelphia and Harrisburg. He was a proponent of a central railroad from Philadelphia to Pittsburgh as competition to the B&O Railroad. His efforts resulted in a cross-state line in 1847 which was eventually sold and became the Pennsylvania Railroad. In 1849, he served as Pennsylvania revenue commissioner.

He was elected the 12th Governor of Pennsylvania in 1851, defeating incumbent governor William F. Johnston. He and his brother John were the first brothers to serve as governors of two states simultaneously. He fought vigorously against wildcat banking and vetoed multiple bank charters and bank bills in his time as governor. He lost popularity through his support of the Walker Tariff, the right of southern states to retain slavery, and the Kansas-Nebraska Act, and his enforcement of the 1850 Fugitive Slave Act.

In 1855, he was defeated for re-election in a landslide by James Pollock, the candidate of the newly formed Republican Party.

After leaving the governor's office, he became president of the Philadelphia and Erie Railroad. He was elected to the United States Senate for Pennsylvania in 1856 (the legislature having failed to elect anyone in 1855), and served until 1861.

As a senator, he supported pro-slavery measures to appease the South. He visited Kansas Territory in 1857, and thereafter advocated Kansas statehood under the pro-slavery Lecompton Constitution. He was a delegate to the 1860 Democratic National Convention and opposed the nomination of Stephen A. Douglas.

During the secession crisis in 1861, he supported the compromise proposed by Kentucky Senator John J. Crittenden as a last ditch effort to avoid secession.

He remained active in Pennsylvania politics and served as a delegate to the Pennsylvania constitutional convention in 1873 and as a key organizer of the 1876 Centennial Exposition in Philadelphia.

He died on August 9, 1880, in Clearfield, Pennsylvania, and was interred in Hillcrest Cemetery.

== Legacy ==
Biglerville, Pennsylvania, in Adams County, Pennsylvania, is named after him. Bigler Hall on the University Park campus of Penn State is named after Bigler, as are Bigler Street in Philadelphia, Bigler Township in Clearfield County, and Bigler Avenues in both Clearfield and Northern Cambria, Pennsylvania.

== Gallery ==
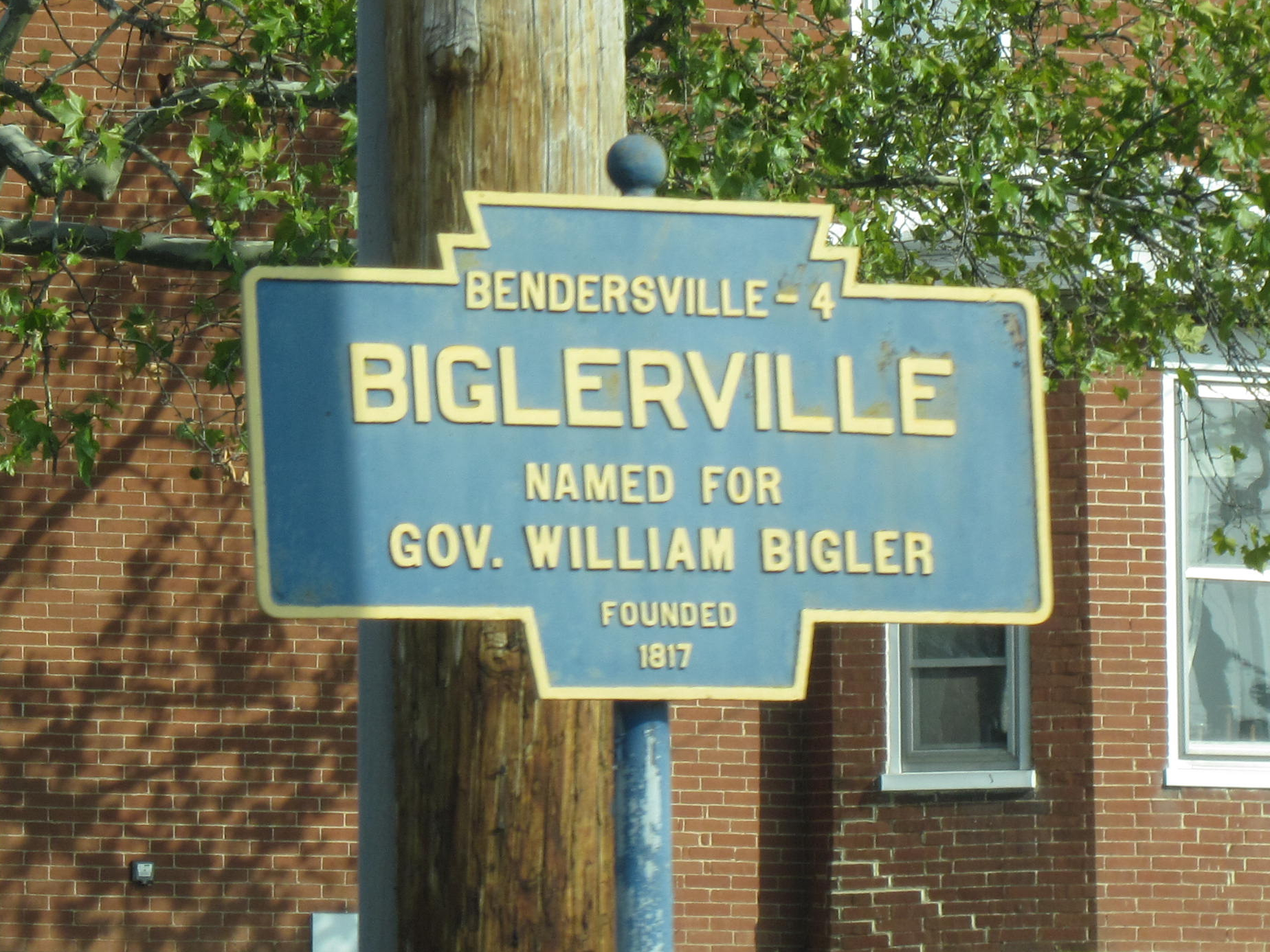
Biglerville, Pennsylvania

Party political offices
Preceded by Morris Longstreth	Democratic nominee for Governor of Pennsylvania; 1851, 1854	Succeeded by William F. Packer
Pennsylvania State Senate
Preceded by William Stewart	Member of the Pennsylvania Senate from the 20th district 1841–1846	Succeeded by Augustus Drum
Political offices
Preceded by William F. Johnston	Governor of Pennsylvania; 1852–1855	Succeeded by James Pollock
U.S. Senate
Preceded by James Cooper	U.S. senator (Class 3) from Pennsylvania; January 14, 1856 – March 3, 1861; Served alongside: Richard Brodhead and Simon Cameron	Succeeded by Edgar Cowan
