= Robin Wiessmann =

American attorney & government official

Robin L. Wiessmann
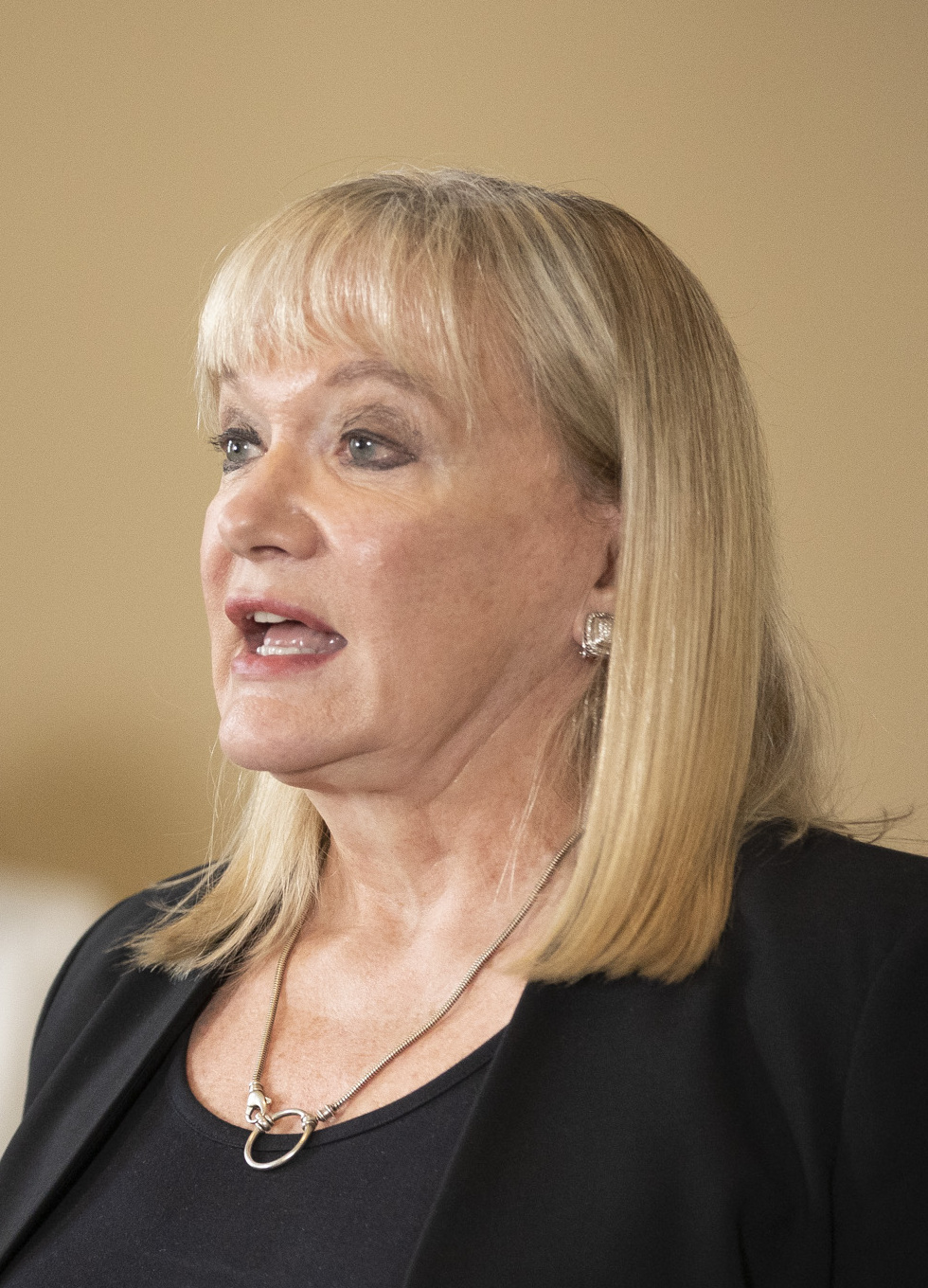
- Wiessmann in 2020

Executive Director and CEO, Pennsylvania Housing Finance Agency
- Incumbent
- Assumed office February 10, 2020
- Governor: Tom Wolf; Josh Shapiro
- Preceded by: Brian Hudson

Secretary of Banking and Securities of Pennsylvania
- In office June 2, 2015 – February 7, 2020
- Governor: Tom Wolf
- Preceded by: Glenn E. Moyer
- Succeeded by: Richard Vague

75th Treasurer of Pennsylvania
- In office April 30, 2007 – January 2, 2009
- Governor: Ed Rendell
- Preceded by: Bob Casey Jr.
- Succeeded by: Rob McCord

Personal details
- Party: Democratic
- Children: 2
- Education: Lafayette College (BA); Rutgers University (JD)

Robin L. Wiessmann is an American attorney and government official serving as the executive director and CEO of the Pennsylvania Housing Finance Agency. Wiessmann previously served as secretary of the Pennsylvania Department of Banking and Securities from 2015 to 2020 and treasurer of Pennsylvania from 2007 to 2009.

== Education ==
Wiessmann earned a Bachelor of Arts degree in government and law from Lafayette College in 1975 and a Juris Doctor from Rutgers Law School in 1978.

== Career ==
Wiessmann is a public finance professional and has helped fund infrastructure, schools, and hospitals throughout her career. Prior to her term as Treasurer of Pennsylvania, served as a deputy director of finance for the city of Philadelphia, where she helped manage the city's debt offerings. She also served as a vice president of public finance at Goldman Sachs.

From 1990 through 1999, Wiessmann was a founding principal and president of Artemis Capital Group. The firm specialized in public finance and was ranked within the top ten municipal underwriters by the end of the decade. Later, she served as a director of public finance for Merrill Lynch, the International City Managers Retirement Corporation (ICMA), and Vantagepoint Funds.

Women Creating Change awarded Wiessmann the Civic Spirit Award in 1996. The National Women Executives in State Government Association awarded her the "Breaking the Glass Ceiling Award" in 1999. In January 2014 the organization Women in Public Finance honored Ms. Wiessmann for her service to the financial industry, and helping represent women in the industry.

Wiessmann endorsed Tom Wolf in the 2014 Pennsylvania gubernatorial election. Following Wolf's election as governor, she was nominated to serve as secretary of the Pennsylvania Department of Banking. Her nomination was confirmed by the Pennsylvania State Senate on June 2, 2015.

On February 10, 2020, Wiessmann was named executive director and CEO of the Pennsylvania Housing Finance Agency. In April 2022, Wiessmann was nominated by President Joe Biden to serve as a member of the board of directors of Amtrak. Her nominated was resubmitted in January 2023 but expired a year later.

== Personal life ==
Wiessmann and her husband live in Bucks County, Pennsylvania. They have two children.

== See also ==
- Pennsylvania Treasurer
