= Rob McCord =

American politician (born 1959)

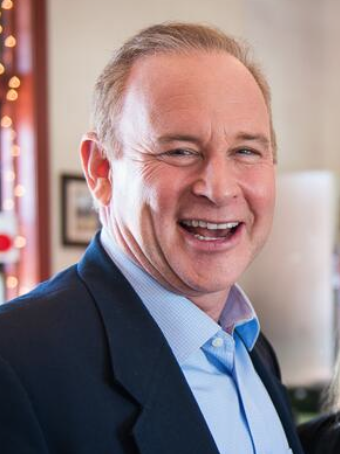

76th Treasurer of Pennsylvania
- In office January 2, 2009 – January 30, 2015
- Governor: Ed Rendell; Tom Corbett; Tom Wolf
- Preceded by: Robin Wiessmann
- Succeeded by: Tim Reese

Personal details
- Born: Robert Maxwell McCord; March 5, 1959 (age 67)
- Party: Democratic
- Education: Harvard University; University of Pennsylvania
- Criminal information
- Criminal charges: Two counts of extortion
- Penalty: 2 and a half years in prison

Robert Maxwell McCord (born March 5, 1959) is an American former politician. A member of the Democratic Party, he served as the Treasurer of Pennsylvania from 2009 to 2015. He was an unsuccessful candidate for the Democratic nomination for Governor of Pennsylvania in the 2014 election.

In January 2015, he announced his resignation as Treasurer of Pennsylvania. On February 17, 2015, McCord pleaded guilty to two counts of extortion.

== Early life and education ==
McCord was born in California to William Maxwell McCord (1930–1992) and Joan Fish McCord (1930–2004), both of whom worked at Stanford University. His older brother is Geoffrey Sayre-McCord, a professor at University of North Carolina at Chapel Hill. His father, a sociologist, and his mother, a criminologist, separated when McCord was 4 years old.

When he was 10, McCord moved to Ardmore, Pennsylvania and later attended Lower Merion High School. After graduating from Lower Merion High, McCord took a year off and then went to Harvard College. At Harvard he did one year abroad and went to Trinity College in Ireland and (back at Harvard) met Leigh Alexandra Jackson, his future wife. McCord also obtained an MBA from the University of Pennsylvania before he moved to Washington, D.C. McCord traveled back to Pennsylvania and set up home in Narberth, less than a mile from Ardmore. After having two children, the McCord family ventured to Bryn Mawr. McCord moved to North Carolina to become a yoga instructor. He lived in Long Branch, New Jersey prior to his arrest and conviction.

== Career ==
From 1994 through 1998 McCord was a senior executive at Safeguard Scientifics. McCord founded and from 1998 to 2007 ran the Eastern Technology Council. McCord was elected the Treasurer of Pennsylvania in 2008. He, his wife, and their sons Jackson and Grant lived in Bryn Mawr.

In 2014, McCord ran for Governor of Pennsylvania in the Democratic primary. He finished third in the May 20 primary, behind nominee Tom Wolf and U.S. Representative Allyson Schwartz.

== Federal trial and conviction ==
On January 29, 2015, McCord announced his resignation, effective February 12. The next day, he announced his resignation effective immediately and said he intended to plead guilty to federal charges of extortion relating to campaign fundraising. On February 2, 2015, McCord was formally charged, and on February 17, 2015, he pled guilty to two counts of extortion. After being made aware that he was being investigated but before he resigned, McCord cooperated as an informant on political donors. McCord's case was delayed after he pled guilty, possibly to assess the usefulness of his cooperation.

On August 28, 2018, McCord was sentenced to 30 months in prison by Judge John E. Jones III.

Party political offices
Preceded by Bob Casey	Democratic nominee for Treasurer of Pennsylvania; 2008, 2012	Succeeded by Joe Torsella
Political offices
Preceded by Robin Wiessmann	Treasurer of Pennsylvania; 2009–2015	Succeeded by Tim Reese
