= 1992 United States House of Representatives elections in Pennsylvania =

- November 3, 1992

All 21 Pennsylvania seats to the United States House of Representatives
	Majority party	Minority party
Party	Democratic	Republican
Last election	11	12
Seats won	11	10
Seat change	Steady	▼2
Popular vote	2,154,372	2,347,441
Percentage	46.93%	51.14%

Democratic hold Democratic gain
Republican hold Republican gain
Democratic
40–50%
50–60%
60–70%
70–80%
80–90%
>90%
Republican
40–50%
50–60%
60–70%
80–90%
>90%

The 1992 United States House of Representatives elections in Pennsylvania were held on November 3, 1992, to elect the twenty-one members of Pennsylvania's delegation to the United States House of Representatives. These were the first elections following redistricting from the 1990 census, which resulted in the state losing two seats. The elections coincided with the presidential election, other elections to the House of Representatives, elections to the United States Senate, and various state and local elections. Primary elections were held April 28, 1992.

== Overview ==
United States House of Representatives elections in Pennsylvania, 1992
Party	Votes	Percentage	Seats Before	Seats After	+/–
Democratic	2,154,372	46.93%	11	11	0
Republican	2,347,441	51.14%	12	10	–2
Independent	48,546	1.06%	0	0	0
Libertarian	20,134	0.44%	0	0	0
Magerman for Congress	5,850	0.13%	0	0	0
Natural Law	4,012	0.09%	0	0	0
New Independent	3,650	0.08%	0	0	0
Socialist Workers	2,966	0.06%	0	0	0
None of Above	2,754	0.06%	0	0	0
Workers League	794	0.02%	0	0	0
Totals	4,590,519	100.00%	23	21	–2

== Match-up summary ==
District	Democratic		Republican		Others		Total		Result
District	Votes	%	Votes	%	Votes	%	Votes	%	Result
District 1	150,172	80.92%	35,419	19.08%	0	0.00%	185,591	100.00%	Democratic hold
District 2	164,355	76.83%	47,906	22.39%	1,666	0.78%	213,927	100.00%	Democratic hold
District 3	130,828	58.94%	86,787	39.10%	4,356	1.96%	221,971	100.00%	Democratic hold
District 4	186,684	78.46%	48,484	20.38%	2,754	1.16%	237,922	100.00%	Democratic hold
District 5	0	0.00%	188,911	100.00%	0	0.00%	188,911	100.00%	Republican hold
District 6	108,312	52.07%	99,694	47.93%	0	0.00%	208,006	100.00%	Democratic hold
District 7	91,623	33.45%	180,648	65.95%	1,627	0.59%	273,898	100.00%	Republican hold
District 8	114,095	45.72%	129,593	51.93%	5,850	2.34%	249,538	100.00%	Republican gain
District 9	0	0.00%	182,406	100.00%	0	0.00%	182,406	100.00%	Republican hold
District 10	0	0.00%	189,414	90.39%	20,134	9.61%	209,548	100.00%	Republican hold
District 11	138,875	67.09%	68,112	32.91%	0	0.00%	206,987	100.00%	Democratic hold
District 12	166,916	100.00%	0	0.00%	0	0.00%	166,916	100.00%	Democratic hold
District 13	127,685	50.27%	126,312	49.73%	0	0.00%	253,997	100.00%	Democratic gain
District 14	165,633	72.32%	61,311	26.77%	2,094	0.91%	229,038	100.00%	Democratic hold
District 15	111,419	52.23%	99,520	46.65%	2,385	1.12%	213,324	100.00%	Democratic gain
District 16	74,741	35.16%	137,823	64.84%	0	0.00%	212,564	100.00%	Republican hold
District 17	65,881	30.49%	150,158	69.51%	0	0.00%	216,039	100.00%	Republican hold
District 18	96,655	38.00%	154,024	60.56%	3,650	1.44%	254,329	100.00%	Republican hold
District 19	74,798	34.38%	98,599	45.31%	44,190	20.31%	217,587	100.00%	Republican hold
District 20	114,898	50.73%	111,591	49.27%	0	0.00%	226,489	100.00%	Democratic hold
District 21	70,802	31.96%	150,729	68.04%	0	0.00%	221,531	100.00%	Republican hold
Total	2,154,372	46.93%	2,347,441	51.14%	88,706	1.93%	4,590,519	100.00%	

Popular vote
Republican	51.14%
Democratic	46.93%
Other	1.93%

House seats
Democratic	52.38%
Republican	47.62%

== District 1 ==
1992 Pennsylvania's 1st congressional district election
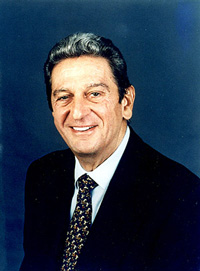

Nominee	Thomas M. Foglietta	Craig Snyder
Party	Democratic	Republican
Popular vote	150,172	35,419
Percentage	80.92%	19.08%
- Foglietta: 50–60% 60–70% 70–80% 80–90% >90% Snyder: 50–60% 60–70% 70–80% 80–90% Tie: 50% No data
U.S. Representative before election
Thomas M. Foglietta
Democratic
Elected U.S. Representative
Thomas M. Foglietta
Democratic

=== Democratic primary ===
==== Candidates ====
===== Nominee =====
- Thomas M. Foglietta, incumbent U.S. Representative

==== Primary results ====
Democratic primary results
Party	Candidate	Votes	%
Democratic	Thomas M. Foglietta (incumbent)	46,919	100.00
Total votes		46,919	100.00

=== Republican primary ===
==== Candidates ====
===== Nominee =====
- Craig Snyder

==== Primary results ====
Republican primary results
Party	Candidate	Votes	%
Republican	Craig Snyder	10,084	100.00
Total votes		10,084	100.00

=== General election ===
Pennsylvania's 1st congressional district, 1992
Party	Candidate	Votes	%
Democratic	Thomas M. Foglietta (incumbent)	150,172	80.92
Republican	Craig Snyder	35,419	19.08
Total votes		185,591	100.00
Democratic hold			

==== By county (Note: Vote totals summed from the precinct data file published by the Pennsylvania Department of State do not match the results officially published by the U.S. House of Representatives.) ====
County	Thomas M. Foglietta Democratic		Craig Snyder Republican		Margin		Total votes cast
County	#	%	#	%	#	%	Total votes cast
Delaware	14,197	57.18%	10,631	42.82%	3,566	14.36%	24,828
Philadelphia	136,038	84.59%	24,785	15.41%	111,253	69.18%	160,823
Totals	150,235	80.92%	35,416	19.08%	114,819	61.85%	185,651

== District 2 ==
1992 Pennsylvania's 2nd congressional district election
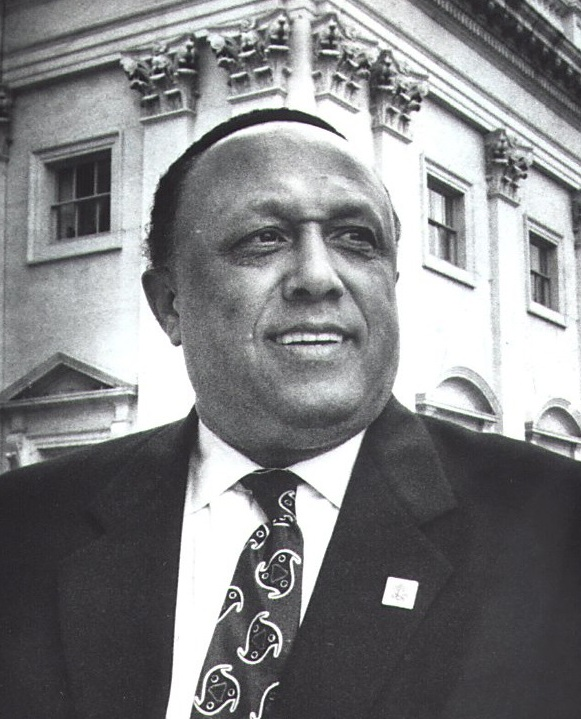

Nominee	Lucien Blackwell	Larry Hollin
Party	Democratic	Republican
Popular vote	164,355	47,906
Percentage	76.83%	22.39%
- Blackwell: 40–50% 50–60% 60–70% 70–80% 80–90% >90% Hollin: 40–50% 50–60% 60–70% 70–80%
U.S. Representative before election
Lucien Blackwell
Democratic
Elected U.S. Representative
Lucien Blackwell
Democratic

=== Democratic primary ===
==== Candidates ====
===== Nominee =====
- Lucien Blackwell, incumbent U.S. Representative

===== Eliminated in primary =====
- C. Delores Tucker

==== Primary results ====
Democratic primary results
Party	Candidate	Votes	%
Democratic	Lucien Blackwell (incumbent)	48,299	53.77
Democratic	C. DeLores Tucker	41,528	46.23
Total votes		89,827	100.00

=== Republican primary ===
==== Candidates ====
===== Nominee =====
- Larry Hollin

==== Primary results ====
Republican primary results
Party	Candidate	Votes	%
Republican	Larry Hollin	9,939	100.00
Total votes		9,939	100.00

=== General election ===
Pennsylvania's 2nd congressional district, 1992
Party	Candidate	Votes	%
Democratic	Lucien Blackwell (incumbent)	164,355	76.83
Republican	Larry Hollin	47,906	22.39
Socialist Workers	Mark Wyatt	1,666	0.78
Total votes		213,927	100.00
Democratic hold			

==== By county ====
County	Lucien Blackwell Democratic		Larry Hollin Republican		Mark Wyatt Socialist Workers		Margin		Total votes cast
County	#	%	#	%	#	%	#	%	Total votes cast
Delaware	7,192	53.71%	6,124	45.74%	74	0.55%	1,068	7.98%	13,390
Philadelphia	157,163	78.64%	41,079	20.56%	1,607	0.80%	116,084	58.09%	199,849
Totals	164,355	77.08%	47,203	22.14%	1,681	0.79%	117,152	54.94%	213,239

== District 3 ==
1992 Pennsylvania's 3rd congressional district election
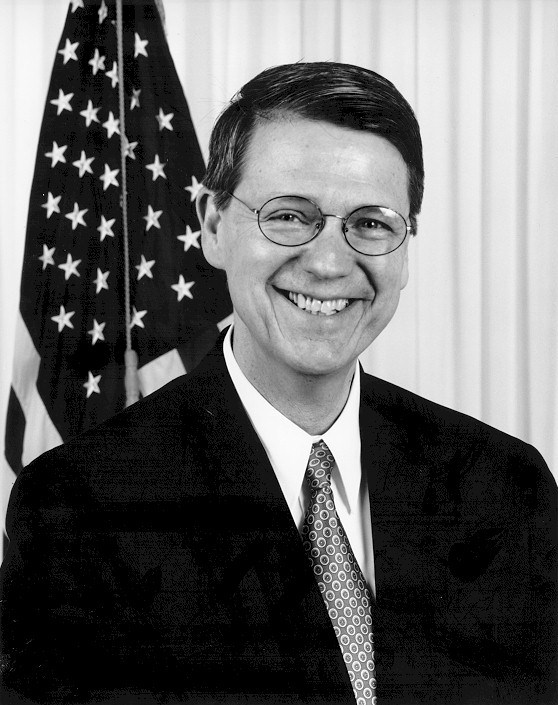

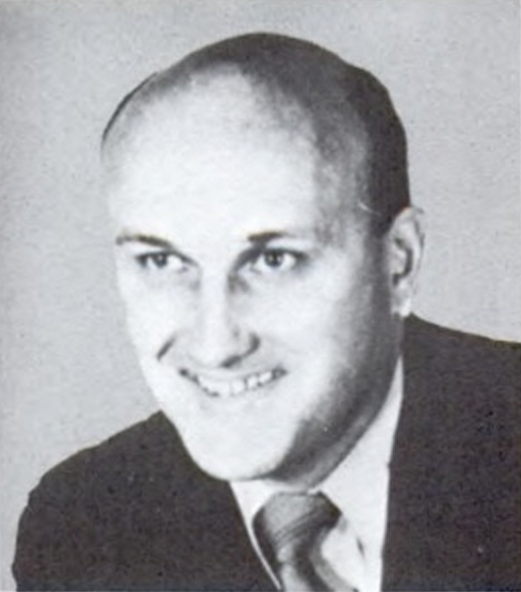
Nominee	Robert Borski	Charles F. Dougherty
Party	Democratic	Republican
Popular vote	130,828	86,787
Percentage	58.94%	39.10%
- Precinct results Borski: 40–50% 50–60% 60–70% 70–80% 80–90% >90% Dougherty: 40–50% 50–60% 60–70% Tie: 40–50%
U.S. Representative before election
Robert Borski
Democratic
Elected U.S. Representative
Robert Borski
Democratic

=== Democratic primary ===
==== Candidates ====
===== Nominee =====
- Robert Borski, incumbent U.S. Representative

==== Primary results ====
Democratic primary results
Party	Candidate	Votes	%
Democratic	Robert Borski (incumbent)	49,267	100.00
Total votes		49,267	100.00

=== Republican primary ===
==== Candidates ====
===== Nominee =====
- Charles F. Dougherty, former U.S. Representative (1979–1983)

==== Primary results ====
Republican primary results
Party	Candidate	Votes	%
Republican	Charles F. Dougherty	31,614	100.00
Total votes		31,614	100.00

=== General election ===
Pennsylvania's 3rd congressional district, 1992
Party	Candidate	Votes	%
Democratic	Robert Borski (incumbent)	130,828	58.94
Republican	Charles F. Dougherty	86,787	39.10
Independent	John J. Hughes	4,356	1.96
Total votes		221,971	100.00
Democratic hold			

==== By county ====
County	Robert Borski Democratic		Charles F. Dougherty Republican		John Hughes Independent		Margin		Total votes cast
County	#	%	#	%	#	%	#	%	Total votes cast
Philadelphia	130,828	58.94%	86,787	39.10%	4,356	1.96%	44,041	19.84%	221,971
Totals	130,828	58.94%	86,787	39.10%	4,356	1.96%	44,041	19.84%	221,971

== District 4 ==
1992 Pennsylvania's 4th congressional district election
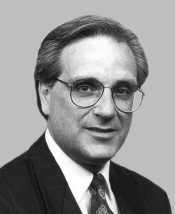

Nominee	Ron Klink	Gordon Johnston
Party	Democratic	Republican
Popular vote	186,684	48,484
Percentage	78.46%	20.38%
- Klink: 50–60% 60–70% 70–80% 80–90% >90% No data
U.S. Representative before election
Joe Kolter
Democratic
Elected U.S. Representative
Ron Klink
Democratic

Television broadcaster Ron Klink defeated incumbent U.S. Representative Joe Kolter in a four-way primary and won the general election, holding the seat for the Democrats.

=== Democratic primary ===
==== Candidates ====
===== Nominee =====
- Ron Klink, television broadcaster and weatherman for KDKA-TV

===== Eliminated in primary =====
- Joe Kolter, incumbent U.S. Representative
- Frank LaGrotta, member of the Pennsylvania House of Representatives (1987–present)
- Mike Veon, member of the Pennsylvania House of Representatives (1985–present)

==== Primary results ====
Democratic primary results
Party	Candidate	Votes	%
Democratic	Ron Klink	45,884	45.39
Democratic	Mike Veon	22,379	22.14
Democratic	Joe Kolter (incumbent)	19,683	19.47
Democratic	Frank LaGrotta	13,153	13.01
Total votes		101,099	100.00

=== Republican primary ===
==== Candidates ====
===== Nominee =====
- Gordon R. Johnston

==== Primary results ====
Republican primary results
Party	Candidate	Votes	%
Republican	Gordon R. Johnston	31,800	100.00
Total votes		31,800	100.00

=== General election ===
Pennsylvania's 4th congressional district, 1992
Party	Candidate	Votes	%
Democratic	Ron Klink	186,684	78.46
Republican	Gordon R. Johnston	48,484	20.38
None of Above	Drew Ley	2,754	1.16
Total votes		237,922	100.00
Democratic hold			

==== By county ====
County	Ron Klink Democratic		Gordon Johnston Republican		Drew Ley Independent		Margin		Total votes cast
County	#	%	#	%	#	%	#	%	Total votes cast
Allegheny (Note: No data provided by the Pennsylvania Department of State.)	0	0.00%	0	0.00%	0	0.00%	0	0.00%	0
Beaver	65,437	80.75%	14,541	17.94%	1,056	1.30%	50,896	62.81%	81,034
Butler	12,679	67.00%	5,615	29.67%	629	3.32%	7,064	37.33%	18,923
Lawrence	30,629	76.58%	8,840	22.10%	527	1.32%	21,789	54.48%	39,996
Westmoreland	51,936	81.71%	11,416	17.96%	208	0.33%	40,520	63.75%	63,560
Totals	160,681	78.95%	40,412	19.86%	2,420	1.19%	120,269	59.10%	203,513

== District 5 ==
1992 Pennsylvania's 5th congressional district election
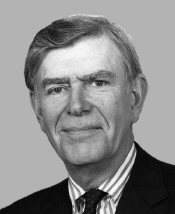
Nominee	William Clinger
Party	Republican
Popular vote	188,911
Percentage	100.00%
- County results Clinger: >90%
U.S. Representative before election
William Clinger
Republican
Elected U.S. Representative
William Clinger
Republican

=== Democratic primary ===
==== Candidates ====
===== Nominee =====
- William Clinger, incumbent U.S. Representative (Note: Redistricted from the 23rd district.) (Note: Won the primary as a write-in.)

==== Primary results ====
Democratic primary results
Party	Candidate	Votes	%
Democratic	William Clinger (write-in)	2,057	100.00
Total votes		2,057	100.00

=== Republican primary ===
==== Candidates ====
===== Nominee =====
- William Clinger, incumbent U.S. Representative

==== Primary results ====
Republican primary results
Party	Candidate	Votes	%
Republican	William Clinger (incumbent)	57,756	100.00
Total votes		57,756	100.00

=== General election ===
Pennsylvania's 5th congressional district, 1992
Party	Candidate	Votes	%
Republican	William Clinger (incumbent)	188,911	100.00
Total votes		188,911	100.00
Republican hold			

==== By county ====
County	William Clinger Republican		Write-in		Margin		Total votes cast
County	#	%	#	%	#	%	Total votes cast
Armstrong	259	100.00%	0	0.00%	259	100.00%	259
Cameron	2,432	100.00%	0	0.00%	2,432	100.00%	2,432
Centre	38,632	100.00%	0	0.00%	38,632	100.00%	38,632
Clarion	13,778	100.00%	0	0.00%	13,778	100.00%	13,778
Clearfield	15	100.00%	0	0.00%	15	100.00%	15
Clinton	10,977	100.00%	0	0.00%	10,977	100.00%	10,977
Crawford	7,147	100.00%	0	0.00%	7,147	100.00%	7,147
Elk	12,572	100.00%	0	0.00%	12,572	100.00%	12,572
Forest	1,874	99.00%	19	1.00%	1,855	98.00%	1,893
Jefferson	16,188	100.00%	0	0.00%	16,188	100.00%	16,188
Lycoming	5,377	99.89%	6	1.11%	5,371	99.78%	5,383
McKean	13,926	100.00%	0	0.00%	13,926	100.00%	13,926
Potter	6,128	100.00%	0	0.00%	6,128	100.00%	6,128
Tioga	13,805	99.99%	1	0.01%	13,804	99.98%	13,806
Union	10,438	100.00%	0	0.00%	10,438	100.00%	10,438
Venango	19,487	99.97%	5	0.03%	19,482	99.94%	19,492
Warren	15,875	100.00%	0	0.00%	15,875	100.00%	15,875
Totals	188,910	99.98%	31	0.02%	188,879	99.96%	188,941

== District 6 ==
1992 Pennsylvania's 6th congressional district election
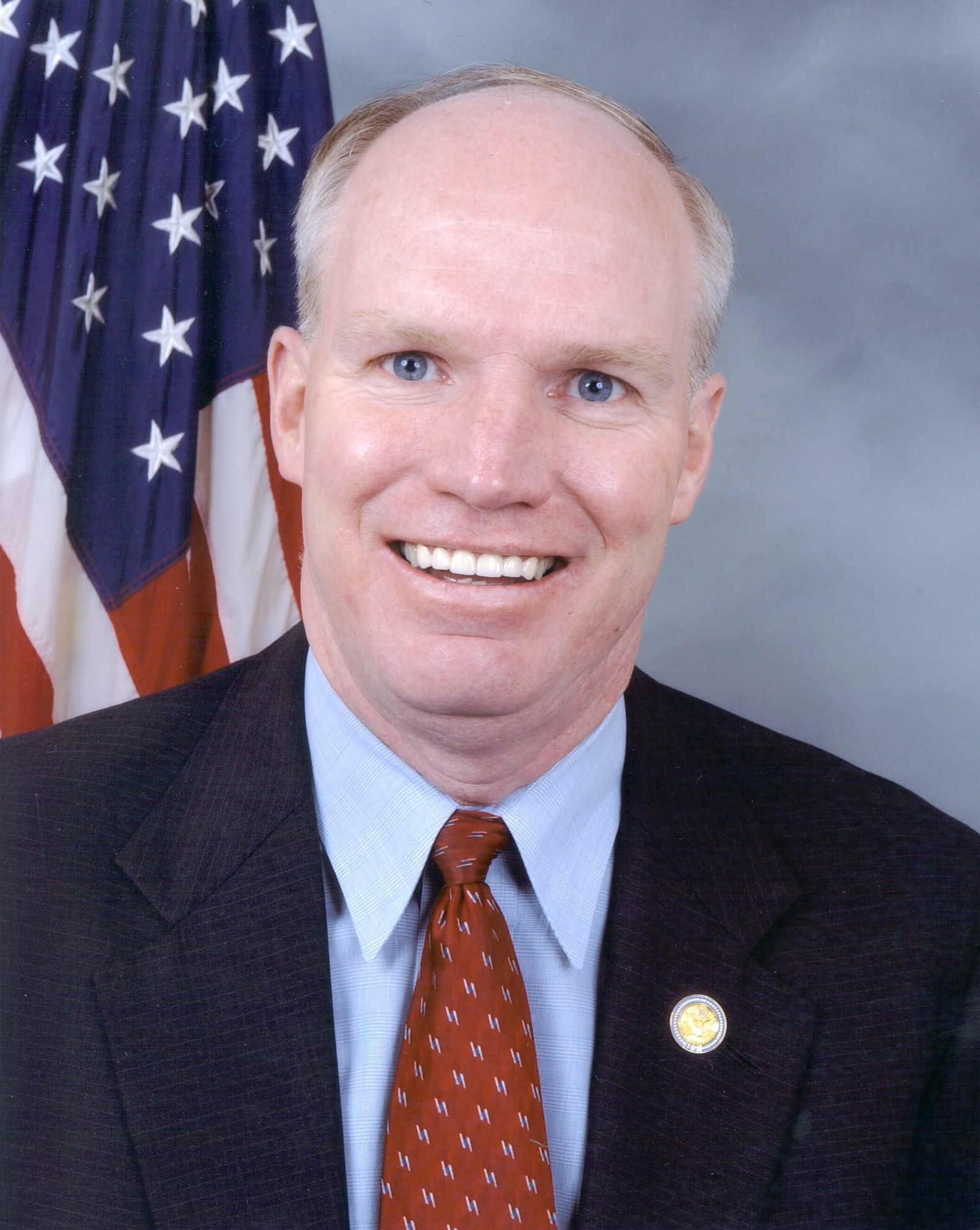

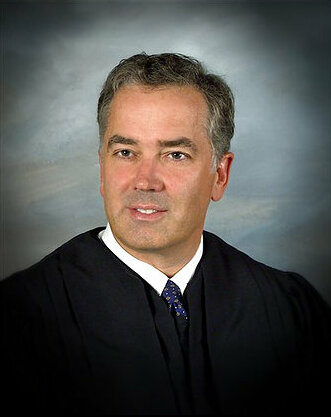
Nominee	Tim Holden	John E. Jones III
Party	Democratic	Republican
Popular vote	108,312	99,694
Percentage	52.07%	47.93%
- Holden: 50–60% 60–70% 70–80% 80–90% >90% Jones: 50–60% 60–70% 70–80%
U.S. Representative before election
Gus Yatron
Democratic
Elected U.S. Representative
Tim Holden
Democratic

Incumbent U.S. Representative Gus Yatron retired, with Tim Holden holding the seat for the Democrats.

=== Democratic primary ===
==== Candidates ====
===== Nominee =====
- Tim Holden, sheriff of Schuylkill County (1985–present)

===== Eliminated in primary =====
- Warren H. Haggerty Jr.
- John A. Reusing

==== Primary results ====
Democratic primary results
Party	Candidate	Votes	%
Democratic	Tim Holden	20,057	39.41
Democratic	Warren H. Haggerty Jr.	16,647	32.71
Democratic	John A. Reusing	14,193	27.89
Total votes		50,897	100.00

=== Republican primary ===
==== Candidates ====
===== Nominee =====
- John E. Jones III, lawyer

===== Eliminated in primary =====
- James J. Gallen
- James P. Troutman

==== Primary results ====
Republican primary results
Party	Candidate	Votes	%
Republican	John E. Jones III	24,201	48.75
Republican	James J. Gallen	14,498	29.20
Republican	James P. Troutman	10,947	22.05
Total votes		49,646	100.00

=== General election ===
Pennsylvania's 6th congressional district, 1992
Party	Candidate	Votes	%
Democratic	Tim Holden	108,312	52.07
Republican	John E. Jones III	99,694	47.93
Total votes		208,006	100.00
Democratic hold			

==== By county ====
County	Tim Holden Democratic		John Jones III Republican		Margin		Total votes cast
County	#	%	#	%	#	%	Total votes cast
Berks	60,791	49.43%	62,197	50.57%	–1,406	–1.14%	122,988
Montgomery	4,040	54.45%	3,380	45.55%	660	8.89%	7,420
Northumberland	5,878	37.91%	9,626	62.09%	–3,748	–24.17%	15,504
Schuylkill	37,810	60.75%	24,433	39.25%	13,377	21.49%	62,243
Totals	108,519	52.13%	99,636	47.87%	8,883	4.27%	208,155

== District 7 ==
1992 Pennsylvania's 7th congressional district election
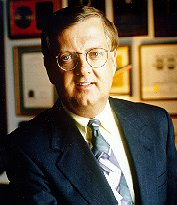

Nominee	Curt Weldon	Frank Daly
Party	Republican	Democratic
Popular vote	180,648	91,623
Percentage	65.95%	33.45%
- Weldon: 40–50% 50–60% 60–70% 70–80% 80–90% Daly: 40–50% 50–60% 60–70% Tie: 40–50% No data
U.S. Representative before election
Curt Weldon
Republican
Elected U.S. Representative
Curt Weldon
Republican

The 1990 redistricting cycle resulted in the combining of the existing 5th and 7th congressional districts. The 5th district representative, Dick Schulze, opted to retire. Curt Weldon, the 7th district representative, ran for reelection.

=== Democratic primary ===
==== Candidates ====
===== Nominee =====
- Frank Daly

===== Eliminated in primary =====
- Donald Tony Hadley
- John Innelli

==== Primary results ====
Democratic primary results
Party	Candidate	Votes	%
Democratic	Frank Daly	16,191	52.18
Democratic	Donald Tony Hadley	12,123	39.07
Democratic	John Innelli	2,716	8.75
Total votes		31,030	100.00

=== Republican primary ===
==== Candidates ====
===== Nominee =====
- Curt Weldon, incumbent U.S. Representative

===== Eliminated in primary =====
- Fiorindo Vagnozzi

==== Primary results ====
Republican primary results
Party	Candidate	Votes	%
Republican	Curt Weldon (incumbent)	73,304	77.39
Republican	Fiorindo Vagnozzi	21,413	22.61
Total votes		94,717	100.00

=== General election ===
Pennsylvania's 7th congressional district, 1992
Party	Candidate	Votes	%
Republican	Curt Weldon (incumbent)	180,648	65.95
Democratic	Frank Daly	91,623	33.45
Natural Law	William Alan Hickman	1,627	0.59
Total votes		273,898	100.00
Republican hold			

==== By county ====
County	Curt Weldon Republican		Frank Daly Democratic		William Hickman Natural Law		Margin		Total votes cast
County	#	%	#	%	#	%	#	%	Total votes cast
Chester	31,988	66.44%	15,200	31.57%	958	1.99%	16,788	34.87%	48,146
Delaware	139,884	66.23%	70,737	33.49%	601	0.28%	69,147	32.74%	211,222
Montgomery	8,745	60.86%	5,554	38.65%	70	0.49%	3,191	22.21%	14,369
Totals	180,617	65.98%	91,491	33.42%	1,629	0.60%	89,126	32.56%	273,737

== District 8 ==
1992 Pennsylvania's 8th congressional district election
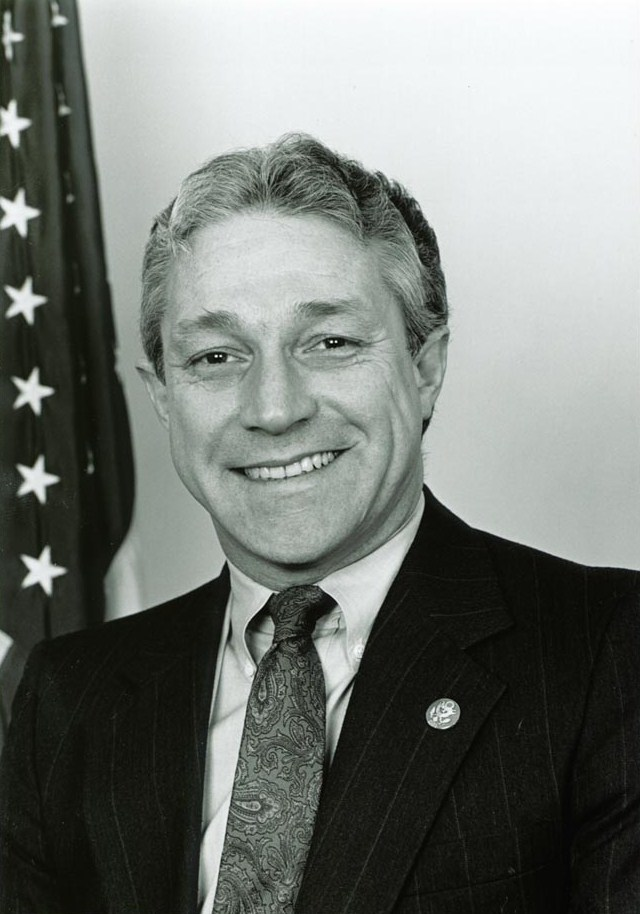

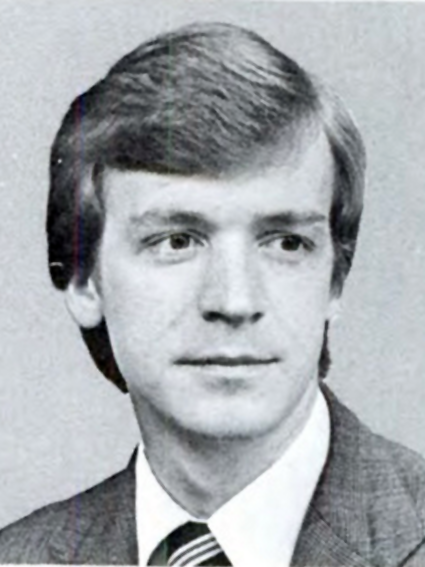
Nominee	Jim Greenwood	Peter H. Kostmayer
Party	Republican	Democratic
Popular vote	129,593	114,095
Percentage	51.93%	45.72%
- Greenwood: 40–50% 50–60% 60–70% 70–80% Kostmayer: 40–50% 50–60% 60–70% 70–80% 80–90% Tie: 40–50%
U.S. Representative before election
Peter H. Kostmayer
Democratic
Elected U.S. Representative
Jim Greenwood
Republican

Incumbent U.S. Representative Peter H. Kostmayer, a Democrat, lost reelection to Republican State Senator Jim Greenwood.

=== Democratic primary ===
==== Candidates ====
===== Nominee =====
- Peter H. Kostmayer, incumbent U.S. Representative

===== Eliminated in primary =====
- Joe Hayes

==== Primary results ====
Democratic primary results
Party	Candidate	Votes	%
Democratic	Peter H. Kostmayer (incumbent)	29,442	75.51
Democratic	Joe Hayes	9,547	24.49
Total votes		38,989	100.00

=== Republican primary ===
==== Candidates ====
===== Nominee =====
- Jim Greenwood, member of the Pennsylvania State Senate (1987–present) and Pennsylvania House of Representatives (1981–1986)

===== Eliminated in primary =====
- Joseph P. Schiaffino

==== Primary results ====
Republican primary results
Party	Candidate	Votes	%
Republican	Jim Greenwood	36,394	79.35
Republican	Joseph P. Schiaffino	9,472	20.65
Total votes		45,866	100.00

=== General election ===
Pennsylvania's 8th congressional district, 1992
Party	Candidate	Votes	%
Republican	Jim Greenwood	129,593	51.93
Democratic	Peter H. Kostmayer (incumbent)	114,095	45.72
Magerman for Congress	William H. Magerman	5,850	2.34
Total votes		249,538	100.00
Republican gain from Democratic			

==== By county ====
County	Jim Greenwood Republican		Peter H. Kostmayer Democratic		William Magerman Independent		Margin		Total votes cast
County	#	%	#	%	#	%	#	%	Total votes cast
Bucks	123,462	51.61%	110,107	46.03%	5,648	2.36%	13,355	5.58%	239,217
Montgomery	6,131	59.40%	3,988	38.64%	202	1.96%	2,143	20.76%	10,321
Totals	129,593	51.93%	114,095	45.72%	5,850	2.34%	15,498	6.21%	249,538

== District 9 ==
1992 Pennsylvania's 9th congressional district election
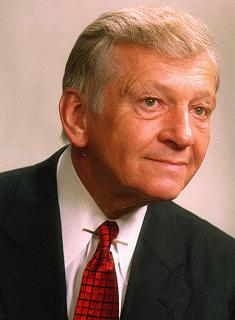
Nominee	Bud Shuster
Party	Republican
Popular vote	182,406
Percentage	100.00%
- County results Shuster: >90%
U.S. Representative before election
Bud Shuster
Republican
Elected U.S. Representative
Bud Shuster
Republican

=== Democratic primary ===
==== Candidates ====
===== Nominee =====
- Bud Shuster, incumbent U.S. Representative

==== Primary results ====
Democratic primary results
Party	Candidate	Votes	%
Democratic	Bud Shuster (write-in)	4,164	100.00
Total votes		4,164	100.00

=== Republican primary ===
==== Candidates ====
===== Nominee =====
- Bud Shuster, incumbent U.S. Representative

==== Primary results ====
Republican primary results
Party	Candidate	Votes	%
Republican	Bud Shuster (incumbent)	53,546	100.00
Total votes		53,546	100.00

=== General election ===
Pennsylvania's 9th congressional district, 1992
Party	Candidate	Votes	%
Republican	Bud Shuster (incumbent)	182,406	100.00
Total votes		182,406	100.00
Republican hold			

==== By county ====
County	Bud Shuster Republican		Write-in		Margin		Total votes cast
County	#	%	#	%	#	%	Total votes cast
Bedford	16,584	100.00%	0	0.00%	16,584	100.00%	16,584
Blair	40,149	100.00%	0	0.00%	40,149	100.00%	40,149
Centre	5,263	100.00%	0	0.00%	5,263	100.00%	5,263
Clearfield	27,477	100.00%	0	0.00%	27,477	100.00%	27,477
Franklin	39,411	100.00%	0	0.00%	39,411	100.00%	39,411
Fulton	4,505	100.00%	0	0.00%	4,505	100.00%	4,505
Huntingdon	13,720	100.00%	0	0.00%	13,720	100.00%	13,720
Juniata	7,574	100.00%	0	0.00%	7,574	100.00%	7,574
Mifflin	12,681	100.00%	0	0.00%	12,681	100.00%	12,681
Perry	3,916	99.82%	7	0.18%	3,909	99.64%	3,923
Snyder	11,097	100.00%	0	0.00%	11,097	100.00%	11,097
Totals	182,377	100.00%	7	0.00%	182,370	100.00%	182,384

== District 10 ==
1992 Pennsylvania's 10th congressional district election
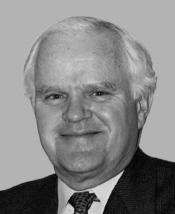

Nominee	Joseph M. McDade	Albert A. Smith
Party	Republican	Libertarian
Popular vote	189,414	20,134
Percentage	90.39%	9.61%
- McDade: 60–70% 70–80% 80–90% >90%
U.S. Representative before election
Joseph M. McDade
Republican
Elected U.S. Representative
Joseph M. McDade
Republican

=== Democratic primary ===
==== Candidates ====
===== Nominee =====
- Joseph M. McDade, incumbent U.S. Representative

==== Primary results ====
Democratic primary results
Party	Candidate	Votes	%
Democratic	Joseph M. McDade (write-in)	1,641	100.00
Total votes		1,641	100.00

=== Republican primary ===
==== Candidates ====
===== Nominee =====
- Joseph M. McDade, incumbent U.S. Representative

==== Primary results ====
Republican primary results
Party	Candidate	Votes	%
Republican	Joseph M. McDade (incumbent)	40,184	100.00
Total votes		40,184	100.00

=== General election ===
Pennsylvania's 10th congressional district, 1992
Party	Candidate	Votes	%
Republican	Joseph M. McDade (incumbent)	189,414	90.39
Libertarian	Albert A. Smith	20,134	9.61
Total votes		209,548	100.00
Republican hold			

==== By county ====
County	Joseph M. McDade Republican		Albert Smith Libertarian		Write-in		Margin		Total votes cast
County	#	%	#	%	#	%	#	%	Total votes cast
Bradford	18,702	86.86%	2,828	13.14%	0	0.00%	15,874	73.73%	21,530
Lackawanna	50,000	90.30%	5,369	9.70%	0	0.00%	44,631	80.61%	55,369
Lycoming	28,950	88.13%	3,873	11.79%	25	0.08%	25,077	76.34%	32,848
Monroe	12,507	88.85%	1,569	11.15%	0	0.00%	10,938	77.71%	14,076
Pike	10,839	91.03%	1,068	8.97%	0	0.00%	9,771	82.06%	11,907
Sullivan	2,589	88.51%	336	11.49%	0	0.00%	2,253	77.03%	2,925
Susquehanna	13,729	86.01%	2,234	13.99%	0	0.00%	11,495	72.01%	15,963
Wayne	13,159	90.04%	1,447	9.90%	8	0.05%	11,712	80.14%	14,614
Wyoming	8,994	86.44%	1,378	13.24%	33	0.32%	7,616	73.20%	10,405
Totals	159,469	88.77%	20,102	11.19%	66	0.04%	139,367	77.58%	179,637

== District 11 ==
1992 Pennsylvania's 11th congressional district election
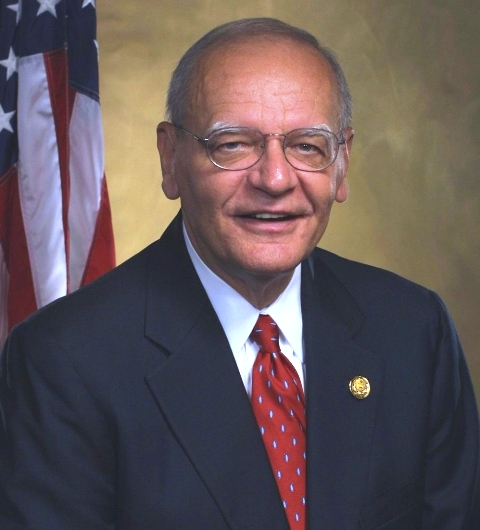

Nominee	Paul Kanjorski	Michael Fescina
Party	Democratic	Republican
Popular vote	138,875	68,112
Percentage	67.09%	32.91%
- Kanjorski: 50–60% 60–70% 70–80% 80–90% >90% Fescina: 50–60%
U.S. Representative before election
Paul Kanjorski
Democratic
Elected U.S. Representative
Paul Kanjorski
Democratic

=== Democratic primary ===
==== Candidates ====
===== Nominee =====
- Paul Kanjorski, incumbent U.S. Representative

==== Primary results ====
Democratic primary results
Party	Candidate	Votes	%
Democratic	Paul Kanjorski (incumbent)	47,614	100.00
Total votes		47,614	100.00

=== Republican primary ===
==== Candidates ====
===== Nominee =====
- Michael A. Fescina

===== Eliminated in primary =====
- Jurij A. Podolak

==== Primary results ====
Republican primary results
Party	Candidate	Votes	%
Republican	Michael A. Fescina	19,411	63.57
Republican	Jurij A. Podolak	11,122	36.43
Total votes		30,533	100.00

=== General election ===
Pennsylvania's 11th congressional district, 1992
Party	Candidate	Votes	%
Democratic	Paul Kanjorski (incumbent)	138,875	67.09
Republican	Michael A. Fescina	68,112	32.91
Total votes		206,987	100.00
Democratic hold			

==== By county ====
County	Paul Kanjorski Democratic		Michael Fescina Republican		Write-in		Margin		Total votes cast
County	#	%	#	%	#	%	#	%	Total votes cast
Carbon	13,626	70.40%	5,728	29.60%	0	0.00%	7,898	40.81%	19,354
Columbia	15,640	67.08%	7,674	32.91%	2	0.01%	7,966	34.17%	23,316
Luzerne	81,014	68.49%	37,275	31.51%	0	0.00%	43,739	36.98%	118,289
Monroe	10,908	57.94%	7,918	42.06%	0	0.00%	2,990	15.88%	18,826
Montour	4,256	65.44%	2,248	34.56%	0	0.00%	2,008	30.87%	6,504
Northumberland	12,752	72.57%	4,821	27.43%	0	0.00%	7,931	45.13%	17,573
Totals	138,196	67.79%	65,664	32.21%	2	0.00%	72,532	35.58%	203,862

== District 12 ==
1992 Pennsylvania's 12th congressional district election
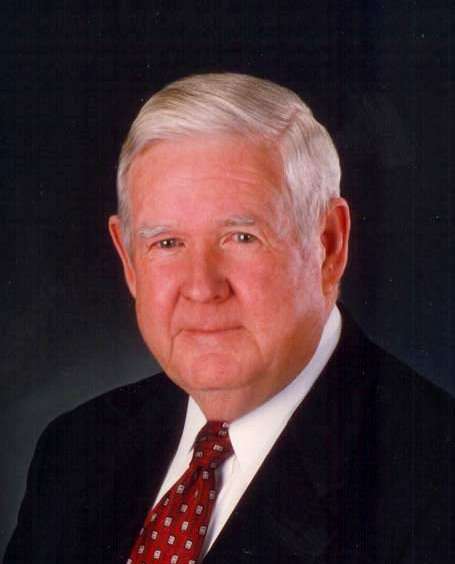
Nominee	John Murtha
Party	Democratic
Popular vote	166,916
Percentage	100.00%
- County results Murtha: >90%
U.S. Representative before election
John Murtha
Democratic
Elected U.S. Representative
John Murtha
Democratic

=== Democratic primary ===
==== Candidates ====
===== Nominee =====
- John Murtha, incumbent U.S. Representative

==== Primary results ====
Democratic primary results
Party	Candidate	Votes	%
Democratic	John Murtha (incumbent)	65,124	100.00
Total votes		65,124	100.00

=== General election ===
Pennsylvania's 12th congressional district, 1992
Party	Candidate	Votes	%
Democratic	John Murtha (incumbent)	166,916	100.00
Total votes		166,916	100.00
Democratic hold			

==== By county ====
County	John Murtha Democratic		Write-in		Margin		Total votes cast
County	#	%	#	%	#	%	Total votes cast
Armstrong	22,583	100.00%	0	0.00%	22,583	100.00%	22,583
Cambria	54,079	100.00%	0	0.00%	54,079	100.00%	54,079
Clarion	357	100.00%	0	0.00%	357	100.00%	357
Fayette	11,641	100.00%	0	0.00%	11,641	100.00%	11,641
Indiana	26,606	100.00%	0	0.00%	26,606	100.00%	26,606
Somerset	24,508	97.84%	542	2.16%	23,966	95.67%	25,050
Westmoreland	27,141	100.00%	0	0.00%	27,141	100.00%	27,141
Totals	166,915	99.68%	542	0.32%	166,373	99.35%	167,457

== District 13 ==
1992 Pennsylvania's 13th congressional district election
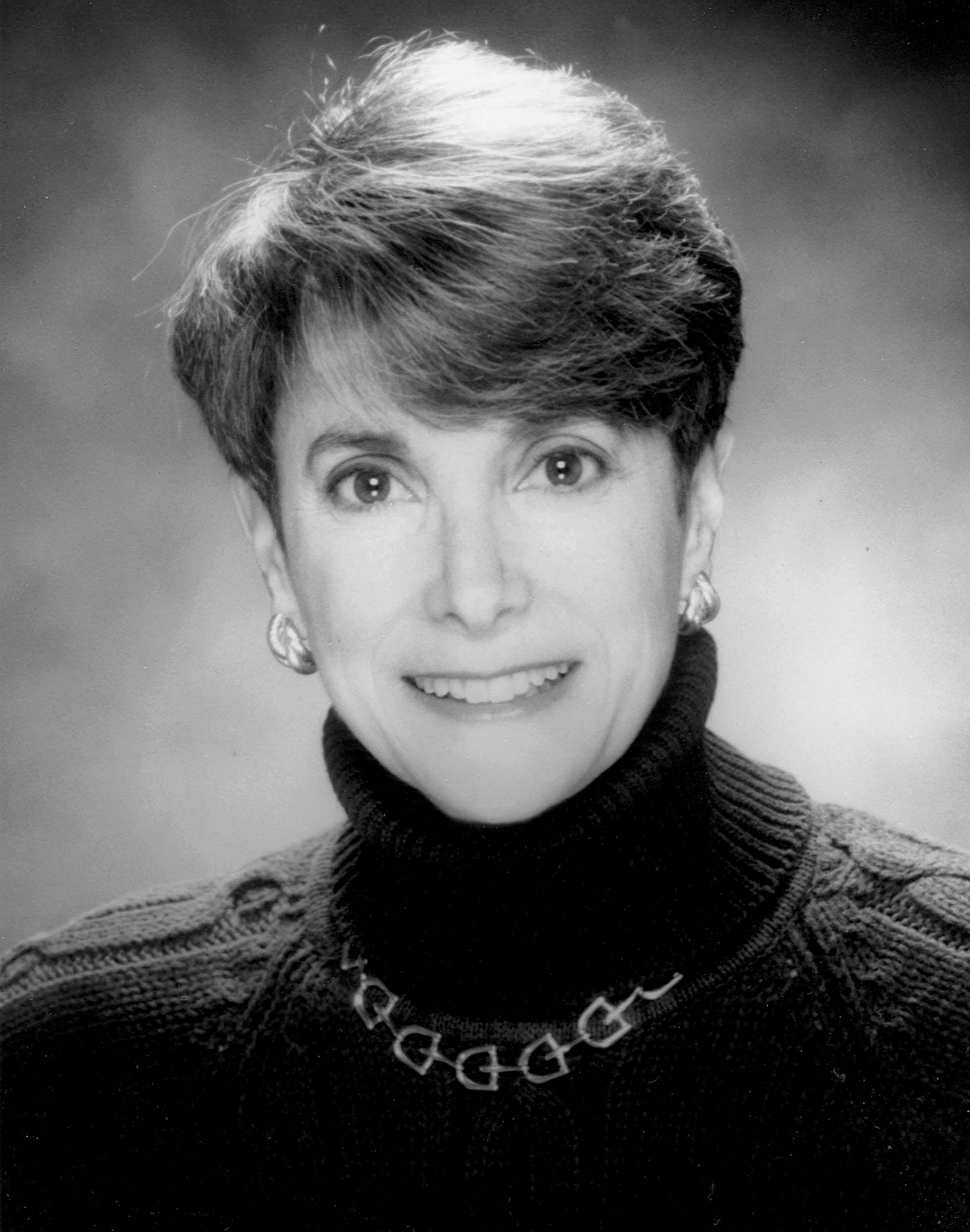

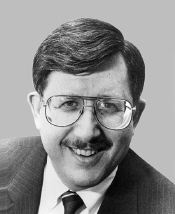
Nominee	Marjorie Margolies-Mezvinsky	Jon D. Fox
Party	Democratic	Republican
Popular vote	127,685	126,312
Percentage	50.27%	49.73%
- Precinct results Margolies-Mezvinsky: 40–50% 50–60% 60–70% 70–80% 80–90% >90% Fox: 40–50% 50–60% 60–70% 70–80%
U.S. Representative before election
Lawrence Coughlin
Republican
Elected U.S. Representative
Marjorie Margolies-Mezvinsky
Democratic

Incumbent U.S. Representative Lawrence Coughlin, a Republican, retired. Journalist Marjorie Margolies-Mezvinsky flipped the seat for the Democrats.

=== Democratic primary ===
==== Candidates ====
===== Nominee =====
- Marjorie Margolies-Mezvinsky, broadcast journalist and spouse of former U.S. Representative Edward Mezvinsky

===== Eliminated in primary =====
- Bernard Tomkin

==== Primary results ====
Democratic primary results
Party	Candidate	Votes	%
Democratic	Marjorie Margolies-Mezvinsky	28,095	79.34
Democratic	Bernard Tomkin	7,318	20.66
Total votes		35,413	100.00

=== Republican primary ===
==== Candidates ====
===== Nominee =====
- Jon D. Fox, member of the Pennsylvania House of Representatives (1985–present)

===== Eliminated in primary =====
- Susan Boyer
- William W. Evans

==== Primary results ====
Republican primary results
Party	Candidate	Votes	%
Republican	Jon D. Fox	39,144	52.35
Republican	William W. Evans	19,902	26.62
Republican	Susan Boyer	15,725	21.03
Total votes		74,771	100.00

=== General election ===
Pennsylvania's 13th congressional district, 1992
Party	Candidate	Votes	%
Democratic	Marjorie Margolies-Mezvinsky	127,685	50.27
Republican	Jon D. Fox	126,312	49.73
Total votes		253,997	100.00
Democratic gain from Republican			

==== By county ====
County	Marjorie Margolies-Mezvinsky Democratic		Jon D. Fox Republican		Write-in		Margin		Total votes cast
County	#	%	#	%	#	%	#	%	Total votes cast
Montgomery	125,291	49.59%	123,896	49.04%	3,464	1.37%	1,395	0.55%	252,651
Totals	125,291	49.59%	123,896	49.04%	3,464	1.37%	1,395	0.55%	252,651

== District 14 ==
1992 Pennsylvania's 14th congressional district election
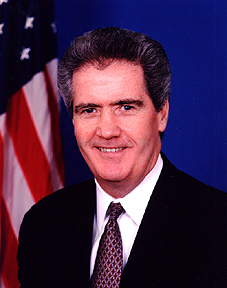

Nominee	William J. Coyne	Byron W. King
Party	Democratic	Republican
Popular vote	165,633	61,311
Percentage	72.32%	26.77%
- Coyne: 40–50% 50–60% 60–70% 70–80% 80–90% >90% King: 50–60% 60–70% 70–80% Tie: 40–50% No data
U.S. Representative before election
William J. Coyne
Democratic
Elected U.S. Representative
William J. Coyne
Democratic

=== Democratic primary ===
==== Candidates ====
===== Nominee =====
- William J. Coyne, incumbent U.S. Representative

===== Eliminated in primary =====
- Al Guttman

==== Primary results ====
Democratic primary results
Party	Candidate	Votes	%
Democratic	William J. Coyne (incumbent)	70,162	76.46
Democratic	Al Guttman	21,607	23.54
Total votes		91,769	100.00

=== Republican primary ===
==== Candidates ====
===== Nominee =====
- Byron W. King

==== Primary results ====
Republican primary results
Party	Candidate	Votes	%
Republican	Byron W. King	19,973	100.00
Total votes		19,973	100.00

=== General election ===
Pennsylvania's 14th congressional district, 1992
Party	Candidate	Votes	%
Democratic	William J. Coyne (incumbent)	165,633	72.32
Republican	Byron W. King	61,311	26.77
Socialist Workers	Joanne S. Kuniansky	1,300	0.57
Workers League	Paul Scherrer	794	0.35
Total votes		229,038	100.00
Democratic hold			

==== By county ====
County	William J. Coyne Democratic		Byron King Republican		Joanne Kuniansky Socialist Workers		Paul Scherrer Workers League		Margin		Total votes cast
County	#	%	#	%	#	%	#	%	#	%	Total votes cast
Allegheny	165,516	72.31%	61,275	26.77%	1,300	0.57%	794	0.35%	104,241	45.54%	228,885
Totals	165,516	72.31%	61,275	26.77%	1,300	0.57%	794	0.35%	104,241	45.54%	228,885

== District 15 ==
1992 Pennsylvania's 15th congressional district election
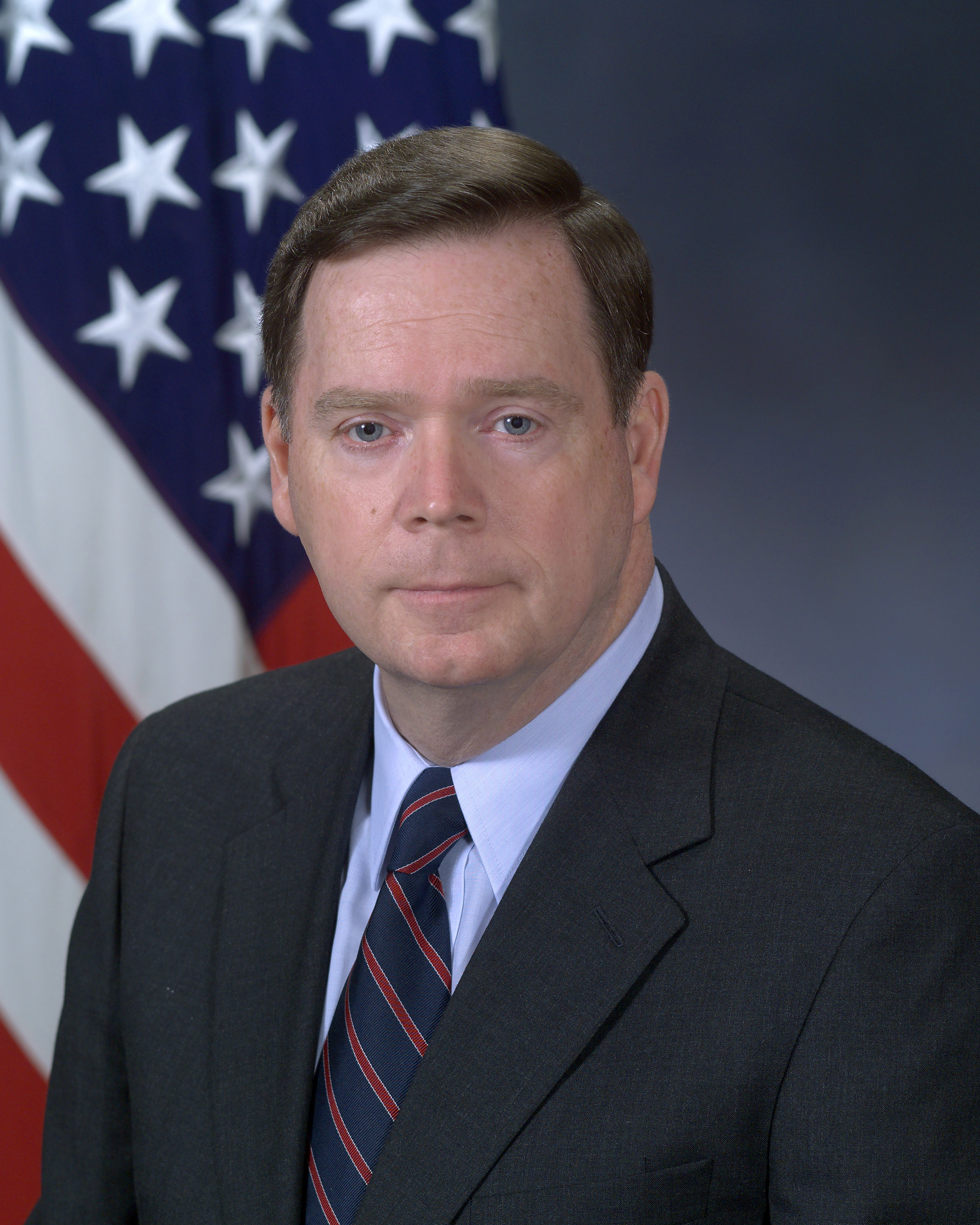

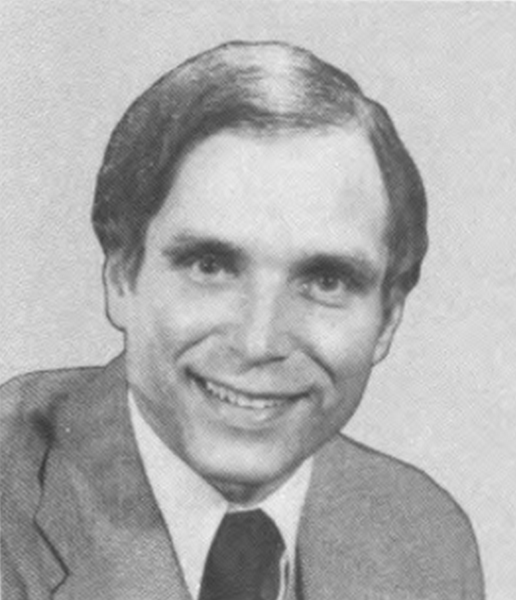
Nominee	Paul McHale	Donald L. Ritter
Party	Democratic	Republican
Popular vote	111,419	99,520
Percentage	52.23%	46.65%
- McHale: 40–50% 50–60% 60–70% 70–80% Ritter: 40–50% 50–60% 60–70% Tie: 40–50%
U.S. Representative before election
Donald L. Ritter
Republican
Elected U.S. Representative
Paul McHale
Democratic

Incumbent U.S. Representative Donald L. Ritter, a Republican, lost reelection to State Representative Paul McHale, a Democrat.

=== Democratic primary ===
==== Candidates ====
===== Nominee =====
- Paul McHale, member of the Pennsylvania House of Representatives (1983–1991)

===== Eliminated in primary =====
- Dave Clark

==== Primary results ====
Democratic primary results
Party	Candidate	Votes	%
Democratic	Paul McHale	30,818	73.89
Democratic	Dave Clark	10,891	26.11
Total votes		41,709	100.00

=== Republican primary ===
==== Candidates ====
===== Nominee =====
- Donald L. Ritter, incumbent U.S. Representative

==== Primary results ====
Republican primary results
Party	Candidate	Votes	%
Republican	Donald L. Ritter (incumbent)	29,507	100.00
Total votes		29,507	100.00

=== General election ===
Pennsylvania's 15th congressional district, 1992
Party	Candidate	Votes	%
Democratic	Paul McHale	111,419	52.23
Republican	Donald L. Ritter (incumbent)	99,520	46.65
Natural Law	Eugene A. Nau	2,385	1.12
Total votes		213,324	100.00
Democratic gain from Republican			

==== By county ====
County	Paul McHale Democratic		Donald L. Ritter Republican		Eugene Nau Natural Law		Write-in		Margin		Total votes cast
County	#	%	#	%	#	%	#	%	#	%	Total votes cast
Lehigh	57,153	51.80%	52,031	47.16%	1,141	1.03%	10	0.01%	5,122	4.64%	110,335
Montgomery	3,896	40.71%	5,630	58.83%	44	0.46%	0	0.00%	–1,734	–18.12%	9,570
Northampton	50,039	54.01%	41,408	44.69%	1,196	1.29%	3	0.00%	8,631	9.32%	92,646
Totals	111,088	52.26%	99,069	46.61%	2,381	1.12%	13	0.01%	12,019	5.65%	212,551

== District 16 ==
1992 Pennsylvania's 16th congressional district election
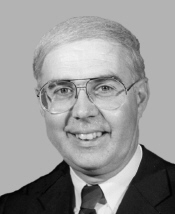

Nominee	Bob Walker	Robert Peters
Party	Republican	Democratic
Popular vote	137,823	74,741
Percentage	64.84%	35.16%
- Walker: 50–60% 60–70% 70–80% 80–90% Peters: 50–60% 60–70% 70–80% 80–90%
U.S. Representative before election
Bob Walker
Republican
Elected U.S. Representative
Bob Walker
Republican

=== Democratic primary ===
==== Candidates ====
===== Nominee =====
- Robert Peters

==== Primary results ====
Democratic primary results
Party	Candidate	Votes	%
Democratic	Robert Peters	18,647	100.00
Total votes		18,647	100.00

=== Republican primary ===
==== Candidates ====
===== Nominee =====
- Bob Walker, incumbent U.S. Representative

==== Primary results ====
Republican primary results
Party	Candidate	Votes	%
Republican	Bob Walker (incumbent)	57,596	100.00
Total votes		57,596	100.00

=== General election ===
Pennsylvania's 16th congressional district, 1992
Party	Candidate	Votes	%
Republican	Bob Walker (incumbent)	137,823	64.84
Democratic	Robert Peters	74,741	35.16
Total votes		212,564	100.00
Republican hold			

==== By county ====
County	Bob Walker Republican		Robert Peters Democratic		Write-in		Margin		Total votes cast
County	#	%	#	%	#	%	#	%	Total votes cast
Chester	71,682	63.01%	41,719	36.67%	358	0.31%	29,963	26.34%	113,759
Lancaster	62,529	66.18%	31,956	33.82%	0	0.00%	30,573	32.36%	94,485
Totals	134,211	64.45%	73,675	35.38%	358	0.17%	60,536	29.07%	208,244

== District 17 ==
1992 Pennsylvania's 17th congressional district election
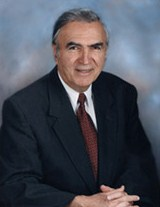

Nominee	George Gekas	Bill Sturges
Party	Republican	Democratic
Popular vote	150,158	65,881
Percentage	69.51%	30.49%
- Gekas: 50–60% 60–70% 70–80% 80–90% Sturges: 50–60% 60–70% Tie: 50%
U.S. Representative before election
George Gekas
Republican
Elected U.S. Representative
George Gekas
Republican

=== Democratic primary ===
==== Candidates ====
===== Nominee =====
- Bill Sturges

==== Primary results ====
Democratic primary results
Party	Candidate	Votes	%
Democratic	Bill Sturges	23,027	100.00
Total votes		23,027	100.00

=== Republican primary ===
==== Candidates ====
===== Nominee =====
- George Gekas, incumbent U.S. Representative

==== Primary results ====
Republican primary results
Party	Candidate	Votes	%
Republican	George Gekas (incumbent)	59,042	100.00
Total votes		59,042	100.00

=== General election ===
Pennsylvania's 17th congressional district, 1992
Party	Candidate	Votes	%
Republican	George Gekas (incumbent)	150,158	69.51
Democratic	Bill Sturges	65,881	30.49
Total votes		216,039	100.00
Republican hold			

==== By county ====
County	George Gekas Republican		Bill Sturges Democratic		Write-in		Margin		Total votes cast
County	#	%	#	%	#	%	#	%	Total votes cast
Cumberland	15,120	71.60%	5,997	28.40%	1	0.00%	9,123	43.20%	21,118
Dauphin	66,373	69.19%	29,561	30.81%	0	0.00%	36,812	38.37%	95,934
Lancaster	34,380	70.41%	14,451	29.59%	0	0.00%	19,929	40.81%	48,831
Lebanon	26,382	66.34%	13,385	33.66%	0	0.00%	12,997	32.68%	39,767
Perry	7,988	76.28%	2,482	23.70%	2	0.02%	5,506	52.58%	10,472
Totals	150,243	69.52%	65,876	30.48%	3	0.00%	84,367	39.04%	216,122

== District 18 ==
1992 Pennsylvania's 18th congressional district election
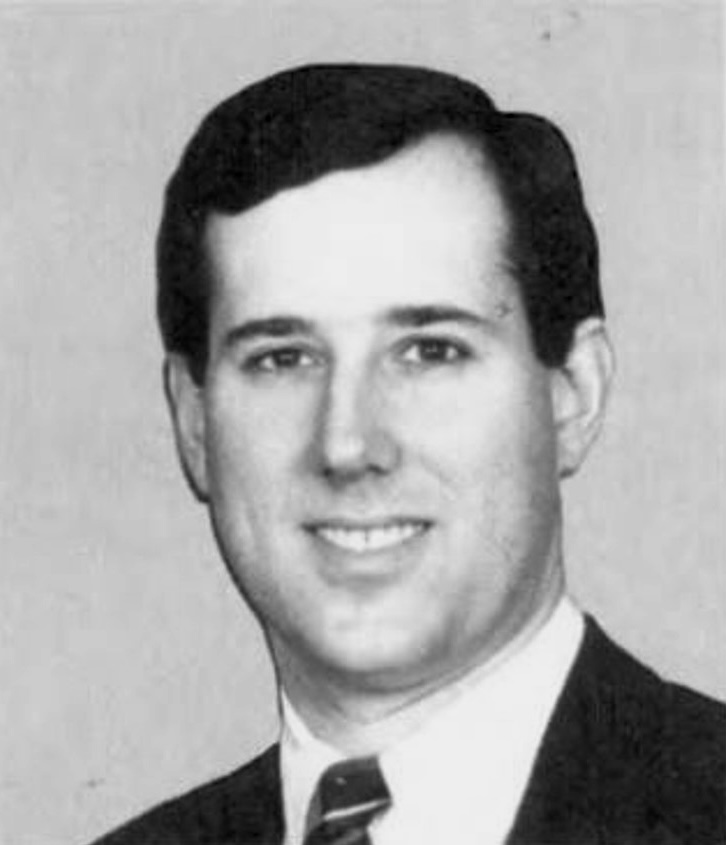

Nominee	Rick Santorum	Frank Pecora
Party	Republican	Democratic
Popular vote	154,024	96,655
Percentage	60.56%	38.00%
- Precinct results Santorum: 40–50% 50–60% 60–70% 70–80% 80–90% Pecora: 40–50% 50–60% 60–70% 70–80% 80–90% >90% Tie: 40–50%
U.S. Representative before election
Rick Santorum
Republican
Elected U.S. Representative
Rick Santorum
Republican

=== Democratic primary ===
==== Candidates ====
===== Nominee =====
- Frank Pecora, member of the Pennsylvania State Senate (1979–present)

===== Eliminated in primary =====
- Mike Adams
- Richard Caligiuri
- Luke Kelly
- Constance B. Komm
- David Levdansky, member of the Pennsylvania House of Representatives (1985–present)
- Marick Masters
- Emil Mrkonic
- Jim Olson
- Jeff Pribanic
- Susan A. Roach
- Jim West

==== Primary results ====
Democratic primary results
Party	Candidate	Votes	%
Democratic	Frank Pecora	19,839	19.03
Democratic	Mike Adams	13,939	13.37
Democratic	David Levdansky	13,608	13.05
Democratic	Jim West	11,924	11.44
Democratic	Jeff Pribanic	10,353	9.93
Democratic	Luke Kelly	7,421	7.12
Democratic	Marick Masters	6,796	6.52
Democratic	Richard Caligiuri	6,132	5.88
Democratic	Emil Mrkonic	5,601	5.37
Democratic	Susan A. Roach	4,218	4.05
Democratic	Constance B. Komm	2,878	2.76
Democratic	Jim Olson	1,534	1.47
Total votes		104,243	100.00

=== Republican primary ===
==== Candidates ====
===== Nominee =====
- Rick Santorum, incumbent U.S. Representative

==== Primary results ====
Republican primary results
Party	Candidate	Votes	%
Republican	Rick Santorum (incumbent)	38,439	100.00
Total votes		38,439	100.00

=== General election ===
Pennsylvania's 18th congressional district, 1992
Party	Candidate	Votes	%
Republican	Rick Santorum (incumbent)	154,024	60.56
Democratic	Frank Pecora	96,655	38.00
New Independent	Denise Winebrenner Edwards	3,650	1.44
Total votes		254,329	100.00
Republican hold			

==== By county ====
County	Rick Santorum Republican		Frank Pecora Democratic		Denise Edwards Independent		Margin		Total votes cast
County	#	%	#	%	#	%	#	%	Total votes cast
Allegheny	154,024	60.56%	96,655	38.00%	3,650	1.44%	57,369	22.56%	254,329
Totals	154,024	60.56%	96,655	38.00%	3,650	1.44%	57,369	22.56%	254,329

== District 19 ==
1992 Pennsylvania's 19th congressional district election
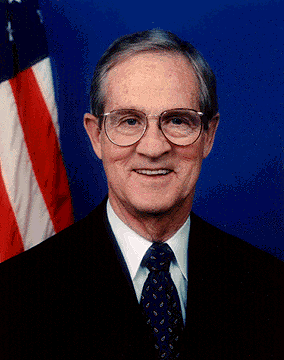

Nominee	Bill Goodling	Paul Kilker	Thomas Humbert
Party	Republican	Democratic	Independent
Popular vote	98,599	74,798	44,190
Percentage	45.31%	34.38%	20.31%
- Goodling: 30–40% 40–50% 50–60% 60–70% Kilker: 30–40% 40–50% 50–60% 60–70% Humbert: 30–40% No data
U.S. Representative before election
Bill Goodling
Republican
Elected U.S. Representative
Bill Goodling
Republican

=== Democratic primary ===
==== Candidates ====
===== Nominee =====
- Paul V. Kilker

==== Primary results ====
Democratic primary results
Party	Candidate	Votes	%
Democratic	Paul V. Kilker	25,661	100.00
Total votes		25,661	100.00

=== Republican primary ===
==== Candidates ====
===== Nominee =====
- Bill Goodling, incumbent U.S. Representative

==== Primary results ====
Republican primary results
Party	Candidate	Votes	%
Republican	Bill Goodling (incumbent)	42,394	100.00
Total votes		42,394	100.00

=== General election ===
Pennsylvania's 19th congressional district, 1992
Party	Candidate	Votes	%
Republican	Bill Goodling (incumbent)	98,599	45.31
Democratic	Paul V. Kilker	74,798	34.38
Independent	Thomas M. Humbert	44,190	20.31
Total votes		217,587	100.00
Republican hold			

==== By county ====
County	Bill Goodling Republican		Paul Kilker Democratic		Thomas Humbert Independent		Write-in		Margin		Total votes cast
County	#	%	#	%	#	%	#	%	#	%	Total votes cast
Adams	12,305	42.43%	8,930	30.79%	7,740	26.69%	27	0.09%	3,375	11.64%	29,002
Cumberland	26,965	45.59%	20,416	34.52%	11,761	19.89%	3	0.01%	6,549	11.07%	59,145
York	59,302	45.82%	45,436	35.11%	24,684	19.07%	0	0.00%	13,866	10.71%	129,422
Totals	98,572	45.31%	74,782	34.37%	44,185	20.31%	30	0.01%	23,790	10.93%	217,569

== District 20 ==
1992 Pennsylvania's 20th congressional district
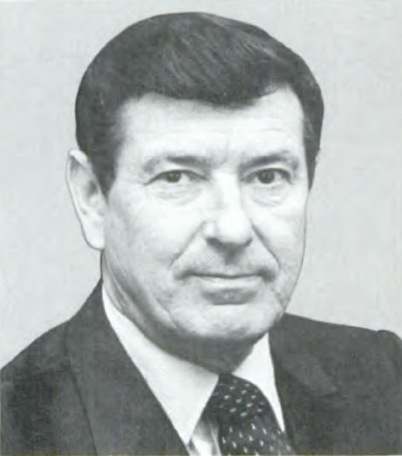

Nominee	Austin Murphy	Bill Townsend
Party	Democratic	Republican
Popular vote	114,898	111,591
Percentage	50.73%	49.27%
- Murphy: 50–60% 60–70% 70–80% 80–90% >90% Townsend: 50–60% 60–70% 70–80% 80–90% Tie: 50%
U.S. Representative before election
Austin Murphy
Democratic
Elected U.S. Representative
Austin Murphy
Democratic

The 1990 redistricting cycle resulted in the combining of the existing 20th and 22nd congressional districts. The 20th district representative, Joseph M. Gaydos, opted to retire. Austin Murphy, the 2nd district representative, ran for reelection.

=== Democratic primary ===
==== Candidates ====
===== Nominee =====
- Austin Murphy, incumbent U.S. Representative

===== Eliminated in primary =====
- Kenneth B. Burkley
- Frank Mascara, Washington County Commissioner (1980–present)
- William A. Nicolella
- Eugene G. Saloom

==== Primary results ====
Democratic primary results
Party	Candidate	Votes	%
Democratic	Austin Murphy (incumbent)	36,585	36.14
Democratic	Frank Mascara	33,942	33.53
Democratic	Kenneth B. Burkley	14,422	14.25
Democratic	William A. Nicolella	8,520	8.42
Democratic	Eugene G. Saloom	7,755	7.66
Total votes		101,224	100.00

=== Republican primary ===
==== Candidates ====
===== Nominee =====
- Bill Townsend

===== Eliminated in primary =====
- Suzanne Hayden

==== Primary results ====
Republican primary results
Party	Candidate	Votes	%
Republican	Bill Townsend	15,810	50.39
Republican	Suzanne Hayden	15,568	49.61
Total votes		31,378	100.00

=== General election ===
Pennsylvania's 20th congressional district, 1992
Party	Candidate	Votes	%
Democratic	Austin Murphy (incumbent)	114,898	50.73
Republican	Bill Townsend	111,591	49.27
Total votes		226,489	100.00
Democratic hold			

==== By county ====
County	Austin Murphy Democratic		Bill Townsend Republican		Margin		Total votes cast
County	#	%	#	%	#	%	Total votes cast
Allegheny	22,425	41.21%	31,997	58.79%	–9,572	–17.59%	54,422
Fayette	21,196	65.20%	11,314	34.80%	9,882	30.40%	32,510
Greene	8,306	56.05%	6,513	43.95%	1,793	12.10%	14,819
Washington	40,974	49.34%	42,062	50.66%	–1,088	–1.31%	83,036
Westmoreland	22,014	52.73%	19,738	47.27%	2,276	5.45%	41,752
Totals	114,915	50.73%	111,624	49.27%	3,291	1.45%	226,539

== District 21 ==
1992 Pennsylvania's 21st congressional district election
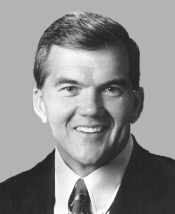

Nominee	Tom Ridge	John Harkins
Party	Republican	Democratic
Popular vote	150,729	70,802
Percentage	68.04%	31.96%
- Ridge: 50–60% 60–70% 70–80% 80–90% Harkins: 50–60% 60–70% 70–80%
U.S. Representative before election
Tom Ridge
Republican
Elected U.S. Representative
Tom Ridge
Republican

=== Democratic primary ===
==== Candidates ====
===== Nominee =====
- John C. Harkins

===== Eliminated in primary =====
- Mary Ann McDanniels-Kulesa

==== Primary results ====
Democratic primary results
Party	Candidate	Votes	%
Democratic	John C. Harkins	23,438	55.17
Democratic	Mary Ann McDanniels-Kulesa	19,044	44.83
Total votes		42,482	100.00

=== Republican primary ===
==== Candidates ====
===== Nominee =====
- Tom Ridge, incumbent U.S. Representative

==== Primary results ====
Republican primary results
Party	Candidate	Votes	%
Republican	Tom Ridge (incumbent)	45,934	100.00
Total votes		45,934	100.00

=== General election ===
Pennsylvania's 21st congressional district, 1992
Party	Candidate	Votes	%
Republican	Tom Ridge (incumbent)	150,729	68.04
Democratic	John C. Harkins	70,802	31.96
Total votes		221,531	100.00
Republican hold			

==== By county ====
County	Tom Ridge Republican		John Harkins Democratic		Write-in		Margin		Total votes cast
County	#	%	#	%	#	%	#	%	Total votes cast
Butler	23,578	58.15%	16,966	41.85%	0	0.00%	6,612	16.31%	40,544
Crawford	18,769	75.59%	6,062	24.41%	0	0.00%	12,707	51.17%	24,831
Erie	78,044	69.08%	34,930	30.92%	0	0.00%	43,114	38.16%	112,974
Mercer	30,338	65.83%	15,748	34.17%	2	0.00%	14,590	31.66%	46,088
Totals	150,729	67.16%	73,706	32.84%	2	0.00%	77,023	34.32%	224,437

== See also ==
- Pennsylvania's congressional delegations
- 103rd United States Congress
