= Roman Kozak =

Roman Kozak may refer to:

- Roman Kozak (theatre director) (1957–2010), Russian theatre actor and director
- Roman Kozak (Ukrainian politician) (born 1957), candidate in the 2004 Ukrainian presidential election
- Roman Kozak (American politician), Pennsylvanian state representative, currently representing the 14th District.
