= Jim E. Marshall =

American politician

- Marshall at Montgomery Locks and Dam in 2022

Member of the Pennsylvania House of Representatives from the 14th district
- In office January 2, 2007 – January 7, 2025
- Preceded by: Mike Veon
- Succeeded by: Roman Kozak

Personal details
- Born: April 2, 1960 (age 66) New Brighton, Pennsylvania
- Party: Republican
- Spouse: Cindy Marshall
- Children: 1
- Website: (Archived) Website for Pennsylvania State Representative Jim Marshall

James E. Marshall (born April 2, 1960) was a member of the Pennsylvania House of Representatives for the 14th District from 2007 to 2025, and is a member of the Republican Party.

Marshall attended Beaver Falls High School and was employed by Ag Hog Pittsburgh prior to his election. His only prior elected office had been serving two terms as Vice President of Big Beaver Borough Council in Beaver County.

In 2006, Marshall ran for the House of Representatives against House Minority Whip, Rep. Mike Veon. At the time, Veon was under a great deal of criticism for his role in the 2005 legislative pay raise. Veon not only supported the pay increase, but was the only legislator to vote against its repeal. Despite heavy Democratic registration in the district, Marshall prevailed in the general election with 53.9% of the vote.

Marshall served on four House committees: Commerce, Gaming Oversight, Veterans Affairs and Emergency Preparedness, and Policy. He served as Chairman of the Subcommittee on Security and Emergency Response of the Veterans Affairs and Emergency Preparedness Committee. Additionally, he was named to the Port of Pittsburgh Commission, a board dedicated to promoting the commercial use and development of the inland waterways in western Pennsylvania.

During his term as representative, Marshall was against legalizing adult-use cannabis in Pennsylvania.

In 2023, Marshall chose not to run for re-election, and in the 2024 legislative election in Pennsylvania, his seat was won by Roman Kozak, the Republican candidate.

== Committee assignments ==
- Consumer Affairs, Chair
- Transportation
