= Frank LaGrotta =

American politician

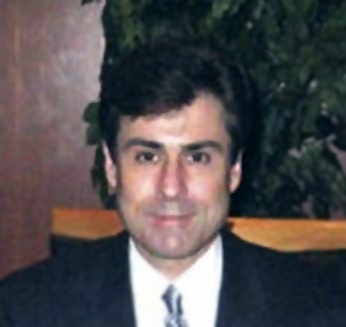

Member of the Pennsylvania House of Representatives from the 10th district
- In office January 6, 1987 – November 30, 2006
- Preceded by: Ralph Pratt
- Succeeded by: Jaret Gibbons

Personal details
- Born: November 25, 1958 (age 67) Ellwood City, Pennsylvania, U.S.
- Party: Democratic
- Education: University of Notre Dame (BA, MA); University of Pittsburgh
- Profession: Journalist

Frank LaGrotta (November 25, 1958) is a former Democratic member of the Pennsylvania House of Representatives from the 10th District from 1987 to 2006.

== Personal life ==
LaGrotta was born in Ellwood City. He is an alumnus of Riverside High School. He graduated from the University of Notre Dame, having received a Bachelor of Arts in 1980 and a Master of Arts in 1981. He is the grandson of immigrants.

After graduation, LaGrotta worked as a sports journalist with Gannett News Service from 1981 to 1983. LaGrotta returned home to work as office manager for Ralph Pratt, who was then the representative for the 10th district. He also served as Legislative Director of the Beaver County Legislative Delegation from 1983 to 1986.

== Political career ==
Upon Pratt's election as a judge, LaGrotta ran for his boss's seat. In 1986 he defeated Republican Jim Gerlach, who later became a U.S. Representative for Pennsylvania's 6th congressional district. LaGrotta was considered a Casey Democrat because of his pro-life stance and his strong ties to organized labor.

He won re-election nine times, largely with token Republican opposition. He faced one serious challenge in the GOP landslide year of 1994 winning with only 53% of the vote. After the 1994 scare, LaGrotta ran unopposed in four of his last five races.

In 1992, LaGrotta ran for the U.S. House of Representatives in Pennsylvania's 4th congressional district against incumbent Democrat Joseph P. Kolter who was implicated in the Congressional Post Office scandal. He finished fourth in a four-way primary that also included Ron Klink, the victor, and fellow state Representative Mike Veon.

During his tenure, LaGrotta established himself as a strong advocate for his district, securing funds for 11 bridges in Ellwood City, leading opposition to a hazardous waste facility in his district, and lobbying for public works projects.

=== 2006 primary election ===
LaGrotta ran for re-election for an eleventh term, but was defeated in the primary for the 2006 election by political newcomer Jaret Gibbons. The margin of defeat was 28 votes.

The election focused on LaGrotta's support for the controversial 2005 legislative pay raise.

Following the election, LaGrotta was appointed to fill a vacant seat on the Lawrence County Housing Authority in December 2006. He resigned this position in October 2007.

== Conflict of interest legal proceedings ==
On November 14, 2007, LaGrotta was arraigned in Harrisburg, Pennsylvania, on two corruption-related felony charges, following the Attorney General's investigation into the 2006 bonus controversy. According to State Attorney General Tom Corbett, LaGrotta allegedly used his position to have his sister and niece paid over $26,000 from state funds. On December 20, he pleaded not guilty to the charges. On February 3, 2008, LaGrotta pleaded guilty to two felony counts of conflict of interest for having ghost workers on his payroll. He was sentenced to six months of house arrest, along with probation and fines. He will continue to receive his full pension of $48,000 per year, since conflict of interest convictions do not fall under the Pennsylvania State Employees' Retirement System's list of 23 crimes that require pension forfeiture. After his guilty plea, he stopped repaying the unvouchered expenses from the 2005 legislative payraise and was refunded the amount that he had previously returned.

== Prescription altering guilty plea ==
On April 7, 2011, LaGrotta pleaded guilty to altering prescriptions he had submitted to three different pharmacies, in two Pennsylvania counties, to obtain more of the anti-anxiety medication Xanax. His plea included admissions of guilt in fraudulently obtaining a controlled substance, possession of a controlled substance and forgery (for changing the date of prescriptions from March to May 2010, changing daily dosing instructions from two to three per day, and changing the number of pills prescribed from 120 to 180.) His sentencing (which could include incarceration) was docketed for June 7, 2011.

== Post-legislative career ==
In spite of his legal troubles, LaGrotta received $30,000 per year in his legislative pension. He is writing a book about his experiences and has launched a blog Politics As (Not) Usual, where he gives his unique perspective on political issues. The book, which cannot be published until his probation ends, is tentatively titled Be Careful, I'm Wired. He is also teaching a class on politics and government at Franciscan University of Steubenville in Ohio. In an interview with journalist John Micek of The Morning Call, LaGrotta said that following his house arrest, he was returning to Catholicism and contemplating his legislative career.

Pennsylvania House of Representatives
Preceded by Ralph D. Pratt	Member of the Pennsylvania House of Representatives for the 10th District; 1987 – 2006	Succeeded by Jaret Gibbons
