= GrassrootsPA =

American political news website

- Available in: English
- Creator: Chris Lilik
- Registration: No
- Launched: 2004; 22 years ago
- Current status: Defunct

GrassrootsPA was a political news website centered on the politics of Pennsylvania. It was founded in 2004 by then law student Chris Lilik, a Pat Toomey supporter and became a "must-click resource" for Pennsylvania's conservative community. Even though Toomey lost that race, the website continued as a gathering place for conservatives and Specter's foes. The website also gained mainstream media attention as a source of breaking political news. Political commentator Chris Bravacos noted that GrassrootsPA attracted significantly higher readership than the official websites for the two major political parties.

During the public outcry following the 2005 Pennsylvania legislative pay raise, GrassrootsPA served as a focal point for reform activists. The American Spectator called GrassrootsPA a "flashpoint of this conservative revolution" in Pennsylvania.

In 2010, Politics Magazine described GrassrootsPA as "Pennsylvania's Drudge Report."
