= Jaret Gibbons =

American politician (born 1980)

Jaret A. Gibbons

Member of the Pennsylvania House of Representatives from the 10th district
- In office January 2, 2007 – January 2, 2017
- Preceded by: Frank LaGrotta
- Succeeded by: Aaron Bernstine

Personal details
- Born: October 7, 1980 (age 45) Ellwood City, Pennsylvania, U.S.
- Party: Democratic
- Education: Duquesne University; University of Pittsburgh
- Profession: Attorney

Jaret A. Gibbons (born October 7, 1980) was a member of the Pennsylvania House of Representatives, representing the 10th legislative district. He was elected in 2006.

Prior to elective office, Gibbons graduated from Duquesne University and the University of Pittsburgh School of Law, where he was editor in chief of the Pittsburgh Tax Review. He has co-written articles on several topics, includingof Pennsylvania employment law, tax law and retirement benefits. Gibbons also served as Finnegan Fellow with the Pennsylvania Department of State's Bureau of Elections. He also worked for Pennsylvania State Senator Jay Costa. He managed the Government Accounting Standards Board Rule 34 accounting project for the Moon Township Finance Department.

In 2006, he defeated 20-year incumbent Frank LaGrotta for the Democratic nomination at the age 25, while still a law student. LaGrotta's defeat was likely a result of his support for the controversial 2005 legislative pay raise.
