= Veon =

Veon may refer to:

- Mike Veon, United States politician
- VEON, telecommunications company
