= Colleen Kopp =

American lobbyist

Colleen M. Kopp
- Education: Indiana University of Pennsylvania
- Occupation: lobbyist
- Known for: Veon, Kopp & Associates
- Political party: Democrat

Colleen M. Kopp is a lobbyist with Wojdak Government Relations and a former legislative staffer in Pennsylvania. Prior to that she was an aide for House Minority Whip Mike Veon and for Governor Ed Rendell. She is a former Secretary of Legislative Affairs.

She earned a degree in public policy from the Indiana University of Pennsylvania.

She first rose to prominence as executive director for House Minority Whip Representative Mike Veon. In March 2003, she was hired by the newly elected governor Ed Rendell to serve as his Deputy Secretary of Legislative Affairs.

The political website PoliticsPA called her "the Democrats version of the GOP's Mary Matalin. She was named to the PoliticsPA list of "Pennsylvania's Most Politically Powerful Women," where her work for many Pennsylvania House of Representatives elections was noted. She was named to the PoliticsPA list of "Rising Stars" in Pennsylvania.

In 2007, she partnered with Mike Veon, who had been defeated for re-election in 2006, to found the Veon, Kopp & Associates lobbying firm, with U.S. Smokeless Tobacco Company as its first client. The firm was dissolved in April 2008 and Kopp returned to lobbying under the name of Kopp & Associates LLC, where she represented Independence Blue Cross. In March 2009, she returned to Governor Rendell's office, the third individual hired in spite of Rendell's self-imposed hiring freeze. The Governor dismissed questions about the appropriateness of hiring Kopp, who was mentioned but not accused of wrongdoing in the criminal proceedings of her former boss and business partner Mike Veon.

Government offices
Preceded by Steve Crawford	Secretary of Legislative Affairs for The Governor of Pennsylvania; 2009–2011	Succeeded by Annmarie Kaiser
