= Hillsville =

Hillsville may refer to:

- Hillsville, Pennsylvania
- Hillsville, Virginia
