= 2000 United States Senate election in Pennsylvania =

- November 7, 2000
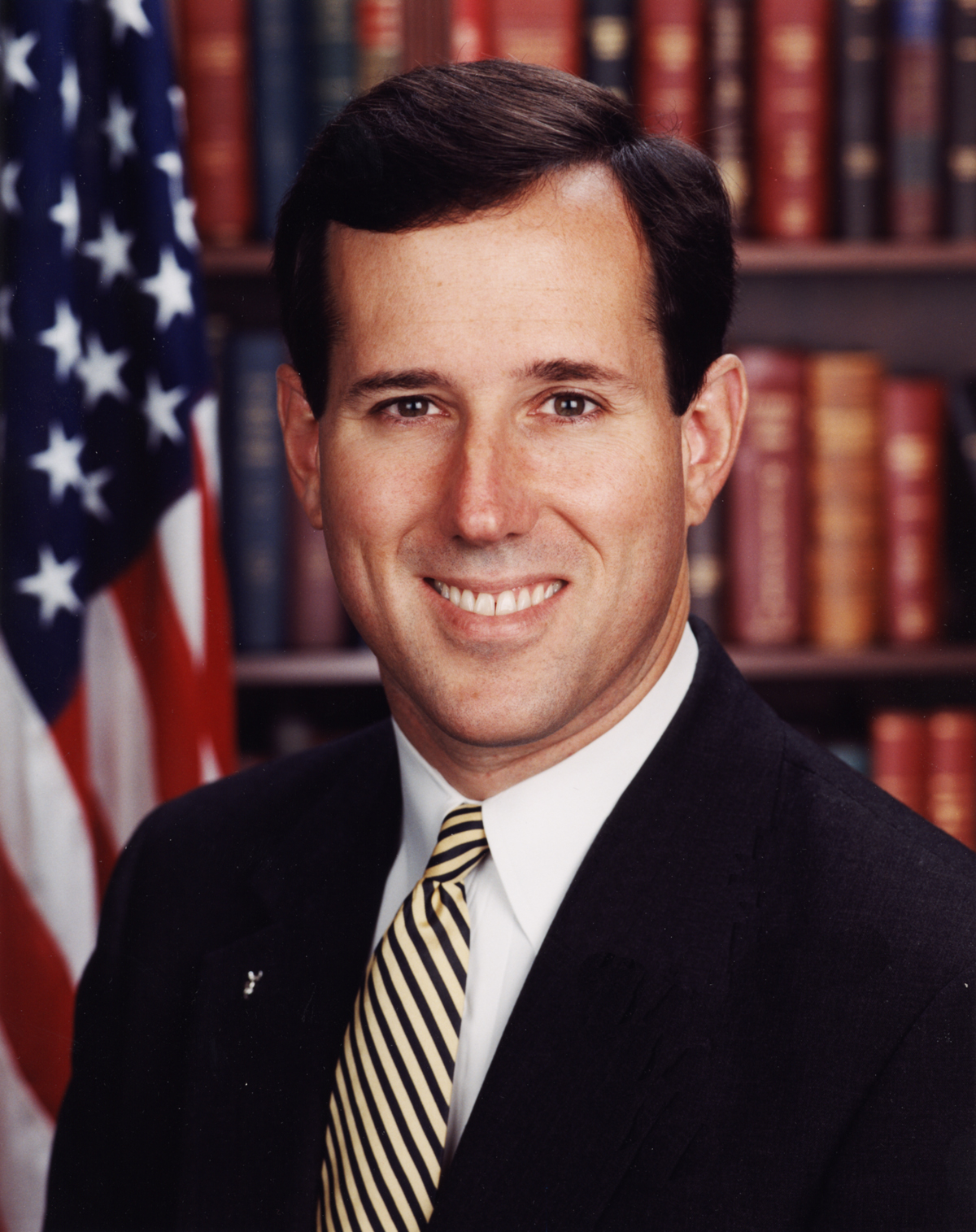

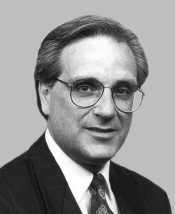
Nominee	Rick Santorum	Ron Klink
Party	Republican	Democratic
Popular vote	2,481,962	2,154,908
Percentage	52.42%	45.51%
- Santorum: 50–60% 60–70% 70–80% 80–90% >90% Klink: 50–60% 60–70% 70–80% 80–90% >90% Tie: 50% No data
U.S. senator before election
Rick Santorum
Republican
Elected U.S. Senator
Rick Santorum
Republican

The 2000 United States Senate election in Pennsylvania was held on November 7, 2000. Republican incumbent Rick Santorum was re-elected to a second term in office over Democratic congressman Ron Klink.

Pennsylvania was considered a swing state in the concurrent United States presidential election. It was ultimately one of four states that elected Republican senators despite being voting for Democratic presidential nominee Al Gore, along with the New England states of Maine, Rhode Island and Vermont. Republicans would not win the Class 1 Senate seat from Pennsylvania again until 2024.

== Republican primary ==
2000 Republican U.S. Senate primary
Party	Candidate	Votes	%
Republican	Rick Santorum (inc.)	545,687	100.00
Total votes		545,687	100.00

== Democratic primary ==
=== Candidates ===
- Phil Berg
- Tom Foley, former Pennsylvania labor secretary and 1994 lieutenant governor nominee
- Ron Klink, U.S. representative from Murrysville
- Murray Levin
- Robert A. Rovner, former Republican state senator from Philadelphia
- Allyson Schwartz, state senator from Northeast Philadelphia

=== Campaign ===
Klink portrayed himself as the only candidate who could defeat Santorum.

=== Results ===
Results by county Klink: 30%–40%; 40%–50%; 50%–60%; 60%–70%; 70%–80%; 80%–90%; Schwartz: 30%–40%; 40%–50%; 50%–60%; Foley: 30%–40%; 40%–50%; 50%–60%; 60%–70%

2000 Democratic U.S. Senate primary
Party	Candidate	Votes	%
Democratic	Ron Klink	299,219	40.73
Democratic	Allyson Schwartz	194,763	26.52
Democratic	Tom Foley	184,003	25.05
Democratic	Bob Rovner	28,031	3.82
Democratic	Murray Levin	18,903	2.57
Democratic	Phil Berg	9,636	1.31
Total votes		734,575	100.00

== General election ==
=== Candidates ===
- Robert Domske (Reform)
- John Featherman (Libertarian)
- Ron Klink, U.S. representative from Murrysville (Democratic)
- Rick Santorum, incumbent U.S. senator since 1995 (Republican)
- Lester Searer (Constitution)

=== Campaign ===
Santorum had gained a reputation as a polarizing figure during his first term in the Senate, and had lost the support of more moderate members of his own party by 1999, but entered the race with a large fundraising advantage and high levels of support from the political right. Klink was viewed as a viable choice because he was a traditional Democrat on most issues and had strong union ties but also was opposed to abortion rights, which Democrats hoped would return votes to their party in the heavily Catholic but economically liberal coal regions of the state. The campaign turned increasingly negative as both candidates publicly questioned each other's integrity.

Enthusiasm around Klink's campaign then waned as liberal Democrats balked at donating to a candidate who was almost as socially conservative as Santorum. This was especially true in Philadelphia, where Klink was all but unknown. Klink was also badly outspent, leaving him unable to expand his presence in the state; he did not run a single advertisement on Philadelphia television stations. Ultimately, Klink only carried eight counties as Santorum, who had achieved nationwide prominence for taking positions against abortion and LGBT rights in the United States, was ultimately able to secure victory.

=== Debates ===
2000 Pennsylvania U.S. Senate election debate
No.	Date	Host	Moderators	Link	Republican	Democratic	Libertarian	Constitution	Reform
Key: P Participant A Absent N Not invited I Invited W Withdrawn									
Key: P Participant A Absent N Not invited I Invited W Withdrawn					Santorum	Klink	Featherman	Searer	Domske
1	September 30, 2000	WPVI-TV	Marc Howard	C-SPAN	P	P	N	N	N
2	October 14, 2000	WJET-TV	Kelly Gaughan; Sean Lafferty; Bob Lloyd; Matthew Locke	C-SPAN	P	P	N	N	N
3	October 23, 2000	WPXI	David Johnson	C-SPAN	P	P	N	N	N

=== Polling ===
Poll source	Date(s)	Sample size	Margin of error	Rick Santorum (R)	Ron Klink (D)	Other / undecided (Note: Calculated by taking the difference of 100% and all other candidates combined.)
Rasmussen Reports	November 5, 2000	1,091	—	52%	38%	10%
Zogby Analytics	November 5, 2000	592	—	52%	34%	14%
Harris Insights & Analytics	November 2, 2000	5,789 (Note: Sample size unavailable; 600 is a default estimate used in the source dataset.) (Note: Average of multiple versions or turnout models listed in the poll.)	—	55%	39.5%	5.5%
Mason-Dixon Polling & Strategy	November 2, 2000	625	—	55%	36%	9%
Rasmussen Reports	November 2, 2000	644	—	56%	36%	8%
Zogby Analytics	November 2, 2000	600	—	50%	34%	16%
Decision Forecasting	November 1, 2000	1,032	—	55%	34%	11%
SurveyUSA	November 1, 2000	800	—	57%	41%	2%
Zogby Analytics	October 30, 2000	600	—	51%	34%	15%
Rasmussen Reports	October 29, 2000	967	—	54%	36%	10%
Millersville University Center for Politics and Public Affairs	October 28, 2000	550	—	48%	27%	25%
Zogby Analytics	October 27, 2000	600	—	54%	33%	13%
Public Opinion Strategies (R) (Note: Poll conducted for an unspecified Republican sponsor.)	October 22, 2000	500	—	53%	31%	16%
Rasmussen Reports	October 18, 2000	1,043	—	52%	39%	9%
Lincoln Institute	October 17, 2000	728	—	49%	38%	13%

=== Results ===
General election results
Party	Candidate	Votes	%	±%
Republican	Rick Santorum (incumbent)	2,481,962	52.42	+3.02
Democratic	Ron Klink	2,154,908	45.51	−1.41
Libertarian	John Featherman	45,775	0.97	−0.71
Constitution	Lester Searer	28,382	0.60	+0.60
Reform	Robert Domske	24,089	0.51	+0.50
Majority		327,054	6.91	+4.43
Total votes		4,735,116	100.00	
Republican hold				

==== Counties that flipped from Democratic to Republican ====
- Cambria (largest municipality: Johnstown)
- Clinton (largest city: Lock Haven)
- Luzerne (largest municipality: Wilkes-Barre)

== See also ==
- 2000 United States Senate elections
