= Barry Alderette =

American politician (1939–1996)

Barry L. Alderette

Member of the Pennsylvania House of Representatives from the 14th district
- In office 1983–1984
- Preceded by: Joseph P. Kolter
- Succeeded by: Mike Veon

Personal details
- Born: August 8, 1939 New Brighton, Pennsylvania, U.S.
- Died: May 17, 1996 (aged 56) Beaver Falls, Pennsylvania, U.S.
- Party: Democratic

Barry Lynn Alderette (August 8, 1939 – May 17, 1996) was a Democratic member of the Pennsylvania House of Representatives for one year.

== Early life and education ==
Barry was born in New Brighton, Beaver County, Pennsylvania on 8 August 1939 and attended Beaver Falls High School. His father was James Ellis Alderette and mother was Elizabeth Diane (Kier) Alderette, with siblings Barry, Arthur, and Beverly.

He attended Geneva College and Pennsylvania State University.

== Personal life ==
He was married to Patricia Ivancik Alderette and has a daughter, Chaundra

== Career ==
He served in United States Air Force (1960) and the Pennsylvania Air National Guard (1960–1966). He was a licensed insurance agent and the owner and operator of Alderette Insurance Company.

He also worked as special assistant and auditor at Pennsylvania Department of the Auditor General. He was elected as the treasurer of Beaver Falls (1978–1982) and member of the Planning Commission for Beaver Falls (1975–1983). He was a member of Municipal Water Authority at Beaver Falls (1977–1983). He was the president of Beaver County Young Democrats and a member of the Beaver Falls Democratic Committee (1972–1982). He was the city chairman (1974–1980). He was elected as a Democrat to the Pennsylvania House of Representatives in 1982 and served one term, his unsuccessful campaign for re-election to the House (1984).
