= Pennsylvania House of Representatives, District 10 =

American legislative district

Pennsylvania's 10th State House of Representatives district
Representative
Amen Brown; D–Philadelphia
- Population (2020): 61,532

The 10th Pennsylvania House of Representatives District is located in southeastern Pennsylvania. Its current representative is Amen Brown.

== District profile ==
The 10th District is located in Philadelphia County and includes the following areas:

- Philadelphia (part)
  - Ward 04 (part)
    - Division 01
    - Division 07
    - Division 08
    - Division 12
  - Ward 06 (part)
    - Division 01
    - Division 02
    - Division 03
    - Division 04
    - Division 05
    - Division 06
    - Division 07
    - Division 08
    - Division 09
    - Division 10
    - Division 11
    - Division 12
    - Division 16
  - Ward 08 (part)
    - Division 17
    - Division 18
    - Division 19
    - Division 22
    - Division 23
    - Division 29
  - Ward 24
  - Ward 44 (part)
    - Division 03
    - Division 04
    - Division 06
    - Division 08
    - Division 09
    - Division 10
    - Division 13
    - Division 14
    - Division 15
    - Division 16
  - Ward 60 (part)
    - Division 04
    - Division 05
    - Division 06
    - Division 07
    - Division 11
    - Division 14
    - Division 15
    - Division 16
    - Division 17
    - Division 18
    - Division 19
    - Division 20
    - Division 21
    - Division 22

== Representatives ==
Representative	Party	Years	District home	Notes
Prior to 1969, seats were apportioned by county.
Donald W. Fox	Republican	1969 – 1974	Enon Valley	Moved from the 2nd Lawrence County district.
Ralph D. Pratt	Democrat	1975 – 1986	New Castle	Resigned on January 8 after being elected district judge.
Frank LaGrotta	Democrat	1987 – 2006	Ellwood City	Defeated in primary election.
Jaret Gibbons	Democrat	2007 – 2016	Ellwood City	Defeated in general election.
Aaron Bernstine	Republican	2017–2022	New Beaver	Redistricted to 8th District
District moved from Beaver, Butler, and Lawrence Counties to Philadelphia County in 2021 redistricting
Amen Brown	Democratic	2023–present		Incumbent

== Recent election results ==
PA House election, 2024: Pennsylvania House, District 10
Party	Candidate	Votes	%
Democratic	Amen Brown (incumbent)	Unopposed	
Total votes		22,910	100.00
Democratic hold			

PA House election, 2022: Pennsylvania House, District 10
Party	Candidate	Votes	%
Democratic	Amen Brown (incumbent)	Unopposed	
Total votes		15,874	100.00
Democratic gain from Republican			

PA House election, 2020: Pennsylvania House, District 10
Party	Candidate	Votes	%
Republican	Aaron Bernstine (incumbent)	15,009	51.50
Democratic	Kolbe Cole	10,032	34.43
Independent	Johnathan Peffer	4,100	14.07
Total votes		29,141	100.00
Republican hold			

PA House election, 2018: Pennsylvania House, District 10
Party	Candidate	Votes	%
Republican	Aaron Bernstine (incumbent)	16,090	78.19
Green	Darcelle Slappy	4,487	21.81
Total votes		20,577	100.00
Republican hold			

PA House election, 2016: Pennsylvania House, District 10
Party	Candidate	Votes	%
Republican	Aaron Bernstine	15,807	58.48
Democratic	Jaret Gibbons (incumbent)	11,224	41.52
Total votes		27,031	100.00
Republican gain from Democratic			

PA House election, 2014: Pennsylvania House, District 10
Party	Candidate	Votes	%
Democratic	Jaret Gibbons (incumbent)	Unopposed	
Total votes		10,820	100.00
Democratic hold			

PA House election, 2012: Pennsylvania House, District 10
Party	Candidate	Votes	%
Democratic	Jaret Gibbons (incumbent)	13,543	52.77
Republican	Michael See	12,120	47.23
Total votes		25,663	100.00
Democratic hold			

PA House election, 2010: Pennsylvania House, District 10
Party	Candidate	Votes	%
Democratic	Jaret Gibbons (incumbent)	9,856	52.24
Republican	Michael See	9,009	47.76
Total votes		18,865	100.00
Democratic hold			

== Sources ==
- Trostle, Sharon, ed. (2009). The Pennsylvania Manual. Vol. 119. Harrisburg: Pennsylvania Department of General Services. ISBN 0-8182-0334-X.
