= Veon, Kopp and Associates =

Veon, Kopp and Associates, LLC
- Type: Limited Liability Company
- Industry: lobbying
- Successor: Kopp and Associates LLC
- Headquarters: 600 North Second Street; Harrisburg, Pennsylvania
- Key people: Mike Veon President; Colleen Kopp Vice President
- Website: http://www.vka.cc/

Veon, Kopp and Associates was a prominent lobbying firm in Pennsylvania. During its entire existence, the firm was embroiled in controversy and eventually was closed after Veon was indicted with criminal charges.

In March 2007, former Pennsylvania House Minority Whip Mike Veon and his former aide Colleen Kopp founded Veon, Kopp and Associates, LLC lobbying firm. The firm's first client was U.S. Smokeless Tobacco Company. The firm quickly added other clients including PNC Financial Services and the Allegheny County Airport Authority.

The firm lobbied on behalf of Lions Gate Entertainment to pass the Pennsylvania Film Production Tax Credit. Inter-firm emails between Kopp and Veon raised questions about whether the two had inappropriately lobbied their former employers.

The firm was dissolved in April 2008 and Kopp returned to lobbying under the name of Kopp & Associates LLC, where she represented Independence Blue Cross.
