= Ralph Pratt =

American politician (1940–2025)

Ralph D. Pratt

Member of the Pennsylvania House of Representatives from the 10th district
- In office January 3, 1975 – January 8, 1986
- Preceded by: Donald Fox
- Succeeded by: Frank LaGrotta

Personal details
- Born: July 7, 1940 New Castle, Pennsylvania, U.S.
- Died: August 18, 2025 (aged 85)
- Party: Democratic

Ralph Domenick Pratt (July 7, 1940 – August 18, 2025) was an American politician who served as a member of the Pennsylvania House of Representatives. Pratt was born in New Castle, Pennsylvania. He was later judge of the Pennsylvania Courts of Common Pleas. He died on August 18, 2025, at the age of 85.
