= Gregory Fajt =

American politician

Gregory C. Fajt

Member of the Pennsylvania House of Representatives from the 42nd district
- In office January 1, 1991 – November 30, 1996
- Preceded by: Terrence McVerry
- Succeeded by: Thomas Stevenson

Personal details
- Born: November 30, 1954 (age 71) Greensburg, Pennsylvania
- Party: Democratic

Gregory C. Fajt (pronounced "fight"; born November 30, 1954) was the third chairman of the Pennsylvania Gaming Control Board. He was appointed to that position in June 2009. He currently serves as a Commissioner. Prior to serving on the Board, he served as chief of staff for Pennsylvania Governor Ed Rendell from 2007 to 2009. He served as secretary of Revenue from 2003 to 2007. He represented the 42nd legislative district in the Pennsylvania House of Representatives from 1991 to 1996. He was also named "big brother of the year" for the Big Brothers and Big Sisters of Pittsburgh. Currently, he is the citizen member of the Board of Claims for the Commonwealth of Pennsylvania.

Government offices
Preceded by Mary DiGiacomo Colins	Chairman of the Pennsylvania Gaming Control Board; 2009–2011	Succeeded by William H. Ryan, Jr.
Preceded by John Estey	Chief of Staff to the Governor of Pennsylvania; 2007–2009	Succeeded by Steve Crawford
Preceded by Larry P. Williams	Secretary of Revenue of Pennsylvania; 2003–2007	Succeeded by Tom Wolf
