= Joshua Eilberg =

American politician (1921–2004)

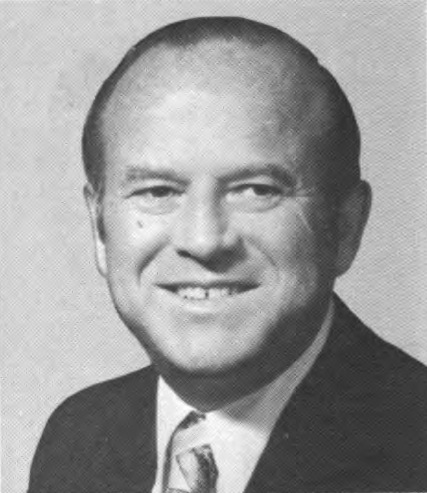

Member of the U.S. House of Representatives from Pennsylvania's 4th district
- In office January 3, 1967 – January 3, 1979
- Preceded by: Herman Toll
- Succeeded by: Charles F. Dougherty

Personal details
- Born: Joshua Eilberg; February 12, 1921 Philadelphia, Pennsylvania, U.S.
- Died: March 24, 2004 (aged 83) Philadelphia, Pennsylvania, U.S.
- Party: Democratic
- Relatives: Amy Eilberg (daughter)
- Education: University of Pennsylvania (BS); Temple University (LLB)

Joshua Eilberg (February 12, 1921 – March 24, 2004) was a Democratic member of the U.S. House of Representatives from Pennsylvania.

== Early life and education ==
Eilberg was born in Philadelphia, Pennsylvania. He graduated from Central High School (Philadelphia), the Wharton School at the University of Pennsylvania and Temple University School of Law, both in Philadelphia, Pennsylvania.

== Legal and early political career ==
He entered the United States Naval Reserve and became a private practice lawyer, later becoming assistant district attorney of the city of Philadelphia from 1952 to 1954. He was elected to the Pennsylvania State House of Representatives, serving from 1954 to 1966, rising to the position of majority leader in 1965–1966. He was a delegate to the Democratic National Conventions of 1960, 1964 and 1968, and was the Democratic ward leader for the fifty-fourth ward of Philadelphia.

== Congress ==
He was elected in 1966 as a Democrat to the 90th and to the five succeeding Congresses. In 1974, Eilberg defeated Chris Matthews, future host of MSNBC's Hardball with Chris Matthews, in the Democratic primary. In 1978, he defeated Mark B. Cohen in the Democratic primary, before losing to Charles F. Dougherty. While in office, he served as the Chairman of the Judiciary Subcommittee on Immigration, Citizenship, and International Law. In that role, Representative Eilberg led a legislative veto to override the Attorney General's suspension of deportation of Jagdish Rai Chadha and five others under the Immigration and Nationality Act. The Supreme Court later found the legislative veto unconstitutional in INS v. Chadha, 462 U.S. 919 (1983).

== Controversy, indictment and guilty plea ==
In 1978, then-U.S. Attorney David W. Marston investigated Eilberg for money he received in connection with a federal grant to Hahnemann University Hospital in Philadelphia. Eilberg contacted the Carter White House, and Marston was later fired. Eilberg lost his 1978 reelection bid, and, three months later, pleaded guilty to conflict of interest charges. He was sentenced to five years of probation and a $10,000 fine.

== Personal life ==
He was married to a social worker named Gladys. They had a daughter, Amy Eilberg, who is the first female rabbi ordained in Conservative Judaism, and a son, William.

== Death ==
Eilberg died in Philadelphia on March 24, 2004, of complications of Parkinson’s Disease.

== See also ==
- List of American federal politicians convicted of crimes
- List of federal political scandals in the United States
- List of Jewish members of the United States Congress

== Notes ==
U.S. House of Representatives
Preceded by Herman Toll	Member of the U.S. House of Representatives from Pennsylvania's 4th congressional district 1967–1979	Succeeded by Charles F. Dougherty
