= Donald W. Fox =

American politician from Pennsylvania (1922–2021)

Donald William Fox

Member of the Pennsylvania House of Representatives from the 10th district
- In office January 7, 1969 – November 30, 1974
- Preceded by: District Created
- Succeeded by: Ralph Pratt

Member of the Pennsylvania House of Representatives from the Lawrence County district
- In office January 2, 1957 – November 30, 1968

Personal details
- Born: May 28, 1922 Hillsville, Pennsylvania, U.S.
- Died: April 22, 2021 (aged 98) Enon Valley, Pennsylvania, U.S.
- Party: Republican

Donald William Fox (May 28, 1922 – April 22, 2021) was an American politician who served as a member of the Pennsylvania House of Representatives, representing Lawrence County, Pennsylvania from 1957 until 1969, when he was elected to represent the 10th legislative district in Lawrence County, Pennsylvania.

== Formative years ==
Born in North Beaver Township, Lawrence County, Pennsylvania, Fox graduated from Mount Jackson Township High School in 1940, and earned his A.B. degree from Westminster College in 1944. A lieutenant with the United States Navy from 1943 to 1946 during World War II, he served aboard the USS Dauphin from 1944 to 1946. Professionally, he was employed in the dairy business, and was involved in the processing and distribution of milk and milk products.

== Political career ==
In 1956, he was elected to the Pennsylvania House of Representatives. During his nine consecutive terms, he served as Republican Caucus Secretary from 1971 to 1974, and was appointed to the Joint State Government Commission (from 1971 to 1974).

== Later life and death ==
Unsuccessful in his 1974 bid for reelection, he was hired as an instructor by Westminster College, and was then appointed to the State Board of Education, a post he held from 1976 to 1987.

He died in April 2021 at the age of 98.
