= Steve Crawford (Pennsylvania politician) =

American politician

Steven M. Crawford
- Born: July 13, 1959 (age 66); Columbia County, Pennsylvania, U.S.
- Education: Mansfield University of Pennsylvania
- Political party: Democrat

Steven M. Crawford (born July 13, 1959) is an American politician. He was a member of the cabinet of former Pennsylvania Governor Ed Rendell.

He graduated from the Mansfield University of Pennsylvania in 1981.

He was appointed to be chief of staff for Pennsylvania Governor Ed Rendell in May 2009 to replace the outgoing Gregory Fajt. He served as secretary of legislative affairs from 2003 through 2009. Prior to that, he was a staff member in the Pennsylvania House of Representatives. Prior to that, he was Deputy Secretary of the Pennsylvania Department of Agriculture under Governor Bob Casey Sr.

He was named to the Pennsylvania Report "PA Report 100" list of politically influential personalities in 2009. He was named to the PoliticsPA "Power 50" list.

Government offices
Preceded by Gregory Fajt	Chief of Staff for The Governor of Pennsylvania; 2009–2011	Succeeded by William Ward
Preceded by Patricia Welty; Acting	Secretary of Legislative Affairs for The Governor of Pennsylvania; 2003–2009	Succeeded by Colleen Kopp
