= John Estey =

American attorney

John H. Estey
- Born: Philadelphia, Pennsylvania
- Education: BA 1984 Carleton College; JD 1989 University of Pittsburgh
- Occupation: Attorney
- Political party: Democrat

John H. Estey is an attorney who served as chief of staff to Pennsylvania Governor Ed Rendell from 2003 until 2007. He served as interim president of the Milton Hershey School for the 2013–2014 school year and served as executive vice president – administration at Hershey Trust Company, in Hershey, Pennsylvania. Before joining Hershey Trust Company, Estey was a partner at Ballard Spahr LLP in Philadelphia, where he was a co-chair of the Government Relations and Regulatory Affairs Group. He has served as the chairman of the board of commissioners of the Delaware River Port Authority and as chairman of the board of directors of the Philadelphia Regional Port Authority He served as chairman of board of directors of the Independence Visitor Center in Philadelphia, and as a member of the boards of directors of the Gettysburg Foundation and the Greater Philadelphia Tourism Marketing Corporation.

He was named to the Pennsylvania Report "PA Report 100" list of politically influential personalities in 2003.

He was named to the PoliticsPA "Power 50" list. In 2010, Politics Magazine named him one of the "Top 10 Democrats" in Pennsylvania.

In May 2016, he was charged with wire fraud, having pocketed $13,000 that an FBI sting operation had given to him in an investigation into illegal lobbying of legislators. On May 10, 2016, he pleaded guilty to a single count of wire fraud, committed in 2011. On February 23, 2017, the Pennsylvania Supreme Court disbarred Estey.; he was reinstated to the practice of law on February 6, 2026.

Government offices
Preceded by Dave Sanko	Chief of Staff for The Governor of Pennsylvania; 2003–2007	Succeeded by Gregory C. Fajt
