= Roman Kozak (American politician) =

American politician (born 1988)

Member of the Pennsylvania House of Representatives from the 14th district
- Incumbent
- Assumed office January 7, 2025
- Preceded by: Jim Marshall

Personal details
- Born: c. 1988
- Party: Republican

Roman Kozak Jr. (born c. 1988) is an American politician who is the current representative for the 14th district in the Pennsylvania House of Representatives since 2025. He is a member of the Republican Party.

== Early life and education ==
Kozak graduated from Bethel Park High School in 2006 and received a Bachelor of Arts degree in political science from Geneva College in 2011.

== Political career ==
After graduating from college, Kozak worked as a legislative aide for Pennsylvania state representative Jim Christiana. In 2013, he unsuccessfully ran for a seat on the city council of Beaver Falls, Pennsylvania, but was appointed to the city's planning commission soon after. In 2016, Kozak served as campaign chair for Aaron Bernstine in his successful campaign for the state House. He later worked on Josh Kail's similarly successful run in 2018.

In 2023, Kozak, the chair of the Beaver County Republican Party and a social studies teacher with Pennsylvania Cyber Charter School, announced his campaign for the Pennsylvania state House after incumbent Jim Marshall announced his retirement ahead of the 2024 election. He defeated Democratic candidate Kenya Johns to represent the 14th district in the general election.

Kozak supports school vouchers and wants Pennsylvania to exit the Regional Greenhouse Gas Initiative, labelling the program "a ball and chain on our energy industry."
