= Mike Veon =

American politician

Michael R. Veon

Member of the Pennsylvania House of Representatives from the 14th district
- In office January 1, 1985 – November 30, 2006
- Preceded by: Barry Alderette
- Succeeded by: Jim Marshall

Democratic Whip of the Pennsylvania House of Representatives
- In office January 5, 1999 – November 30, 2006
- Preceded by: Ivan Itkin
- Succeeded by: Keith McCall

Personal details
- Born: January 19, 1957 (age 69) Beaver Falls, Pennsylvania
- Party: Democratic
- Spouse: Stephanie
- Education: Allegheny College
- Occupation: Lobbyist for Veon, Kopp and Associates

Michael R. Veon (born January 19, 1957) is a former member of the Pennsylvania House of Representatives, representing the 14th District from 1985 through 2006.

== Personal life ==
Veon is a 1975 graduate of Beaver Falls High School. Veon attended Allegheny College, where he graduated in 1979 with a degree in political science. In March 1977, he and six of his fraternity brothers were arrested after breaking into a half dozen mobile homes in Hadley, Pennsylvania, as a fraternity prank. Police charged the fraternity brothers with burglary, theft, and criminal conspiracy for taking furniture, a range and an oil furnace. They paid $1,500 in restitution and the charges were reduced to summary citations.

== Political career ==
After graduation, he worked for then-State Representative Joe Kolter's 1982 campaign for Pennsylvania's 4th congressional district. Kolter was successful, and Veon remained on Kolter's staff until 1984, when, at the age of 29, Veon resigned to run for state representative.

Veon defeated Barry Alderette, the man who succeeded Kolter in the 14th legislative district, by several hundred votes in a multi-candidate primary for the Democratic nomination. Alderette had raised the ire of Beaver County residents and opened the door for Veon with his support for a pay raise for House members.

As a young member of the Pennsylvania House of Representatives, Veon rose quickly through the ranks, forging a lasting alliance with Bill DeWeese. As a favorite of organized labor, he opposed replacement workers, and supported a hike in the minimum wage. He helped pass bills criminalizing sexual harassment and allowing women to seek pre-emptive Protection From Abuse orders. He sponsored the bill reserving mass transit seats for the disabled. In 1993, he pushed to repeal Pennsylvania's version of the Hatch Act, which prohibited public employees from campaigning on state time. As DeWeese ascended to the top of the Democratic leadership, Veon rose from Democratic policy chairman to be Democratic whip, the second-highest position in the caucus.

Even as his power increased in Harrisburg, Veon maintained focus on his constituents with a strong district office operation. In a 2002 PoliticsPA Feature story designating politicians with yearbook superlatives, he was named the "Hardest Working."

In 1992, Veon ran for the U.S. House of Representatives against his former boss, Joe Kolter, when Kolter was reported, in a taped conversation, as having made ethnic slurs and saying he would do anything for votes. Kolter was later implicated in the Congressional Post Office scandal. Veon came in second in a field of four candidates that also included Ron Klink, the victor, and fellow state Representative Frank LaGrotta.

In 2002, he was named to the PoliticsPA list of Best Dressed Legislators.

Veon lost his seat as the result of a pay raise controversy. After the Pennsylvania General Assembly raised its pay in a late-night vote, popular anger caused the legislature to repeal the pay raise, but Veon was the only member of either house to vote against repeal. All three individuals opposing Veon — one in the Democratic primary, and two in the Republican — publicly opposed the pay raise, but he strongly defended his actions, saying that the increased compensation was only right for the amount of work required of a state legislator. Although Veon won his primary election, he was defeated by Republican Jim Marshall, a member of the Big Beaver borough council who saw his victory as the result of votes against Veon, rather than primarily votes for him.

== Indictments and conviction ==
Michael R. Veon
- Born: January 19, 1957 (age 69); Beaver Falls, Pennsylvania, U.S.
- Occupation: Pennsylvania State Representative
- Status: released
- Convictions: 14 counts of conflict of interest, theft by deception, conspiracy and theft of services
- Penalty: six to fourteen years imprisonment

=== July 2008 ===
On July 10, 2008, Pennsylvania Attorney General Tom Corbett announced that his office filed criminal charges against 12 individuals connected to the 2006 Pennsylvania General Assembly bonus controversy. Veon, who had been the House minority whip at the time of the alleged crimes, was charged with 11 counts each of conflict of interest, theft by unlawful taking or disposition, theft of services, theft by deception, theft by failure to make required disposition of funds. The charges carry a maximum sentence of 381 years in prison and $805,000 in fines.

=== March 2009 ===
On March 25, 2009, Attorney General Corbett announced further charges of corruption, unrelated to the previous charges, were filed against Veon and associate Annamarie Perretta-Rosepink. The indictment includes 25 counts of theft, and one count each of conflict of interest and criminal conspiracy against Veon and three counts of theft and one count each of conflict of interest, criminal conspiracy and misapplication of entrusted property against Perretta-Rosepink. The charges stem from millions on dollars in state money funneled through earmarks for local economic development into the nonprofit Beaver Initiative for Growth, founded by Veon and former state Senator Gerald LaValle in 1992, and used the money for his own personal and political gain, including such things as bonus checks for employees who performed political campaign work.

=== Verdict ===
On March 23, 2010, after a week of deliberation, a Dauphin County jury found Veon guilty on 14 counts related to using taxpayer-paid bonuses to reward state workers for campaign efforts, illegal campaign fund-raising, other campaign efforts and a single count of conflict-of-interest for having aides drive two motorcycles to a North Dakota rally. Also convicted were two former aides, Brett Cott, found guilty on three counts, and Annamarie Perretta-Rosepink, found guilty on five counts. A third aide, Stephen Keefer, was acquitted of all charges against him. Veon's attorney, Dan Raynak, vowed to appeal. On June 18, 2010, Veon was sentenced to six to fourteen years imprisonment by Common Pleas Judge Richard A. Lewis.

=== Incarceration ===
In July 2010 Veon was imprisoned in the State Correctional Institution – Laurel Highlands minimum security prison, where he was assigned to a block typically containing prisoners needing more supervision, rather than white-collar criminals who follow the rules. Veon's job was that of a tutor, which paid $0.42 per hour.

=== Release ===
In June 2015, Mike Veon was released on parole from prison. Veon received early release for good behavior while in prison, with an assessment indicating he was not a threat to the community and accepted responsibility for his crimes. Among the conditions of his release, Veon will remain on parole for up to nine years.

On appeal, the Supreme Court of Pennsylvania cited errors in the trial judges' instructions to the jury and called Veon's original conviction a "criminalization of politics" and a new trial on all counts was ordered(2016)
