= Pennsylvania House of Representatives, District 14 =

American legislative district

Pennsylvania's 14th State House of Representatives district
Representative
Roman Kozak; R–Beaver
- Population (2022): 66,854

The 14th Pennsylvania House of Representatives District is located in western Pennsylvania and has been represented by Republican Roman Kozak since 2025.

== District profile ==
The 14th Pennsylvania House of Representatives District is located in Beaver County and includes the following areas:

- Beaver Falls
- Big Beaver
- Bridgewater
- Chippewa Township
- Darlington
- Darlington Township
- Daugherty Township
- Eastvale
- Economy
- Ellwood City (Beaver County Portion)
- Fallston
- Franklin Township
- Homewood
- Koppel
- Marion Township
- New Brighton
- New Galilee
- New Sewickley Township
- Patterson Heights
- Patterson Township
- Pulaski Township
- West Mayfield
- White Township

== Representatives ==
Representative	Party	Years	District home	Note
Prior to 1969, seats were apportioned by county.
Joseph P. Kolter	Democrat	1969 – 1982	New Brighton	Elected to the United States House of Representatives
Barry L. Alderette	Democrat	1983 – 1984		Unsuccessful candidate for reelection
Mike Veon	Democrat	1985 – 2006		Unsuccessful candidate for reelection
Jim E. Marshall	Republican	2007 – 2024	Big Beaver	Retired
Roman Kozak	Republican	2025 – present	Beaver	Incumbent

== Recent election results ==
PA House election, 2024: Pennsylvania House, District 14
Party	Candidate	Votes	%
Republican	Roman Kozak	24,149	65.36
Democratic	Kenya Johns	12,796	34.64
Total votes		36,945	100.00
Republican hold			

PA House election, 2022: Pennsylvania House, District 14
Party	Candidate	Votes	%
Republican	Jim Marshall (incumbent)	19,781	67.78
Democratic	Bruce Carper	9,402	32.22
Total votes		29,183	100.00
Republican hold			

PA House election, 2020: Pennsylvania House, District 14
Party	Candidate	Votes	%
Republican	Jim Marshall (incumbent)	24,961	69.65
Democratic	Zachary Wilson	10,878	30.35
Total votes		35,839	100.00
Republican hold			

PA House election, 2018: Pennsylvania House, District 14
Party	Candidate	Votes	%
Republican	Jim Marshall (incumbent)	16,260	63.09
Democratic	Amy Fazio	9,514	36.91
Total votes		25,774	100.00
Republican hold			

PA House election, 2016: Pennsylvania House, District 14
Party	Candidate	Votes	%
Republican	Jim Marshall (incumbent)	Unopposed	
Total votes		29,499	100.00
Republican hold			

PA House election, 2014: Pennsylvania House, District 14
Party	Candidate	Votes	%
Republican	Jim Marshall (incumbent)	Unopposed	
Total votes		17,597	100.00
Republican hold			

PA House election, 2012: Pennsylvania House, District 14
Party	Candidate	Votes	%
Republican	Jim Marshall (incumbent)	Unopposed	
Total votes		23,250	100.00
Republican hold			

PA House election, 2010: Pennsylvania House, District 14
Party	Candidate	Votes	%
Republican	Jim Marshall (incumbent)	11,602	67.46
Democratic	Dennis Powell	5,597	32.54
Total votes		17,199	100.00
Republican hold			
