= Charles F. Dougherty =

American politician

Charles Dougherty
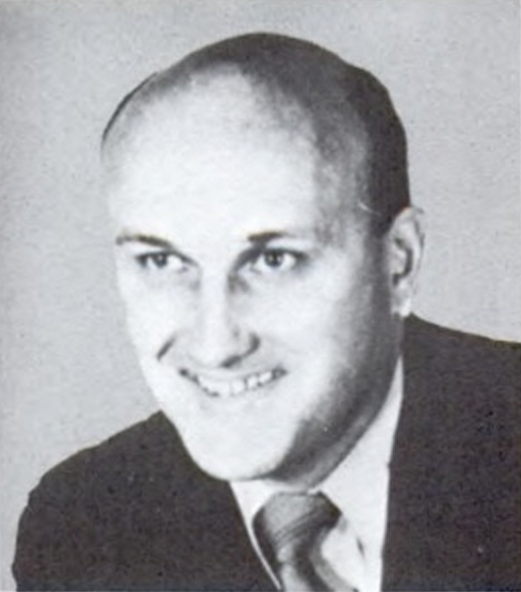

Member of the U.S. House of Representatives from Pennsylvania's 4th district
- In office January 3, 1979 – January 3, 1983
- Preceded by: Joshua Eilberg
- Succeeded by: Joseph Kolter

Member of the Pennsylvania Senate from the 5th district
- In office January 2, 1973 – January 15, 1979
- Preceded by: Herbert McGlinchy
- Succeeded by: James Lloyd

Personal details
- Born: Charles Francis Dougherty; June 26, 1937 (age 89) Philadelphia, Pennsylvania, U.S.
- Party: Republican
- Education: Saint Joseph's University (BS); University of Pennsylvania; Temple University

Charles Francis Dougherty (born June 26, 1937) is an American politician from Pennsylvania who served as a Republican member of the U.S. House of Representatives for Pennsylvania's 4th congressional district from 1979 to 1983.

== Early life and education ==
Dougherty was born in Philadelphia and attended St. Helena's School. He graduated from St. Joseph's Preparatory School in 1955. He served in the United States Marine Corps Reserve, 1957-77 (active duty, 1959–62). He graduated from St. Joseph's College with a B.S. degree in 1959 and did graduate work at the University of Pennsylvania from 1962 to 1964. He worked as a high school teacher from 1962 to 1965. In 1965 to 1966 he was a special agent for the Office of Naval Intelligence, Department of the Navy. He conducted additional graduate work at Temple University in 1967. He was assistant dean of the Community College of Philadelphia from 1966 to 1970, and a high school principal from 1970 to 1972.

== Career ==
He served in the Pennsylvania State Senate for the 5th district from 1972 to 1979.

Dougherty was elected in 1978 and reelected in 1980 as a Republican to the 96th and 97th United States Congresses. In 1978, he defeated Joshua Eilberg who was indicted on charges for money he took while arranging a $14.5 million Federal grant to a Philadelphia hospital.

He was defeated in 1982 by State Representative Robert Borski after his district was renumbered as the 3rd District. He ran against Borski again in 1992, 1998 and 2000, and was defeated each time. He also ran in Republican primaries for Mayor of Philadelphia in 1983 and his former House seat in 1986 and as well as for Philadelphia City Council in 1995.

To date, Dougherty is the last Republican to represent a Philadelphia-based district in Congress. He would be the last Republican to represent any portion of Philadelphia in the House until the 2000 Census resulted in the Bucks County-based 8th District absorbing a small portion of Philadelphia.

== Sources ==
- United States Congress. "Charles F. Dougherty (id: D000446)". Biographical Directory of the United States Congress.

U.S. House of Representatives
Preceded by Joshua Eilberg	Member of the U.S. House of Representatives from Pennsylvania's 4th congressional district 1979–1983	Succeeded by Joseph Kolter
U.S. order of precedence (ceremonial)
Preceded by Michael Myers as Former U.S. Representative	Order of precedence of the United States as Former U.S. Representative	Succeeded by Chris Carney as Former U.S. Representative
