= Frank Pecora =

American politician

Member of the Pennsylvania Senate from the 44th district
- In office January 2, 1979 – November 30, 1994
- Preceded by: Thomas Nolan
- Succeeded by: Jim Gerlach

Personal details
- Born: August 8, 1930 Pittsburgh, Pennsylvania, United States
- Died: June 12, 2017 (aged 86) Penn Hills, Pennsylvania
- Party: Democratic (1992–2017)
- Other political affiliations: Republican (1979–1992)

Frank Anthony Pecora (August 8, 1930 – June 12, 2017) was a member of the Pennsylvania State Senate who represented the 44th District from 1979 to 1994.

== Political career ==
Pecora was first elected to the Senate in 1978.

Several prominent Pennsylvania Democrats previously worked for Pecora, including former State Senator Sean Logan and Congressman Michael Doyle.

=== Reapportionment ===
Pecora, as a political moderate, had fallen out of favor with his party's leadership by the early 1990s, despite the fact that he had served over thirteen years in the State Senate as a member of the Republican Party. In 1991, the Republican-controlled legislature passed a reapportionment plan that dismantled his old district, instead shifting his district number several hundred miles (over 400 km) to the east from Allegheny County to Chester County. Determined to continue in the Senate, Pecora rented an apartment in Chester County, and continued serving his new constituents.

=== Party switch ===
By late 1992, Republicans held a 26-24 majority in the chamber. Pecora, still upset with the reapportionment decision, decided to switch parties and vote with the Democrats. He ran as the Democratic candidate in Pennsylvania's 18th congressional district, which included much of his old state senate district. However, he was defeated by Republican incumbent and future U. S. Senator Rick Santorum, even though the district had three times as many Democrats as Republicans. He did not have to give up his state senate seat to run for Congress; Pennsylvania state senators serve staggered four-year terms, and Pecora was not up for reelection until 1994.

With Pecora remaining in the Senate, his party switch changed the state senate's partisan makeup to an even 25-25 after the 1992 elections, allowing Democratic Lieutenant Governor Mark Singel to cast the tie-breaking vote that allowed Democrats to gain control of the chamber. Republican Bob Jubelirer, who lost his position as President pro tempore of the body to Bob Mellow, characterized the decision as "a knife in the back".

=== Retirement and death ===
Pecora announced prior to the 1994 elections that he would not seek re-election in his new district. His former seat was won by Republican State Representative Jim Gerlach (who was later elected to Congress), helping Republicans regain control of the Senate. He died on June 12, 2017.
