= Chris Lilik =

American political activist

- Born: Rochester, Minnesota, U.S.
- Known for: GrassrootsPA, Young Conservatives of Pennsylvania or YCOP

Chris Lilik is a political activist from the U.S. state of Pennsylvania.

Of Polish, Pennsylvania Dutch, and Ukrainian descent, he attended Villanova University and law school at Duquesne University.

He interned for J.C. Watts. He is editor of the Pennsylvania political news website GrassrootsPA.com and is state chairman of the Young Conservatives of Pennsylvania.

In 2004, BusinessWeek called him a "one-man political action committee." He was a grassroots organizer for Pat Toomey's 2004 primary race against Arlen Specter. In 2010, Politics Magazine named him one of the most influential Republicans in Pennsylvania, describing his website as "Pennsylvania's Drudge Report."
