= Hillsville, Pennsylvania =

Unincorporated community in Pennsylvania, US

- Unincorporated community
- Location within Pennsylvania Location within the United States
- Coordinates: 41°00′28″N 80°29′48″W
- Country: United States
- State: Pennsylvania
- County: Lawrence
- Township: Mahoning
- Elevation: 1,129 ft (344 m)
- Time zone: UTC-5 (Eastern (EST))
  - Summer (DST): UTC-4 (EDT)
- ZIP code: 16132
- Area codes: 724, 878
- GNIS feature ID: 1177125

Hillsville is an unincorporated community in Lawrence County, Pennsylvania, United States. The community is 7.8 miles (12.6 km) west of New Castle and 1.2 miles (1.9 km) east of the border between Pennsylvania and Ohio. It is on the south side of the Mahoning River at the top of an approximately 0.4 miles (0.64 km) very steep road grade up Churchill Road from river level that passes over U.S. Route 224 by a bridge along the way. US 224 is the primary highway for travel to larger towns, and it passes just to the north of and somewhat lower than the community. There is a substandard interchange with Churchill Road within the steep portion of the grade. Hillsville has a post office with ZIP code 16132.

== Demographics ==
Historical population
Census	Pop.	Note	%±

The United States Census Bureau defined Hillsville as a census designated place (CDP) in 2023.

== Notable residents ==
- Donald W. Fox (1922–2021), Pennsylvania House of Representatives member
