= 2005 Pennsylvania General Assembly pay raise controversy =

In the early morning hours of July 7, 2005, the Pennsylvania General Assembly passed pay increases for state lawmakers, judges, and top executive-branch officials. The vote took place at 2 am without public review or commentary, and Governor Ed Rendell signed the bill into law. The raise increased legislators' base pay from 16% to 34% depending on position.

== Provisions ==
The pay raise included a provision allowing legislators to take their raises immediately in the form of "unvouchered expenses." This provision was included due to the Pennsylvania Constitution's clause prohibiting legislators from taking salary increases in the same term as which they are passed. State courts have ruled similar legislation to be constitutional on three separate occasions.

== Reaction ==
Outrage over the pay raise was picked up by several influential state blogs like Grassrootspa and PennPatriot Blog. Advocacy groups spawned several grass-roots movements, some geared toward voting out incumbents and some seeking support for a Constitutional Convention or a reduction in the size of the legislature. The legislature repealed the pay raise after four months by a 50–0 vote in the Senate and 197–1 vote in the House.

=== Gene Stilp ===
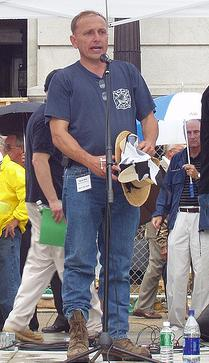
Gene Stilp at an anti-pay raise rally in front of the Pennsylvania Capitol

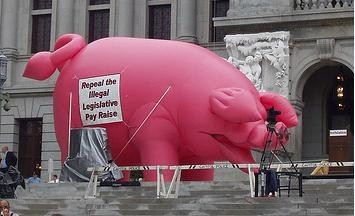
The Payraise Pig, one of Stilp's political props, in front of the Pennsylvania State Capitol in 2005.

Eugene Paul Stilp (born July 1, 1950) is a Pennsylvanian reformer and activist, former congressional candidate and current Democratic candidate for Pennsylvania's 125th State House of Representatives district. Stilp is best known for opposing the '2005 Pennsylvania General Assembly pay raise' and his combined use of targeted legal action and creative media-generating props to achieve political change in Pennsylvania. He was born in Wilkes-Barre.

==== Political advocacy ====
He is a non-practicing attorney who has filed many public advocacy suits against the government of Pennsylvania. He is best known as an opponent of the 2005 Pennsylvania General Assembly pay raise controversy.

The Philadelphia Inquirer named Stilp one of the three "Citizens of the Year" in 2005.

The Pennsylvania Report named him to the 2009 "The Pennsylvania Report 100" list of influential figures in Pennsylvania politics.

Stilp designed the Flight 93 Memorial Flag.

He was praised by Ralph Nader for his use of props for political activism.

In 2024, Stilp filed a suit to disqualify Congressman Scott Perry from running for re-election because of Perry's efforts to help overturn the 2020 presidential election, citing the Insurrection clause. Stilp withdrew the suit after the U.S. Supreme Court ruled that only Congress can disqualify federal candidates.

In 2025, Stilp headed a demonstration opposed to the reopening of the Three Mile Island Nuclear Generating Station.

==== Statue of Liberty replica ====
Stilp built and installed a replica of the Statue of Liberty on a pier of the late Marysville Bridge in the Dauphin Narrows of Susquehanna River north of Harrisburg. It was made of venetian blinds and stood 18 feet (5.5 m) tall. Six years later, after it was destroyed in a windstorm, it was rebuilt by Stilp and other local citizens, of wood, metal, glass and fiberglass, to a height of 25 feet (7.6 m).

==== 2012 congressional campaign ====
Stilp announced in January 2012 that he would seek the Democratic nomination to challenge Republican incumbent Lou Barletta in Pennsylvania's 11th congressional district. In the April 2012 primary, Stilp won 54.6% of the vote defeating Wilkes-Barre attorney Bill Vinsko. Vinsko's campaign spending far outpaced Stilp's; Vinsko spent $102,463 to Stilp's $13,814.

On October 31, 2012, Gene Stilp was endorsed by the greater Harrisburg, PA area by The Patriot-News. This article is titled "Give Gene Stilp a chance: Activist makes sense for 11th District." In the article, Gene is heralded for protesting against government excess and acting upon it. For example, after Pennsylvania lawmakers enacted a late-night pay raise in 2005, Stilp was the one who filed the lawsuit and won part of the state Supreme Court case against the method used to award the pay increases. While there are many examples of Gene's candor and resolve, he continues to champion higher education and job creation, a vitally important and current issue in Pennsylvania.

On November 3, 2012, right on the heels of the endorsement by the Harrisburg Patriot-News, Gene Stilp was endorsed by the Citizens' Voice, one of the largest and influential newspapers in the 11th Congressional District. The major points the article goes on to say in its endorsement for Gene as a candidate representative of the 11th Congressional District are as follows: Gene "has proven to be an effective taxpayer advocate and his positions on the issues," he "[will] protect Medicare benefits, supporting fairer taxes, implementing Obamacare", and he "[will] better reflect the interests of residents of the 11th Congressional District, which, after redistricting, now stretches from Wyoming County in the north to Cumberland County in the south."

== Political aftermath ==
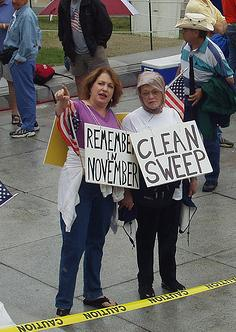
Protestors from PACleanSweep in front of the Pennsylvania State Capitol in 2005.

The first victim of the public uproar was Supreme Court Justice Russell M. Nigro, who became the first Pennsylvania Supreme Court justice to be denied retention. Nigro asserted that he had not taken part in the pay raise. However, critics noted that Chief Justice Ralph Cappy helped draft the bill and that prior Court opinions upheld such practices.

On November 16, 2005, Governor Rendell signed a repeal of the pay raise after a near-unanimous vote for repeal; only House Minority Whip Mike Veon voted against the repeal.

Despite the repeal, a total of 17 legislators were defeated in the 2006 primary elections, including Senate President Pro Tempore Robert Jubelirer and Senate Majority Leader David J. Brightbill. They were the first top-ranking Pennsylvania legislative leaders to lose a primary election since 1964.

The November 2006 general election claimed several more members who supported the pay raise, including Republican representatives Gene McGill, Matt Wright, Tom Gannon and Matthew Good and Democrat Veon. The defeats were widely attributed to anger over the pay raise.

Frank LaGrotta, who was defeated in the 2006 primary election over the pay raise issue, was one of many legislators who were paying back their unvouchered expenses in installments. After pleading guilty to two counts of conflict of interest for hiring relatives as "ghost employees," he stopped repayment and was even refunded the amount that he had previously returned.

== Legacy ==
In November 2009, Barbara McIlvaine Smith announced that she would not run for re-election in 2010, saying that she was frustrated with the progress of the post-pay raise reform movement. However, she ultimately did run for re-election in 2010 and lost to Republican challenger Dan Truitt.

== See also ==
- 2006 Pennsylvania General Assembly bonus controversy
- Russ Diamond
- Eric Epstein
- Drew Crompton
- Chris Lilik
- List of Pennsylvania state legislatures
