= Ron Klink =

American politician (born 1951)

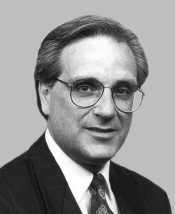

Member of the U.S. House of Representatives from Pennsylvania's 4th district
- In office January 3, 1993 – January 3, 2001
- Preceded by: Joseph Kolter
- Succeeded by: Melissa Hart

Personal details
- Born: Ronald Paul Klink; September 23, 1951 (age 75) Canton, Ohio, U.S.
- Party: Democratic
- Spouse: Linda Hogan (m. 1977)

Ronald Paul Klink (born September 23, 1951) is an American television broadcaster and politician and who served four terms as a United States representative from Pennsylvania from 1993 to 2001, as member of the Democratic Party.

== Early life and career ==
Klink was born in Canton, Ohio, and graduated from Meyersdale High School in Pennsylvania in 1969. He married Linda Loree Hogan in Greensburg, Pennsylvania, on August 27, 1977.

=== Broadcasting career ===
Klink originally worked behind the scenes at WTAJ-TV in Altoona, Pennsylvania from 1976 to 1977 and then became weatherman plus fill-in sports anchor until his departure for Pittsburgh in July 1978. He later became a recognizable figure in the Pittsburgh area as a television news weatherman and reporter on KDKA-TV from 1978 to 1991.

== Congress ==
In 1992, Klink sought the Democratic nomination for the 4th District and defeated five-term incumbent Joe Kolter in the primary. He was easily elected in November and served four terms in the House, never winning less than 64 percent of the vote. Klink was popular within his district as a moderate Democrat with strong labor ties.

=== 2000 Senate campaign ===
In 2000, he left his House seat to run unsuccessfully for the Senate against incumbent Rick Santorum. Klink lost the race by five points. Klink was virtually unknown on the eastern side of Pennsylvania (including the important Philadelphia area). Other contributing factors included his conservative stances on social issues and the fact that he had to spend a large amount of money in the crowded Democratic primary.

== After Congress ==
He had been mentioned as a possible candidate for his own congressional seat against the person who succeeded him, Republican Melissa Hart. However, in December 2005, Klink announced he would not run.

According to then-Congressman Curt Weldon in his book Countdown to Terror, in 2003, Klink offered Weldon the identity of an intelligence source with information on Iraqi uranium purchases. The agent was thought to be Iranian arms dealer Manucher Ghorbanifar. The intelligence reportedly later proved to be fabricated.

In 2026, he announced that he was diagnosed with amyloidosis, making him the fourth major Pennsylvania political figure to be diagnosed with the disease; Richard Caliguiri and Louis J. Tullio, the respective mayors of Pittsburgh and Erie, were diagnosed in the 1980s, while Governor Bob Casey Sr. was diagnosed in 1991. Klink currently serves as a senior policy advisor for the law firm of Nelson Mullins Riley & Scarborough.

== Electoral history ==
Pennsylvania's 4th congressional district: Results 1992–1998
Year	Democrat	Votes	Pct	Republican	Votes	Pct		3rd Party	Party	Votes	Pct
1992	Ron Klink	186,684	78%	Gordon R. Johnston	48,484	20%		Drew Ley	None of Above	2,754	1%
1994	Ron Klink	119,115	64%	Ed Peglow	66,509	36%	*				
1996	Ron Klink	142,621	64%	Paul T. Adametz	79,448	36%	*				
1998	Ron Klink	103,183	64%	Mike Turzai	58,485	36%	*				

*Write-in and minor candidate notes: In 1994, write-ins received 6 votes. In 1996, write-ins received 98 votes. In 1998, write-ins received 17 votes.

Pennsylvania Senator (Class I): 2000 results
Year	Democrat	Votes	Pct	Republican	Votes	Pct	3rd Party	Party	Votes	Pct	3rd Party	Party	Votes	Pct	3rd Party	Party	Votes	Pct
2000	Ron Klink	2,154,908	46%	Rick Santorum	2,481,962	52%	John J. Featherman	Libertarian	45,775	1%	Lester Searer	Constitution	28,382	1%	Robert Domske	Reform	24,089	1%

== See also ==
- 2000 United States Senate election in Pennsylvania

U.S. House of Representatives
Preceded by Joseph Kolter	Member of the U.S. House of Representatives from Pennsylvania's 4th congressional district 1993–2001	Succeeded by Melissa Hart
Party political offices
Preceded by Harris Wofford	Democratic nominee for U.S. Senator from Pennsylvania (Class 1); 2000	Succeeded by Bob Casey
U.S. order of precedence (ceremonial)
Preceded by Ann Kirkpatrick as Former U.S. Representative	Order of precedence of the United States as Former U.S. Representative	Succeeded by Don Sherwood as Former U.S. Representative
