= Joseph P. Kolter =

American politician (1926–2019)

Joe Kolter
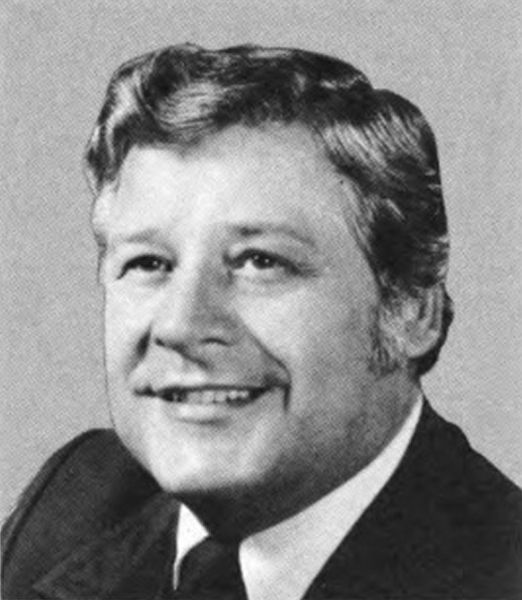

Member of the U.S. House of Representatives from Pennsylvania's 4th district
- In office January 3, 1983 – January 3, 1993
- Preceded by: Charles F. Dougherty
- Succeeded by: Ron Klink

Member of the Pennsylvania House of Representatives from the 14th district
- In office January 7, 1969 – November 30, 1982
- Preceded by: Constituency established
- Succeeded by: Barry L. Alderette

Personal details
- Born: Joseph Paul Kolter; September 3, 1926 McDonald, Ohio, U.S.
- Died: September 8, 2019 (aged 93) Hershey, Pennsylvania, U.S.
- Resting place: Sylvania Hills Memorial Park in Rochester, Pennsylvania
- Party: Democratic
- Spouse: Dorothy
- Children: 3
- Education: Geneva College (BS)

Military service
- Allegiance: United States
- Branch/service: United States Army
- Years of service: 1944–1947

Joseph Paul "Joe" Kolter (September 3, 1926 – September 8, 2019) was an American politician who served as a Democratic member of the United States House of Representatives for Pennsylvania from 1983 to 1993.

== Early life and career ==
Kolter was born in McDonald, Ohio. He graduated from New Brighton High School in 1944 and Geneva College in 1950.

He served in the United States Army Air Forces from 1944 to 1947.

He was a New Brighton city councilman from 1961 to 1965, and a member of the Pennsylvania House of Representatives from 1969 to 1982.

== Congress ==
A Democrat, Kolter was elected to the U.S. House of Representatives in 1982, defeating incumbent Eugene Atkinson, a Republican who had been elected twice as a Democrat, but switched parties in 1981. He was reelected four times, before he was defeated in the Democratic primary by Ron Klink in 1992.

=== Ethics and legal issues ===
Kolter was implicated in the Congressional Post Office scandal that also ensnared Ways and Means Committee chairman Dan Rostenkowski of Illinois. He pleaded guilty to conspiring with the House Postmaster to embezzle $9,300 in taxpayer funds and received a six-month prison sentence. Kolter was also fined $20,000 and ordered to pay restitution for the amount converted.

== Death ==
Kolter died on September 8, 2019, at age 93, in Hershey, Pennsylvania. His remains are interred at Sylvania Hills Memorial Park in Rochester, Pennsylvania.

== See also ==
- List of American federal politicians convicted of crimes
- List of federal political scandals in the United States

U.S. House of Representatives
Preceded by Charles F. Dougherty	Member of the U.S. House of Representatives from Pennsylvania's 4th congressional district 1983–1993	Succeeded by Ron Klink
