= Young Sherlock Holmes: Snake Bite =

Fifth novel in the Young Sherlock Holmes series

- First edition
- Author: Andy Lane
- Language: English
- Series: Young Sherlock Holmes
- Genre: Detective Fiction, Historical fiction, Juvenile Fiction
- Published: 27 September 2012 (Macmillan Publishers)
- Publication place: United Kingdom
- Pages: 294
- ISBN: 9781447265627
- Preceded by: Fire Storm
- Followed by: Knife Edge

Young Sherlock Holmes: Snake Bite is the fifth novel in the Young Sherlock Holmes series that depicts Arthur Conan Doyle's detective Sherlock Holmes as a teenager in the 1860s. It was written by author Andy Lane and released in 2013.

In this series Sherlock Holmes is described as a character without Dr. Watson and solve cases by himself in Shanghai, China. This series is based on the original Canon of Sherlock Holmes.

== Summary ==
There is a Diogenes club in a building where people have to remain quiet or otherwise, they might get kicked out. Amyus Crowe and Mycroft Holmes arrive in the building and then they find out that Sherlock has been kidnapped into a ship called Gloria Scott by the Paradol Chamber. There, Sherlock Holmes is like a worker who cleans the ship. He meets a friend, Wu Chung, who is the cook. There, he learns to cook, and tai chi which was vital when pirates invaded the ship. The ship was on its way to Shanghai, China and later on, it would return to England. He also befriended the Mackenzies and Jacobus Arrhenius. The Mackenzies consisted of Cameron Mackenzie, his father Malcolm Mackenzie, and Mrs. Mackenzie. In Arrhenius cabin, he spotted a bag. Then, all of them land in Shanghai and Sherlock roams around and then spies on the father, Malcolm suspiciously disguised as a Chinese rice planting farmer. After spying on him, Sherlock can't come to any conclusions. Then, Wu Chung gets sick and he dies. His wife and his son, Wu Fung-Yi tells Sherlock the news that Wu Chung is killed by snake bite. Sherlock sees that the way that Wu Chung is killed. The snake had one broken fang and it was really venomous. Later on, Malcolm Mackenzie is murdered by a snake. The way that the snake had stung Malcolm was as the exact same way as how it did for Wu Chung, one broken fang. A doctor, Dr. Forbes sees how he was stung and so Sherlock and Forbes prospect that the same snake must have stung the 2 guys and that it was very venomous. Next to Malcolm, there is a bag that Sherlock saw in Arrhenius's cabin. Sherlock sees that it is a bag of translucent photos, pictures of spider webs. There, he sees white spots and then he decides to arrange it and connect the dots as if though they are geometric shapes, but it turned out to be gibberish. Then, he decided to place the pictures over a map and read out the letters to decode it. After decoding, he realizes that there is a bomb aboard the USS. He then travels up the Yangtze and warns the captain and kills Arrhenius, the antagonist. Then, Sherlock, Cameron and Wu Chung's son live. It is then revealed that Amyus Crowe is forced to take on a new pupil to continue his earnings and the new pupil whose name is Aaron Wilson Jr. has now asked for Virginia’s hand in marriage, to which she agrees.

== Background ==
Based on the original Sherlock Holmes series, Doyle mentioned that he was an expert at martial arts so in this series, he uses his martial arts skill to fight villains he encountered in China all taught by the character, Wu Chung.

When author Lane wrote this book, he mentioned that there was a snake who came killing people but didn't leave any traces behind. It isn't necessary to read the book in order unlike the previous books, Death Cloud, Rebel Fire, Black Ice, and Fire Storm. The other previous books mention Mycroft, Matty, Virginia, Amyus Crowe, Rufus Stone, and the evil housekeeper, Mrs. Eglantine. Sherlock Holmes didn't just roam around alone, he just made friends like the Mackenzies and Wu Chung.

== Characters ==
- Sherlock Holmes, a detective who was kidnapped by the Paradol Chamber in a ship called Gloria Scott. He and a minor character, Dr. Forbes were able to find a detail to the solution of the snake bite.
- Wu Chung, the Chinese cook of the Gloria Scott ship and he is Sherlock's friends who taught him tai chi, Chinese cooking techniques, Cantonese, etc.
- Cameron Mackenzie, Sherlock's friend who lives in America but knows a bit of Cantonese and is good on his facts during this war period
- Malcolm Mackenzie, father of Cameron who later on dies and receives photos from Jacobus Arrhenius
- Jacobus Arrhenius, the antagonist of the book who has the argyria disease, had photos in his ship cabin that he gave to Malcolm which turned out to be clues

Note: Wu Chung, the Mackenzies, and Jacobus Arrhenius are only mentioned in this book and few of them die which brings the plot into setting.

== Author's sources to the book ==
The author used the original Canon of Sherlock Holmes to write this series. Author Doyle mentioned that Sherlock was a master when it came to boxing, swordsmanship, playing the violin, martial arts, chemistry and inspired of that, Andy Lane decided to write books based on these skills of Sherlock.

Since this book was set in China during the 19th century, Lane tried to get his information as accurate as possible by reading many books on China. Some useful books he cited were The Opium War: Drugs, Dreams and the Making of China written by Julia Lovell, The Scramble For China: Foreign Details in the Qing Empire, 19332-1914 written by Robert Bickers, Chinese Characters written by Sarah Lloyd, and the most useful book he sourced was A Lady's Captivity Among Chinese Pirates by Fanny Loviot. Andy Lane mentioned in this book about his silver skin due to his disease which is called argyria. One of the genres of this book is mystery, but it also historical fiction due to the USS Monocacy traveling to the Yangtze River, war, etc. The Gloria Scott isn't the same in Doyle's The Adventure of the Gloria Scott. Sherlock found the names Wu Chung and Wu Fung-Yi in the Wade-Giles system instead of the Pinyin system.

== Format ==
There are four main versions of this book which are kindle, paperback, hardcover, and ebook. The nine versions from Fantastic Fiction. There is a USA Hardback made in October 2014, a UK Hardback made in September 2012, USA Paperback made in December 2015, four different UK Paperback with one made in March 2014, two from 2012, and one from 2001, the USA Kindle edition made in October 2014, and the Canada, UK Kindle edition made in September 2012, all available on Amazon.com.

Book Title	Version	Date	Author	Publisher	Availability	Photo from
The Legend Begins Sherlock; Holmes Snake Bite (Sherlock Holmes: The; Legend Begins)	USA Paperback	Dec 2015	Andy Lane	Square Fish	Amazon.com	?
Young Sherlock; Holmes: Snake Bite	UK Paperback	Mar 2013	Andy Lane	Galaxy	Amazon.com	?
Snake Bite (Young; Sherlock Holmes)	UK Paperback	2001	Andy Lane	MacMillan; Publishers	Amazon.com	?
Snake Bite (Young; Sherlock Holmes)	UK Paperback	Sep 2012	Andy Lane	MacMillan; Publishers	Amazon.com	?
Snake Bite (Young; Sherlock Holmes)	UK Hardback	Sep 2012	Andy Lane	MacMillan; Publishers	Amazon.com	?
Snake Bite	UK Paperback	Sep 2012	Andy Lane	MacMillan; Publishers	Amazon.com	?
Snake Bite (Young Sherlock; Holmes Book 5)	Canada, UK Kindle Edition	Sep 2012	Andy Lane	MacMillan; Publishers	Amazon.com	?
Snake Bite (Sherlock Holmes: The; Legend Begins Book 5)	USA Kindle Edition	Oct 2014	Andy Lane	Farrar, Straus and Giroux (BYR)	Amazon.com	?
Snake Bite (Sherlock Holmes: The Legend Begins)	USA Hardback	Oct 2014	Andy Lane	Farrar, Straus and Giroux (BYR)	Amazon.com	?

== Critical response ==
The Book Zone quoted on the Snake Bite book, "Five books in Andrew Lane's Young Sherlock Holmes just seem to get better and better. I raced through the latest in a single sitting, and yet again I was wanting to left wanting more." Many people commented on Goodreads.com that this book was the best in the series, the plot was really interesting and attention grabbing, the way that he got kidnapped to China, learned a bit of Chinese etc. made the book unique and wonderful. This Goodreads rated this book 4.13 out of 5 stars, Amazon rated this book 4.8 out of 5 stars, BookTrust rated it 5 out of 5 stars. had reviews from ages 7–15 saying that it had interesting elements, well the climax and introduction, it was exciting to read about Sherlock written in this century, for teenagers, and with wonderful genres. Ms. Yingling Reads said that this book had its strengths and weaknesses. The weaknesses were that there were different kinds of cover for this book which made it look unorganized but the strengths were its plentiful action and mystery including good characters, too.
