= Young Sherlock Holmes: Fire Storm =

2011 book by Andrew Lane

- First edition cover
- Author: Andy Lane
- Language: English
- Series: Young Sherlock Holmes
- Genre: Detective novel
- Published: 2011 (Macmillan Books)
- Publication place: United Kingdom
- Pages: 339
- Preceded by: Black Ice
- Followed by: Snake Bite

Young Sherlock Holmes: Fire Storm is the fourth novel in the Young Sherlock Holmes series. It was written by Andy Lane and released in 2011.

== Plot ==
The story begins with Sherlock Holmes discovering that Mrs. Eglantine, the housekeeper of Holmes Manor, is blackmailing his Uncle Sherrinford and Aunt Anna into keeping her employed. Sherlock also discovers that Mrs. Eglantine is working for Josh Harkness, the town's sinister blackmailer. Sherlock, along with his best friend Matthew Arnatt, pursue Harkness into a tannery, which is Harkness' base of operations. There, Sherlock and Matty discover a large number of boxes which contain secrets that Harkness uses for blackmail, including the secret of the Holmes family, and destroys them by sliding them into a tannery vat. Sherlock then incapacitates Harkness and turns him in to the police. Sherlock returns home and reveals the news to Aunt Anna and Uncle Sherrinford, prompting them to fire Mrs. Eglantine since she does not have evidence for blackmail.

After that, Sherlock and Matty visit his American tutor, Amyus Crowe and his daughter Virginia. When they arrive at Crowe's cottage, they find it empty and that they are not there. However, Sherlock and Matty discover a clue that points to Edinburgh. Sherlock, Matty, and Rufus Stone (Sherlock's violin tutor) set off to Edinburgh. However, Rufus gets abducted in Newcastle, leaving Sherlock and Matty alone. In Edinburgh, Sherlock decodes a coded newspaper advertisement that leads them to Cramond. But Sherlock and Matty get abducted by a man named Bryce Scobell, who is holding Rufus Stone captive. Scobell tortures Sherlock for information about Crowe's whereabouts. However, Sherlock, Matty, and Rufus escape after Sherlock incapacitates Scobell's men. The trio set off to Cramond, where they find Crowe and Virginia. Crowe reveals that four years ago, Bryce Scobell, who was serving as a lieutenant in the Confederate Army, had led a large massacre against the American Indians. Crowe, who was a bounty hunter at that time, was assigned to hunt down and kill Scobell for causing the massacre. During an ambush against Scobell, Crowe accidentally kills the wife and son of Scobell, who swears revenge against Crowe, who then quits his job and moves to England. With Scobell back to seek revenge, Crowe and Virginia flee from Farnham.

Soon after, Scobell and his men arrive and set fire to Crowe's hideout, causing the five of them to move out into the open. They escape, but get separated (with Sherlock and Virginia together and Crowe, Rufus, and Matty together in the other group). Sherlock and Virginia find a shelter, where they spend the night. The next morning, Sherlock and Virginia get kidnapped by a local criminal gang called the Black Reavers. They are taken to a warehouse, where they find Crowe, Rufus, and Matty. The leader, Gahan Macfarlane, reveals that he was hired by Scobell to capture the group and return them to Scobell. Sherlock offers a deal: He will prove the innocence of Macfarlane's sister, who is accused of murder, in exchange for their release. After Sherlock succeeds, he returns to Macfarlane's base, where Scobell arrives.

As Scobell is about to kill Crowe and Virginia, Sherlock incapacitates Scobell, initiating chaos. Sherlock sets loose a bear, which kills Scobell. After that, Sherlock, Matty, Crowe, Virginia, and Rufus return to Farnham.

== Reception ==
Starburst magazine gave the novel a rating of 4 stars out of 10, and said that the novel is written in an "easy, breezy style that's not so easy and breezy that it jars with the Victorian setting". The review also praised the dialogue. However, it also commented that the book does not do as good of a job at determining the setting, claiming that the chosen settings for Young Sherlock Holmes: Fire Storm were less dark than the original stories. The matter-of-fact tone used in writing the novel was also criticized. The character of Sherlock Holmes is criticized for a lack of eccentricity as compared to the original character. However, Fire Storm is mentioned as having less of this problem than the earlier books in the Young Sherlock Holmes series. It is also commented that this is understandable from a publishing point of view. The Starburst review praised the action sequences in the novel, but stated that the riddle-solving parts of the novel were boring.

== Background ==
Author Andy Lane first got the idea to use Edinburgh as a setting in a book in the Young Sherlock Holmes series while visiting Edinburgh and observing Castle Rock. Lane writes in an author's note that he imagined Sherlock climbing Castle Rock to save someone, and this was what prompted him to set the book in Edinburgh. Lane learned much of the historical background for the novel from Michael Fry's book Edinburgh - a History of the City.

== Characters ==
- Sherlock Holmes. He is considerably more normal than in the original stories that were written by Sir Arthur Conan Doyle. The character also displays political correctness and thinks negatively about Victorian England's social system. He displays a progressive social view.
- Matty Arnatt. Sherlock's friend and sidekick. He is chatty and provides various tidbits of information.
- Mycroft Holmes. Sherlock's older brother, who works for the British Government.

== Format ==
These are the Fantastic Fiction results.

Book Title	Version	Date	Author	Publisher	Availability	Photo from here
Fire Storm	UK Paperback	Oct 2011	Andy Lane	Macmillan Groups	Amazon	?
Young Sherlock Holmes 4: Fire Storm	UK Paperback	Oct 2011	Andy Lane	Macmillan Groups	Amazon	?
Young Sherlock Holmes: Fire Storm	UK Paperback	May 2012	Andy Lane	Galaxy	Amazon	?
Fire Storm (Young Sherlock Holmes)	UK Paperback	October 2014	Andy Lane	Macmillan Groups	Amazon	?
Fire Storm (Young Sherlock Holmes)	UK Paperback	June 2014	Andy Lane	Macmillan Groups	Amazon	?
Young Sherlock Holmes 4: Fire Storm	UK Hardback	Oct 2014	Andy Lane	Macmillan Groups	Amazon	?
Fire Storm	UK Paperback	Oct 2014	Andy Lane	Macmillan Groups	Amazon	?
Fire Storm	USA Audio Edition	October 2013	Andy Lane	Macmillan Groups	Amazon	?
Fire Storm (Sherlock Holmes: The Legend Begins)	USA Audio CD	October 2013	Andy Lane	Macmillan Groups	Amazon	?
Fire Storm (Sherlock Holmes: The Legend Begins)	USA Paperback	October 2014	Andy Lane	Square Fish	Amazon	?
Fire Storm (Sherlock Holmes: The Legend Begins)	USA Hardback	October 2013	Andy Lane	Farrar, Straus and Giroux	Amazon	?
Fire Storm (Sherlock Holmes: The Legend Begins Book 4)	USA Kindle Edition	October 2013	Andy Lane	Farrar, Straus and Giroux	Amazon	?

== See also ==
- Young Sherlock Holmes: Red Leech
- Young Sherlock Holmes: Death Cloud
