= First ladies of Pennsylvania =

Wives of governors and presidents of the U.S. state of Pennsylvania

First Lady of Pennsylvania
- Incumbent; Lori Shapiro since January 17, 2023
- Inaugural holder: Elizabeth Fishbourne
- Formation: 1777
- Website: First Lady

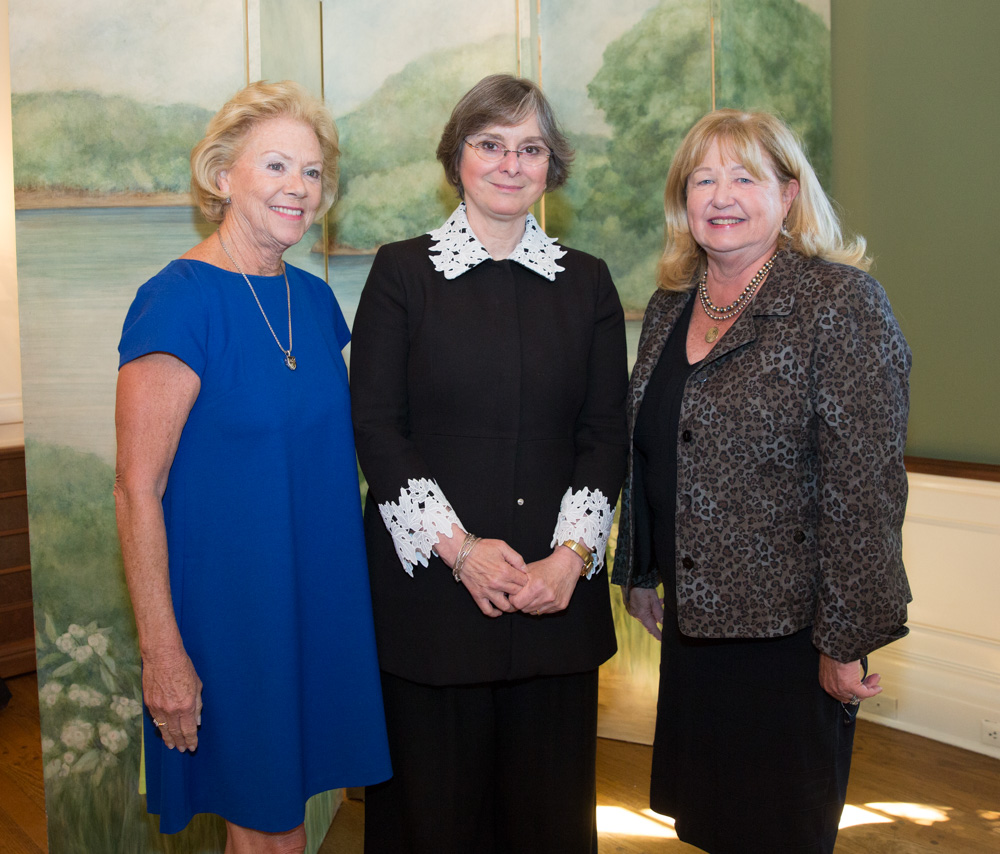
Former Pennsylvania First Ladies Midge Rendell, Frances Wolf, and Michele Ridge in October 2017.

The first lady of Pennsylvania is the title attributed to the wife of the governor of Pennsylvania. The honorary position is styled as First Lady or First Gentleman of the Commonwealth of Pennsylvania. To date there have been no female governors of Pennsylvania, and all first spouses have been first ladies.

From 1777 until late 1790, Pennsylvania was governed by a "Supreme Executive Council" whose head had the title of President. These presidents' wives are included here as well.

== List of first ladies of Pennsylvania ==
Image	Name	Took role	Left role	President of Pennsylvania
	Elizabeth Fishbourne	1777	1778	Thomas Wharton Jr.
	Elizabeth Smith	1778	1778	George Bryan (acting)
	Esther de Berdt	1778	1781	Joseph Reed
	Sarah Lloyd	1781	1782	William Moore
	Mary Norris Dickinson	1782	1785	John Dickinson
	none (Franklin not married)	1785	1788	Benjamin Franklin

Image	Name	Took role	Left role	Governor of Pennsylvania
	Sarah Morris	1788	1799	Thomas Mifflin
	Sarah Armitage	1799	1808	Thomas McKean
	Catherine Antes	1808	1810	Simon Snyder
	none (Snyder was a widower)	1810	1814	Simon Snyder
	Mary Slough Scott	1814	1817	Simon Snyder
	Nancy Irwin	1817	1820	William Findlay
	Elizabeth Whitman	1820	1823	Joseph Hiester
	Susan Kimmell	1823	1829	John Andrew Schulze
	Mary Erb	1829	1833	George Wolf
	none (Mary Erb Wolf died in 1833)	1833	1835	George Wolf
	Susan Alter	1835	1839	Joseph Ritner
	Josephine McDermott	1839	1845	David R. Porter
	Jane Findlay	1845	1848	Francis R. Shunk
	none	1848	1848	none (office vacant)
	Mary Montieth	1848	1852	William F. Johnston
	Maria Jane Reed	1852	1855	William Bigler
	Sarah Ann Hepburn	1855	1858	James Pollock
	Mary W. Vanderbilt	1858	1861	William F. Packer
	Catherine Irvine Wilson	1861	1867	Andrew Gregg Curtin
	Mary Church Henderson	1867	1873	John W. Geary
	Sallie Douglas Sebring	1873	1879	John F. Hartranft
	Mary Elizabeth Loveland	1879	1883	Henry M. Hoyt
	unknown	1883	1887	Robert E. Pattison
	Mary Allison McAllister	1887	1891	James A. Beaver
	unknown	1891	1895	Robert E. Pattison
	Jane Armstrong Rankin	1895	1899	Daniel H. Hastings
	Elizabeth B. White	1899	1903	William A. Stone
	Virginia Earle Broomall	1903	1907	Samuel W. Pennypacker
	unknown	1907	1911	Edwin Sydney Stuart
	Harriet Day	1911	1915	John K. Tener
	none (Brumbaugh was a widower)	1915	1916	Martin Grove Brumbaugh
	Flora Belle Parks	1916	1919	Martin Grove Brumbaugh
	Emeline Roach	1919	1923	William Cameron Sproul
	Cornelia Elizabeth Bryce	1923	1927	Gifford Pinchot
	none (Fisher was a widower)	1927	1931	John Stuchell Fisher
	Cornelia Elizabeth Bryce	1931	1935	Gifford Pinchot
	Huberta F. Potter	1935	1939	George Howard Earle III
	Grace Hainey Morris (hostess)	1939	1939	Arthur James
	Dorothy James (hostess)	1939	1941	Arthur James
	Emily Radcliffe Case	1941	1943	Arthur James
	Mary Charity Scott	1943	1947	Edward Martin
	Sarah Andrews Baker	1947	1947	John C. Bell Jr.
	Jean Kerr Taylor	1947	1951	James H. Duff
	Helene Pennebecker Morgan	1951	1955	John S. Fine
	Mary Jane Strickler	1955	1959	George M. Leader
	Alyce Golden Lawrence	1959	1963	David L. Lawrence
	Mary Lowe Chamberlin	1963	1967	William Scranton
	Jane Harris Davies	1967	1971	Raymond P. Shafer
	Muriel Matzkin Shapp	1971	1979	Milton Shapp
	Ginny Judson Thornburgh	1979	1987	Dick Thornburgh
	Ellen Harding Casey	1987	1995	Robert P. Casey
	Michele Ridge	1995	2001	Tom Ridge
	Katherine Schweiker	2001	2003	Mark S. Schweiker
	Marjorie "Midge" Rendell	2003	2011	Ed Rendell
	Susan Corbett	2011	2015	Tom Corbett
	Frances Wolf	2015	2023	Tom Wolf
	Lori Shapiro	2023	serving	Josh Shapiro
