= Alderwood School =

School in Britain

Location
- Belle Vue Road; Aldershot, Hampshire, GU12 4RZ; England; 51.2368°N 0.7404°W

Information
- Type: Community school
- Established: 1964
- Local authority: Hampshire
- Department for Education URN: 116234 Tables
- Ofsted: Reports
- Head teacher: Andy Titheridge
- Gender: Coeducational
- Age: 5 to 16
- Website: www.alderwood.hants.sch.uk

Alderwood School is a coeducational all-through school located over three sites in Aldershot in Hampshire, England. It was formed in September 2017 from the merger of Belle Vue Infant School, Newport Junior School and The Connaught School.

== History ==
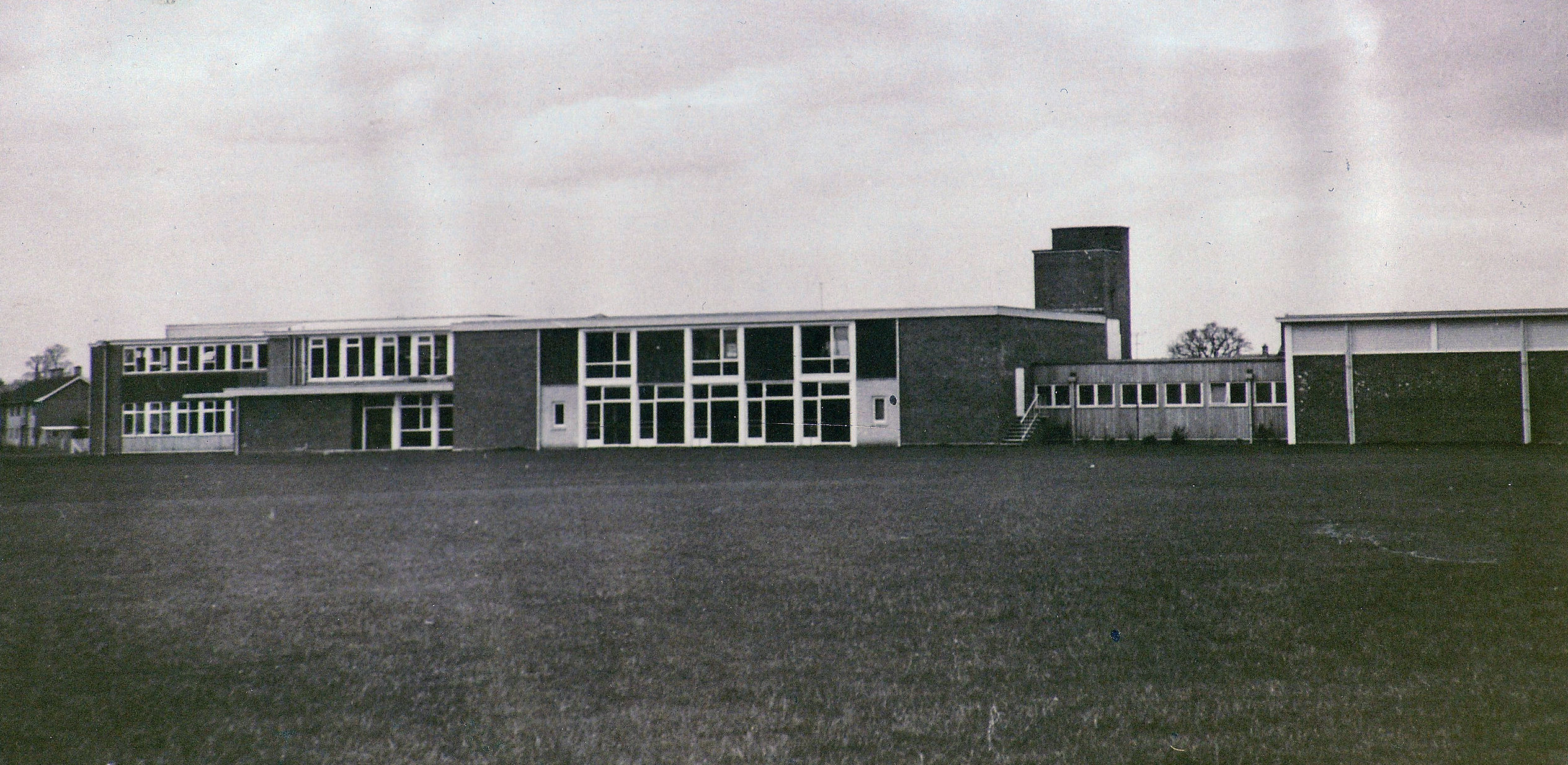
Heron Wood County Secondary School for Boys c1970

The secondary department of the school started life as Heron Wood County Secondary School for Boys in 1963. In 1987, with the closure of the nearby Manor Park Girls' School, it became coeducational and was renamed The Connaught School.

In 2011 The Connaught School, in partnership with Aldershot Town FC won the National LiteracyActionNet Award for Double Club, an after-school provision for pupils and parents that teaches skills in both Literacy and Sport.

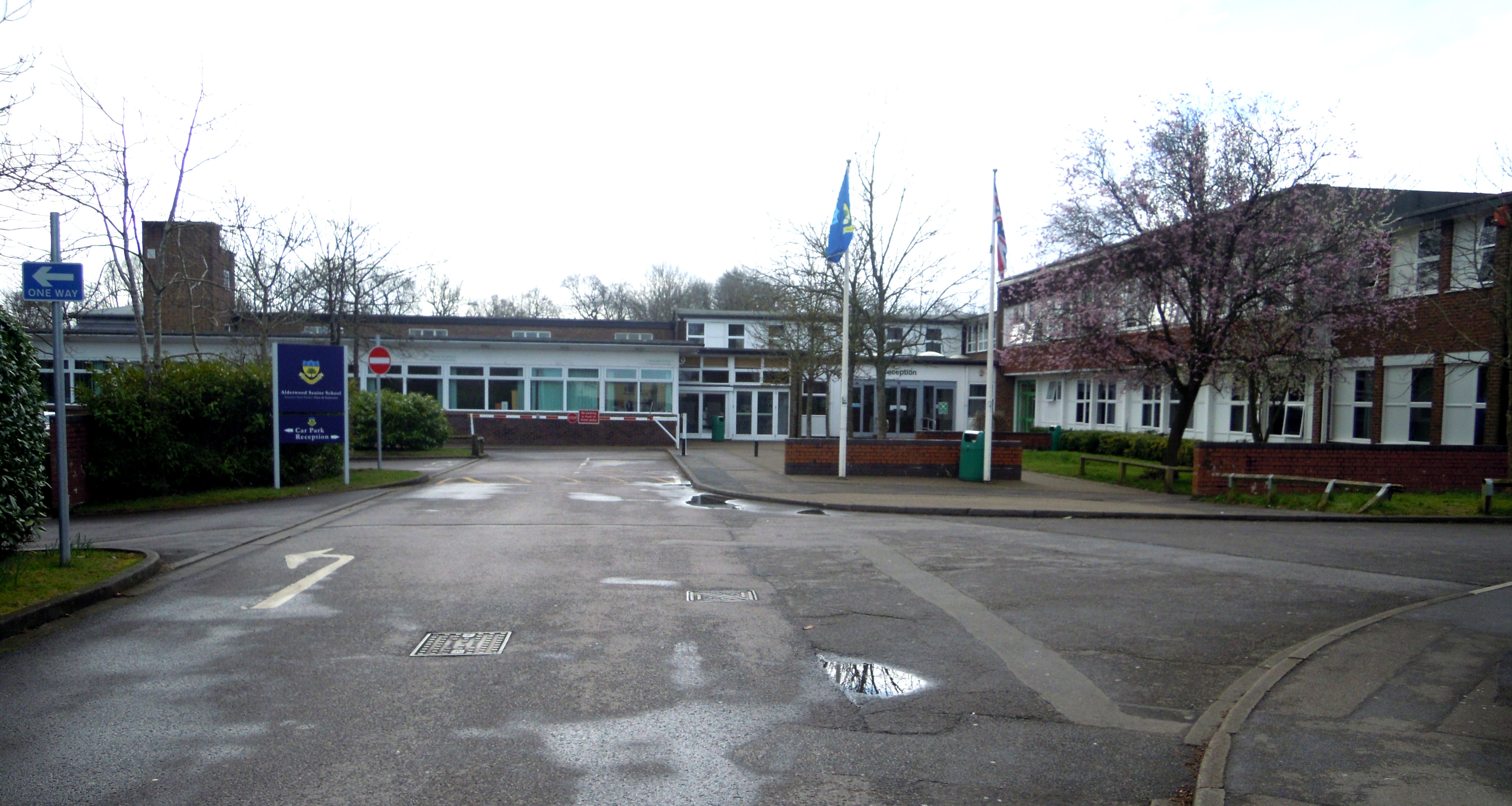
Alderwood Senior School in 2018

In June 2013 an Ofsted inspection was made of English and Literacy across The Connaught School, the outcome of which was ‘Good’ with outstanding features. Ofsted remarked on the “excellent provision” for pupils and also on “commitment across the curriculum” to raising standards. It was also noted in the report that “pupils across the school are making good progress.” A further Ofsted inspection of the school in 2015 rated it as "Requires Improvement". Recent years have seen a large increase in the numbers of students with English as an additional language (EAL) with 30% of students being EAL in 2019 compared to a national average of 16.9%.

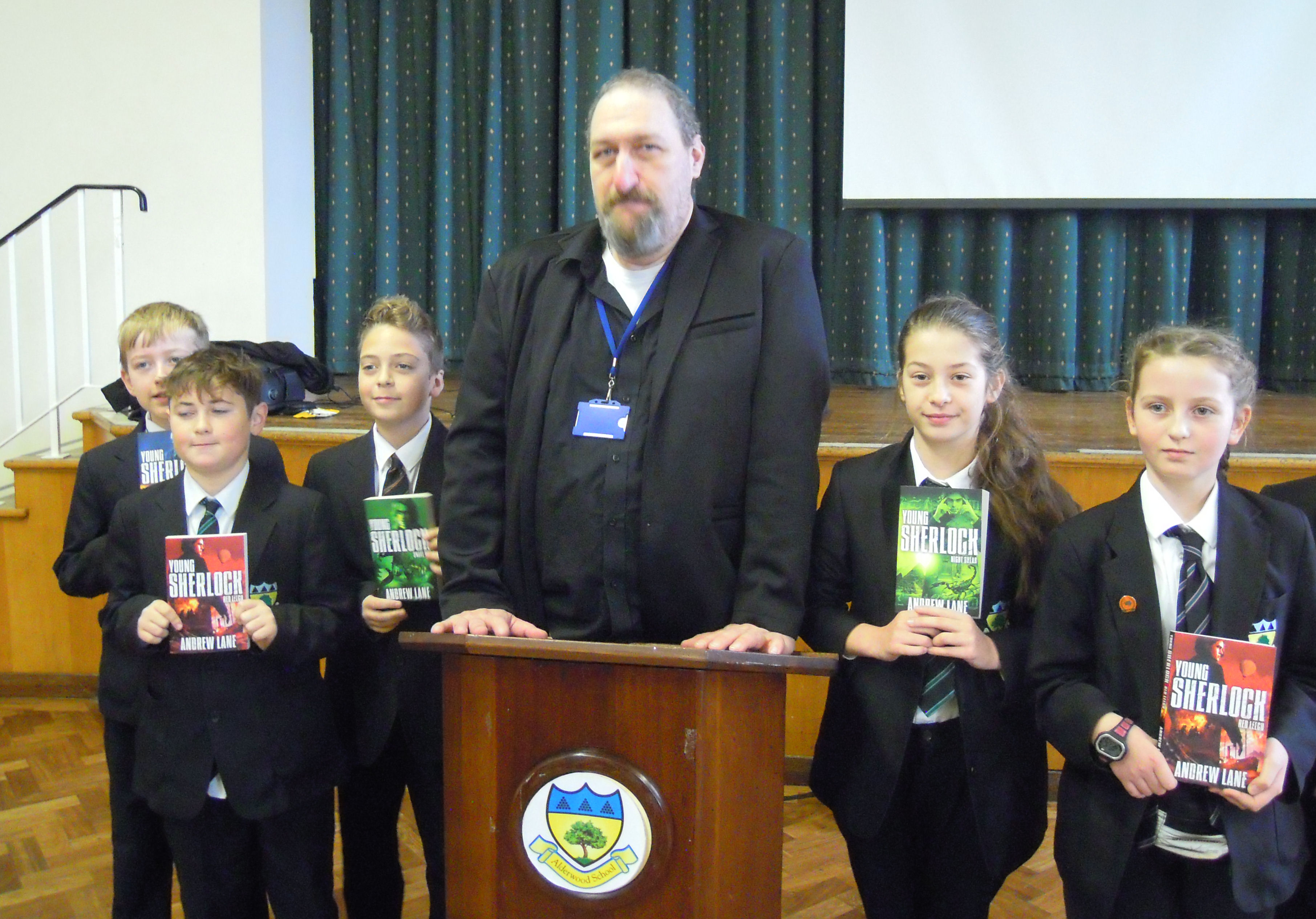
Young Sherlock Holmes author Andrew Lane meeting students of Alderwood School in December 2018

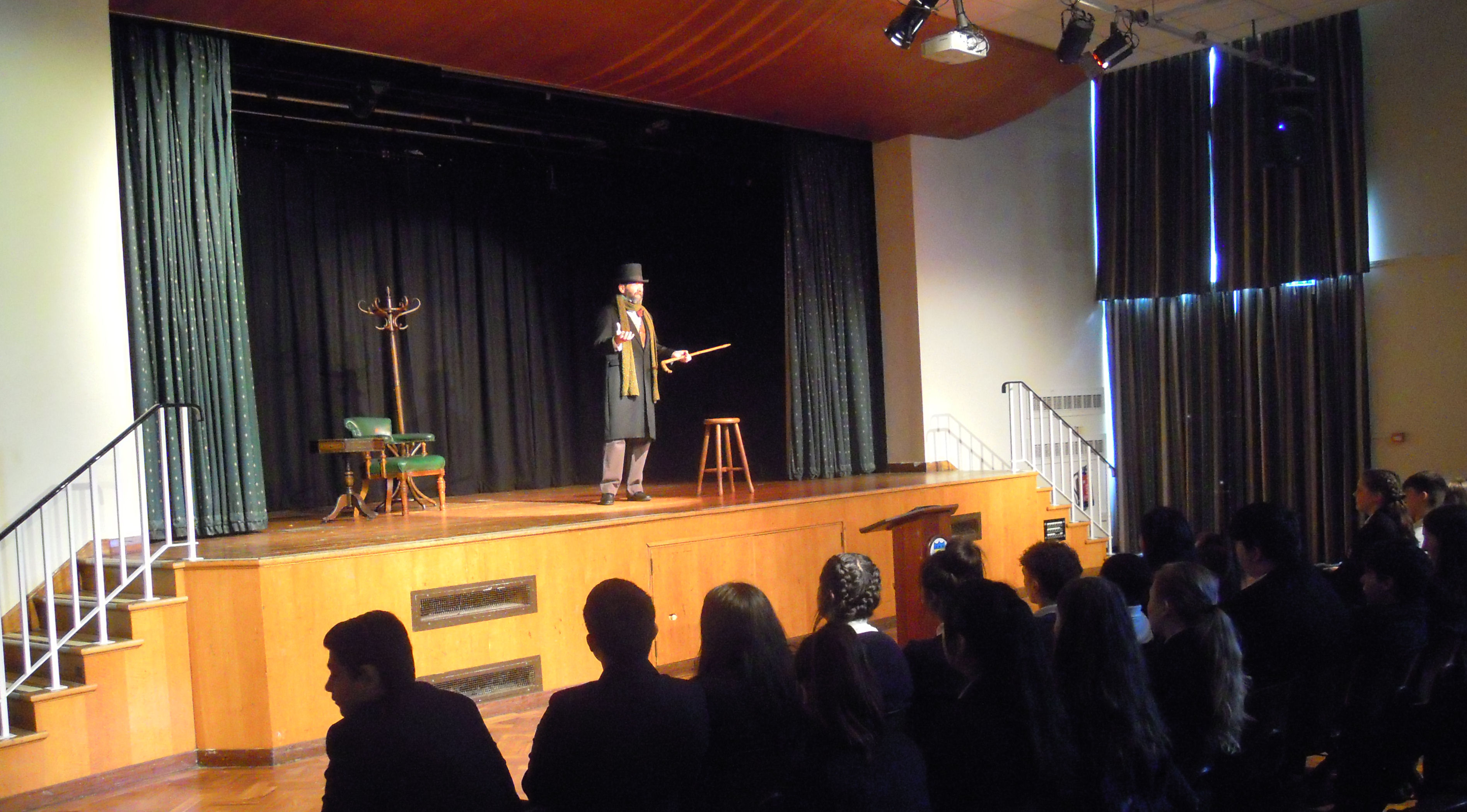
Actor Gerald Dickens performing A Christmas Carol at the school (2019)

In 2017, as a result of these Ofsted reports and considering that The Connaught School had "performed relatively weakly on attainment measures for the previous three years" (in 2015 29% of students attained 5 good GCSEs including English and mathematics compared to a national average of 57% placing the school well below the minimum Government Floor Standard of 40%) Hampshire County Council decided to merge The Connaught School with the Federation of Newport Junior School and Belle Vue Infant School from September 2017, to create a single all-through (age 4 to 16) school to collectively be called Alderwood School. A further Ofsted inspection across all three sites in January 2020 rated the school as "Good".

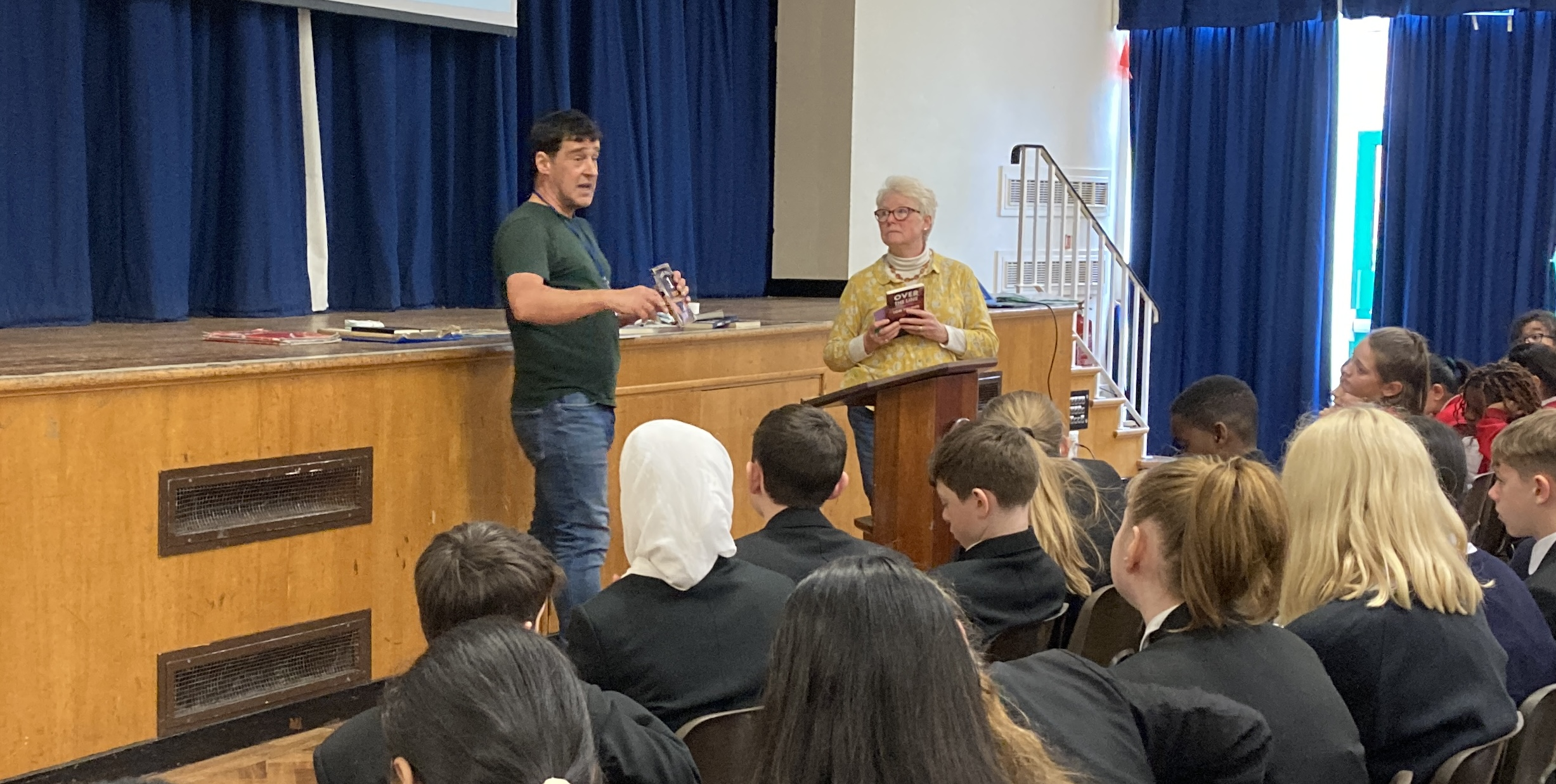
Children's author Tom Palmer speaking to students in May 2023

In 2018 Young Sherlock Holmes author Andrew Lane gave a talk to students at the school while in 2019 the actor Gerald Charles Dickens, the great-great-grandson of Charles Dickens, performed his one-man show of A Christmas Carol in the school hall. Dickens returned to the school to give repeat performances in October 2021 and October 2023. The author Tom Palmer visited the school in May 2023.

== Today ==
Recent visits in support of learning include: the Natural History Museum; the Imperial War Museum; the Old Operating Theatre Museum and St Thomas' Hospital; Portsmouth Dockyard, the Mary Rose and HMS Victory while theatre trips include Romeo and Juliet at Shakespeare's Globe, The Tempest and An Inspector Calls at the Mayflower Theatre in Southampton. In addition, the Physical Education department organises an annual sporting tour of Europe during which students play matches against local teams while at the same time experiencing local culture and customs.

Students at the secondary school are involved in an annual performance in the school hall. These include the musicals School of Rock (2018), The Addams Family (2019), Grease (2020) Hairspray (2022) and Sister Act (2023).

Alderwood School is a partner school of the Sixth Form College in nearby Farnborough. Since 2018 the school has been home to Aldershot Town F.C. Academy which has the use of classrooms in the school in addition to the 24-hour astroturf and gymnasium.

== Notable pupils ==
=== As Heron Wood ===
- Russell Foster CBE, FRS, FMedSci, professor of circadian neuroscience, the Director of the Nuffield Laboratory of Ophthalmology and Nicholas Kurti Senior Fellow at Brasenose College at the University of Oxford.
- Ronald Cavaye, classical pianist and writer.
- Floyd Manderson, an athlete who competed in the men's high jump at the 1988 Summer Olympics.
- Stephen McKay, Distinguished Professor in Social Research at the University of Lincoln.
- Seamus Perry, Fellow of Balliol College, Oxford and since 2014 a professor in the English Faculty at the University of Oxford.

=== As Connaught School ===
- Amelle Berrabah of the girl group the Sugababes.
- Alex Reid, mixed martial artist and former husband of English model Katie Price.
