= Seamus Perry =

Professor in the English Faculty at the University of Oxford

Seamus Perry (born 2 March 1967) is an English author, academic, fellow and tutor of Balliol College, Oxford and, since 2014, a professor of English Literature in the English Faculty at the University of Oxford. In May 2025, he was elected to become Master of Balliol College from July 2026.

== Life ==
Perry was born in Aldershot in Hampshire in 1967. He attended various local schools, including Heron Wood Boys' School, before studying at St Catherine's College, Oxford, where he took his undergraduate (1989) and graduate (1995) degrees. He was Oakeshott Junior Research Fellow at Lincoln College, Oxford, from 1995 to 1998 before moving to the University of Glasgow from 1998 to 2003 where he was lecturer and then reader in English Literature. On his return to the University of Oxford in 2003 he became a fellow of Balliol College, Oxford, and a lecturer in the English Faculty. In 2014 he was appointed professor of English Literature in the Faculty of English at Oxford.

Perry's research interests lie mainly in the field of English Romantic poetry and thought, in particular in the works of Coleridge and Wordsworth. His other academic interest is in post-Romantic English poetry, in particular in the writings of Tennyson, Eliot, Auden, Larkin and the writers influenced by them. He also has an interest in the modern history of literary criticism, having written articles on the literary scholars and critics A. C. Bradley, William Empson, F. W. Bateson and M. H. Abrams. He writes for the London Review of Books, The Times Literary Supplement and other publications. With the British literary critic and scholar Sir Christopher Ricks and Freya Johnston he is co-editor of the journal Essays in Criticism: A Quarterly Journal of Literary Criticism (OUP), the general editor of the series 21st-Century Oxford Authors (OUP) and the Oxford edition of the works of William Empson.

Perry is a trustee of the Wordsworth Trust and a member of the Advisory Council of the Institute of English Studies in the School for Advanced Studies at the University of London. He was elected a fellow of the English Association in 2005. He is a fellow librarian of Balliol College, where he is also fellow for Charity Matters.

== Publications ==
- Matthew Arnold: Selected Writings, Oxford University Press (2020) ISBN 9780199595563
- Coleridge's Notebooks: A Selection, Oxford University Press (2003) ISBN 9780198712022
- Coleridge and the Uses of Division, Oxford University Press (1999) ISBN 9780198183976
- William Empson: Some Versions of Pastoral, Oxford University Press (2020) ISBN 9780199659661
- with Robert Douglas-Fairhurst, Tennyson Among the Poets: Bicentenary Essays, Oxford University Press (2009) ISBN 9780199557134
- Chameleon Poet: R.S. Thomas and the Literary Tradition, Oxford University Press (2013) ISBN 9780199687336
- (Contributor), The Cambridge Companion to Wordsworth, Cambridge University Press (2003) ISBN 9780511999154
