= Lori Shapiro =

First Lady of Pennsylvania (born 1973)

First Lady of Pennsylvania
- Incumbent
- Assumed role January 17, 2023
- Governor: Josh Shapiro
- Preceded by: Frances Wolf

Personal details
- Born: Lori Ferrara; March 10, 1973 (age 53)
- Spouse: Josh Shapiro (m. 1997)
- Children: 4
- Education: Colgate University (BA)

Lori Shapiro (née Ferrara; born March 10, 1973) is an American former White House official who has been the first lady of Pennsylvania since 2023 as the wife of Governor Josh Shapiro. She previously worked in the Clinton administration as an analyst in the Office of Science and Technology Policy and the liaison to the President’s Information Technology Advisory Committee.

== Early life and education ==
Shapiro spent her early childhood in Yardley, Pennsylvania, and later lived in Newtown, Pennsylvania. Her father was an electrical engineer, her mother was an office manager and her stepfather was a veterinarian.

Shapiro attended Akiba Hebrew Academy, now known as Jack M. Barrack Hebrew Academy, then located in Merion Station, Pennsylvania, for high school. She played on the softball team. Her teacher, Sharon Levin, described her as a good student, who was "kind, caring for humankind, caring about the environment, and caring about social justice." Shapiro graduated from Colgate University with a Bachelors of Arts in anthropology.

== Career ==
=== Clinton administration ===
During the Clinton administration, Shapiro worked in the White House as an analyst in the Office of Science and Technology Policy. She worked on issues relating to bridging the digital divide and technology and poverty. She was later promoted to serve as the liaison to the President’s Information Technology Advisory Committee.

Shapiro had wanted to pursue a career in government, but opted to become a full-time mother to allow her husband, Josh, to pursue his political career.

=== First Lady of Pennsylvania ===
Shapiro did not take a major role in her husband's 2022 gubernatorial campaign. She stated that she opted to take a limited role because it is "important to us that our kids have stability at home, too." However, she did campaign with her husband, at times, during the final weeks of the campaign. Shapiro stated that one of her major roles during the campaign was "always [trying] to keep Josh motivated and be encouraging to him by reminding him how high the stakes are and why he is doing public service to begin with..."

In October 2022, Shapiro stated that she had not spent much time planning what her role of First Lady would look like. However, she described it as "an incredible honor and privilege...I would be proud to serve our commonwealth alongside Josh."

== Personal life ==
She began dating Josh Shapiro in high school. They both attended Akiba Hebrew Academy, now Jack M. Barrack Hebrew Academy, and met in ninth grade.

While Shapiro was working at the White House, she reconnected with Josh Shapiro, who was working on Capitol Hill. They eventually resumed their relationship. They got engaged in 1997 in Jerusalem and married in May of that year. After their daughter was born, they moved back to Pennsylvania in 2001.

Shapiro is an avid fan of the Philadelphia 76ers and is involved with Barrack Hebrew Academy's alumni association.
