= Frances Wolf =

American painter

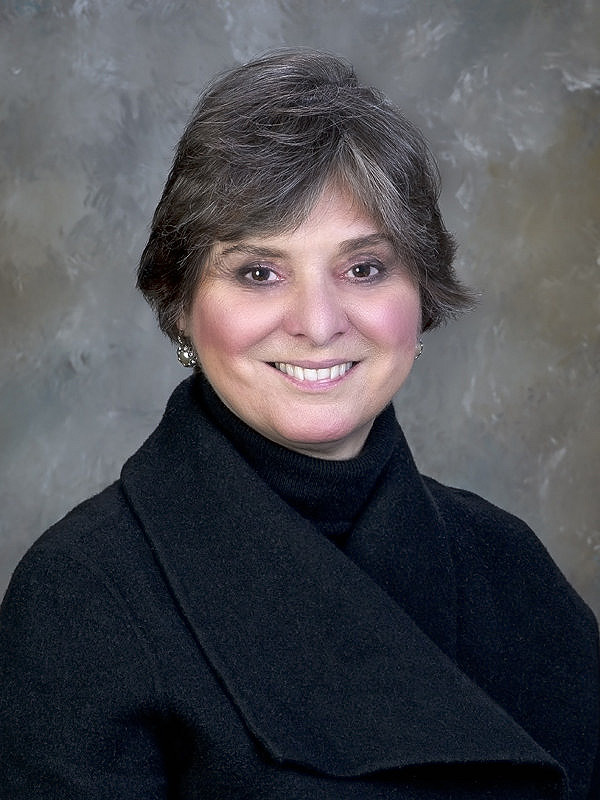

First Lady of Pennsylvania
- In role January 20, 2015 – January 17, 2023
- Governor: Tom Wolf
- Preceded by: Susan Corbett
- Succeeded by: Lori Shapiro

Personal details
- Born: Frances Donnelly c. 1952 Brooklyn, New York, U.S.
- Spouse: Tom Wolf (m. 1975)
- Children: 2
- Education: SOAS, University of London (BA); Franklin & Marshall College (BFA); Bryn Mawr College (MFA)

Frances Donnelly Wolf (born c. 1952) is an American artist, oil painter and advocate for the arts. She served as the 45th First Lady of Pennsylvania during the tenure of her husband, Governor Tom Wolf, from January 2015 until January 2023.

== Biography ==
Wolf was born Frances Donnelly in Brooklyn, New York. Her father was a career diplomat with the United States Foreign Service. She lived in the United States for the first eleven months of her life before moving overseas with her parents. She was raised in Iran, Germany, France, Pakistan and the United Kingdom and did not return to the United States on a full-time basis until her marriage in the 1970s.

She decided to pursue Asian Studies after living in Pakistan and earned her Bachelor of Arts from the School of Oriental and African Studies (SOAS) at the University of London.

Wolf later decided to pursue art and painting full time. Around the age of 40, she enrolled at Franklin & Marshall College in Lancaster, Pennsylvania, where she earned a second bachelor's degree in art history and studio art. She then completed her master's degree in art history at Bryn Mawr College in Bryn Mawr, Pennsylvania.
