= Andy Lane =

British author and journalist

Andrew Lane
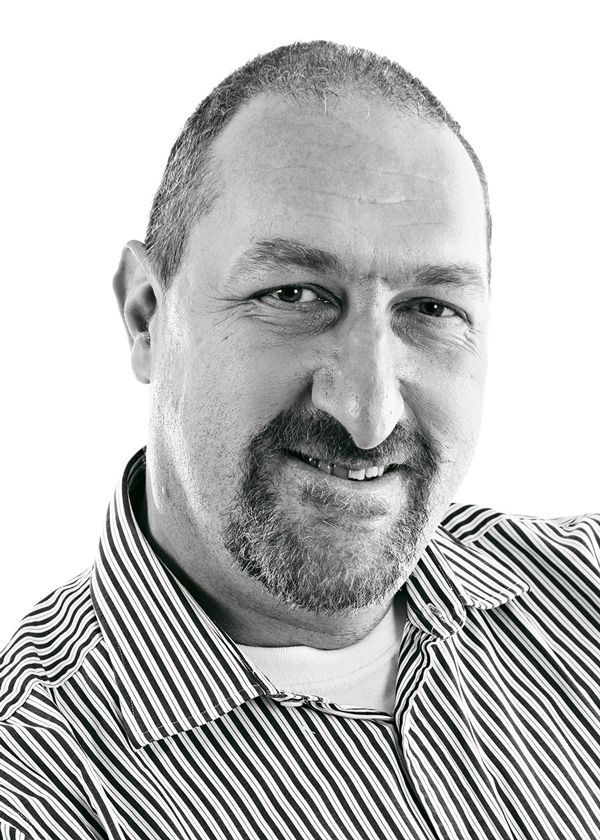
- Born: Andrew Lane; 17 April 1963 (age 63)
- Education: University of Warwick
- Occupations: Author, Journalist
- Children: 1
- Writing career
- Pen name: Andy Lane
- Genres: Science fiction, young adult fiction, detective fiction
- Notable work: Young Sherlock Holmes
- Website: Official website

Andrew Lane (born 17 April 1963), as Andy Lane, is a British author and journalist best known for the Young Sherlock Holmes series of Young Adult novels.

He has written novels in the Virgin New Adventures range and audio dramas for Big Finish based on the BBC science fiction television series Doctor Who.

His Young Adult books are generally published under the name Andrew Lane, while media spin offs are Andy Lane.

== Career ==
During 2009, Macmillan Books announced that Lane would be writing a series of books focusing on the early life of Sherlock Holmes. The series was developed in conjunction with the estate of Sir Arthur Conan Doyle. Lane had already shown an extensive knowledge of the Holmes character and continuity in his Virgin Books novel All-Consuming Fire in which he created The Library of St. John the Beheaded as a meeting place for the worlds of Sherlock Holmes and Doctor Who.

The first book in the 'Young Sherlock Holmes' series – Death Cloud – was published in the United Kingdom in June 2010 (February 2011 in the United States), with the second – Red Leech – published in the United Kingdom in November of that year (with a United States publication date under the title Rebel Fire of February 2012). The third book – Black Ice – was published in June 2011 in the UK while the fourth book – Fire Storm – was published originally in hardback in October 2011 with a paperback publication in March 2012. The fifth book, Snake Bite was published in hardback in October 2012 and the sixth book, Knife Edge was published in September 2013. Death Cloud was short-listed for both the 2010 North East Book Award. (coming second by three votes) and the 2011 Southampton's Favourite Book Award. Black Ice won the 2012 Centurion Book Award.

Early in 2012, Macmillan Children's Books announced that they would be publishing a new series by Lane, beginning in 2013. The Lost World books will follow disabled 15-year-old Calum Challenger, who is coordinating a search from his London bedroom to find creatures considered so rare that many do not believe they exist. Calum's intention is to use the creatures' DNA to help protect the species, but also to search for a cure for his own paralysis. His team comprises a computer hacker, a free runner, an ex-marine and a pathological liar.

== Personal life ==
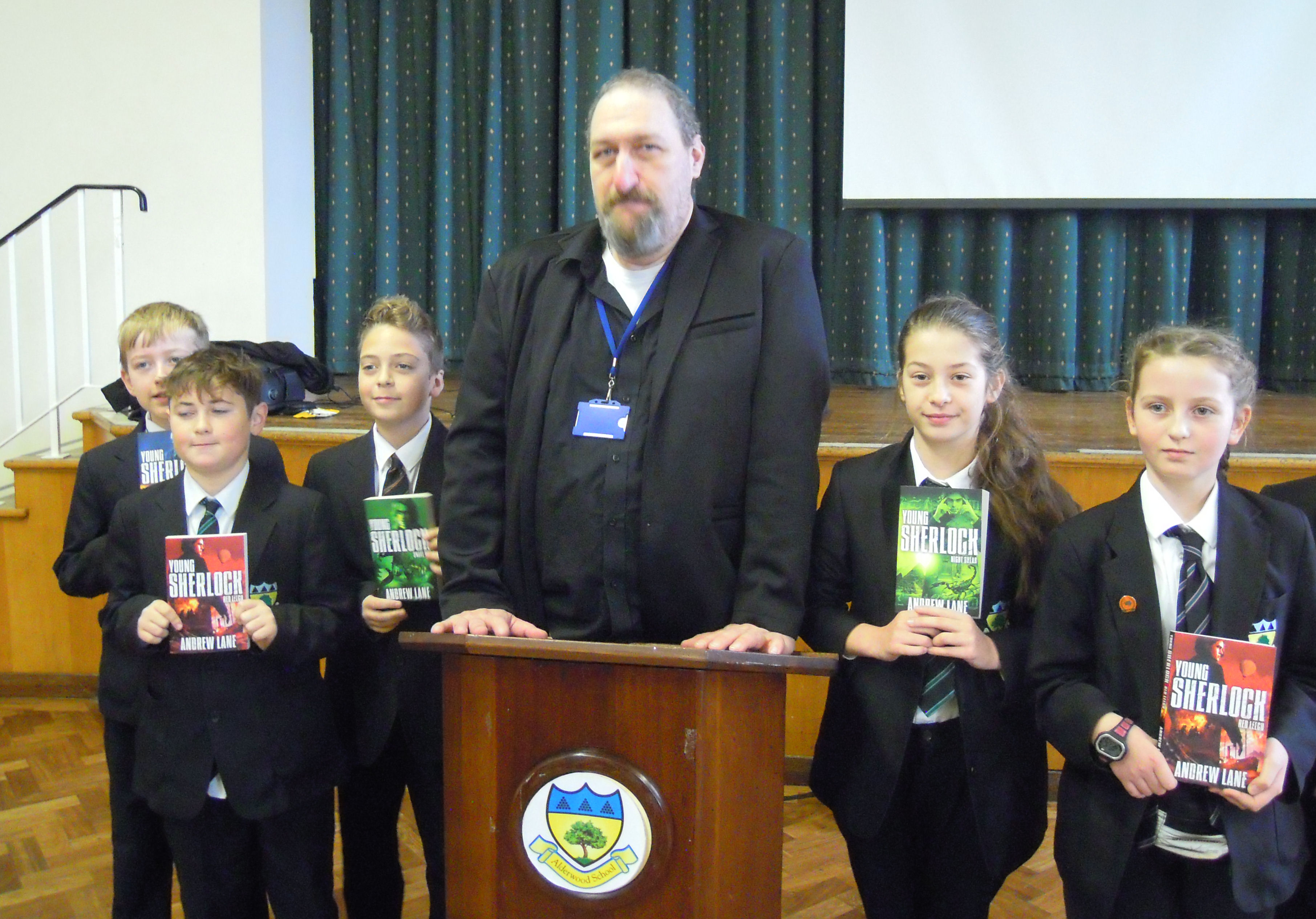
Lane meeting students of Alderwood School in Hampshire to discuss the Young Sherlock series in December 2018

Lane studied physics at the University of Warwick, where he was a contemporary and friend of writers Justin Richards and Craig Hinton.

He worked for the Ministry of Defence at Farnborough during which time he lived in Ash in Surrey for 11 years; since 2012 he has lived with his wife and son in Poole in Dorset, England. He is represented by Robert Kirby at United Agents.

== Bibliography ==
=== Novels ===
==== Agent Without Licence ====
- Agent Without Licence (July 2018) ISBN 978-1848126633
- Last Safe Moment (October 2018) ISBN 978-1848126657
- Last Boy Standing (January 2019) ISBN 978-1848126671
- Last Day on Earth (July 2019) ISBN 978-1848126695

==== The Six Directions Sequence ====
- Netherspace (May 2017) (with Nigel Foster) ISBN 978-1785651847
- Originators (November 2018) (with Nigel Foster) ISBN 978-1785651878
- Revelations (May 2021) written by Nigel Foster alone ISBN 978-1785651908

==== Crusoe ====
- Dawn of Spies (Mar 2016) ISBN 978-1945293252
- Day of Ice (Mar 2017) ISBN 978-1945293153
- Night of Terror (Mar 2018) ISBN 978-1945293597

==== Lost Worlds ====
- Lost Worlds (2013) ISBN 978-1447227991
- Shadow Creatures (2014) ISBN 978-1447228004

==== Young Sherlock Holmes ====
- Death Cloud (2010) ISBN 978-1447265580
- Red Leech (2010) ISBN 978-1447265597
- Black Ice (2011) ISBN 978-1447265603
- Fire Storm (2011) ISBN 978-1447265610
- Snake Bite (2012) ISBN 978-1447265627
- Knife Edge (2013) ISBN 978-1447200321
- Stone Cold (2014) ISBN 978-1447228011
- Night Break (2015) ISBN 978-1447294573

==== Virgin Books Doctor Who New Adventures ====
- Lucifer Rising (1993) (with Jim Mortimore) ISBN 978-0426203889
- All-Consuming Fire (1994) ISBN 978-0426204152
- Original Sin (1995) ISBN 978-0426204442

==== Virgin Books Doctor Who Missing Adventures ====
- The Empire of Glass (1995) ISBN 978-0426204572

==== BBC Books Eighth Doctor Who Adventures ====
- The Banquo Legacy (2000) (with Justin Richards) ISBN 978-0563538080

==== Torchwood ====
- Slow Decay (2007) ISBN 978-0563486558

==== Other television-related novels and novelisations ====
- Bugs : A Sporting Chance (1996)
- Randall and Hopkirk: Ghost in the Machine (2000)

==== Film- and television-related non-fiction ====
- The Babylon File (1997) ISBN 978-0753502334
- The Bond Files: The Unofficial Guide to Ian Fleming's James Bond (1998) (with Paul Simpson)
- The Babylon File: Volume 2 (1999)
- Randall and Hopkirk (Deceased) – The Files (2001)
- The World of Austin Powers (2002)
- Creating Creature Comforts (2003)
- The World of Wallace and Gromit (2004)
- The World of The Magic Roundabout (2005) (with Paul Simpson)
- The Art of Wallace & Gromit: The Curse of the Were-Rabbit (2005) (with Paul Simpson)

=== Short stories ===
- 'Living in the Past' (in Doctor Who Magazine, Issue 162, July 1990)
- 'Crawling From the Wreckage' (in The Ultimate Witch, Dell 1993)
- 'The More Things Change' (in Doctor Who Yearbook, 1994)
- 'Lovers, and Other Strangers' (in Interzone, issue 87, September 1994)
- 'Fallen Angel' (in Decalog, Virgin 1994)
- 'It's Only a Game' (in Doctor Who Yearbook, 1995)
- 'Faceless in Ghazar' (in Blake's Seven Poster Magazine, Issue 2, Jan 1995)
- 'The Old, Old Story' (in The Ultimate Dragon, 1995)
- 'Saving Face' (in Full Spectrum 5, 1995)
- 'Where the Heart Is' (in Decalog 2, 1995)
- 'Four Angry Mutants' (with Rebecca Levene) (in The Ultimate X-Men, 1996)
- 'Dependence Day' (with Justin Richards) (in Decalog 4, 1997)
- 'No Experience Necessary' (in Odyssey issue 2, 1997)
- 'As Near to Flame as Lust to Smoke' (in Shakespearean Detectives, 1998)
- 'The Gaze of the Falcon' (in The Mammoth Book of Royal Whodunnits, 1998)
- 'Blood on the Tracks' (in Bernice Summerfield – Missing Adventures, 2007)
- 'Only Connect' (in Short Trips: Transmissions, 2008)
- 'The Beauty of Our Weapons' (in Torchwood Yearbook, 2008)
- 'Who by Fire?' (in Torchwood Magazine, Issue 14; 2009)
- 'Closing Time' (in Torchwood Magazine, Issues 16 & 17; 2009)
- 'The Audience of the Dead' (in The Strand Magazine, Issue 34, June–Sept 2011)
- 'Bedlam' (a Young Sherlock Holmes short story published exclusively for the Kindle ebook reader, Dec 2011)
- 'The Preservation of Death' (in The Strand Magazine, Issue unknown, 2013)
- 'The Curious Case of the Compromised Card Files' (in The Further Encounters of Sherlock Holmes, March 2014, expanded from a piece written for a Barclay's Bank internal document in 2011)
- 'Blood Relations' (in Sharkpunk!, Snowbooks, planned for May 2015)
- 'Shine A Light' (in The X-Files, Volume 2, IDW, planned for late 2015)
- 'Flickering Flame' (in Cwej: Down the Middle, October 2020)

== Television ==
=== Space Island One ===
- 'Awakenings' (story) (1998)
- 'Mayfly' (script) (1998)
- 'Money Makes the World Go Around' (story) (1998)

== Audio ==
=== Doctor Who ===
- The Companion Chronicles: ‘Here There Be Monsters' (June 2008)
- The Companion Chronicles: ‘The Mahogany Murderers' (June 2009)
- A Thousand Tiny Wings (April 2010)
- Paradise 5 (with P.J. Hammond) (April 2010)
- Jago & Litefoot 1.4: 'The Similarity Engine' (June 2010)
- Jago & Litefoot 2.4: 'The Ruthven Inheritance' (January 2011)
- Jago & Litefoot 3.4: 'Chronoclasm' (June 2011)
- Jago & Litefoot 8.2: 'The Backwards Men' (October 2014)
- The Havoc of Empires (early 2015)

=== Blake's Seven ===
- Corners of the Mind (planned for some time in 2015)

== Journalism ==
Lane has written articles, reviews and interviews for various magazines, including: DreamWatch, Radio Times, SFX, Starburst, Star Trek Magazine, Star Wars Magazine, Star Wars Fact Files and TV Guide (United States).
