= Stephen McKay =

British academic and Professor of Social Research

Stephen Douglas McKay (born 3 May 1968) is a British academic and between 2013 and 2024 the first Distinguished Professor of Social Research at the University of Lincoln. McKay is one of Britain's foremost social policy researchers, his work having helped to redefine how poverty is measured.

== Early life ==
McKay was born at the Aldershot General Hospital in Aldershot in Hampshire in 1968, the son of Angela née Lindsay, a sales assistant, and Paul McKay, a roof tiler. His siblings are Glenn McKay (born 1966) and Rachael McKay (born 1972). Stephen McKay attended Heron Wood Boys' School in Aldershot before attending Pembroke College at the University of Oxford (1986–1989) where he gained a First Class Bachelor of Arts degree in philosophy, Politics and Economics.

== Academic career ==
On leaving Oxford McKay held various posts at the universities of Bath and Loughborough, at the Institute for Fiscal Studies (IFS), the National Centre for Social Research (NatCen), and the Policy Studies Institute (PSI). He was senior research fellow and deputy director at the Personal Finance Research Centre at the University of Bristol (2002–2007) and, after gaining his Doctor of Philosophy degree at the University of Bristol (2007) he was appointed professor of social research at the University of Birmingham (2007–2013), where he was also director of the ESRC Doctoral Training Centre from 2010 and a leading member of Birmingham's Third Sector Research Centre. From 2013 to 2024 he was the first distinguished professor of social research in the School of Social and Political Sciences at the University of Lincoln, where his subject specialisms include social research; inequality; family policy; quantitative methods; social security and pensions.

With Karen Rowlingson he co-authored Social Security in Britain (Palgrave Macmillan, 1999). He is the author and co-author of various academic articles and papers, including 'Child Maintenance: How Much Should the State Require Fathers to Pay When Families Separate?' (Family Law, 2013); 'Child Support Judgments: Comparing Public Policy to the Public's Policy' (University of Cambridge Faculty of Law Research Paper No. 34/2014); 'Levels of Financial Capability in the UK' (Public Money & Management, Vol. 27, No. 1, pp. 29–36, February 2007); 'When 4 ≈ 10,000: The Power of Social Science Knowledge in Predictive Performance' (2019); 'Has lockdown strengthened marriages?' (2020); and 'Parents in lockdown' (2020).

McKay was awarded the Progress Prize by Princeton University in 2017 for his work in predicting layoffs in the Fragile Families Challenge. He is an external examiner for the Bachelor of Science degree in social policy at the London School of Economics and is a Fellow of the Economic and Social Research Council (ESRC) Peer Review College and a Fellow of the Academy of Social Sciences.
