= Sarah Lloyd =

British travel writer (born 1947)

Sarah Lloyd (born 1947) is a British travel writer, best known for her nonfiction books An Indian Attachment (1984) and Chinese Characters (1987).

Born into an upper-middle-class family in Stanmore, westLondon, she trained as a landscape architect, won an architecture scholarship to Brazil and studied under the renowned Roberto Burle Marx. She then travelled to India, where she had a love affair with a Sikh; this story became the subject of her first book, An Indian Attachment (1984, new edition by Eland in 2008). The book's insight into Indian village life earned it widespread praise, including among Indians. Writing in India Today, Ramesh Chandran said of it, "Part-travelogue, part-love story, part-autobiography, Attachment has some of the most evocative and vivid writing on Indian village life – especially in the Punjab – which is at times more lucid and informed than the recordings of social scientists on the structure of village society." The Tribune, another Indian newspaper, praised its "utter sincerity and authenticity", and the UK's Sunday Telegraph called it "above all, a brilliant exposé of village India."

Lloyd followed this success with Chinese Characters in 1987, which achieved similar success to her earlier book. Andrew Lane, who used it to research his Young Sherlock series, talks about in his Author's Note to Snake Bite, calling it a "brilliant... meditation on Chinese people, Chinese history, the Chinese character".

Since her second book, Lloyd has worked as a landscape architect and a landscape photographer.
