= Tom Wolf =

Governor of Pennsylvania from 2015 to 2023

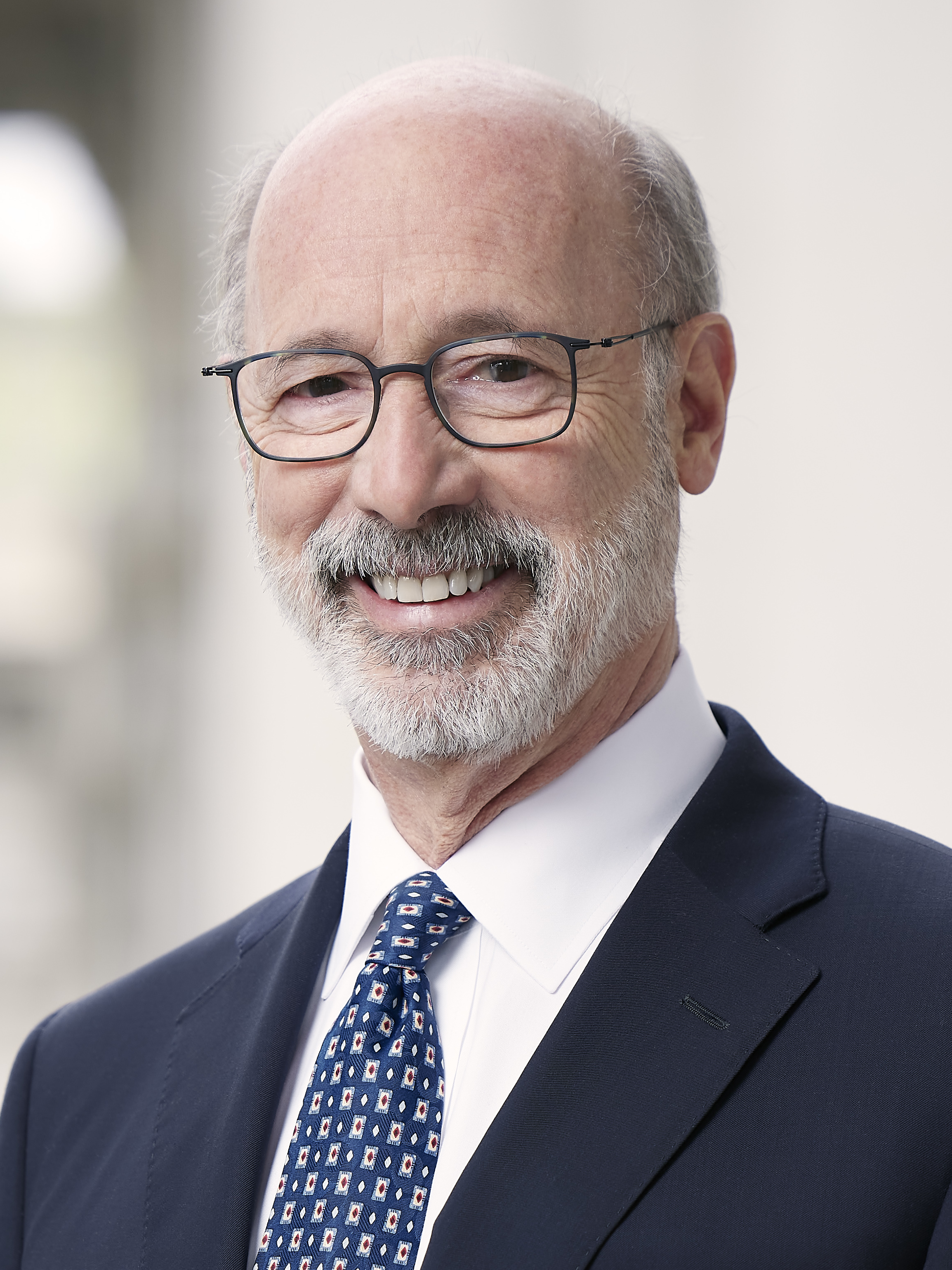
- Official portrait, 2022

47th Governor of Pennsylvania
- In office January 20, 2015 – January 17, 2023
- Lieutenant: Mike Stack; John Fetterman; Jake Corman (acting); Kim Ward (acting)
- Preceded by: Tom Corbett
- Succeeded by: Josh Shapiro

Secretary of Revenue of Pennsylvania
- In office April 25, 2007 – November 30, 2008
- Governor: Ed Rendell
- Preceded by: Gregory Fajt
- Succeeded by: Stephen Stetler

Personal details
- Born: Thomas Westerman Wolf; November 17, 1948 (age 77) Mount Wolf, Pennsylvania, U.S.
- Party: Democratic
- Spouse: Frances Donnelly (m. 1975)
- Children: 2
- Education: Dartmouth College (BA); University of London (MPhil); Massachusetts Institute of Technology (PhD)

Thomas Westerman Wolf (born November 17, 1948) is an American politician and businessman who was the 47th governor of Pennsylvania from 2015 to 2023. He previously was chairman and CEO of his business, The Wolf Organization, and later as secretary of the Pennsylvania Department of Revenue from April 2007 to November 2008.

A member of the Democratic Party, Wolf won his party's nomination for governor of Pennsylvania in 2014 and defeated Republican incumbent Tom Corbett in the general election by a margin of almost 10 percentage points. He was reelected in 2018. Wolf was succeeded by fellow Democrat Josh Shapiro in 2023.

== Early life and education ==
Wolf was born and raised in Mount Wolf, Pennsylvania, the son of Cornelia Rohlman (née Westerman; 1923–2018) and William Trout Wolf (1921–2016), a business executive. He was raised Methodist. His hometown was named after his ancestor, who was the town's postmaster.

Wolf attended his local public school through 10th grade and graduated from The Hill School, in Pottstown, Pennsylvania, in 1967. He went on to receive a B.A. in government, magna cum laude, from Dartmouth College in 1972, an M.Phil. from the University of London in 1978, and a Ph.D. in political science from the Massachusetts Institute of Technology in 1981. While a student at Dartmouth, Wolf took a leave of absence and joined the Peace Corps, with which he spent over two years in India.

After earning his Ph.D., his dissertation on the United States House of Representatives was named the best of 1981 by the American Political Science Association. Wolf turned down an opportunity to interview for a tenure-track faculty position at Harvard University to begin his career at The Wolf Organization as manager of a True Value store owned by the company.

He met his wife, Frances, in London, when they were both students. They married in 1975 and have two adult daughters.

== Business and early political career ==
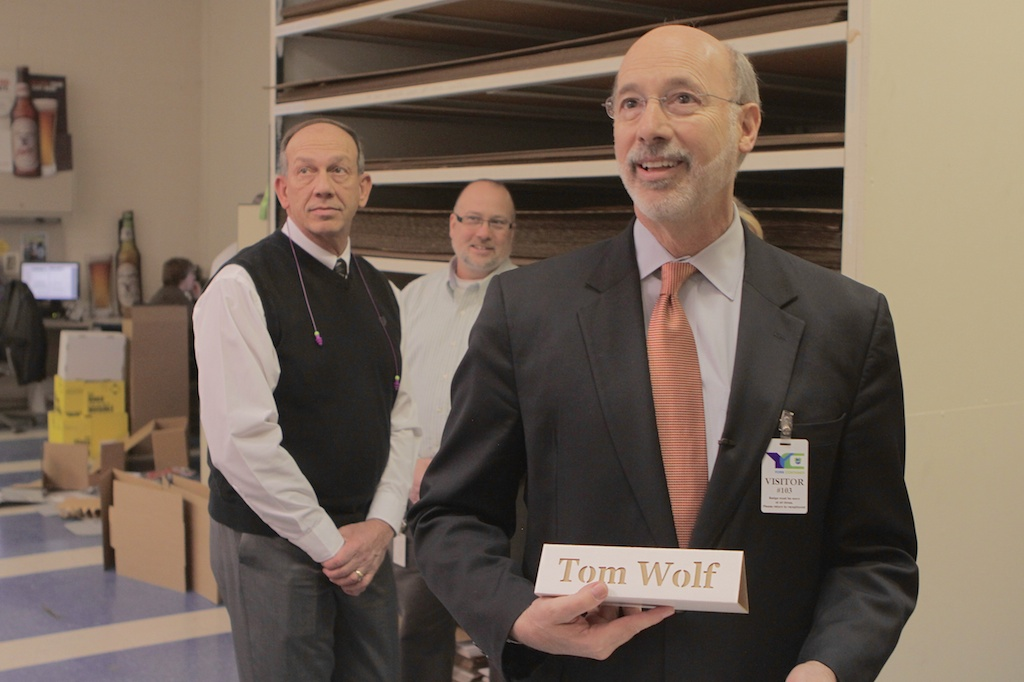
Wolf in January 2014

Wolf purchased The Wolf Organization in 1985 with two partners. During the administration of Governor Robert P. Casey, Wolf was on an economic development board and on the Pennsylvania Legislative Commission on Urban Schools.

After selling his company to a private equity firm in 2006, Wolf was nominated by then-governor Ed Rendell in January 2007 to be the secretary of revenue of Pennsylvania. He was in that position in Rendell's cabinet from his April 2007 confirmation by the Pennsylvania State Senate until he resigned in November 2008. He had planned to run for governor of Pennsylvania in the 2010 election, but ultimately did not in order to repurchase the Wolf Organization, which was facing bankruptcy. Wolf continued as an executive in The Wolf Organization until his election as governor. He was chairman and chief executive officer until stepping down from the latter position in December 2013 to focus on his gubernatorial campaign and from the board altogether in December 2014 after his election.

Wolf chaired the York County United Way, the York County Community Foundation, the York College board of trustees, and the York County Chamber of Commerce, WITF, the regional public television system, Better York, Historic York, the Housing Council of York, and the Administrative Board of Otterbein United Methodist Church. He has also was on the boards of the York Jewish Community Center, Memorial Hospital of York and Crispus Attucks of York.

== Gubernatorial campaigns ==
=== 2014 campaign ===
On April 2, 2013, Wolf announced his candidacy for governor of Pennsylvania in the 2014 election. He pledged $10 million of his own money toward the primary election, with an intent to raise at least $5 million from supporters. He was the third person to announce candidacy, after John Hanger of the Pennsylvania Department of Environmental Protection and Max Meyers, a minister from Cumberland County, but at least four others were expected to join the race.

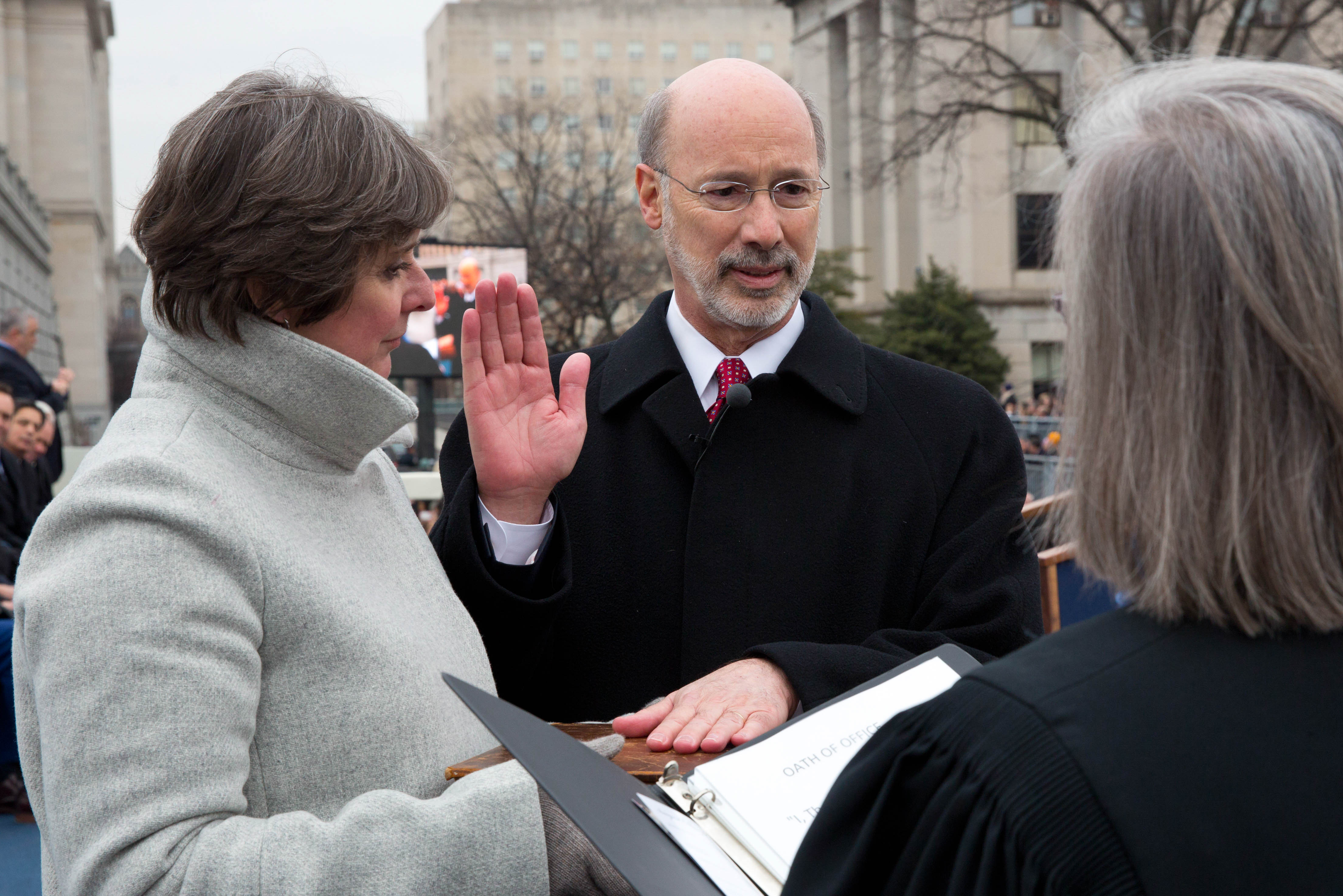
Wolf takes the oath of office as Governor on January 20, 2015.

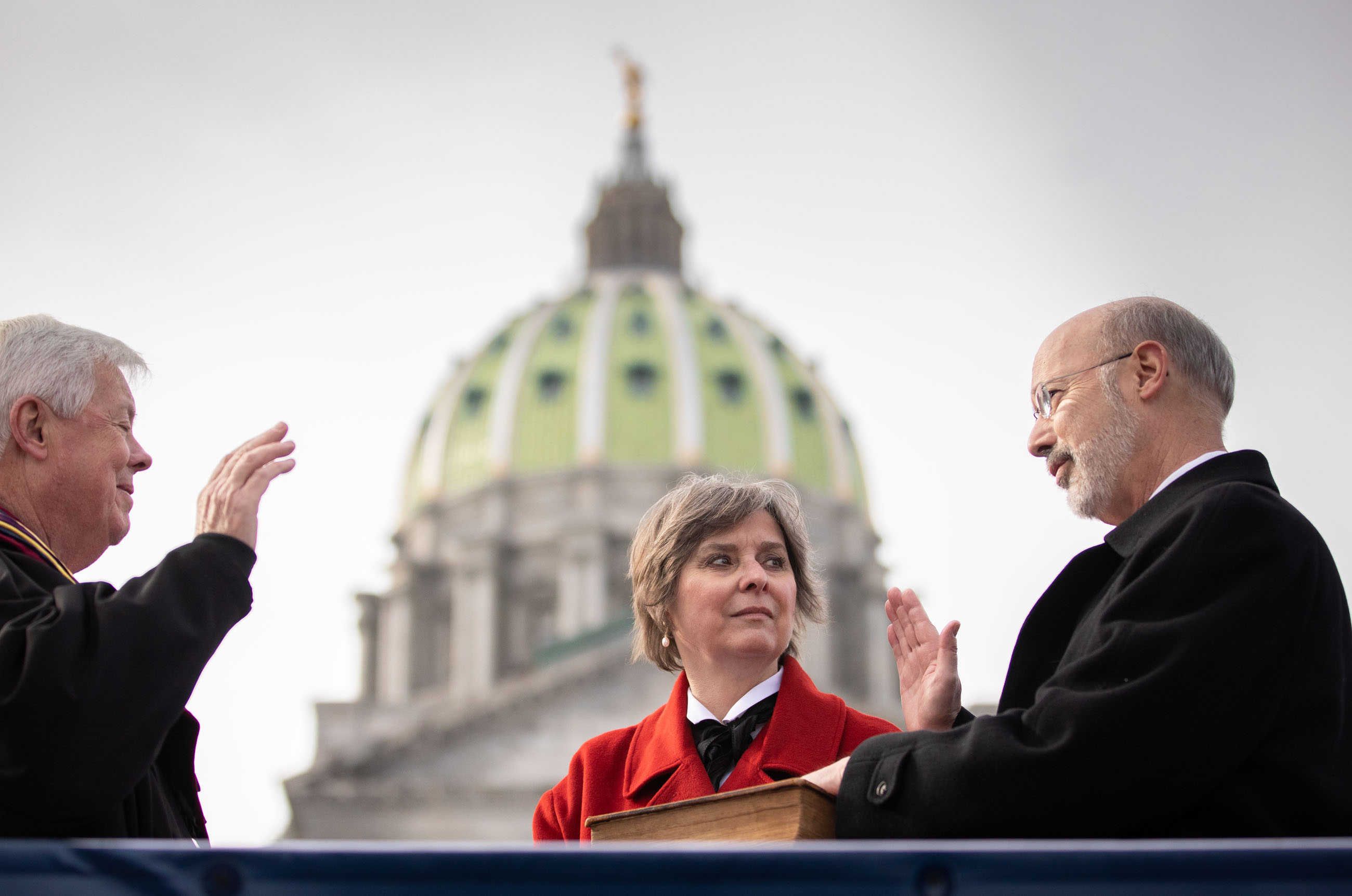
Wolf being sworn in for a second term in 2019.

By March 2014, several polls suggested Wolf was the front-runner in the race for the Democratic nomination after an extensive television campaign. A February 2014 Franklin & Marshall College poll showed him with a 27-point lead over his nearest competitor, Allyson Schwartz, and a Harper poll showed him leading Schwartz by 26 points, as did a late March 2014 Franklin & Marshall poll.

In late April and early May, Wolf faced attacks from fellow candidate Rob McCord over his association with controversial former York, Pennsylvania, mayor Charlie Robertson. Schwartz accused Wolf's campaign of plagiarizing his "Fresh Start" plan from an energy equipment company. Despite the attacks, a Muhlenberg College/Morning Call poll suggested Wolf continued to lead with 38% to Schwartz's 13% and McCord's 11%.

In the May 20 primary, Wolf defeated Schwartz, McCord, and Katie McGinty to win the Democratic nomination. He faced incumbent Republican Governor Tom Corbett in the November general election. Heading into the final two months of the campaign, a number of polls indicated a varying but consistent advantage for Wolf over Corbett. Although Corbett slightly narrowed the deficit as the election approached, Wolf maintained a lead in the race. On November 4, Wolf was elected governor with 54.9% of the vote. His victory was notable for engaging traditionally Republican areas of the state. Insiders have attributed this phenomenon to Regional Field Director Brendan Murray and his extensive relationship network in north-central Pennsylvania. Wolf is the first challenger to oust a sitting governor of Pennsylvania since the state's governors became eligible for immediate reelection in 1968.

=== 2018 campaign ===
Wolf ran for reelection in 2018 and was unopposed in the Democratic primary. He defeated Republican State Senator Scott Wagner in the November 8 general election with about 57% of the vote. He is the first Pennsylvania governor to win election twice while losing both times in his home county (since 1968, when a new state constitution permitted governors to run for consecutive terms).

== Governor of Pennsylvania (2015–2023) ==
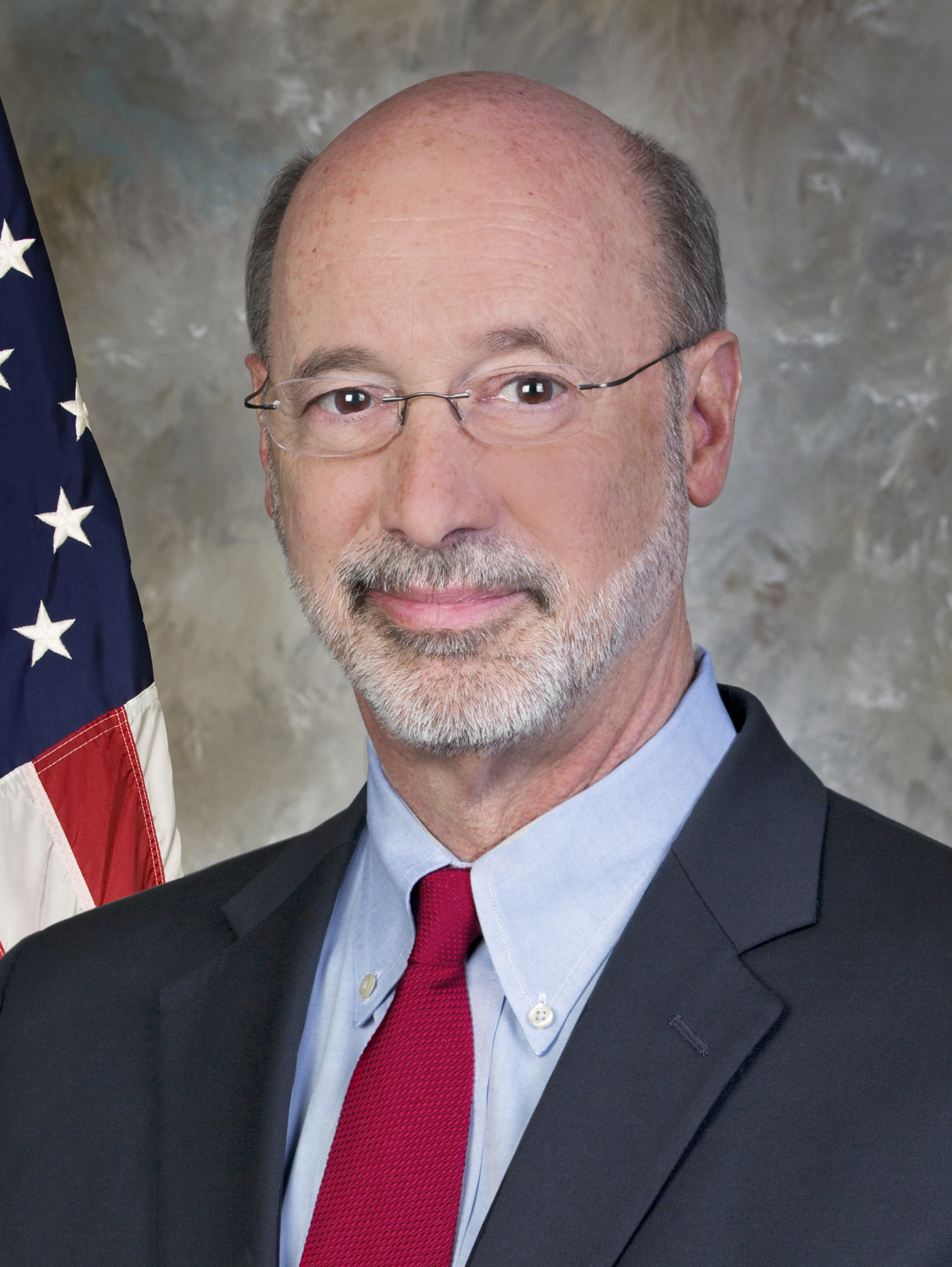
Wolf's first gubernatorial portrait

Wolf took office as Pennsylvania's 47th governor upon the expiration of Corbett's term on January 20, 2015, with the inaugural ceremony occurring in front of the Pennsylvania State Capitol in Harrisburg. Upon taking office, he opted not to move into the Pennsylvania Governor's Residence but instead commute from his home in York. A spokesman for Wolf said the residence would still be used for official events and other functions.

Shortly after being sworn in, Wolf signed two executive orders banning gifts to state employees and requiring a bidding process for outside legal contracts. Wolf also restored a ban on hydraulic fracturing, or "fracking", in state parks and placed a moratorium on the death penalty in Pennsylvania. The most significant executive action in his first days in office was his move to fully expand Medicaid under the Affordable Care Act.

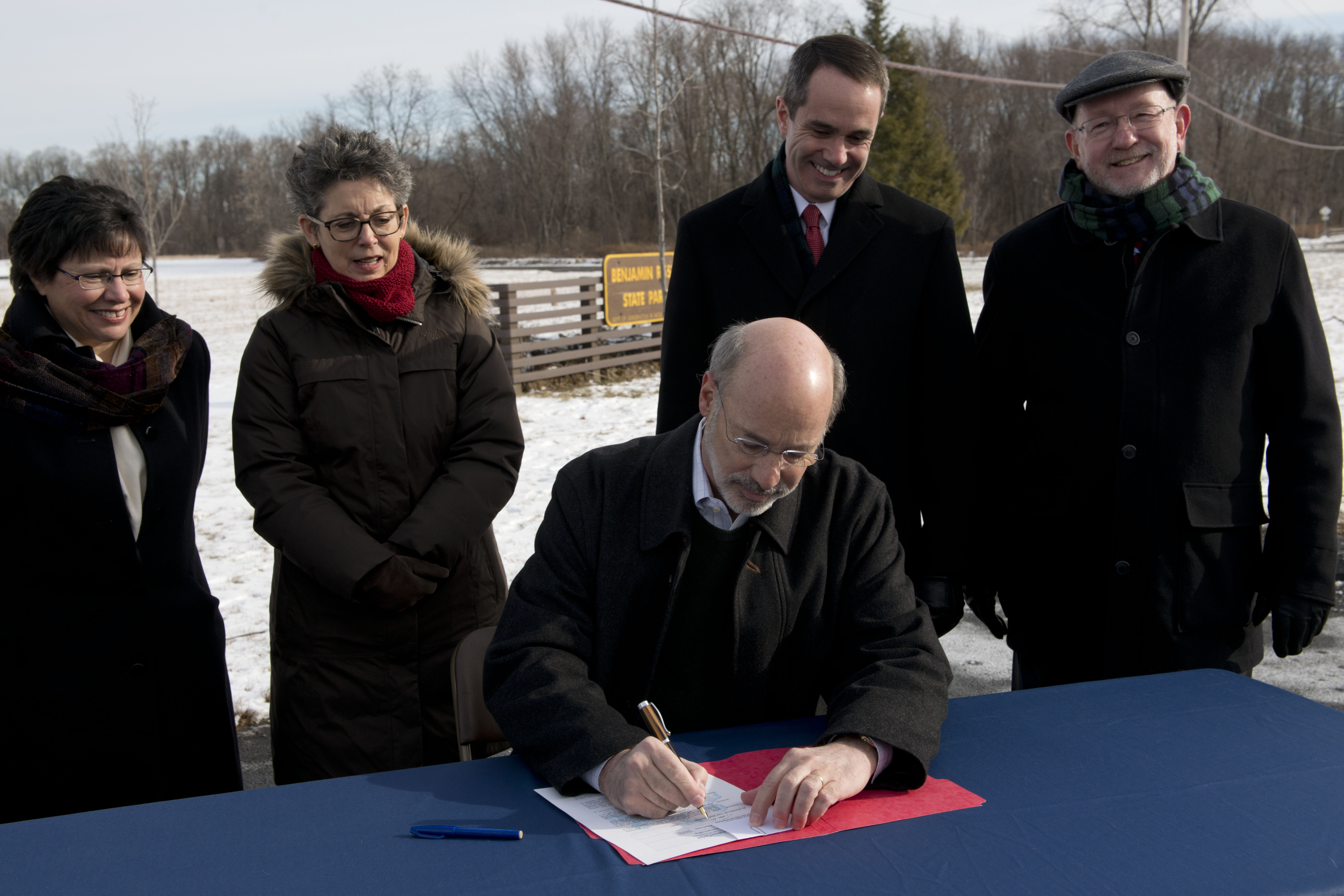
Governor Wolf as he signs an executive order to ban fracking in state parks on January 29, 2015, while others look on

=== Budget ===
Wolf proposed his first budget in March 2015, which included an increase in education spending, reductions in property taxes and the corporate tax, and a new severance tax on natural gas. Six months into his tenure, in July 2015, the websites OnTheIssues and InsideGov named Wolf the most liberal incumbent governor in the nation, based on a rating of public statements and press releases among other measures; Wolf rejected this assessment, arguing that his policies were directed by practicality rather than ideology.

On July 1, 2015, Wolf vetoed a budget the Pennsylvania General Assembly submitted to him, causing a budget dispute between the governor's office and the legislature. This marked the first time a Pennsylvania governor vetoed a budget bill in its entirety since Milton Shapp did so in 1976. Wolf argued the budget was not balanced, disputing Republicans' claim that it would provide increased funding in certain areas without raising taxes. A point of dispute in the budget process was the proposed privatization of Pennsylvania's wine and liquor sales, which Wolf opposed. The state operated without a full budget for 267 days—the longest period without a full budget in Pennsylvania history—until the 2015–2016 budget became law without Wolf's signature in March 2016.

=== "It's On Us PA" ===
In January 2016, at Elizabethtown College, Wolf announced the launch of the "It's On Us PA" campaign, which aims to expand awareness of sexual assault in schools and on college campuses. Pennsylvania was the first state to implement a statewide campaign that called for a collaboration of schools, law enforcement, victim services organizations, and other community members to promote awareness, education, and bystander intervention of sexual violence specifically on school campuses. Several schools, including Franklin and Marshall College and Butler County Community College, and Pennsylvania State System of Higher Education Chancellor Frank Brogan signed on to the initiative.

On November 30, 2016, Wolf announced the awarding of "It's On Us PA" grants of $1 million to 36 post-secondary schools in the state to combat sexual violence on their campuses. Programs considered for funding included but were not limited to those that enhanced awareness of available resources as well as the rights of students and, most importantly, to increase mechanisms for anonymous reporting.

=== Opioid epidemic ===
In November 2016, Wolf signed several laws addressing the opioid crisis in the state. In January 2018, Wolf declared Pennsylvania's heroin and opioid addiction crisis a statewide emergency. Pennsylvania became the eighth state to do so. Such a declaration lets Pennsylvania officials "override any current rules or regulations they perceive as hampering the state's ability to address the opioid epidemic". On November 3, 2022, Wolf signed 66 new laws sent to him by the legislature addressing a range of issues, including new initiatives designed to curb the opioid epidemic along with clean energy tax credits and cracking down on turnpike toll scofflaws.

=== Cannabis ===
Wolf signed into law bills that legalized medical marijuana in Pennsylvania, reformed pensions, and expanded the number of offenses former criminal defendants could get sealed, among other legislation. In September and October 2020, Wolf held a series of press conferences making the case for legalizing recreational cannabis in Pennsylvania, arguing that the reform was particularly needed in light of the economic downturn caused by COVID-19 and the prospect of losing revenue to New Jersey, which had recently legalized cannabis. Wolf first came out for legalization in 2019 after a statewide listening tour by Lieutenant Governor John Fetterman showed broad support for legalization.

=== COVID-19 pandemic ===
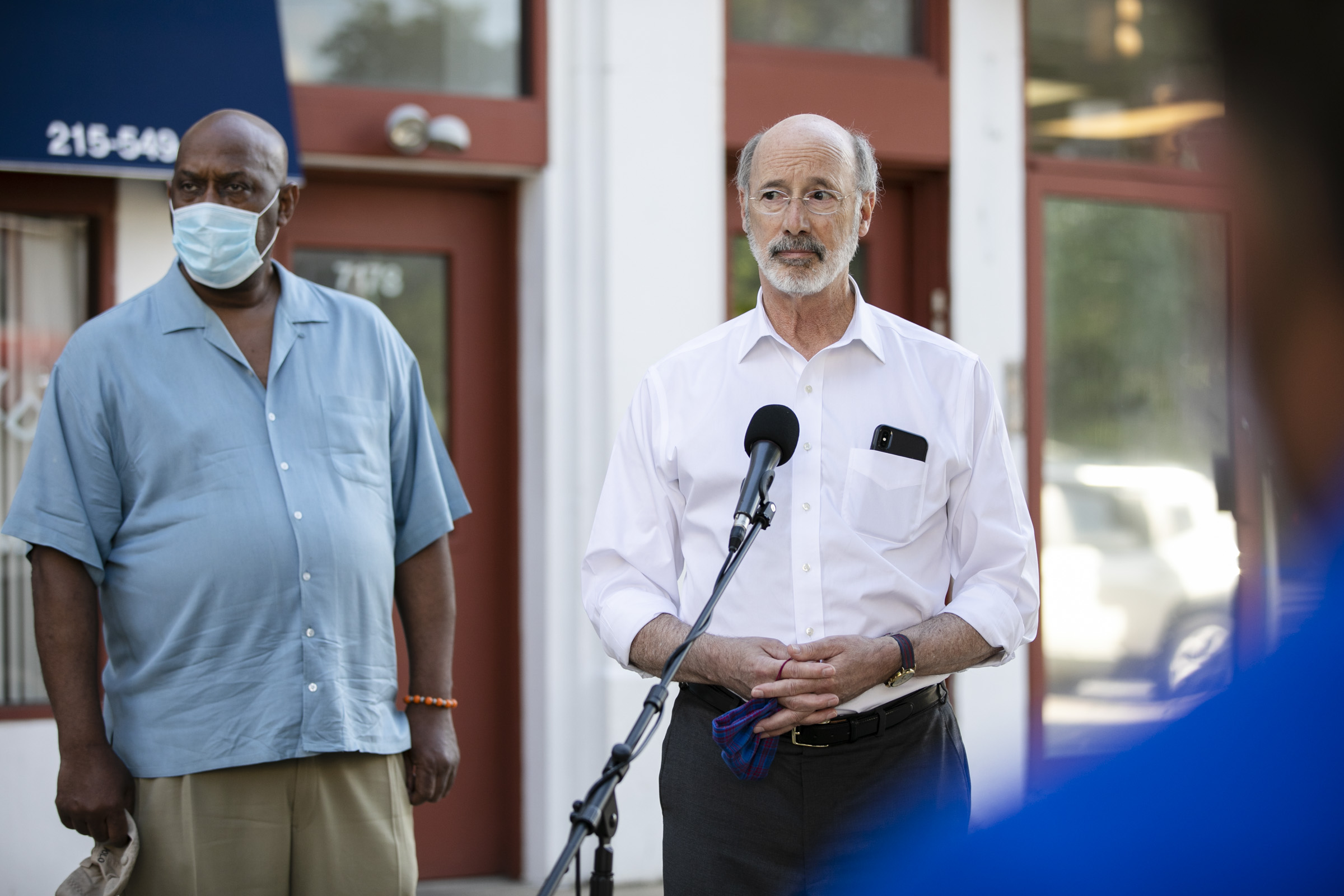
Governor Wolf giving a speech in Philadelphia in June 2020

On March 6, 2020, Wolf confirmed there were two known cases of COVID-19 in Delaware County and in Wayne County. As the cases grew over the next several days, Wolf ordered all public schools and parks close until further notice. Later that month he ordered a closure of all non-life-sustaining businesses in the state to close physical locations in order to slow the spread of the virus. On April 9, Wolf officially ordered the closing of all schools through the end of the school year, stating that they will resume all classes through means of Google Classroom and other online classroom tools.

On June 23, State Representative Daryl Metcalfe and 24 co-sponsors introduced five articles of impeachment in House Resolution 915 against Wolf based on charges that the mandates he imposed amid the pandemic damaged Pennsylvania's economy and exceeded his authority by unilaterally and unlawfully. The bill was referred to the House Judiciary Committee but moved no further. On September 14, 2020, District Court Judge William S. Stickman IV ruled that the restrictions Wolf imposed during the pandemic were unconstitutional, violating the right to freedom of assembly guaranteed by the First Amendment. State officials asked Stickman to delay his ruling by while they appealed, but he declined. The United States Court of Appeals for the Third Circuit later stayed the decision, allowing the restrictions to resume.

Republican lawmakers brought two questions limiting Wolf's gubernatorial powers to a statewide vote on May 18, 2021, limiting disaster declarations from 90 to 21 days, transferring power to extend emergency orders from the governor to the state legislature and permitting a simple majority of the legislature to terminate such a declaration at any time. Both passed, with publications declaring the measures victorious with 52% of the vote on May 19, making Pennsylvania the first state to approve a curb on a governor's emergency powers since the start of the COVID-19 pandemic.

In March 2021, Wolf announced the state would start rolling out the one-dose Janssen COVID-19 vaccine in order to get students back into the classroom for in-person instruction. In August, Wolf announced that students, teachers, and staff in all public and private K-12 schools and child care facilities would be required to wear masks amid a rise in cases caused by the SARS-CoV-2 Delta variant.

=== Voting ===
In 2019, Wolf signed reforms into law that would allow no-excuse mail-in ballot voting. After the 2020 presidential election, Wolf signed the certificate of ascertainment for the Biden/Harris slate of electors and sent it to the Archivist of the United States. Wolf fought against claims the election was fraudulent and criticized politicians who supported those claims. In June 2021, Wolf vetoed a bill that would have mandated voter identification in statewide elections.

=== Foreign relations ===
Wolf has expressed his opposition to targeting countries with economic sanctions or boycotts, saying, "We ... will not encourage economic punishment in place of peaceful solutions to challenging conflicts" He later singled out Russia as an exception to this policy and immediately declared his support for sanctions and divestment from Russia after the 2022 invasion of Ukraine.

=== Pardons ===
During his eight years as governor, Wolf issued 2,540 pardons, the most for any governor in the state's history. Nearly 400 of them were individuals who had been convicted of marijuana-related offenses. In January 2023, he pardoned rapper Meek Mill for his 2008 conviction on drug and gun offenses.

== Personal life ==
In 1975, Wolf married Frances Donnelly, an oil painter. The couple have two children and resided in York, Pennsylvania. In 2023, he announced that he and his wife were moving to Philadelphia.

On February 24, 2016, Wolf announced that he had been diagnosed with prostate cancer. Because it was diagnosed early, he said it would not hinder his ability to work. After treatment, Wolf's spokesperson announced in January 2017 that Wolf's physician had given him a "clean bill of health".

== Electoral history ==
2014 Democratic gubernatorial primary results
Party	Candidate	Votes	%
Democratic	Tom Wolf	488,917	57.86
Democratic	Allyson Schwartz	149,027	17.64
Democratic	Rob McCord	142,311	16.84
Democratic	Kathleen McGinty	64,754	7.66
Total votes		845,009	100

2014 Pennsylvania gubernatorial election
Party	Candidate	Votes	%	±%
Democratic	Tom Wolf Mike Stack	1,920,355	54.93%	+9.42%
Republican	Tom Corbett (incumbent) Jim Cawley (incumbent)	1,575,511	45.07%	−9.42%
Total votes		3,495,866	100.00%	N/A
Democratic gain from Republican				

2018 Pennsylvania gubernatorial election
Party	Candidate	Votes	%	±%
Democratic	Tom Wolf (incumbent) John Fetterman	2,895,652	57.77%	+2.84%
Republican	Scott Wagner Jeff Bartos	2,039,882	40.70%	−4.37%
Libertarian	Ken Krawchuk Kathleen Smith	49,229	0.98%	N/A
Green	Paul Glover Jocolyn Bowser-Bostick	27,792	0.55%	N/A
Total votes		5,012,555	100.00%	N/A
Democratic hold				

Political offices
Preceded by Tom Corbett	Governor of Pennsylvania; 2015–2023	Succeeded by Josh Shapiro
Party political offices
Preceded by Dan Onorato	Democratic nominee for Governor of Pennsylvania; 2014, 2018	Succeeded by Josh Shapiro
U.S. order of precedence (ceremonial)
Preceded by Tom Corbett as Former Governor	Order of precedence of the United States; Within Pennsylvania	Succeeded by Jack Markell as Former Governor
Preceded by Tom Corbett as Former Governor	Order of precedence of the United States; Outside Pennsylvania	Succeeded by Thomas Kean as Former Governor
