= Tom Palmer (author) =

British author

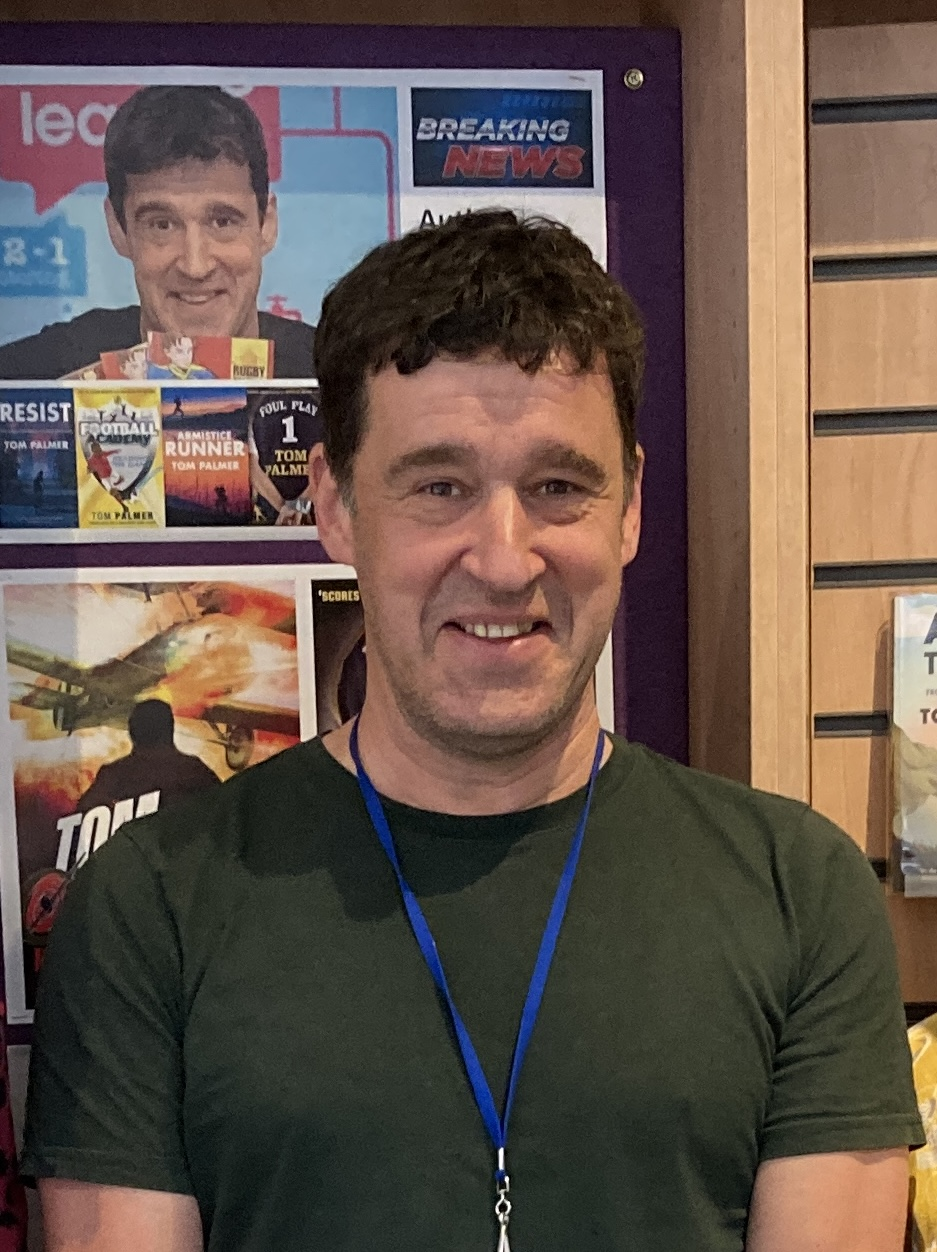
- Tom Palmer in 2023
- Born: 1966 or 1967 (age 58–59); Leeds
- Occupation: Author
- Website: tompalmer.co.uk

Tom Palmer is a British author of children's books.

Palmer was born in Leeds. He cites football articles for getting him interested in reading as a child. He was encouraged to read by his adoptive mother, who died in 1992 at the age of 54. He graduated from university and worked in libraries and book shops before becoming a published author. He published his first book in 2002. His first children's book for Puffin, Foul Play was shortlisted for the Blue Peter Book of the Year Award in 2009. In 2018, Palmer wrote a new book for the Roy of the Rovers series. In 2019, he received the Ruth Rendell Award. In 2020, he published his 50th book.

In 2021, Palmer's book After the War was longlisted for the Carnegie Medal.

Palmer currently lives in Halifax. He is a supporter of Leeds United F.C. and has written a book titled If You're Proud to be a Leeds Fan.

== Select bibliography ==
Palmer has written books on various sports including football, fell-running, cricket, rugby; various themes including refugees, fair-trade young carers and across many historical periods:

- Defenders: Pitch Invasion - Iron Age Celts
- Defenders: Dark Arena - Roman Britain
- Defenders: Killing Ground -Vikings and Anglo Saxons
- Secret FC - Medieval
- Flyboy & Over the Line & Armistice Runner - First World War
- Spitfire & D-Day Dog (2019) & After the War:from Auschwitz to Ambleside (2020) & Arctic Star (2021) & Resist (2022) - Second World War

=== Football Academy series ===
- Teamwork (prequel)
- Boys United
- Striking Out
- Reading the Game
- The Real Thing
- Free Kick
- Captain Fantastic

=== Foul Play series ===
- Foul Play
- Dead Ball
- Offside
- Killer Pass
- Own Goal
