= Young Sherlock Holmes: Black Ice =

2011 book by Andrew Lane

Black Ice
- MacMillan Books 2011 paperback edition.
- Author: Andy Lane
- Language: English
- Series: Young Sherlock Holmes
- Genre: Detective novel
- Published: 2011 (Macmillan Books)
- Publication place: United Kingdom
- Media type: Print (Paperback)
- Pages: 273 pages
- Preceded by: Red Leech
- Followed by: Fire Storm

Young Sherlock Holmes: Black Ice is the third novel in the Young Sherlock Holmes series that depicts Arthur Conan Doyle's detective Sherlock Holmes as a teenager in the 1860s. It was written by Andy Lane and released in the United Kingdom on June 3, 2011 by Macmillan Books. It is preceded in the series by Young Sherlock Holmes: Red Leech and is followed byYoung Sherlock Holmes: Fire Storm.

== Plot summary ==
The character Mycroft Holmes invites Sherlock and his tutor, Amyus Crowe, to London for a visit. When they arrive at the Diogenes Club, they find Mycroft holding a dagger over a dead body. The police arrive and arrest Mycroft, leaving Sherlock and Amyus to prove their brother's innocence. They find clues at the murder scene: a business card, a small bottle with a clear liquid in it, and a small wooden case. They determine that the business card is freshly printed and look for printers around London who might have created it.

The pair split up and Sherlock locates the right Gooder, which leads him to a bouncer in a local tavern. Sherlock tails the bouncer, but the bouncer manages to turn the tables on him and chases Sherlock into the sewers inhabited by London's abandoned and feral children. Sherlock has to run to escape them and ends up at the London Necropolis Railway.

Sherlock and Amyus meetand over Sherlock's neck; his hand is bitten by the dog and he loosens his grip which allows Sherlock to escape.

Sherlock soon finds his way into the Moscow river and climbs up its banks, only to see Mycroft being arrested by Russian secret police-the Third Section. He is met by Robert Wormesley who was watching Mycroft's arrest and tells him that they both will have to plan the next move to save Mycroft's life.

The two men stop by a cafe to have a chat. whereupon Sherlock deduces that Mycroft was being taken to be framed for the murder of Count Shuvalov and that Wormesley is against him. Rufus Stone sets fire to the cafe which helps Sherlock escape from Wormesley. Sherlock and Stone reach the building where Mycroft and Count Shuvalov are located. Once there, they lure away the falcon that was trained to kill Shuvalov.

== Characters ==
=== Sherlock Holmes ===
Stures and he is not afraid to take his own initiative. When he realizes that Amyus will not be accompanying him to Russia, he is initially disappointed and worried about how he will perform without his mentor, but soon grows in confidence. On the other hand, his relationship with Rufus Stone becomes more complex when Mycroft reveals a secret about Stone. His admiration for his older brother Mycroft continues to grow.

=== Mycroft Holmes ===
Sherlock's older brother, who works in espionage, invites Sherlock and Amyus to visit him in London and is quickly framed for murder. In an unprecedented move, Mycroft breaks his fixed orbit and takes a trip to Russia to investigate whether or not events in that country are related to his murder accusation.

=== Amyus Crowe ===
Amyus helps Sherlock investigate Mycroft's murder accusation. Being Sherlock's tutor, he is attempting to hone his observational and deductive skills.
