= Young Sherlock Holmes: Red Leech =

2010 book by Andrew Lane

- MacMillan Books 2010 paperback edition
- Author: Andrew Lane
- Language: English
- Series: Young Sherlock Holmes
- Genre: Detective novel
- Published: 2010 (Macmillan Books)
- Publication place: United Kingdom
- Media type: Print (Paperback)
- Pages: 352 pages
- Preceded by: Death Cloud
- Followed by: Black Ice

Young Sherlock Holmes: Red Leech (U.S. edition title: Rebel Fire) is the second novel in the Young Sherlock Holmes series that depicts Arthur Conan Doyle's detective Sherlock Holmes as a teenager in the 1860s. It was written by Andrew Lane and released in the United Kingdom on 5 November 2010 by Macmillan Books. It is a sequel to Young Sherlock Holmes: Death Cloud and was followed by Young Sherlock Holmes: Black Ice which was released on 26 May 2011.

== Plot summary ==
A few months following the events of the following book, Sherlock Holmes is pleased when Mycroft comes to visit him at Holmes Manor in Hampshire, but Mycroft's visit has a serious purpose, he has come to let Amyus Crowe know that British Intelligence suspect that John Wilkes Booth has come to England under the alias to John St. Helen. Without any encouragement from Mycroft or Amyus, Sherlock sets off to Godalming where Booth is suspected of hiding out, enlisting Matty Arnatt's help along the way.

Sherlock and Matty locate the house in Godalming that Booth is suspected of living in, and Sherlock, under the pretense of picking up a ball that Matty threw onto the property, enters the grounds. Sherlock is kidnapped and dragged into the house by a mentally deranged man whose face is burned and scarred on one side. Sherlock escapes and flees, but the man gives chase, and they both end up on the roof of the house. Three fellow conspirators arrive and knock out the insane man, who is revealed to be John Wilkes Booth. The three plan to kill Sherlock, but he escapes with Matty's help and immediately returns to Holmes Manor to inform Mycroft and Amyus of the events that transpired. They are somewhat disappointed that Sherlock has let the conspirators know that they are under investigation.

The next morning, the Holmes brothers visit Amyus who concludes that the conspirators will have taken flight and left the Godalming house. Virginia is sent to fetch Matty, but on the way back they are attacked and Matty is kidnapped. Amyus, Sherlock, and Virginia give chase, but the conspirators escape after shooting at and grazing Amyus. Sherlock manages to knock out one of the three and he is arrested.

Sherlock, Virginia, Amyus, and Mycroft deduce from a coded message that the other conspirators will be heading to America, so Sherlock, Amyus, and Virginia make plans to follow them. On the boat to America, Sherlock meets Rufus, a violinist who wishes to teach in America, as well as a man who is heading to the Americas to make advances in the hot air balloon industry. Sherlock is also attacked by a deckhand paid off to kill him, but Sherlock knocks the man into the machinery cogs in the bowels of the ship.

Once they reach America, Sherlock manages to locate where Matty is being held and he and Virginia follow the conspirators (and Matty) aboard a train. The conspirators find Sherlock and Virginia, and after a perilous fight on the roof of the train in which another conspirator is killed, Sherlock is captured and the train is diverted to the headquarters of the organizer of the conspiracy, Duke Balthassar. In conversation with Balthassar, it becomes clear that the conspirators, who are all confederate supporters, plan to invade Canada and have it become a new Confederate country. John Wilkes Booth would be the figurehead for the army, but his mental state prevents any other usefulness. Balthassar also suffers from a blood disease that causes him to constantly utilize leeches to thin his blood clots, and has very breakable bones. Sherlock, Virginia, and Matty are locked in a cage with several crocodiles, but they manage to escape and make contact with Amyus.

Amyus and the US government plan to drop bombs from hot air balloons onto the confederate army's camp, which Sherlock is determined to stop because he knows it would be a massacre. Sherlock manages to destroy the hot air balloons using flaming arrows, but on his way back to where he, Amyus, Virginia, and Matty are staying he is attacked by Duke Balthassar. Balthassar sends his two pet cougars after Sherlock, but Sherlock manages to turn the cougars onto their master by breaking Balthassar's arm. The cougars attack and kill their master before leaving Sherlock in peace.

The confederate army falls apart on their own and Sherlock, Virginia, Amyus, and Matty return to England. On the boat, Sherlock once again encounters Rufus, whose plans in America had fallen through. Rufus asks Sherlock if he knows anyone who needs a violin teacher, to which Sherlock responds that he does.

== Characters ==
=== Sherlock Holmes ===
Sherlock Holmes who has grown since the events of Death Cloud and is not afraid to do things on his own initiative. He has formed close friendships with Amyus, Matty and Virginia, and his admiration for his older brother Mycroft continues to increase. While travelling to America he meets an Irish violin player and tutor named Rufus Stone who begins to teach him how to play the violin, and although it seems Amyus disapproves of this relationship and finds music unimportant and wasteful, Sherlock seems by the end of the book to be fast friends with Rufus. He is fourteen years old.

=== Mycroft Holmes ===
Sherlock's older brother, who works in the innermost workings of the British government, comes to visit Sherlock and Amyus at Holmes Manor but says that he could not picture the idea of going to America, that he has a fixed orbit that he likes to stick to it.

=== Matty Arnatt ===
His friendship with Sherlock and his sense of adventure means that he helps Sherlock in his attempts to locate and identify John Wilkes Booth, which results in Matty's kidnapping to America. He is almost the exact opposite of Sherlock; ex: He is instinctive while Sherlock is calculating.

=== Amyus Crowe ===
His role with the Jacksons is revealed in the course of this adventure as well as his skills as a tracker and a hunter. He is a friend and father figure to Sherlock.

=== Virginia Crowe ===
Amyus Crowe's daughter. She is very headstrong and hates being inside. Likes to ride her horse, Sandia. She also seems to have emotions towards Sherlock that boggle his mind.

=== Rufus Stone ===
A violin player and tutor from Ireland who seems to be on the run from trouble in his home country. He travels to America to find a new life and spends the majority of the eight-day journey tutoring Sherlock on the violin. Unfortunately when he reaches America his past life catches up with him and he is forced to return to England where he meets Sherlock again.

=== Mrs. Eglantine ===
Mrs Eglantine is seen to have real power in Holmes Manor and appears to have some hold over her employers.

=== Duke Balthassar ===
Duke Balthassar is the mastermind behind the conspiracy, and because of a medical condition that runs in his family, he has developed a bizarre symbiotic relationship with leeches. They help his blood not clot and, for the most part, keep him alive.

== Background ==
The Red Leech was mentioned in "The Adventure of the Golden Pince-Nez", Watson is reviewing his journals of Sherlock's adventures and says "As I turn over the pages I see my notes upon the repulsive story of the red leech."

This novel introduces the character of Rufus Stone (originally Jared Stone) who provides a counterpoint to Aymus Crowe and helps to explain Holmes' violin playing and melancholy.

The US edition of Red Leech is being published during 2011 under the title Rebel Fire.
