= Young Sherlock Holmes (books) =

Series of young adult thriller novels by Andrew Lane

- Death Cloud; Red Leech; Black Ice; Fire Storm; Snake Bite; Knife Edge; Stone Cold; Night Break
- Author: Andrew Lane
- Country: United Kingdom
- Language: English
- Genre: Thriller, Spy fiction
- Publisher: Macmillan Books (UK)
- Published: 4 June 2010 – Ongoing
- Media type: Print (hardcover and paperback); Audiobook
- Website: www.youngsherlock.com

Young Sherlock Holmes is a series of young adult thriller novels by British author Andrew Lane featuring Arthur Conan Doyle's detective Sherlock Holmes as a teenager in the 1860s and 70s that is faced with numerous mysteries, crimes and adventures throughout the series.

== Books in the series ==
So far there have been eight books released in the series, with the eighth book released in September 2015.

- Death Cloud (June 2010): Fourteen-year-old Sherlock Holmes is sent to live with his Aunt and Uncle in Hampshire and teams up with Matty Arnatt to investigate two mysterious deaths which appear to be somehow related to a black cloud which Sherlock Holmes has to solve.
- Red Leech, retitled Rebel Fire for the American market, (November 2010): A few months after the events of the first novel, Holmes investigates the possibility that John Wilkes Booth is alive and well, and living in England. The investigation takes Sherlock to America with his tutor, Amyus Crowe.
- Black Ice (June 2011): Mycroft invites Sherlock and his tutor to London for a visit, but when they arrive at the Diogenes Club they find Mycroft with a dagger in his hand and a dead body on the floor. The adventure takes them from the depths of the London sewers to the frozen Russian landscapes.
- Fire Storm (November 2011): Fourteen-year-old Sherlock has come up against some challenges in his time, but what confronts him now is completely baffling. His tutor, Crowe, and Crowe's daughter, Virginia, have vanished. Their house looks as if nobody has ever lived there.
- Snake Bite (September 27, 2012): Sherlock finds himself facing another mystery after being kidnapped and taken to China on a ship named as the Gloria Scott.
- Knife Edge (October 2013): Takes place in Ireland. Following the events of the last book Sherlock returns home to find himself stuck in the middle of a kidnapping.
- Stone Cold (September 2014): Following his last adventure, Sherlock Holmes has been sent to live in Oxford to focus on his education but something strange is happening in the university pathology labs.
- Night Break (September 2015): Sherlock's mother has died, his father has gone missing in India and his sister is acting strangely. The Holmes family seems to be falling apart, and not even brother Mycroft can keep it together. A mysterious disappearance leads them to Egypt and the Suez Canal.

== Background ==
Based on the success of Charlie Higson's bestselling Young Bond series, the estate of Sir Arthur Conan Doyle authorised a series of books detailing the life of the teenage Sherlock Holmes.

One of Andrew Lane's key aims is to explain some of the complexities of Holmes' character, who is scientific and analytical on the one hand, and artistic and moody on the other. Two new characters introduced in this series, his two tutors, Amyus Crowe and Rufus Stone, will help shed light on the formation of the two sides of his character evident in later life.

Lane also wanted to ensure that his stories jibed with the original Doyle stories as it bothered him that Watson was presented as a young friend of Holmes in Young Sherlock Holmes which contradicts the events of A Study in Scarlet.

In the 10-page proposal that I put together, it was important that the series took Sherlock from being a 14-year-old boy at school, through university, and leads seamlessly to the opening lines of the first of Doyle's Sherlock novels. I didn't want them to be seen as period pieces with Victorian wood-cut-style covers, but as contemporary, 21st-century books.

Lane's initial proposal provided ideas for potential plots for entries in the series;

- The Giant Rat of Sumatra (mentioned in "The Adventure of the Sussex Vampire")
- The Remarkable Worm Unknown to Science (mentioned in "The Problem of Thor Bridge")
- Colonel Warburton's Madness (mentioned in "The Adventure of the Engineer's Thumb")
- The Segregation of the Queen (mentioned in "His Last Bow")

== Reception ==
Chicago Tribune gave Death Cloud a positive review stating:

For a reader who has outgrown the Hardy Boys' adventures but still seeks mystery-solving plots, Andrew Lane's invention of a teenage Sherlock Holmes will seem timely.

Graham Moore, author of The Sherlockian, reviewed Death Cloud for The New York Times and stated:

Lane is attempting a curious feat: to update and adapt Sherlock Holmes for a new generation, much the way Guy Ritchie has done with a swashbuckling Sherlock on screen....Yet, in the end, the novel strives to rescue Holmes from the prejudices of his creator, and thereby expand the pool of Holmes devotees. For that we can all be grateful.

== Adaptation ==
A television adaptation entitled Young Sherlock was produced for Prime Video, with Guy Ritchie directing, and Hero Fiennes Tiffin starring as Holmes.

Matthew Parkhill served as showrunner with Peter Harness, Kt Roberts, and Steve Thompson on the writing team. Filming took place in Cardiff, Wales.

The series premiered March 4, 2026.

== See also ==
- The Boy Sherlock Holmes
- Young Sherlock Holmes
