= Young Sherlock Holmes: Death Cloud =

Book by Andrew Lane

- MacMillan Books 2010 paperback edition.
- Author: Andrew Lane
- Language: English
- Series: Young Sherlock Holmes
- Genre: Detective novel
- Published: 2010 (Macmillan Books)
- Publication place: United Kingdom
- Media type: Print (Paperback) (Hard Cover)
- Pages: 310 pp (first edition, paperback)
- ISBN: 0-330-51198-X (first edition, paperback)
- Followed by: Red Leech

Young Sherlock Holmes: Death Cloud is the first novel in the Young Sherlock Holmes series that depicts Arthur Conan Doyle's detective Sherlock Holmes as a teenager in the 1860s and 70s. It was written by Andrew Lane and released in the UK on June 4, 2010 by Macmillan Books.

== Plot ==
After a month of holidays, Sherlock discovers that his brother Mycroft has hired him an unusual American tutor named Amyus Crowe. During their first lesson together Sherlock finds a dead body on the Holmes' estate and witnesses the same cloud surrounding the body that Matty had previously seen. He detects an orange powdery substance around the body and takes a sample of it.

With Matty's help, he tracks down a warehouse that has links to one of the deceased, and almost dies in the warehouse when the villains set it alight. Holmes escapes the building, and determines that he must travel to Guildford and locate an expert in exotic diseases who might help identify the yellow substance. He, therefore, sets out with Matty.

A few days later Sherlock is lured to a fair, where he is forced to participate in a boxing match, from which he is kidnapped and interrogated by the unseen Baron Martuis until he is rescued by Matty and the pair go to his tutor's home. Knowing that the Baron has left his headquarters, Sherlock, Matty, Crowe, and Virginia determine to follow and locate the Baron.

They discover that the Baron is shipping a weapon from a London wharf, and after a series of chases, Sherlock and Virginia are kidnapped to France by the Baron, and further interrogated. The Baron attacks Sherlock as Mr. Surd attacks Virginia. The pair escape and meet up with Crowe and Matty and set out to stop the Baron from trying to destroy the British Army. They find a fort where Mr. Surd is. Sherlock engages in a fight with Mr. Surd, and Sherlock kills him by shoving him into a beehive, resulting in multiple stings from angry bees. They throw pollen in the air and burn it, destroying the fort.

Sherlock wakes up and meets Crowe and Matty and they discuss matters. As he glances outside the window, Holmes sees the Baron passing by his home in a carriage.

== Characters ==
=== Sherlock Holmes ===
A 14-year-old who is somewhat of a lone wolf but longs for friendship. He is attending Deepdene School for Boys (a boarding school) and because of his father's sudden orders to ship off to India, he is required to stay with his aunt and uncle in Farnham. When he starts his holiday, he is a curious and slightly naive young man, but through the series of events that occur in the book Holmes matures and is changed profoundly, he has faced death, found love and defeated true evil. In terms of his relationships, he idolizes his older brother Mycroft, he likes Matty who becomes his new sidekick, has developed confused feelings for Virginia, and is intrigued by the mysterious astute/private tutor Amyus Crowe. He uses his detective skills to track down the Baron and figure out what this mysterious death

=== Mycroft Holmes ===
Sherlock's older brother who works for the Foreign Office in London.

=== Matty Arnatt ===
He is an orphan boy from London and has a boat. A mysterious boy, he has many secrets. His father died in war.

=== Amyus Crowe ===
An American hunter and tracker who is a highly unusual tutor preferring to focus on practical learning. He is described as a large man with white hair and a large beard. He is doing undercover work in Britain tracking down American Civil War criminals.

=== Virginia Crowe ===
Amyus Crowe's daughter, unhappy with England because of a negative experience she and her father experienced on the way to the United Kingdom, is a free-spirited, outspoken girl. She is described to be a red-haired lass with violet eyes, tanned skin, and freckles. She is an excellent horseback rider that is said to ride like a man.

=== Mrs. Eglantine ===
Mrs Eglantine is the housekeeper at Holmes Manor; she is sinister and does not welcome new guests. Mycroft Holmes told Sherlock in a letter, that she is "no friend to the Holmes family".

=== Baron Maupertuis ===
The Baron is the mastermind behind the mystery of the Death Cloud, and because of serious injuries sustained by him at the Charge of the Light Brigade his locomotion is achieved in a unique way, akin to a puppet (his servants control strings attached to his limbs). He hates the British Empire and plans to destroy the British Army with the bees. He put chemicals in the uniforms that the bees are attracted to.

== Background ==
Based on the success of Charlie Higson's bestselling Young Bond series, the estate of Sir Arthur Conan Doyle authorised a series of books detailing the life of the teenage Sherlock Holmes. When the series was first in development, the title of Death Cloud was initially to be called either The Colossal Schemes of Baron Maupertuis or Sherlock Holmes and the Shadow of the Marionette. The Colossal Schemes of Baron Maupertuis is an adventure mentioned in "The Adventure of the Reigate Squire". Maupertuis had already appeared as a character in Lane's Doctor Who/Sherlock Holmes crossover novel, All-Consuming Fire.

One of Lane's key aims is to explain some of the complexities of Holmes' character, who is scientific and analytical on the one hand, and artistic and moody on the other. Two new characters introduced in this series, his two tutors, Amyus Crowe and Rufus Stone, will help shed light on the formation of the two sides of his character evident in later life.

Lane decided to set the book in 19th-century Farnham in Surrey as at the time he was writing it he was working for the Ministry of Defence in Farnborough in Hampshire and living nearby in Ash which made researching for the book "easier than setting it in Yorkshire and having to travel for hours to check facts".

== Reception ==
Chicago Tribune gave Death Cloud a positive review stating:

For a reader who has outgrown the Hardy Boys' adventures but still seeks mystery-solving plots, Andrew Lane's invention of a teenage Sherlock Holmes will seem timely.

Graham Moore, author of The Sherlockian, reviewed Death Cloud for The New York Times and stated:

Lane is attempting a curious feat: to update and adapt Sherlock Holmes for a new generation, much the way Guy Ritchie has done with a swashbuckling Sherlock on screen....Yet, in the end, the novel strives to rescue Holmes from the prejudices of his creator, and thereby expand the pool of Holmes devotees. For that we can all be grateful.

== Sequels ==
A sequel entitled Red Leech (which was mentioned in "The Adventure of the Golden Pince-Nez") features Sherlock accompanying his tutor Amyus Crowe to America.
