= 2014 Pennsylvania elections =

- November 4, 2014

Elections were held in Pennsylvania on November 4, 2014. Primary elections were held on May 20, 2014.

All 203 seats of the Pennsylvania House of Representatives, 25 seats of the Pennsylvania Senate, as well as the Governor and Lieutenant Governor were up for election.

== Pennsylvania Gubernatorial ==
- 2014 Pennsylvania gubernatorial election

== Pennsylvania Lieutenant Gubernatorial ==
- 2014 Pennsylvania lieutenant gubernatorial election

== Pennsylvania General Assembly ==
- 2014 Pennsylvania House of Representatives election
- 2014 Pennsylvania Senate elections

== See also ==
- United States House of Representatives elections in Pennsylvania, 2014
