= 2014 United States House of Representatives elections in Pennsylvania =

- November 4, 2014

All 18 Pennsylvania seats to the United States House of Representatives
	Majority party	Minority party
Party	Republican	Democratic
Last election	13	5
Seats won	13	5
Seat change	Steady	Steady
Popular vote	1,833,205	1,467,594
Percentage	55.54%	44.46%
Swing	▲6.77%	▼5.82%

Republican hold Democratic hold
Republican
40–50%
50–60%
60–70%
70–80%
80–90%
>90%
Democratic
40–50%
50–60%
60–70%
80–90%
>90%

The 2014 United States House of Representatives elections in Pennsylvania were held on Tuesday, November 4, 2014, to elect the 18 U.S. representatives from the Commonwealth of Pennsylvania, one from each of the state's 18 congressional districts. The elections coincided with other elections to the United States Senate and House of Representatives and various state and local elections, including the Governor of Pennsylvania and Lieutenant Governor of Pennsylvania. This was the highest Republican turnout in modern elections.

== Overview ==
=== Statewide ===
Party	Candidates	Votes		Seats		
Party	Candidates	No.	%	No.	+/–	%
Republican	17	1,833,205	55.16	13	Steady	72.22
Democratic	16	1,467,594	44.16	5	Steady	27.78
Independent	1	22,734	0.68	0	Steady	0.0
Total	34	3,323,533	100.0	18	Steady	100.0

Popular vote
Republican	55.16%
Democratic	44.16%
Other	0.68%

House seats
Republican	72.22%
Democratic	27.78%

=== District ===
Results of the 2014 United States House of Representatives elections in Pennsylvania by district:

District	Republican		Democratic		Others		Total		Result
District	Votes	%	Votes	%	Votes	%	Votes	%	Result
District 1	27,193	17.16%	131,248	82.84%	0	0.00%	158,441	100.00%	Democratic hold
District 2	25,397	12.30%	181,141	87.70%	0	0.00%	206,538	100.00%	Democratic hold
District 3	113,859	60.63%	73,931	39.37%	0	0.00%	187,790	100.00%	Republican hold
District 4	147,090	74.54%	50,250	25.46%	0	0.00%	197,340	100.00%	Republican hold
District 5	115,018	63.60%	65,839	36.40%	0	0.00%	180,857	100.00%	Republican hold
District 6	119,643	56.29%	92,901	43.71%	0	0.00%	212,544	100.00%	Republican hold
District 7	145,869	62.04%	89,256	37.96%	0	0.00%	235,125	100.00%	Republican hold
District 8	137,731	61.90%	84,767	38.10%	0	0.00%	222,498	100.00%	Republican hold
District 9	110,094	63.52%	63,223	36.48%	0	0.00%	173,317	100.00%	Republican hold
District 10	112,851	62.58%	44,737	24.81%	22,734	12.61%	180,322	100.00%	Republican hold
District 11	122,464	66.31%	62,228	33.69%	0	0.00%	184,692	100.00%	Republican hold
District 12	127,993	59.28%	87,928	40.72%	0	0.00%	215,921	100.00%	Republican hold
District 13	60,549	32.88%	123,601	67.12%	0	0.00%	184,150	100.00%	Democratic hold
District 14	0	0.00%	148,351	100.00%	0	0.00%	148,351	100.00%	Democratic hold
District 15	128,285	100.00%	0	0.00%	0	0.00%	128,285	100.00%	Republican hold
District 16	101,722	57.72%	74,513	42.28%	0	0.00%	176,235	100.00%	Republican hold
District 17	71,371	43.24%	93,680	56.76%	0	0.00%	165,051	100.00%	Democratic hold
District 18	166,076	100.00%	0	0.00%	0	0.00%	166,076	100.00%	Republican hold
Total	1,833,205	55.16%	1,467,594	44.16%	22,734	0.68%	3,323,533	100.00%	

== District 1 ==
2014 Pennsylvania's 1st congressional district election
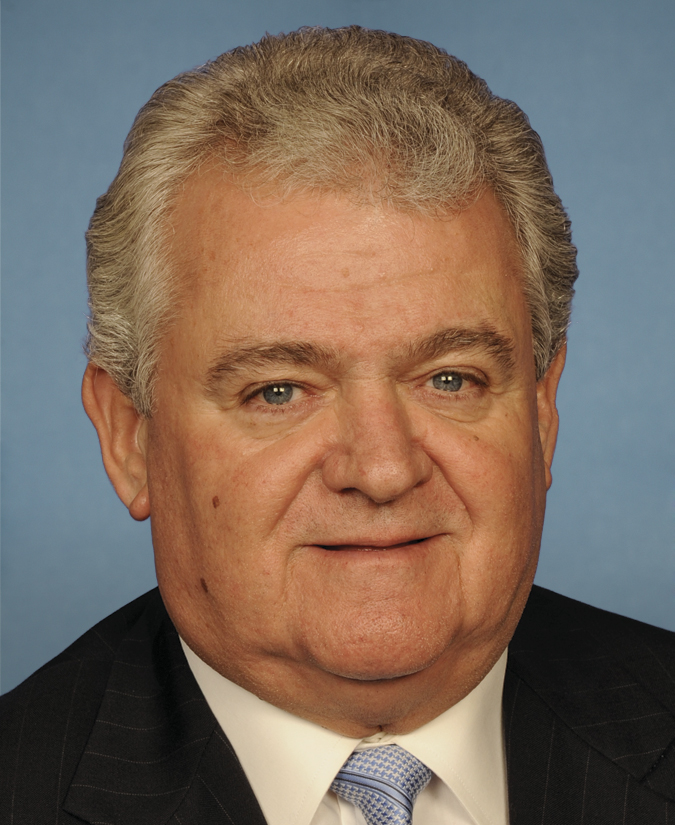

Nominee	Bob Brady	Megan Rath
Party	Democratic	Republican
Popular vote	131,248	27,193
Percentage	82.8%	17.2%
- County results Brady: 70–80% 80–90%
U.S. Representative before election
Bob Brady
Democratic
Elected U.S. Representative
Bob Brady
Democratic

The 1st district includes central and South Philadelphia, the City of Chester, the Philadelphia International Airport and other small sections of Delaware County. The incumbent was Democrat Bob Brady, who had represented the district since 1998. He was re-elected with 85% of the vote in 2012 and the district has a PVI of D+28.

=== Democratic primary ===
==== Candidates ====
===== Nominee =====
- Bob Brady, incumbent U.S. Representative

==== Primary results ====
Democratic primary results
Party	Candidate	Votes	%
Democratic	Bob Brady (incumbent)	47,565	100.0

=== Republican primary ===
==== Candidates ====
===== Nominee =====
- Megan Rath, medical-equipment saleswoman

==== Primary results ====
Republican primary results
Party	Candidate	Votes	%
Republican	Megan Rath	6,995	100.0

=== General election ===
==== Endorsements ====
Bob Brady (D)

Labor unions

- AFL-CIO
- National Association of Letter Carriers

Organizations

- Human Rights Campaign
- National Organization for Women
- Sierra Club

==== Predictions ====
Source	Ranking	As of
The Cook Political Report	Safe D	November 3, 2014
Rothenberg	Safe D	October 24, 2014
Sabato's Crystal Ball	Safe D	October 30, 2014
RCP	Safe D	November 2, 2014
Daily Kos Elections	Safe D	November 4, 2014

==== Results ====
Pennsylvania's 1st congressional district, 2014
Party	Candidate	Votes	%
Democratic	Bob Brady (incumbent)	131,248	82.8
Republican	Megan Rath	27,193	17.2
Total votes		158,441	100.0
Democratic hold			

== District 2 ==
2014 Pennsylvania's 2nd congressional district election
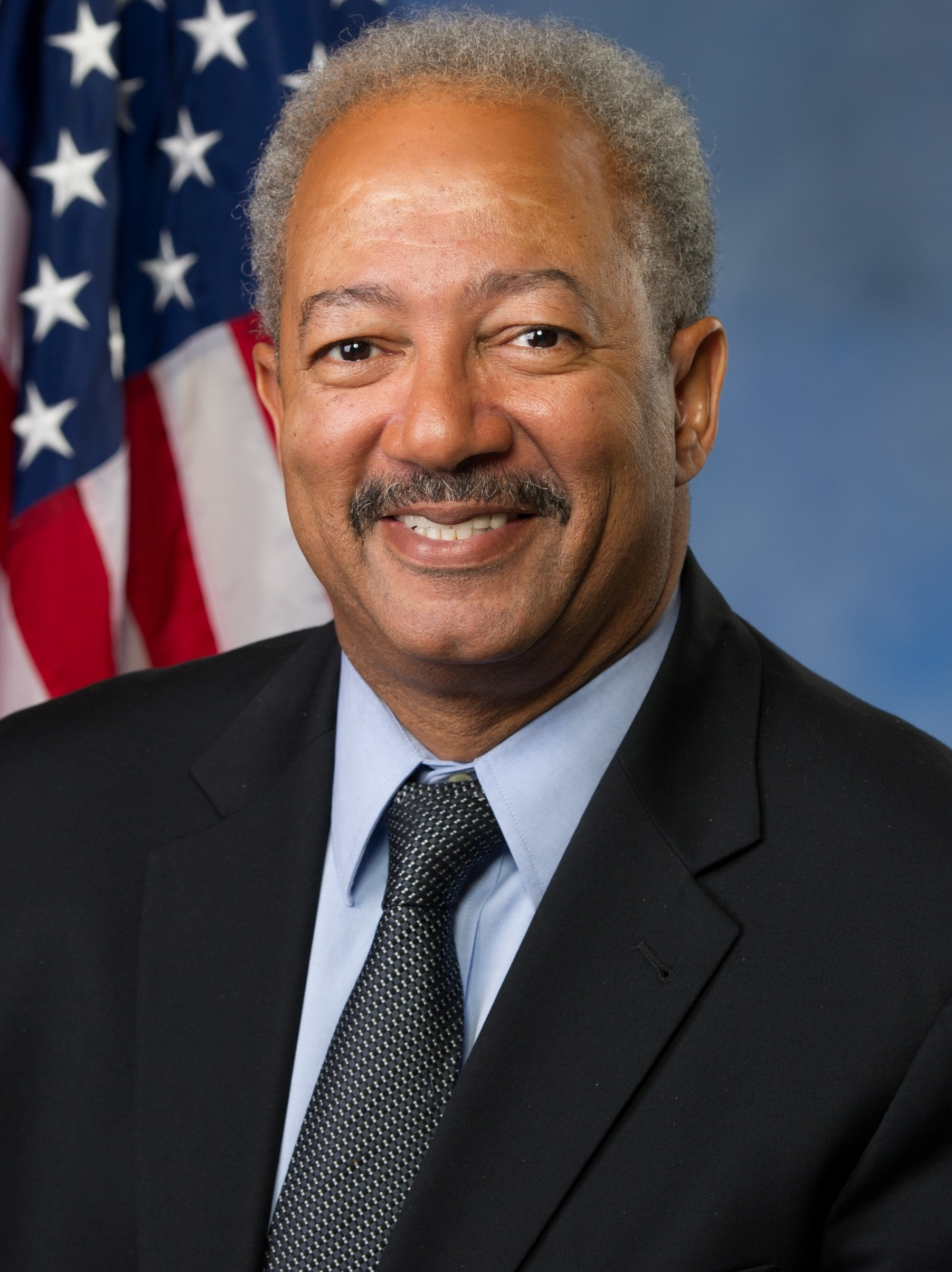

Nominee	Chaka Fattah	Armond James
Party	Democratic	Republican
Popular vote	181,141	25,397
Percentage	87.7%	12.3%
- County results Fattah: 60–70% 90–100%
U.S. Representative before election
Chaka Fattah
Democratic
Elected U.S. Representative
Chaka Fattah
Democratic

The 2nd district includes parts of West Philadelphia, North Philadelphia and Northwest Philadelphia in addition to Lower Merion Township in Montgomery County. The incumbent was Democrat Chaka Fattah, who had represented the district since 1995. He was re-elected with 89% of the vote in 2012 and the district has a PVI of D+38.

=== Democratic primary ===
==== Candidates ====
===== Nominee =====
- Chaka Fattah, incumbent U.S. Representative

==== Primary results ====
Democratic primary results
Party	Candidate	Votes	%
Democratic	Chaka Fattah (incumbent)	82,167	100.0

=== Republican primary ===
==== Candidates ====
===== Nominee =====
- Armond James, schoolteacher

==== Primary results ====
Republican primary results
Party	Candidate	Votes	%
Republican	Armond James	3,117	100.0

=== General election ===
==== Endorsements ====
Chaka Fattah (D)

Labor unions

- AFL-CIO
- National Association of Letter Carriers

Organizations

- Everytown for Gun Safety
- Human Rights Campaign
- National Organization for Women
- Sierra Club
Armond James (R)

Organizations

- Eagle Forum

Newspapers

- The Philadelphia Inquirer

==== Predictions ====
Source	Ranking	As of
The Cook Political Report	Safe D	November 3, 2014
Rothenberg	Safe D	October 24, 2014
Sabato's Crystal Ball	Safe D	October 30, 2014
RCP	Safe D	November 2, 2014
Daily Kos Elections	Safe D	November 4, 2014

==== Results ====
Pennsylvania's 2nd congressional district, 2014
Party	Candidate	Votes	%
Democratic	Chaka Fattah (incumbent)	181,141	87.7
Republican	Armond James	25,397	12.3
Total votes		206,538	100.0
Democratic hold			

== District 3 ==
2014 Pennsylvania's 3rd congressional district election
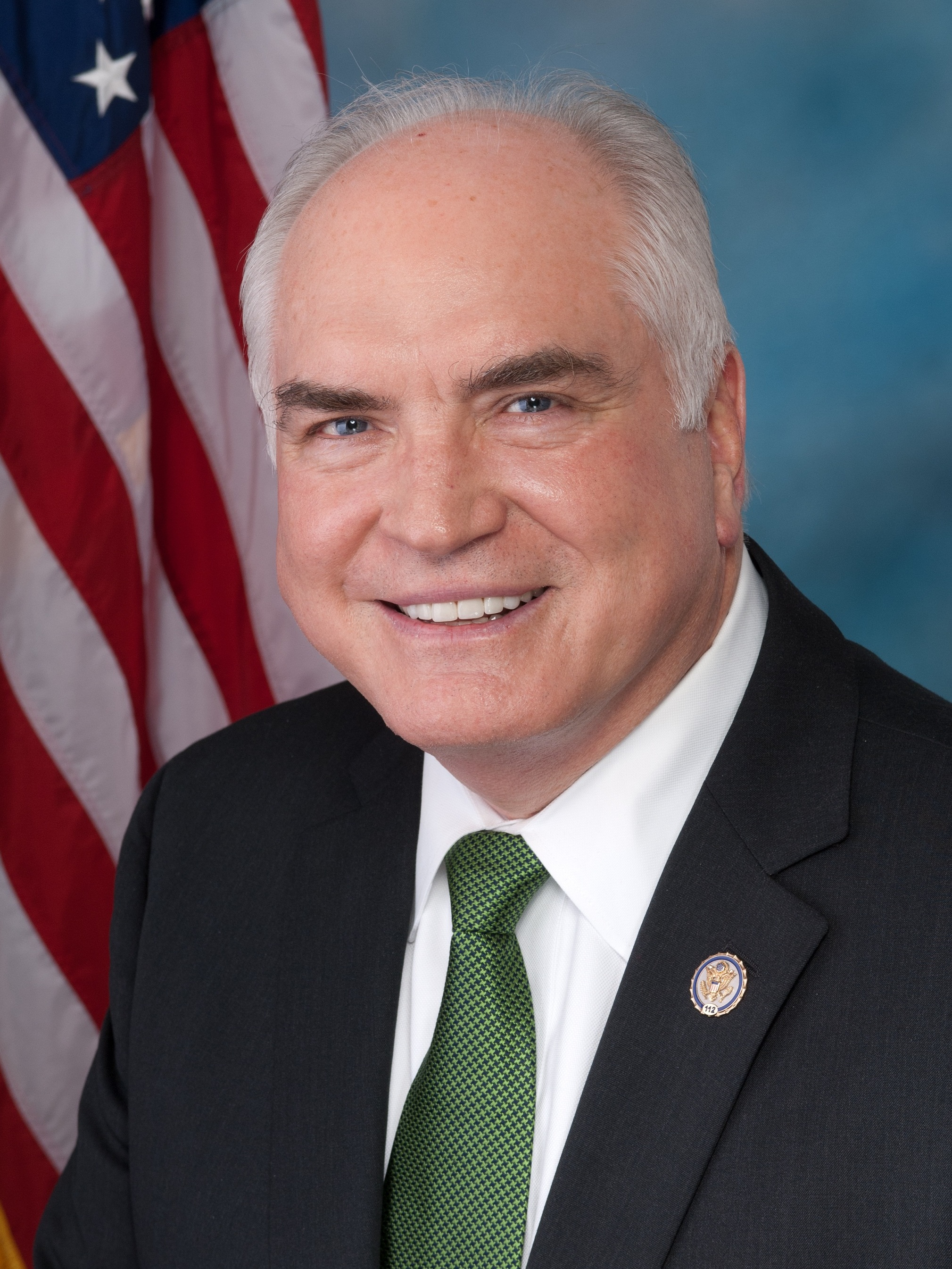

Nominee	Mike Kelly	Dan LaVallee
Party	Republican	Democratic
Popular vote	113,859	73,931
Percentage	60.6%	39.4%
- County results Kelly: 50–60% 60–70% 70–80% Lavallee: 50–60%
U.S. representative before election
Mike Kelly
Republican
Elected U.S. representative
Mike Kelly
Republican

The 3rd district is located in Northwestern Pennsylvania and includes the cities of Erie, Sharon, Hermitage, Butler and Meadville. The incumbent was Republican Mike Kelly, who had represented the district since 2011. He was re-elected with 55% of the vote in 2012 and the district has a PVI of R+8.

=== Republican primary ===
==== Candidates ====
===== Nominee =====
- Mike Kelly, incumbent U.S. Representative

==== Primary results ====
Republican primary results
Party	Candidate	Votes	%
Republican	Mike Kelly (incumbent)	33,475	100.0

=== Democratic primary ===
==== Candidates ====
===== Nominee =====
- Dan LaVallee, former deputy director in the America's Health Insurance Plans's product policy department

===== Withdrawn =====
- Rob Joswiak, Air Force veteran
- Matt Ryan, veteran

==== Primary results ====
Democratic primary results
Party	Candidate	Votes	%
Democratic	Dan LaVallee	30,153	100.0

=== General election ===
==== Endorsements ====
Mike Kelly (R)

Organizations

- Eagle Forum
- National Federation of Independent Business
- National Rifle Association - Political Victory Fund
- National Right to Life Committee

Newspapers

- Pittsburgh Tribune-Review
Dan LaVallee (D)

Labor unions

- AFL-CIO

Organizations

- Alliance for Retired Americans

==== Predictions ====
Source	Ranking	As of
The Cook Political Report	Safe R	November 3, 2014
Rothenberg	Safe R	October 24, 2014
Sabato's Crystal Ball	Safe R	October 30, 2014
RCP	Safe R	November 2, 2014
Daily Kos Elections	Safe R	November 4, 2014

==== Results ====
Pennsylvania's 3rd congressional district, 2014
Party	Candidate	Votes	%
Republican	Mike Kelly (incumbent)	113,859	60.6
Democratic	Dan LaVallee	73,931	39.4
Total votes		187,790	100.0
Republican hold			

== District 4 ==
2014 Pennsylvania's 4th congressional district election
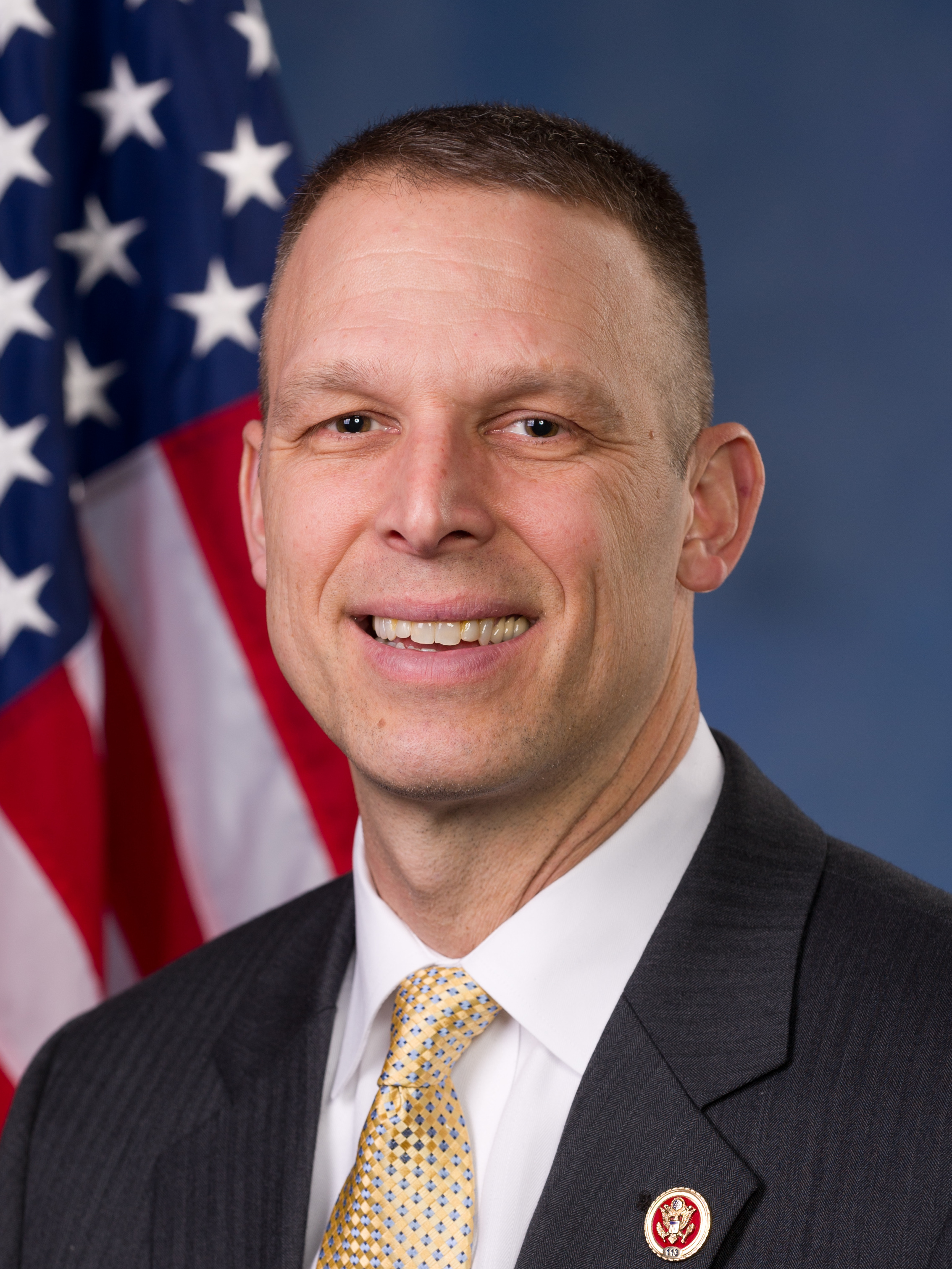

Nominee	Scott Perry	Linda D. Thompson
Party	Republican	Democratic
Popular vote	147,090	50,250
Percentage	74.5%	25.5%
- County results Perry: 70–80% 80–90% Thompson: 50–60%
U.S. Representative before election
Scott Perry
Republican
Elected U.S. Representative
Scott Perry
Republican

The 4th district is located in South Central Pennsylvania and includes all of Adams and York counties and parts of Cumberland County. The incumbent was Republican Scott Perry, who had represented the district since 2013. He was elected with 60% of the vote in 2012 and the district has a PVI of R+9.

=== Republican primary ===
==== Candidates ====
===== Nominee =====
- Scott Perry, incumbent U.S. Representative

==== Primary results ====
Republican primary results
Party	Candidate	Votes	%
Republican	Scott Perry (incumbent)	35,020	100.0

=== Democratic primary ===
==== Candidates ====
===== Nominee =====
- Linda D. Thompson, former Mayor of Harrisburg

==== Primary results ====
Democratic primary results
Party	Candidate	Votes	%
Democratic	Linda D. Thompson	24,312	100.0

=== General election ===
==== Endorsements ====
Scott Perry (R)

Organizations

- Eagle Forum
- National Federation of Independent Business
- National Rifle Association - Political Victory Fund
- National Right to Life Committee
- No Labels

Newspapers

- The Patriot-News
Linda D. Thompson (D)

U.S. Representatives

- Joe Sestak, Representative for Pennsylvania's 7th congressional district (2007–2011) and nominee for the Senate in 2010

==== Predictions ====
Source	Ranking	As of
The Cook Political Report	Safe R	November 3, 2014
Rothenberg	Safe R	October 24, 2014
Sabato's Crystal Ball	Safe R	October 30, 2014
RCP	Safe R	November 2, 2014
Daily Kos Elections	Safe R	November 4, 2014

==== Results ====
Pennsylvania's 4th congressional district, 2014
Party	Candidate	Votes	%
Republican	Scott Perry (incumbent)	147,090	74.5
Democratic	Linda D. Thompson	50,250	25.5
Total votes		197,340	100.0
Republican hold			

== District 5 ==
2014 Pennsylvania's 5th congressional district election
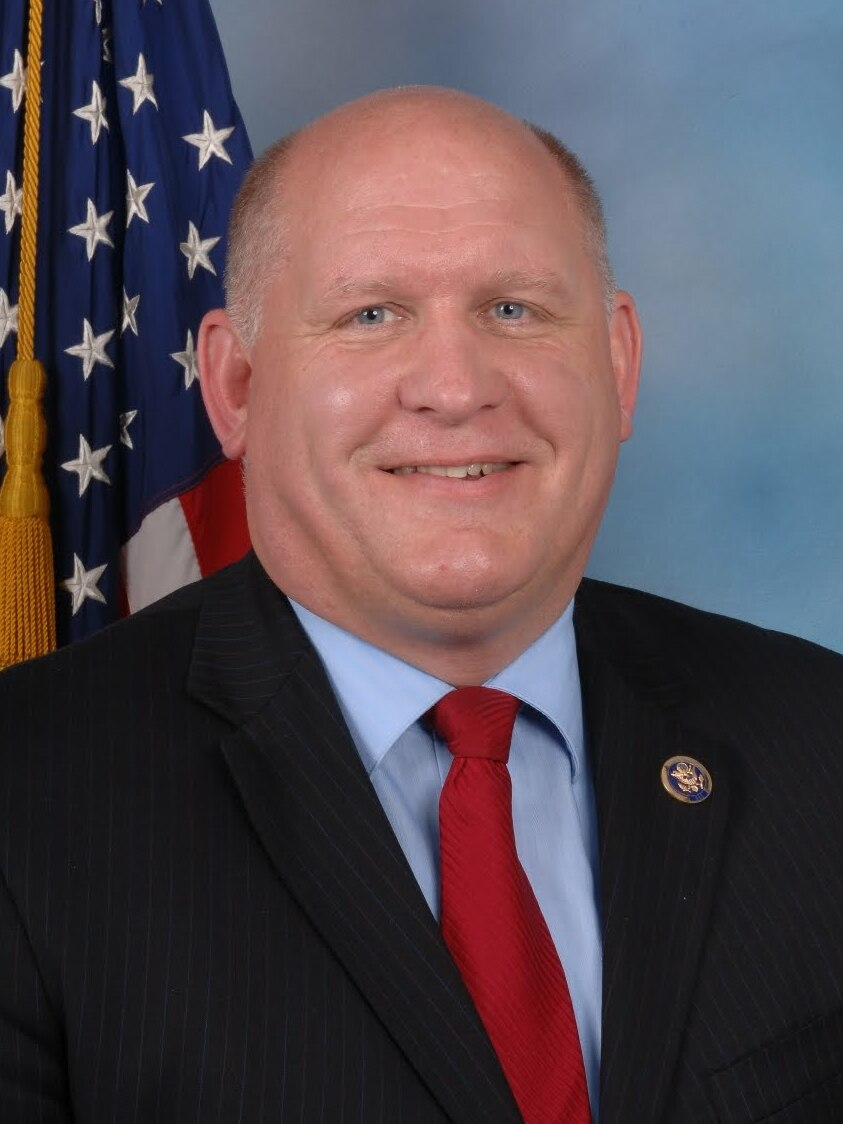

Nominee	Glenn Thompson	Kerith Strano Taylor
Party	Republican	Democratic
Popular vote	115,018	65,839
Percentage	63.6%	36.4%
- County results Thompson: 50–60% 60–70% 70–80% 80–90%
U.S. representative before election
Glenn Thompson
Republican
Elected U.S. representative
Glenn Thompson
Republican

The 5th district, the state's largest and most sparsely populated, is located in North Central Pennsylvania and includes all of Cameron, Centre, Clarion, Clinton, Elk, Forest, Huntingdon, Jefferson, McKean and Potter counties and parts of Clearfield, Crawford, Erie, Tioga, Warren and Venango counties. The incumbent was Republican Glenn Thompson, who had represented the district since 2009. He was re-elected with 63% of the vote in 2012 and the district has a PVI of R+8.

=== Republican primary ===
==== Candidates ====
===== Nominee =====
- Glenn Thompson, incumbent U.S. Representative

==== Results ====
Republican primary results
Party	Candidate	Votes	%
Republican	Glenn Thompson (incumbent)	37,564	100.0

=== Democratic primary ===
==== Candidates ====
===== Nominee =====
- Kerith Strano Taylor, family law attorney

===== Eliminated in primary =====
- Thomas Tarantella, U.S. Army veteran

===== Declined =====
- Jay Paterno, former assistant football coach at Penn State and the son of former head coach Joe Paterno (running for Lieutenant Governor)

==== Endorsements ====
Thomas Tarantella

State legislators

- Mike Hanna, state representative

Labor unions

- AFL-CIO
- International Brotherhood of Teamsters

==== Results ====
Democratic primary results
Party	Candidate	Votes	%
Democratic	Kerith Strano Taylor	18,172	53.8
Democratic	Thomas Tarantella	15,603	46.2
Total votes		33,775	100.0

=== General election ===
==== Endorsements ====
Glenn Thompson (R)

Labor unions

- National Education Association

Organizations

- Eagle Forum
- National Federation of Independent Business
- National Rifle Association - Political Victory Fund
- National Right to Life Committee
- No Labels
- United States Chamber of Commerce
Kerith Taylor (D)

Labor unions

- AFL-CIO

Organizations

- National Organization for Women
- Sierra Club

==== Predictions ====
Source	Ranking	As of
The Cook Political Report	Safe R	November 3, 2014
Rothenberg	Safe R	October 24, 2014
Sabato's Crystal Ball	Safe R	October 30, 2014
RCP	Safe R	November 2, 2014
Daily Kos Elections	Safe R	November 4, 2014

==== Results ====
Pennsylvania's 5th congressional district, 2014
Party	Candidate	Votes	%
Republican	Glenn Thompson (incumbent)	115,018	63.6
Democratic	Kerith Strano Taylor	65,839	36.4
Total votes		180,857	100.0
Republican hold			

== District 6 ==
2014 Pennsylvania's 6th congressional district election
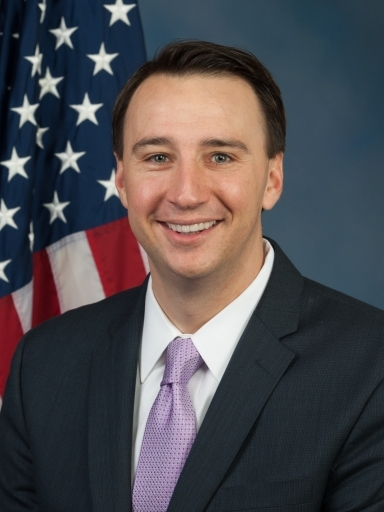

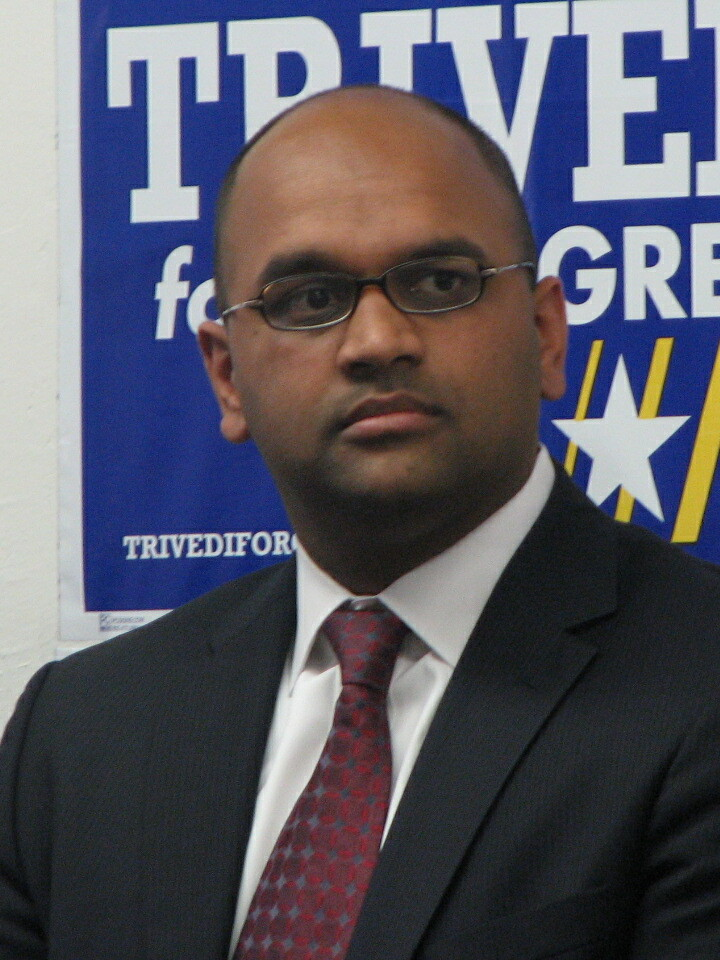
Nominee	Ryan Costello	Manan Trivedi
Party	Republican	Democratic
Popular vote	119,643	92,901
Percentage	56.3%	43.7%
- County results Costello: 50–60% 60–70%
U.S. Representative before election
Jim Gerlach
Republican
Elected U.S. Representative
Ryan Costello
Republican

The 6th district includes communities north and west of the City of Philadelphia. The incumbent was Republican Jim Gerlach, who had represented the district since 2003. He was re-elected with 57% of the vote in 2012 and the district has a PVI of R+2. Gerlach was retiring.

=== Republican primary ===
==== Candidates ====
===== Nominee =====
- Ryan Costello, chairman of the Chester County Board of Commissioners

===== Declined =====
- Patrick Collins, biotech executive
- Val DiGiorgio, chairman of the Chester County Republican Party
- Jim Gerlach, incumbent U.S. Representative
- Harry Lewis, former chair of the Brandywine Health Foundation
- John Rafferty, Jr., state senator (running for re-election)
- Sam Rohrer, former state representative, candidate for governor in 2010 and candidate for the U.S. Senate in 2012

==== Results ====
Republican primary results
Party	Candidate	Votes	%
Republican	Ryan Costello	24,313	100.0

=== Democratic primary ===
Despite landing their top recruit in businessman and West Point graduate Mike Parrish, national Democrats were left disappointed when he quit the race on 18 March, stating, "I have come to realize that an expensive and contentious Democratic primary fight would seriously risk our party's ability to win this seat in November to accomplish our goals". He had previously received criticism for only switching party affiliation to Democrat in late 2013, having been a registered Republican all his adult life.

==== Candidates ====
===== Nominee =====
- Manan Trivedi, physician and nominee for the district in 2010 and 2012

===== Withdrawn =====
- Mike Parrish, businessman and retired US Army colonel

===== Declined =====
- Chris Casey, attorney and brother of Senator Bob Casey, Jr.
- Kathi Cozzone, member of the Chester County Board of Commissioners
- Andy Dinniman, state senator
- Phil LaRue, spokesman for the New Democrat Coalition
- Daylin Leach, state senator (ran in the 13th district)
- Josh Maxwell, Mayor of Downingtown
- Katie McGinty, former Secretary of the Pennsylvania Department of Environmental Protection and former Chair of the Council on Environmental Quality (ran for governor)
- Leslie Richards, Montgomery County commissioner
- Mark Rozzi, state representative
- Judy Schwank, state senator
- Josh Young, Caln Township commissioner

==== Endorsements ====
Mike Parrish

U.S. Representatives

- Bob Brady, Representative for Pennsylvania's 1st congressional district (1998–present) and chairman of the Philadelphia Democratic Committee
- Nancy Pelosi, House Minority Leader and U.S. Representative (D-CA)

State legislators

- Mark Rozzi, state representative

Organizations

- Democratic Congressional Campaign Committee

Local officials

- Dave Burton, Mayor of Malvern
Manan Trivedi

Organizations

- Chester County Democratic Committee
- Montgomery County Democratic Committee

==== Results ====
Democratic primary results
Party	Candidate	Votes	%
Democratic	Manan Trivedi	27,359	100.0

=== General election ===
==== Endorsements ====
Ryan Costello (R)

Organizations

- Eagle Forum
- National Republican Congressional Committee "Young Guns" Program
- National Rifle Association - Political Victory Fund
- National Right to Life Committee

Newspapers

- The Philadelphia Inquirer
Manan Trivedi (D)

U.S. Representatives

- Steny Hoyer, House Minority Whip and U.S. representative from Maryland's 5th congressional district (1981–present)

Labor unions

- AFL-CIO
- National Association of Letter Carriers

Organizations

- Alliance for Retired Americans
- Chester County Democratic Committee
- Democratic Congressional Campaign Committee "Red to Blue" Program
- Human Rights Campaign
- Montgomery County Democratic Committee
- National Organization for Women
- Sierra Club

==== Polling ====
Poll source	Date(s) administered	Sample size	Margin of error	Ryan Costello (R)	Manan Trivedi (D)	Undecided
New York Times/CBS News Battleground Tracker	October 16–23, 2014	448	± 7.0%	47%	40%	13%
Lake Research Partners (D-Trivedi)	July 15–17, 2014	400	± 4.9%	35%	30%	35%
Tarrance Group (R-Costello)	May 5–7, 2014	300	± 5.8%	49%	36%	16%
Lake Research Partners (D-Trivedi)	January 27–30, 2014	350	± 5.3%	36%	34%	30%

==== Predictions ====
Source	Ranking	As of
The Cook Political Report	Likely R	November 3, 2014
Rothenberg	Safe R	October 24, 2014
Sabato's Crystal Ball	Likely R	October 30, 2014
RCP	Safe R	November 2, 2014
Daily Kos Elections	Likely R	November 4, 2014

=== General election ===
==== Results ====
Pennsylvania's 6th congressional district, 2014
Party	Candidate	Votes	%
Republican	Ryan Costello	119,643	56.3
Democratic	Manan Trivedi	92,901	43.7
Total votes		212,544	100.0
Republican hold			

== District 7 ==
2014 Pennsylvania's 7th congressional district election
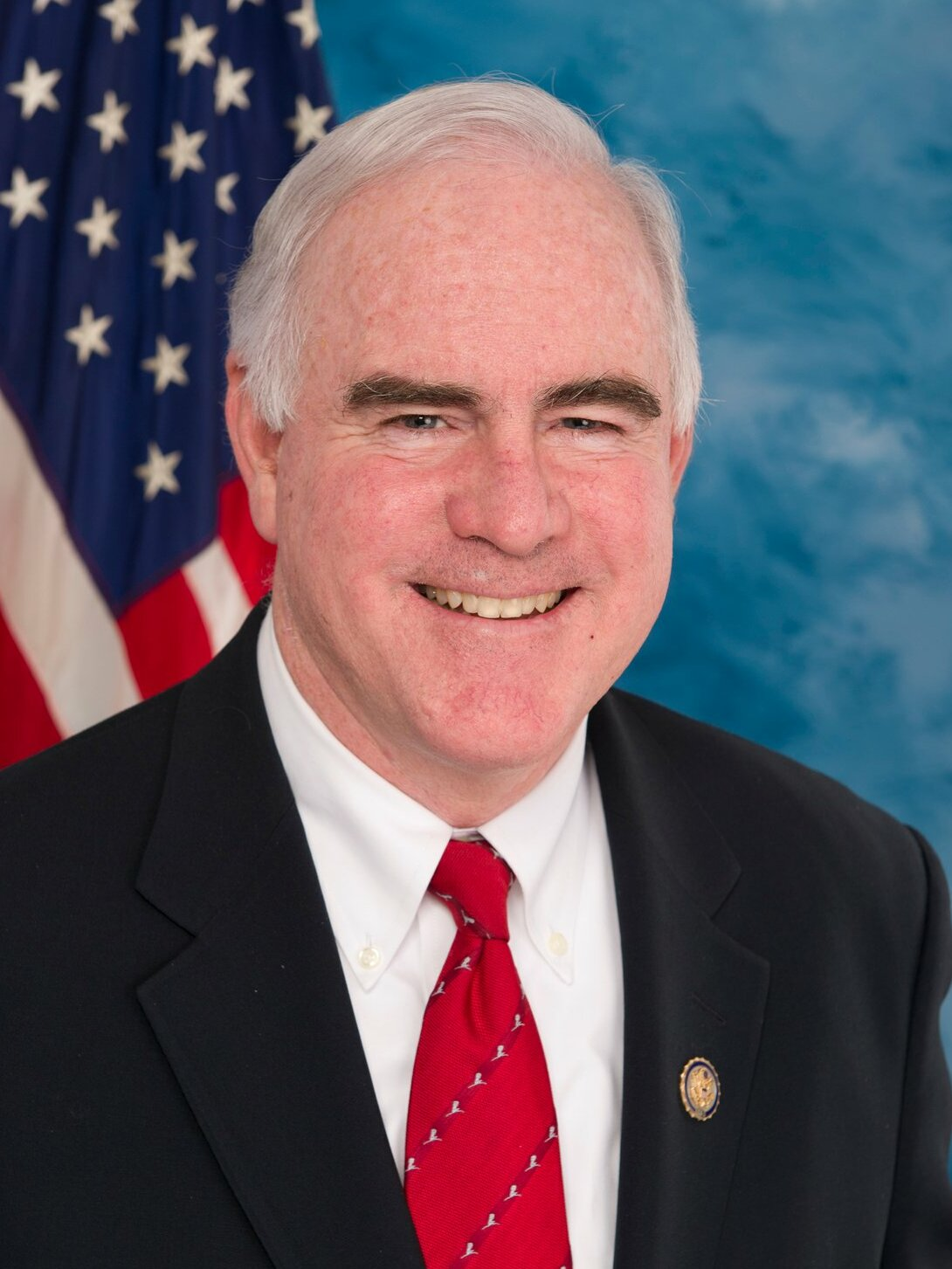

Nominee	Pat Meehan	Mary Ellen Balchunis
Party	Republican	Democratic
Popular vote	145,869	89,256
Percentage	62.0%	38.0%
- County results Meehan: 50–60% 60–70% 70–80%
U.S. Representative before election
Pat Meehan
Republican
Elected U.S. Representative
Pat Meehan
Republican

The 7th district is located in the Philadelphia suburbs, including most of Delaware County along with portions of Chester, Montgomery, Berks and Lancaster counties. The incumbent was Republican Pat Meehan, who had represented the district since 2011. He was re-elected with 59% of the vote in 2012 and the district has a PVI of R+2.

=== Republican primary ===
==== Candidates ====
===== Nominee =====
- Pat Meehan, incumbent U.S. Representative

==== Primary results ====
Republican primary results
Party	Candidate	Votes	%
Republican	Pat Meehan (incumbent)	31,020	100.0

=== Democratic primary ===
==== Candidates ====
===== Nominee =====
- Mary Ellen Balchunis, political science professor at La Salle University

==== Primary results ====
Democratic primary results
Party	Candidate	Votes	%
Democratic	Mary Ellen Balchunis	29,444	100.0

=== General election ===
==== Endorsements ====
Pat Meehan (R)

Organizations

- Eagle Forum
- Everytown for Gun Safety
- National Federation of Independent Business
- National Right to Life Committee

Newspapers

- The Philadelphia Inquirer
Mary Ellen Balchunis (D)

U.S. Representatives

- Bob Brady, Representative for Pennsylvania's 1st congressional district (1998–present) and chairman of the Philadelphia Democratic Committee
- Joe Sestak, Representative for Pennsylvania's 7th congressional district (2007–2011) and nominee for the Senate in 2010

State officials

- John Hanger, former Secretary of Environmental Protection of Pennsylvania

Organizations

- Delaware County Democratic Committee
- National Organization for Women

==== Polling ====
Poll source	Date(s) administered	Sample size	Margin of error	Pat Meehan (R)	Mary Ellen Balchunis (D)	Undecided
New York Times/CBS News Battleground Tracker	October 16–23, 2014	161	± 12.0%	56%	36%	8%

==== Predictions ====
Source	Ranking	As of
The Cook Political Report	Safe R	November 3, 2014
Rothenberg	Safe R	October 24, 2014
Sabato's Crystal Ball	Safe R	October 30, 2014
RCP	Safe R	November 2, 2014
Daily Kos Elections	Safe R	November 4, 2014

==== Results ====
Pennsylvania's 7th congressional district, 2014
Party	Candidate	Votes	%
Republican	Pat Meehan (incumbent)	145,869	62.0
Democratic	Mary Ellen Balchunis	89,256	38.0
Total votes		235,125	100.0
Republican hold			

== District 8 ==
2014 Pennsylvania's 8th congressional district election
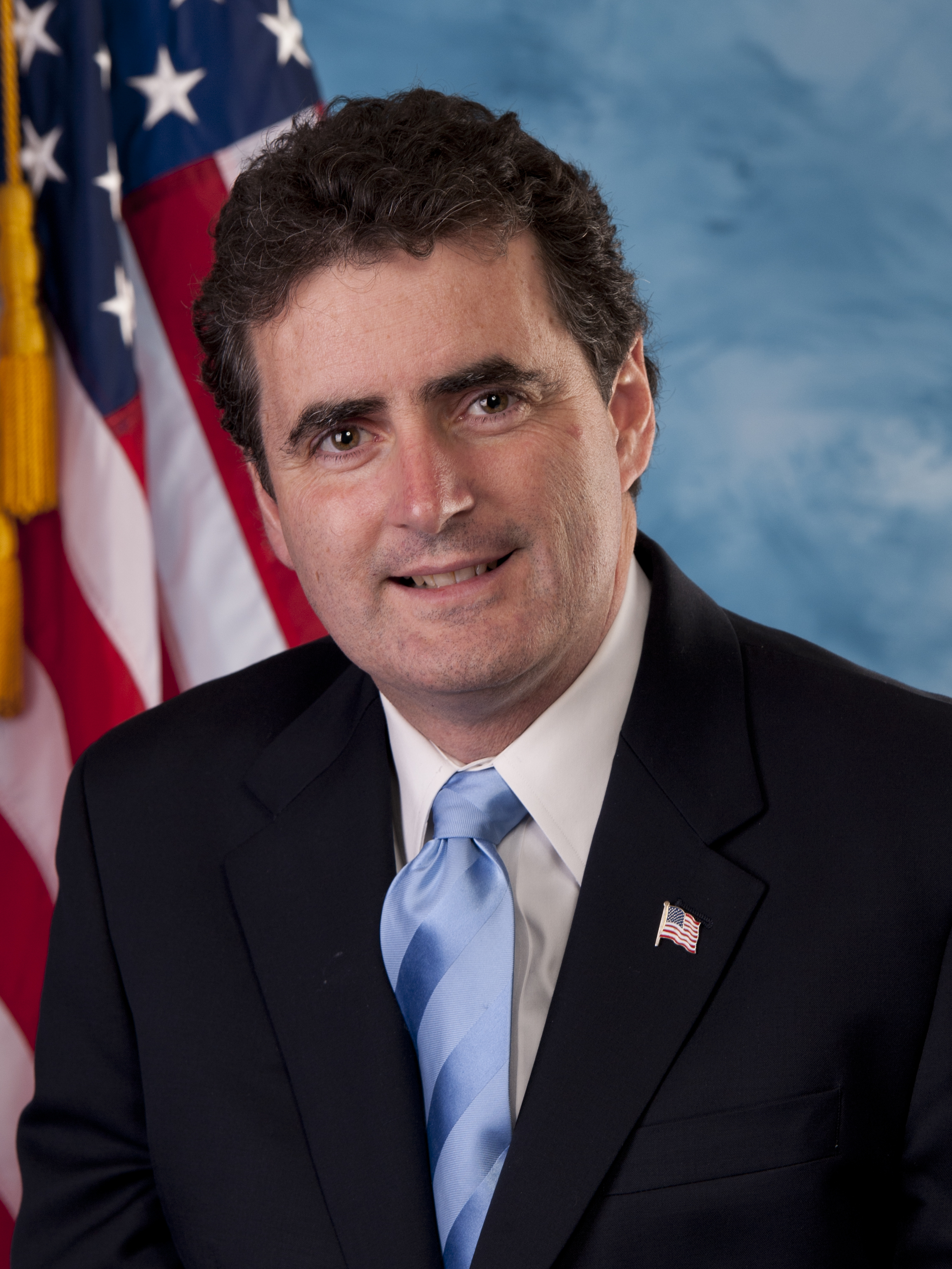

Nominee	Mike Fitzpatrick	Kevin Strouse
Party	Republican	Democratic
Popular vote	137,731	84,767
Percentage	61.9%	38.1%
- County results Fitzpatrick: 60–70%
U.S. Representative before election
Mike Fitzpatrick
Republican
Elected U.S. Representative
Mike Fitzpatrick
Republican

The 8th district is located in Southeastern Pennsylvania and includes Bucks County, along with portions of Montgomery County. The incumbent was Republican Mike Fitzpatrick, who had represented the district since 2011, and previously represented it from 2005 to 2007. He was re-elected with 57% of the vote in 2012 and the district has a PVI of R+1.

=== Republican primary ===
==== Candidates ====
===== Nominee =====
- Mike Fitzpatrick, incumbent U.S. Representative

==== Results ====
Republican primary results
Party	Candidate	Votes	%
Republican	Mike Fitzpatrick (incumbent)	22,170	100.0

=== Democratic primary ===
==== Candidates ====
===== Nominee =====
- Kevin Strouse, United States Army Ranger

===== Eliminated in primary =====
- Shaughnessy Naughton, research scientist and business owner

===== Declined =====
- Kathy Boockvar, attorney, nominee for Commonwealth Court of Pennsylvania in 2011 and nominee for this seat in 2012

==== Endorsements ====
Shaughnessy Naughton

State legislators

- Madeleine Dean, state representative

Organizations

- EMILY's List
- National Organization for Women

Individuals

- Michael E. Mann, professor at Penn State University, and climate change expert

==== Results ====
Democratic primary results
Party	Candidate	Votes	%
Democratic	Kevin Strouse	18,440	51.1
Democratic	Shaughnessy Naughton	17,623	48.9
Total votes		36,063	100.0

=== General election ===
==== Endorsements ====
Mike Fitzpatrick (R)

Labor unions

- National Association of Letter Carriers

Organizations

- Eagle Forum
- Everytown for Gun Safety
- National Federation of Independent Business
- National Right to Life Committee
- No Labels

Newspapers

- The Philadelphia Inquirer
Kevin Strouse (D)

Labor unions

- AFL-CIO

Organizations

- Alliance for Retired Americans
- Democratic Congressional Campaign Committee "Red to Blue" Program
- National Organization for Women
- VoteVets

==== Polling ====
Poll source	Date(s) administered	Sample size	Margin of error	Mike Fitzpatrick (R)	Kevin Strouse (D)	Undecided
New York Times/CBS News Battleground Tracker	October 16–23, 2014	458	± 7.0%	58%	33%	9%
American Viewpoint	August 24–26, 2014	400	± 4.9%	60%	30%	10%

==== Predictions ====
Source	Ranking	As of
The Cook Political Report	Safe R	November 3, 2014
Rothenberg	Safe R	October 24, 2014
Sabato's Crystal Ball	Safe R	October 30, 2014
RCP	Safe R	November 2, 2014
Daily Kos Elections	Safe R	November 4, 2014

==== Results ====
Pennsylvania's 8th congressional district, 2014
Party	Candidate	Votes	%
Republican	Mike Fitzpatrick (incumbent)	137,731	61.9
Democratic	Kevin Strouse	84,767	38.1
Total votes		222,498	100.0
Republican hold			

== District 9 ==
2014 Pennsylvania's 9th congressional district election
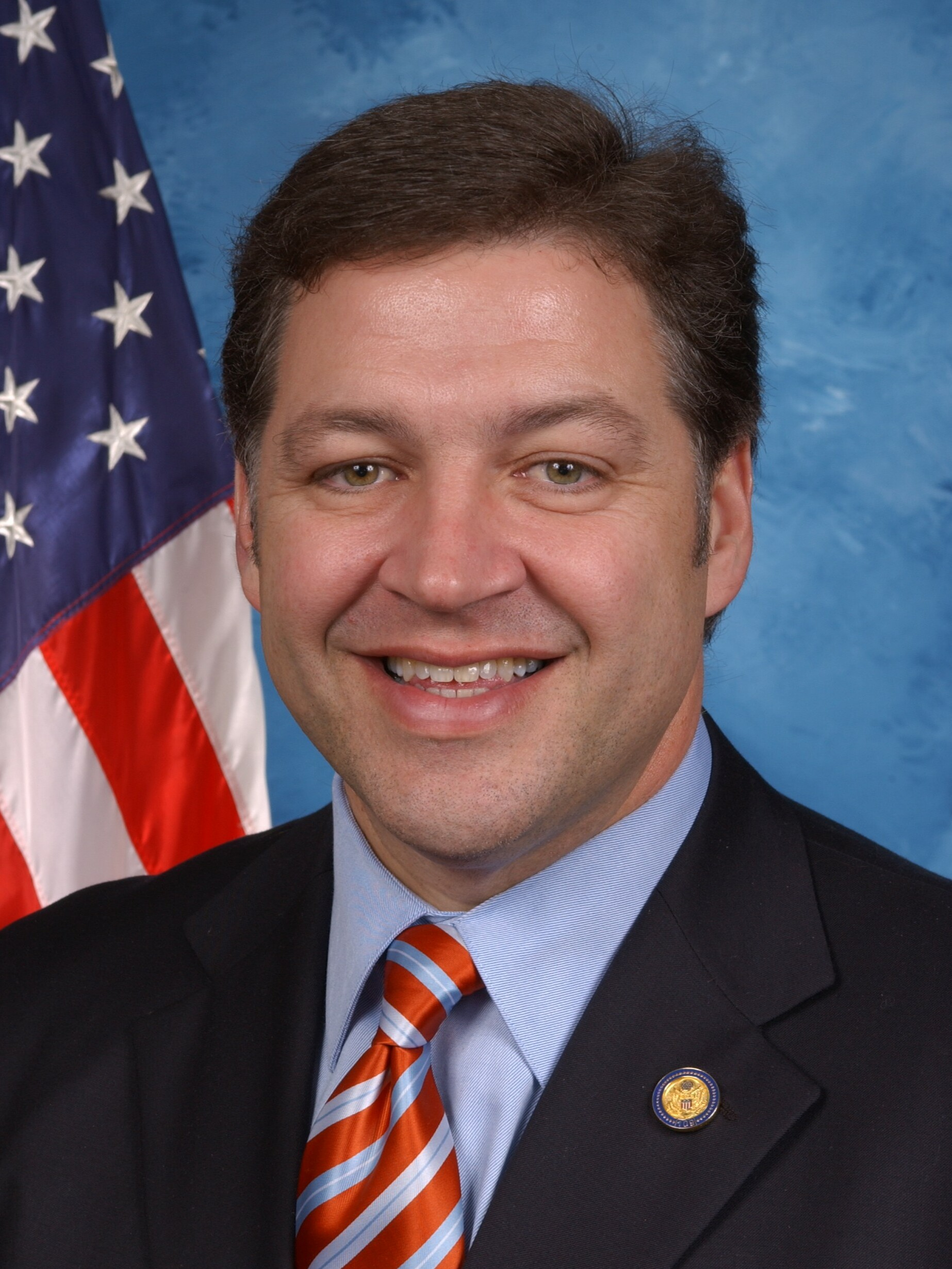

Nominee	Bill Shuster	Alanna Hartzok
Party	Republican	Democratic
Popular vote	110,094	63,223
Percentage	63.5%	36.5%
- County results Shuster: 50–60% 60–70% 70–80% 80–90% Hartzok: 50–60% 60–70%
U.S. representative before election
Bill Shuster
Republican
Elected U.S. representative
Bill Shuster
Republican

The 9th district is located in South Central Pennsylvania and includes Cambria, Blair, Huntingdon, Franklin, Fulton, Bedford, Somerset, Fayette, Greene and Washington counties. The incumbent was Republican Bill Shuster, who had represented the district since 2001. He was re-elected with 62% of the vote in 2012 and the district has a PVI of R+10.

=== Republican primary ===
Shuster, the chairman of the House Committee on Transportation and Infrastructure, anticipated a primary challenge from Republicans unhappy with his support for earmarks that bring costly projects to the district.

==== Candidates ====
===== Nominee =====
- Bill Shuster, incumbent U.S. Representative

===== Eliminated in primary =====
- Art Halvorson, businessman and Coast Guard veteran
- Travis Schooley, businessman and disqualified candidate for this seat in 2012

==== Endorsements ====
Art Halvorson

Individuals

- Erick Erickson, radio host and blogger

==== Polling ====
Poll source	Date(s) administered	Sample size	Margin of error	Bill Shuster	Art Halvorson	Travis Schooley	Undecided
Harper Polling	September 30–October 1, 2013	555	± 4%	63%	11%	5%	21%
Harper Polling	September 30–October 1, 2013	555	± 4%	60%	20%	—	20%

==== Results ====
Republican primary results
Party	Candidate	Votes	%
Republican	Bill Shuster (incumbent)	24,465	52.8
Republican	Art Halvorson	16,021	34.5
Republican	Travis Schooley	5,885	12.7
Total votes		46,371	100.0

=== Democratic primary ===
==== Candidates ====
===== Nominee =====
- Alanna Hartzok, Mental health professional, author, environmental activist and co-founder of the Earth Rights Institute

==== Results ====
Democratic primary results
Party	Candidate	Votes	%
Democratic	Alanna Hartzok	30,938	100.0

=== General election ===
==== Endorsements ====
Bill Shuster (R)

Organizations

- Eagle Forum
- National Federation of Independent Business
- National Rifle Association - Political Victory Fund
- National Right to Life Committee

Newspapers

- Pittsburgh Tribune-Review

==== Predictions ====
Source	Ranking	As of
The Cook Political Report	Safe R	November 3, 2014
Rothenberg	Safe R	October 24, 2014
Sabato's Crystal Ball	Safe R	October 30, 2014
RCP	Safe R	November 2, 2014
Daily Kos Elections	Safe R	November 4, 2014

==== Results ====
Pennsylvania's 9th congressional district, 2014
Party	Candidate	Votes	%
Republican	Bill Shuster (Incumbent)	110,094	63.5
Democratic	Alanna Hartzok	63,223	36.5
Total votes		173,317	100.0
Republican hold			

== District 10 ==
2014 Pennsylvania's 10th congressional district election
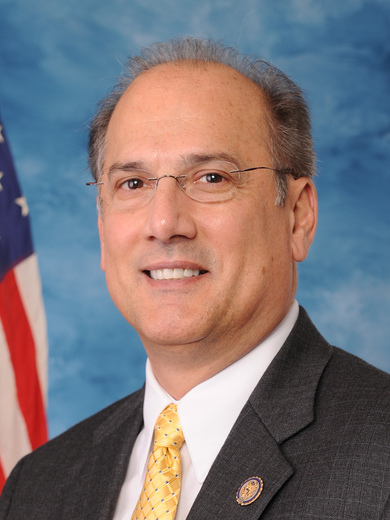

Nominee	Tom Marino	Scott Brion	Nicholas Troiano
Party	Republican	Democratic	Independent
Popular vote	112,851	44,737	22,734
Percentage	62.6%	24.8%	12.6%
- County results Marino: 40–50% 60–70% 70–80%
U.S. Representative before election
Tom Marino
Republican
Elected U.S. Representative
Tom Marino
Republican

The 10th district is located in Northeastern Pennsylvania and includes Monroe, Pike, Lackawanna, Wayne, Susquehanna, Bradford, Tioga, Sullivan, Lycoming, Union, Columbia, Snyder, Mifflin, Juniata and Perry counties. The incumbent was Republican Tom Marino, who had represented the district since 2011. He was re-elected with 66% of the vote in 2012 and the district has a PVI of R+12.

=== Republican primary ===
==== Candidates ====
===== Nominee =====
- Tom Marino, incumbent U.S. Representative

===== Declined =====
- Doug McLinko, Bradford County Commissioner

==== Primary results ====
Republican primary results
Party	Candidate	Votes	%
Republican	Tom Marino (incumbent)	32,538	100.0

=== Democratic primary ===
==== Candidates ====
===== Nominee =====
- Scott Brion, businessman and energy industry executive

===== Withdrawn =====
- Adam Rodriguez, former carpenter

==== Primary results ====
Democratic primary results
Party	Candidate	Votes	%
Democratic	Scott Brion	22,860	100.0

=== Independents ===
Nick Troiano, a James Madison Fellow with the non-profit Millennial Action Project, was run as an independent.

=== General election ===
==== Endorsements ====
Tom Marino (R)

Labor unions

- National Association of Letter Carriers

Organizations

- Eagle Forum
- National Federation of Independent Business
- National Rifle Association - Political Victory Fund
- National Right to Life Committee
Scott Brion (D)

Labor unions

- AFL-CIO

==== Polling ====
Poll source	Date(s) administered	Sample size	Margin of error	Tom Marino (R)	Scott Brion (D)	Nick Troiano (I)	Undecided
New York Times/CBS News Battleground Tracker	October 16–23, 2014	147	± 13.0%	60%	32%	–	8%
JMC Enterprises (I-Troiano)	September 18–21, 2014	492	± 4.4%	38%	26%	16%	20%
JMC Enterprises (I-Troiano)	September 18–21, 2014	492	± 4.4%	48%	34%	—	18%
JMC Enterprises (I-Troiano)	September 18–21, 2014	492	± 4.4%	38%	—	33%	29%

==== Predictions ====
Source	Ranking	As of
The Cook Political Report	Safe R	November 3, 2014
Rothenberg	Safe R	October 24, 2014
Sabato's Crystal Ball	Safe R	October 30, 2014
RCP	Safe R	November 2, 2014
Daily Kos Elections	Safe R	November 4, 2014

==== Results ====
Pennsylvania's 10th congressional district, 2014
Party	Candidate	Votes	%
Republican	Tom Marino (incumbent)	112,851	62.6
Democratic	Scott Brion	44,737	24.8
Independent	Nicholas Troiano	22,734	12.6
Total votes		180,322	100.0
Republican hold			

== District 11 ==
2014 Pennsylvania's 11th congressional district election
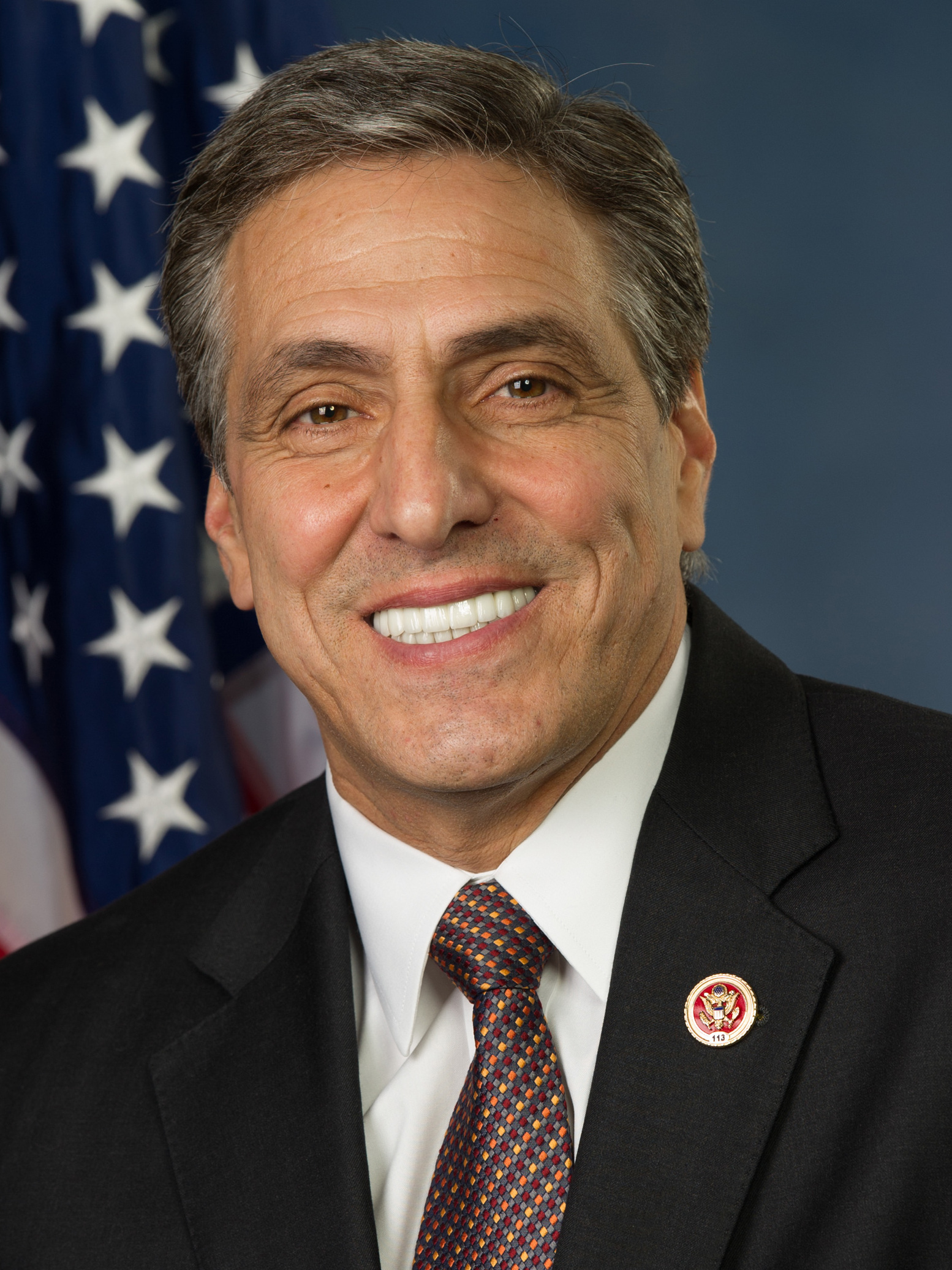

Nominee	Lou Barletta	Andrew Ostrowski
Party	Republican	Democratic
Popular vote	122,464	62,228
Percentage	66.3%	33.7%
- County results Barletta: 50–60% 60–70% 70–80%
U.S. Representative before election
Lou Barletta
Republican
Elected U.S. Representative
Lou Barletta
Republican

The 11th district is located in Northeastern Pennsylvania and includes Wyoming, Luzerne, Columbia, Carbon, Northumberland, Dauphin, Perry and Cumberland counties. The incumbent was Republican Lou Barletta, who had represented the district since 2011. He was re-elected with 59% of the vote in 2012 and the district has a PVI of R+6.

=== Republican primary ===
==== Candidates ====
===== Nominee =====
- Lou Barletta, incumbent U.S. Representative

==== Primary results ====
Republican primary results
Party	Candidate	Votes	%
Republican	Lou Barletta (incumbent)	29,772	100.0

=== Democratic primary ===
==== Candidates ====
===== Nominee =====
- Andrew Ostrowski, civil rights attorney and former Susquehanna Township attorney

===== Declined =====
- Chris Carney, former U.S. Representative
- Gene Stilp, political activist and nominee for this seat in 2012 (running for State Representative)

==== Primary results ====
Democratic primary results
Party	Candidate	Votes	%
Democratic	Andrew Ostrowski	28,567	100.0

=== General election ===
==== Endorsements ====
Lou Barletta (R)

Labor unions

- National Association of Letter Carriers

Organizations

- Eagle Forum
- National Federation of Independent Business
- National Rifle Association - Political Victory Fund
- National Right to Life Committee

Newspapers

- The Citizens' Voice
- Pittsburgh Tribune-Review
Andrew Ostrowski (D)

Labor unions

- AFL-CIO

==== Polling ====
Poll source	Date(s) administered	Sample size	Margin of error	Lou Barletta (R)	Andrew Ostrowski (D)	Undecided
New York Times/CBS News Battleground Tracker	October 16–23, 2014	139	± 13.0%	55%	36%	9%

==== Predictions ====
Source	Ranking	As of
The Cook Political Report	Safe R	November 3, 2014
Rothenberg	Safe R	October 24, 2014
Sabato's Crystal Ball	Safe R	October 30, 2014
RCP	Safe R	November 2, 2014
Daily Kos Elections	Safe R	November 4, 2014

==== Results ====
Pennsylvania's 11th congressional district, 2014
Party	Candidate	Votes	%
Republican	Lou Barletta (incumbent)	122,464	66.3
Democratic	Andrew Ostrowski	62,228	33.7
Total votes		184,692	100.0
Republican hold			

== District 12 ==
2014 Pennsylvania's 12th congressional district election
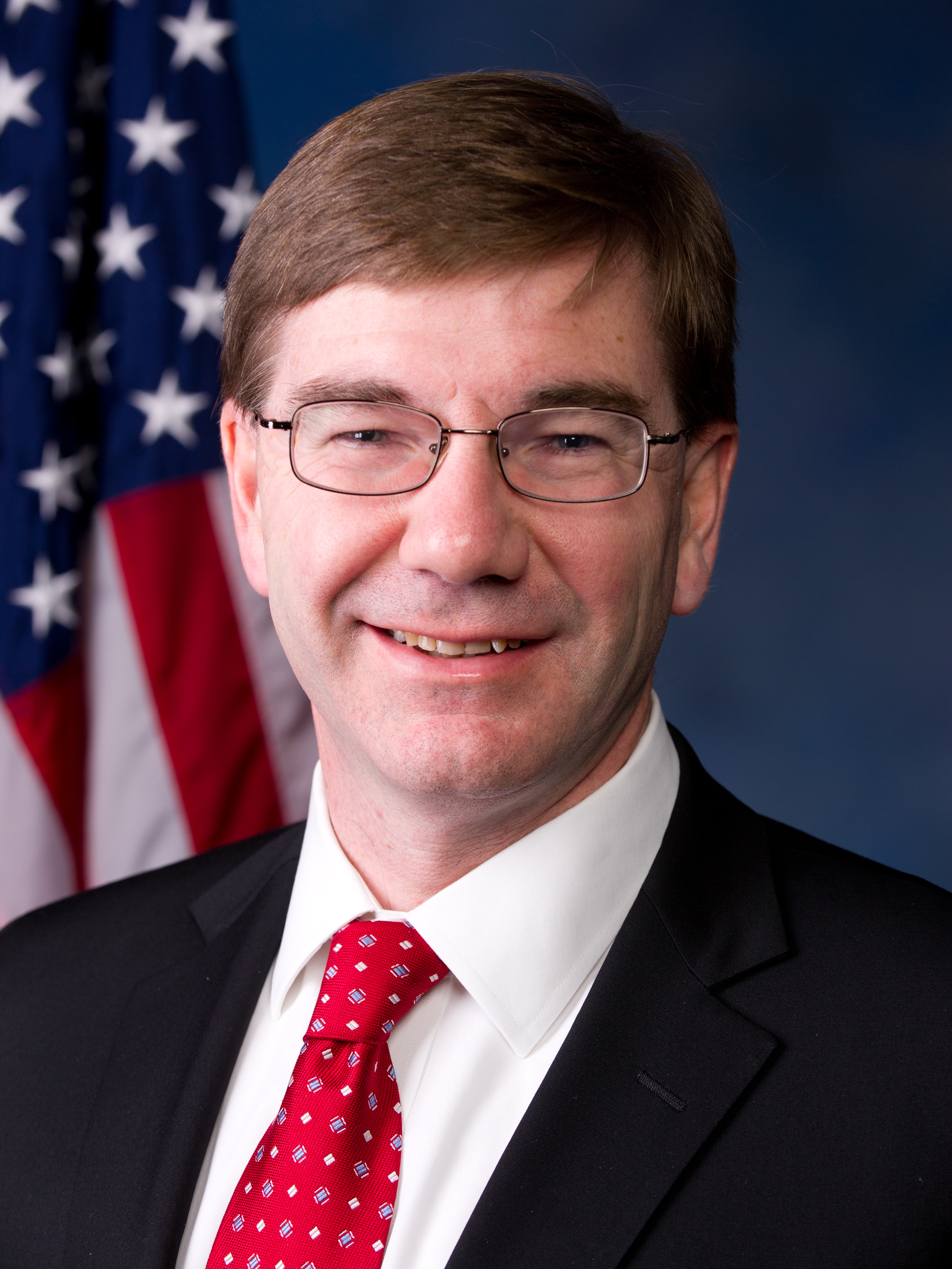

Nominee	Keith Rothfus	Erin McClelland
Party	Republican	Democratic
Popular vote	127,993	87,928
Percentage	59.3%	40.7%
- County results Rothfus: 50–60% 60–70%
U.S. Representative before election
Keith Rothfus
Republican
Elected U.S. Representative
Keith Rothfus
Republican

The 12th district is located in Southwestern Pennsylvania and includes all of Beaver County and parts of Allegheny, Cambria, Lawrence, Somerset and Westmoreland counties. The incumbent was Republican Keith Rothfus, who had represented the district since 2013. He was elected with 52% of the vote in 2012, defeating Democratic incumbent Mark Critz. The district has a PVI of R+9.

=== Republican primary ===
==== Candidates ====
===== Nominee =====
- Keith Rothfus, incumbent U.S. Representative

==== Primary results ====
Republican primary results
Party	Candidate	Votes	%
Republican	Keith Rothfus (incumbent)	23,291	100.0

=== Democratic primary ===
==== Candidates ====
===== Nominee =====
- Erin McClelland, psychologist and businesswoman

===== Eliminated in primary =====
- John Hugya, former Chief of Staff to U.S. Representative John Murtha

===== Declined =====
- Mark Critz, former U.S. Representative (running for lieutenant governor)

==== Primary results ====
Democratic primary results
Party	Candidate	Votes	%
Democratic	Erin McClelland	32,971	68.0
Democratic	John Hugya	15,547	32.0
Total votes		48,518	100.0

=== General election ===
==== Endorsements ====
Keith Rothfus (R)

Organizations

- Eagle Forum
- National Federation of Independent Business
- National Right to Life Committee
- National Rifle Association - Political Victory Fund

Newspapers

- Pittsburgh Tribune-Review
Erin McClelland (D)

Labor unions

- AFL-CIO

Organizations

- National Organization for Women

Newspapers

- Pittsburgh Post-Gazette

==== Polling ====
Poll source	Date(s) administered	Sample size	Margin of error	Keith Rothfus (R)	Erin McClelland (D)	Undecided
New York Times/CBS News Battleground Tracker	October 16–23, 2014	146	± 11.0%	58%	35%	7%

==== Predictions ====
Source	Ranking	As of
The Cook Political Report	Safe R	November 3, 2014
Rothenberg	Safe R	October 24, 2014
Sabato's Crystal Ball	Safe R	October 30, 2014
RCP	Safe R	November 2, 2014
Daily Kos Elections	Safe R	November 4, 2014

==== Results ====
Pennsylvania's 12th congressional district, 2014
Party	Candidate	Votes	%
Republican	Keith Rothfus (incumbent)	127,993	59.3
Democratic	Erin McClelland	87,928	40.7
Total votes		215,921	100.0
Republican hold			

== District 13 ==
2014 Pennsylvania's 13th congressional district election
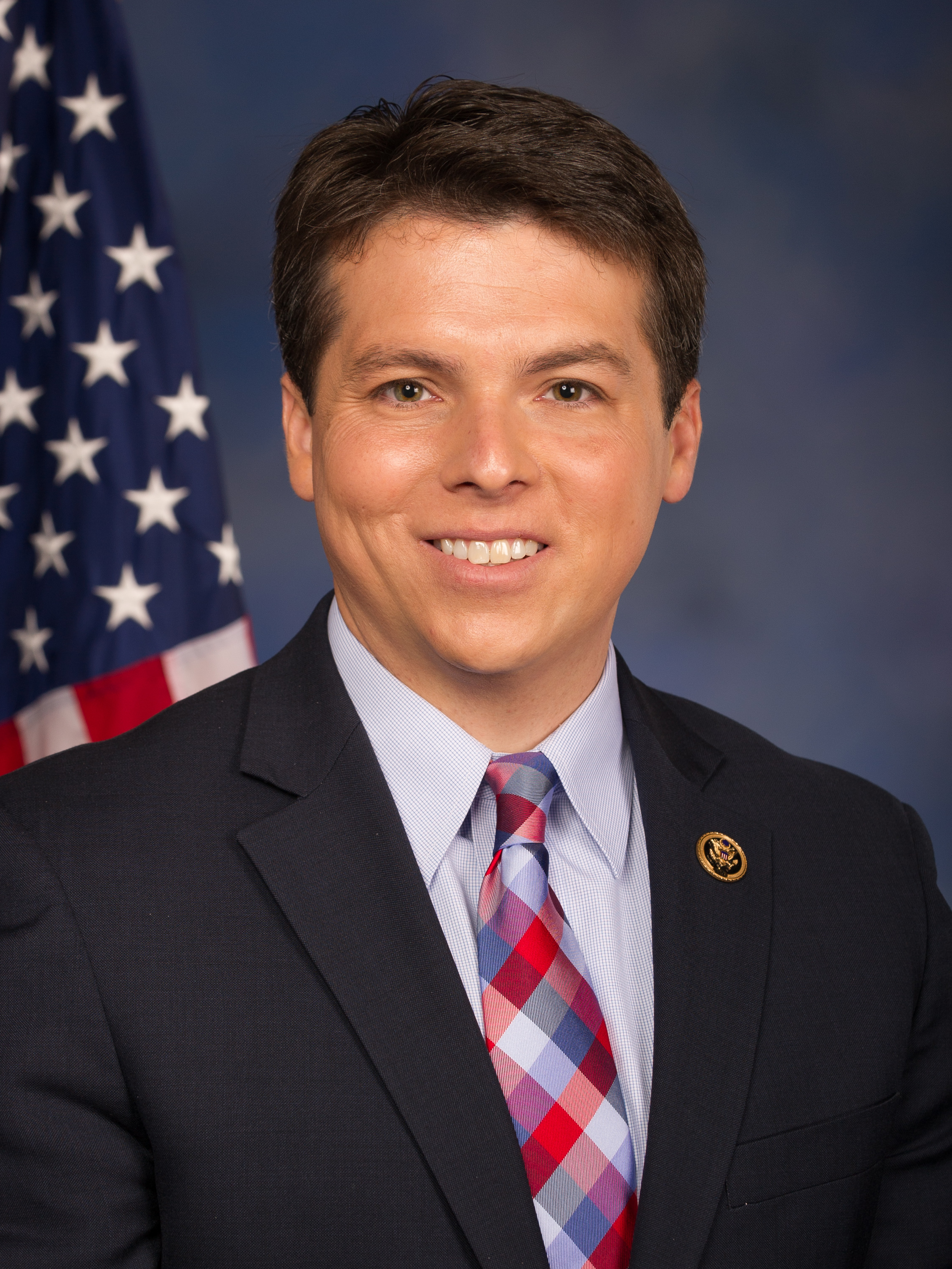

Nominee	Brendan Boyle	Carson "Dee" Adcock
Party	Democratic	Republican
Popular vote	123,601	60,549
Percentage	67.1%	32.9%
- County results Boyle: 60–70% 70–80%
U.S. Representative before election
Allyson Schwartz
Democratic
Elected U.S. Representative
Brendan Boyle
Democratic

The 13th district is located in Southeastern Pennsylvania, covering eastern Montgomery County and Northeast Philadelphia. The incumbent was Democrat Allyson Schwartz, who had represented the district since 2005. She was re-elected with 69% of the vote in 2012 and the district has a PVI of D+13.

Schwartz did not run for re-election. She instead ran for Governor of Pennsylvania.

=== Democratic primary ===
==== Candidates ====
===== Nominee =====
- Brendan F. Boyle, state representative

===== Eliminated in primary =====
- Val Arkoosh, physician and Democratic activist
- Daylin Leach, state senator
- Marjorie Margolies, former U.S. Representative

===== Withdrawn =====
- Mark B. Cohen, state representative
- Jonathan Saidel, former Philadelphia City Controller

===== Declined =====
- Bill Green, Philadelphia City Councilman
- Mark Levy, Montgomery County Prothonotary (endorsed Brendan Boyle)
- Ed Neilson, state representative
- Leslie Richards, Montgomery County commissioner (endorsed Marjorie Margolies)
- John Sabatina, state representative
- Josh Shapiro, chairman of the Montgomery County Board of Commissioners
- Jared Solomon, attorney
- Michael J. Stack III, state senator (ran for lieutenant governor)
- LeAnna Washington, state senator (endorsed Marjorie Margolies)

==== Endorsements ====
Val Arkoosh

State legislators

- Steve McCarter, state representative (R)

Organizations

- American College of Cardiology PAC
- American Congress of Obstetricians and Gynecologists PAC
- American Society of Anesthesiologists PAC
- National Committee to Preserve Social Security and Medicare
- Society of Thoracic Surgeons PAC
- Women's Campaign Fund

Newspapers

- The Philadelphia Inquirer
Brendan F. Boyle

Labor unions

- American Postal Workers Union Local 7048
- Fraternal Order of Police Lodge #5
- Fraternal Order of Police Lodge #37
- International Brotherhood of Boilermakers, Iron Ship Builders, Blacksmiths, Forgers and Helpers Local 13
- International Brotherhood of Electrical Workers Local 98
- International Union of Operating Engineers Local 115
- Transport Workers Union of America

Local officials

- Darrell L. Clarke, President of the Philadelphia City Council
Daylin Leach

U.S. Representatives

- Alan Grayson, U.S. Representative (D-FL)\
- Joe Hoeffel, former Montgomery County Commissioner and former U.S. Representative

State legislators

- Lawrence Curry, former Republican state representative
- Mary Jo Daley, state representative
- Judy Schwank, state senator
- Brian Sims, state representative

Labor unions

- Pennsylvania Association of Staff Nurses and Allied Professionals
- United Automobile Workers Region 9

Organizations

- Democracy for America
- Humane Society Legislative Fund
- MoveOn.org
- Progressive Change Campaign Committee
Marjorie Margolies

Former U.S. Executive Branch officials

- Bill Clinton, former President of the United States and father-in-law of Margolies' son Marc Mezvinsky

U.S. Representatives

- Steny Hoyer, House Minority Whip and U.S. Representative (D-MD)

State legislators

- Madeleine Dean, state representative
- Shirley Kitchen, state senator
- LeAnna Washington, state senator

Local officials

- Cindy Bass, Philadelphia City Councilwoman
- Jannie Blackwell, Philadelphia City Councilwoman
- Mike McAleer, leader of Philadelphia Ward 66B and chairman of the Northeast Ward Leaders
- Maria Quiñones-Sanchez, Philadelphia City Councilwoman
- Blondell Reynolds Brown, Philadelphia City Councilwoman
- Leslie Richards, Montgomery County commissioner
- Josh Shapiro, chairman of the Montgomery County Board of Commissioners
- Marian B. Tasco, Philadelphia City Councilwoman

==== Polling ====
Poll source	Date(s) administered	Sample size	Margin of error	Valerie Arkoosh	Brendan F. Boyle	Daylin Leach	Marjorie Margolies	Undecided
Global Strategy Group (D-Margolies)	August 13–15, 2013	422	± 4.8%	2%	15%	7%	43%	31%

==== Results ====
Democratic primary results
Party	Candidate	Votes	%
Democratic	Brendan F. Boyle	24,775	40.6
Democratic	Marjorie Margolies	16,723	27.4
Democratic	Daylin Leach	10,130	16.6
Democratic	Val Arkoosh	9,386	15.4
Total votes		61,014	100.0

=== Republican primary ===
==== Candidates ====
===== Nominee =====
- Carson "Dee" Adcock, businessman and nominee for this seat in 2010

===== Eliminated in primary =====
- Beverly Plosa-Bowser, retired U.S. Air Force Colonel

===== Withdrawn =====
- John Fritz, businessman and Northeast Philadelphia Republican Party Committeeman
- Clay McQueen, security consultant and systems specialist
- Everett Stern, businessman and whistleblower

===== Declined =====
- Marina Kats, attorney and nominee for this seat in 2008
- Joshua Quinter, attorney

==== Results ====
Republican primary results
Party	Candidate	Votes	%
Republican	Carson "Dee" Adcock	10,211	65.8
Republican	Beverly Plosa-Bowser	5,312	34.2
Total votes		15,523	100.0

=== General election ===
==== Endorsements ====
Brendan F. Boyle (D)

Labor unions

- AFL-CIO
- American Postal Workers Union Local 7048
- Fraternal Order of Police Lodge #5
- Fraternal Order of Police Lodge #37
- International Brotherhood of Boilermakers, Iron Ship Builders, Blacksmiths, Forgers and Helpers Local 13
- International Brotherhood of Electrical Workers Local 98
- International Union of Operating Engineers Local 115
- National Association of Letter Carriers
- Transport Workers Union of America

Organizations

- Everytown for Gun Safety
- Human Rights Campaign

Newspapers

- The Philadelphia Inquirer

Local officials

- Darrell L. Clarke, President of the Philadelphia City Council
Carson Adcock (R)

Organizations

- Eagle Forum
- National Federation of Independent Business

==== Predictions ====
Source	Ranking	As of
The Cook Political Report	Safe D	November 3, 2014
Rothenberg	Safe D	October 24, 2014
Sabato's Crystal Ball	Safe D	October 30, 2014
RCP	Safe D	November 2, 2014
Daily Kos Elections	Safe D	November 4, 2014

==== Results ====
Pennsylvania's 13th congressional district, 2014
Party	Candidate	Votes	%
Democratic	Brendan F. Boyle	123,601	67.1
Republican	Carson "Dee" Adcock	60,549	32.9
Total votes		184,150	100.0
Democratic hold			

== District 14 ==
2014 Pennsylvania's 14th congressional district election
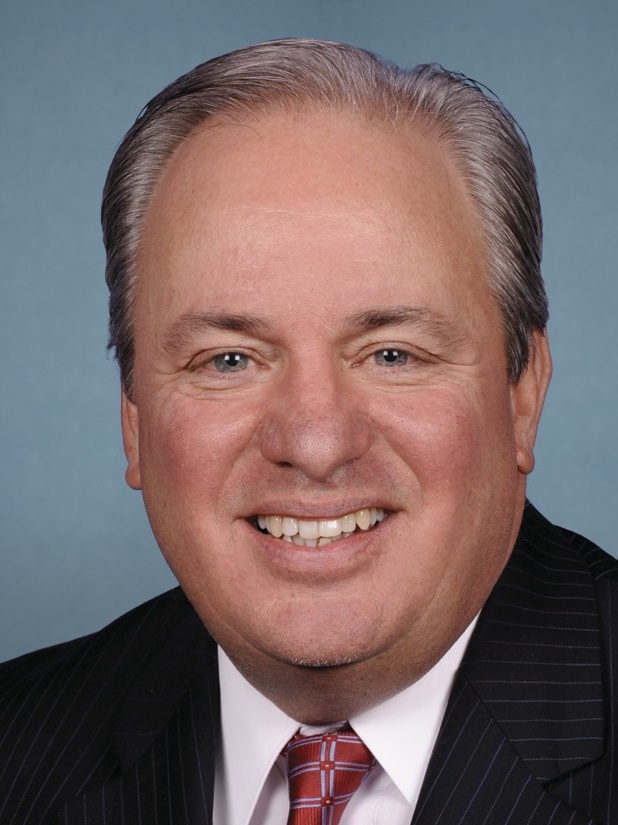
Nominee	Mike Doyle
Party	Democratic
Popular vote	148,351
Percentage	100.0%
U.S. Representative before election
Mike Doyle
Democratic
Elected U.S. Representative
Mike Doyle
Democratic

The 14th district includes the entire city of Pittsburgh and parts of surrounding suburbs. The incumbent was Democrat Michael F. Doyle, who had represented the district since 2003, and previously represented the 18th district from 1995 to 2003. He was re-elected with 77% of the vote in 2012 and the district has a PVI of D+15.

=== Democratic primary ===
==== Candidates ====
===== Nominee =====
- Michael F. Doyle, incumbent U.S. Representative

===== Eliminated in primary =====
- Janis C. Brooks, pastor, CEO/founder of Citizens to Abolish Domestic Apartheid and candidate for this seat in 2012

==== Results ====
Democratic primary results
Party	Candidate	Votes	%
Democratic	Michael F. Doyle (incumbent)	57,039	84.1
Democratic	Janis C. Brooks	10,806	15.9
Total votes		67,845	100.0

=== Republican primary ===
Ken Peoples, the chairman of the White Oak Republican Committee, had declared his candidacy for the Republican nomination, but was removed from the ballot for collecting insufficient ballot petition signatures. He subsequently ran a write-in campaign for the Republican nomination in the State House's 35th Legislative District. Bob Howard, a former candidate for Allegheny County Controller in 2011, ran a write-in campaign for the Republican nomination. Howard would need 1,000 certified write-in votes to be nominated. At least 1,498 Republican write-in votes were recorded in the district, but certifying them would take several weeks.

=== General election ===
==== Endorsements ====
Michael F. Doyle (D)

Labor unions

- AFL-CIO
- National Association of Letter Carriers

Organizations

- Human Rights Campaign

==== Predictions ====
Source	Ranking	As of
The Cook Political Report	Safe D	November 3, 2014
Rothenberg	Safe D	October 24, 2014
Sabato's Crystal Ball	Safe D	October 30, 2014
RCP	Safe D	November 2, 2014
Daily Kos Elections	Safe D	November 4, 2014

==== Results ====
Pennsylvania's 14th congressional district, 2014
Party	Candidate	Votes	%
Democratic	Michael F. Doyle (incumbent)	148,351	100.0
Total votes		148,351	100.0
Democratic hold			

== District 15 ==
2014 Pennsylvania's 15th congressional district election
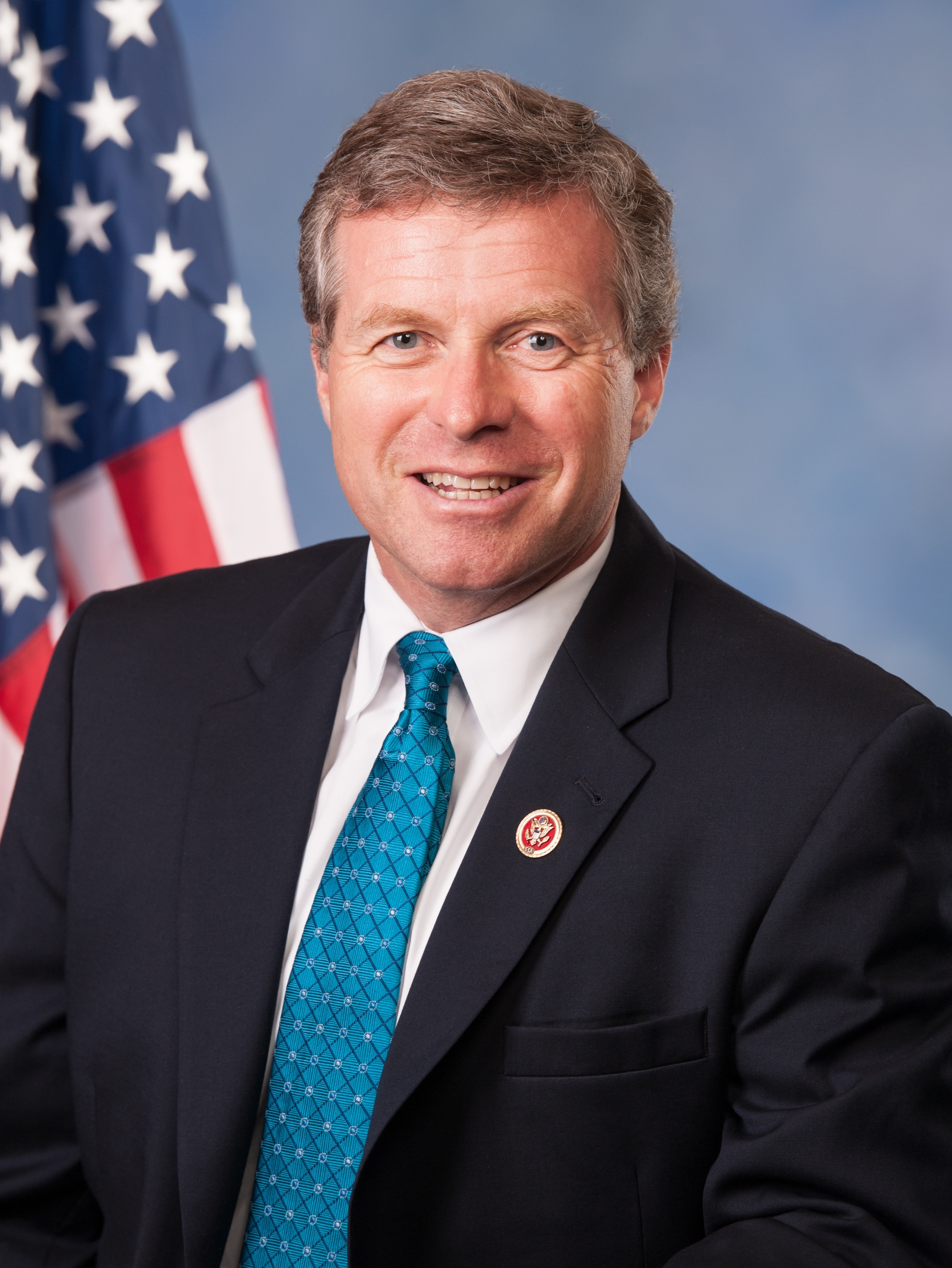
Nominee	Charlie Dent
Party	Republican
Popular vote	128,285
Percentage	100.0%
U.S. Representative before election
Charlie Dent
Republican
Elected U.S. Representative
Charlie Dent
Republican

The 15th district is located in Eastern Pennsylvania and includes Lehigh County and parts of Berks, Dauphin, Lebanon and Northampton counties. The incumbent was Republican Charlie Dent, who had represented the district since 2005. He was re-elected with 57% of the vote in 2012 and the district has a PVI of R+2.

Dent was unopposed in the Republican primary and did not face a Democratic opponent in the general election, as none filed before the deadline.

=== Republican primary ===
==== Candidates ====
===== Nominee =====
- Charlie Dent, incumbent U.S. Representative

==== Primary results ====
Republican primary results
Party	Candidate	Votes	%
Republican	Charlie Dent (incumbent)	20,700	100.0

=== Democratic primary ===
==== Candidates ====
===== Declined =====
- David A. Clarke
- Rick Daugherty, chairman of the Lehigh County Democratic Party and nominee for this seat in 2012

=== General election ===
==== Endorsements ====
Charlie Dent (R)

Organizations

- Human Rights Campaign
- National Federation of Independent Business
- National Rifle Association - Political Victory Fund
- No Labels

==== Predictions ====
Source	Ranking	As of
The Cook Political Report	Safe R	November 3, 2014
Rothenberg	Safe R	October 24, 2014
Sabato's Crystal Ball	Safe R	October 30, 2014
RCP	Safe R	November 2, 2014
Daily Kos Elections	Safe R	November 4, 2014

==== Results ====
Pennsylvania's 15th congressional district, 2014
Party	Candidate	Votes	%
Republican	Charlie Dent (incumbent)	128,285	100.0
Total votes		128,285	100.0
Republican hold			

== District 16 ==
2014 Pennsylvania's 16th congressional district election
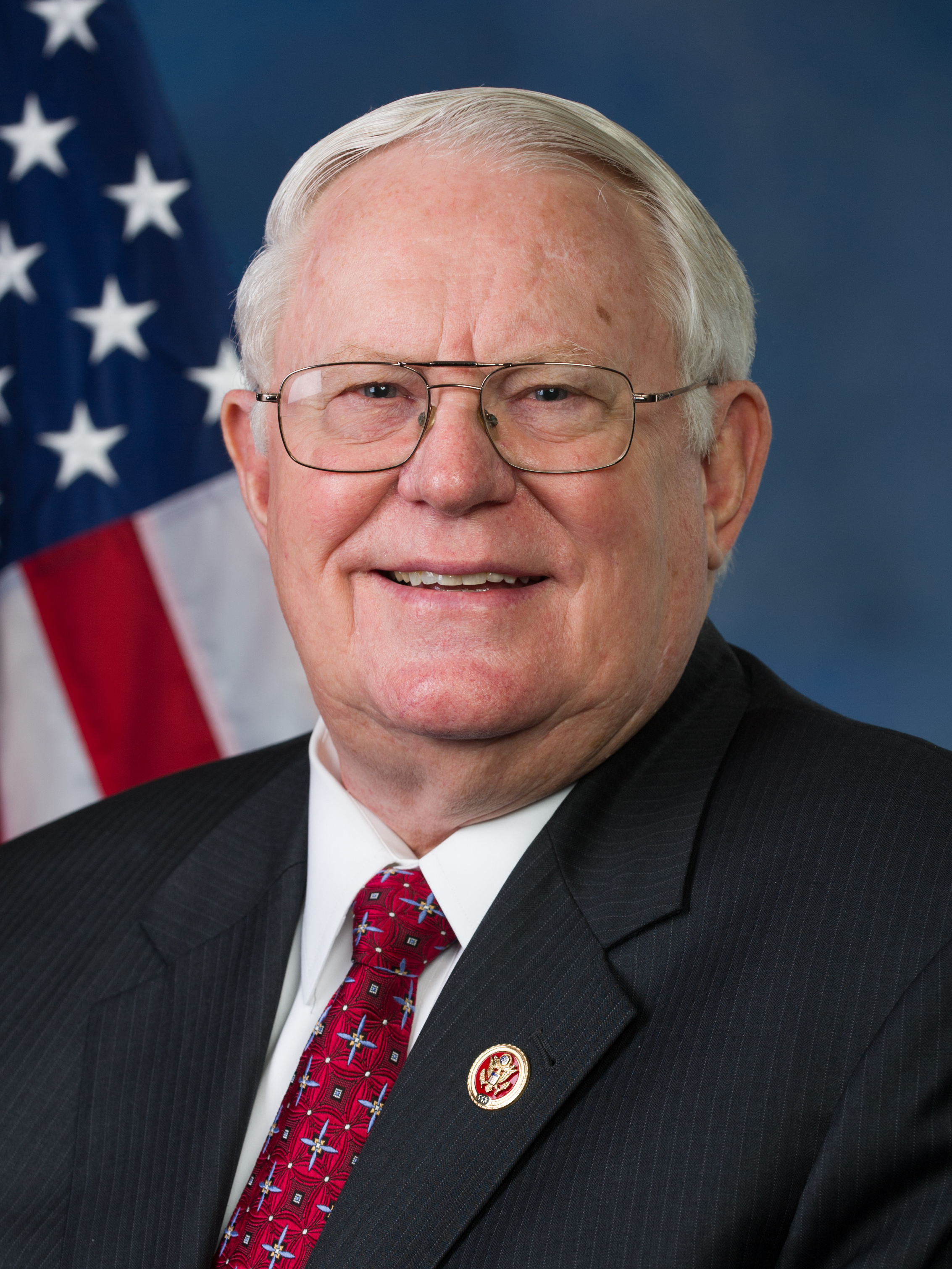

Nominee	Joe Pitts	Tom Houghton
Party	Republican	Democratic
Popular vote	101,722	74,513
Percentage	57.7%	42.3%
- County results Pitts: 50–60% 60–70% Houghton: 60–70%
U.S. Representative before election
Joe Pitts
Republican
Elected U.S. Representative
Joe Pitts
Republican

The 16th district is located in Southeastern Pennsylvania, just west of Philadelphia and includes a large portion of southern Chester County, most of Lancaster County and a sliver of Berks County, including the city of Reading. The incumbent was Republican Joe Pitts, who had represented the district since 1997. He was re-elected with 55% of the vote in 2012 and the district has a PVI of R+4.

=== Republican primary ===
==== Candidates ====
===== Nominee =====
- Joe Pitts, incumbent U.S. Representative

==== Primary results ====
Republican primary results
Party	Candidate	Votes	%
Republican	Joe Pitts (incumbent)	25,611	100.0

=== Democratic primary ===
==== Candidates ====
===== Nominee =====
- Tom Houghton, former state representative

===== Eliminated in primary =====
- Raja Kittappa, stem cell researcher

==== Primary results ====
Democratic primary results
Party	Candidate	Votes	%
Democratic	Tom Houghton	14,386	62.7
Democratic	Raja Kittappa	8,541	37.3
Total votes		22,927	100.0

=== General election ===
==== Endorsements ====
Joe Pitts (R)

Organizations

- Eagle Forum
- National Federation of Independent Business
- National Right to Life Committee
- National Rifle Association - Political Victory Fund
Tom Houghton (D)

Labor unions

- AFL-CIO

Organizations

- Sierra Club

==== Polling ====
Poll source	Date(s) administered	Sample size	Margin of error	Joe Pitts (R)	Tom Houghton (D)	Undecided
New York Times/CBS News Battleground Tracker	October 16–23, 2014	142	± 12.0%	59%	39%	2%

==== Predictions ====
Source	Ranking	As of
The Cook Political Report	Safe R	November 3, 2014
Rothenberg	Safe R	October 24, 2014
Sabato's Crystal Ball	Safe R	October 30, 2014
RCP	Safe R	November 2, 2014
Daily Kos Elections	Safe R	November 4, 2014

==== Results ====
Pennsylvania's 16th congressional district, 2014
Party	Candidate	Votes	%
Republican	Joe Pitts (incumbent)	101,722	57.7
Democratic	Tom Houghton	74,513	42.3
Total votes		176,235	100.0
Republican hold			

== District 17 ==
2014 Pennsylvania's 17th congressional district election
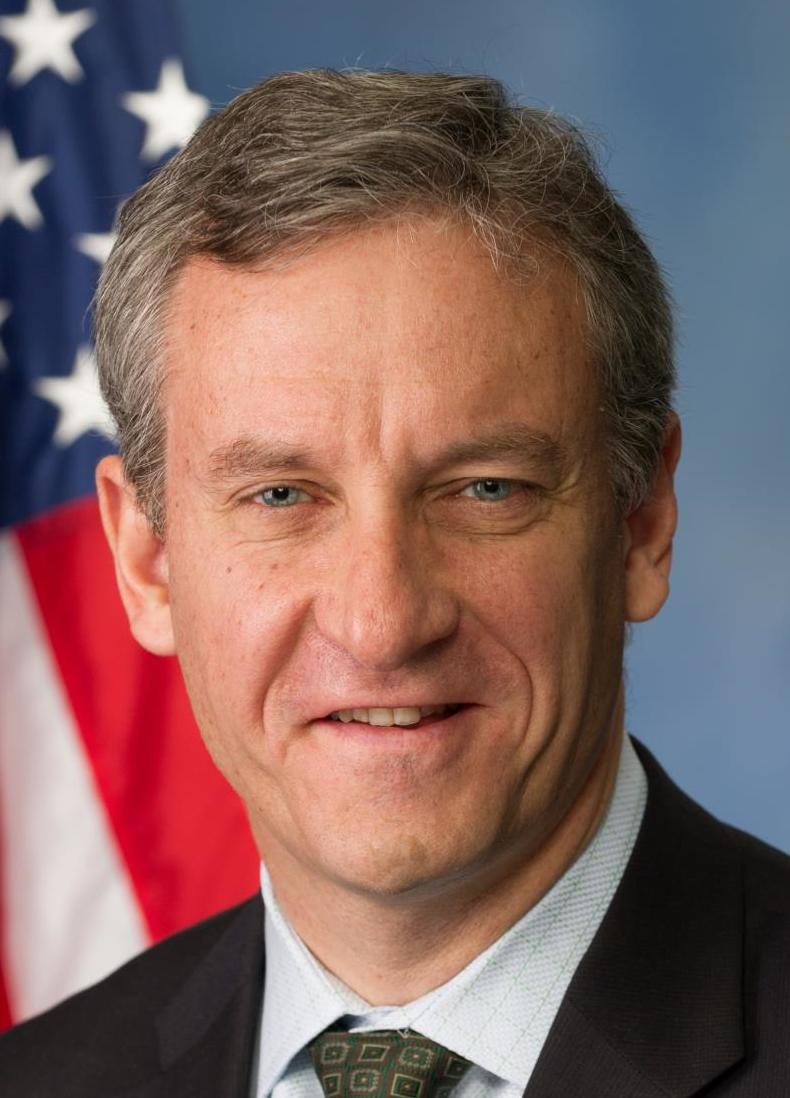

Nominee	Matt Cartwright	David Moylan
Party	Democratic	Republican
Popular vote	93,680	71,371
Percentage	56.8%	43.2%
- County results Cartwright: 50–60% 60–70% 70–80% Moylan: 50–60% 60–70%
U.S. Representative before election
Matt Cartwright
Democratic
Elected U.S. Representative
Matt Cartwright
Democratic

The 17th district is located in Eastern Pennsylvania and includes Schuylkill, Carbon, Monroe, Luzerne and Lackawanna counties. The incumbent was Democrat Matt Cartwright, who had represented the district since 2013. He was elected in 2012, defeating incumbent Democrat Tim Holden in the primary with 57% of the vote and winning the general election with 60% of the vote. The district has a PVI of D+4.

=== Democratic primary ===
==== Candidates ====
===== Nominee =====
- Matt Cartwright, incumbent U.S. Representative

==== Results ====
Democratic primary results
Party	Candidate	Votes	%
Democratic	Matt Cartwright (incumbent)	47,992	100.0

=== Republican primary ===
==== Candidates ====
===== Nominee =====
- David Moylan, Schuylkill County coroner

===== Eliminated in primary =====
- Matt Connolly, sports car racing team owner
- Matthew Dietz, charter pilot

==== Results ====
Republican primary results
Party	Candidate	Votes	%
Republican	David Moylan	9,227	44.6
Republican	Matt Connolly	7,000	33.8
Republican	Matthew Dietz	4,465	21.6
Total votes		20,692	100.0

=== General election ===
==== Endorsements ====
Matt Cartwright (D)

Labor unions

- AFL-CIO
- National Association of Letter Carriers

Organizations

- Alliance for Retired Americans
- Human Rights Campaign
- Sierra Club

Newspapers

- The Citizens' Voice
- The Express-Times
David Moylan (R)

Organizations

- Eagle Forum

==== Polling ====
Poll source	Date(s) administered	Sample size	Margin of error	Matt Cartwright (D)	David Moylan (R)	Undecided
New York Times/CBS News Battleground Tracker	October 16–23, 2014	142	± 13.0%	51%	39%	10%

==== Predictions ====
Source	Ranking	As of
The Cook Political Report	Safe D	November 3, 2014
Rothenberg	Safe D	October 24, 2014
Sabato's Crystal Ball	Safe D	October 30, 2014
RCP	Safe D	November 2, 2014
Daily Kos Elections	Safe D	November 4, 2014

==== Results ====
Pennsylvania's 17th congressional district, 2014
Party	Candidate	Votes	%
Democratic	Matt Cartwright (incumbent)	93,680	56.8
Republican	David Moylan	71,371	43.2
Total votes		165,051	100.0
Democratic hold			

== District 18 ==
2014 Pennsylvania's 18th congressional district election
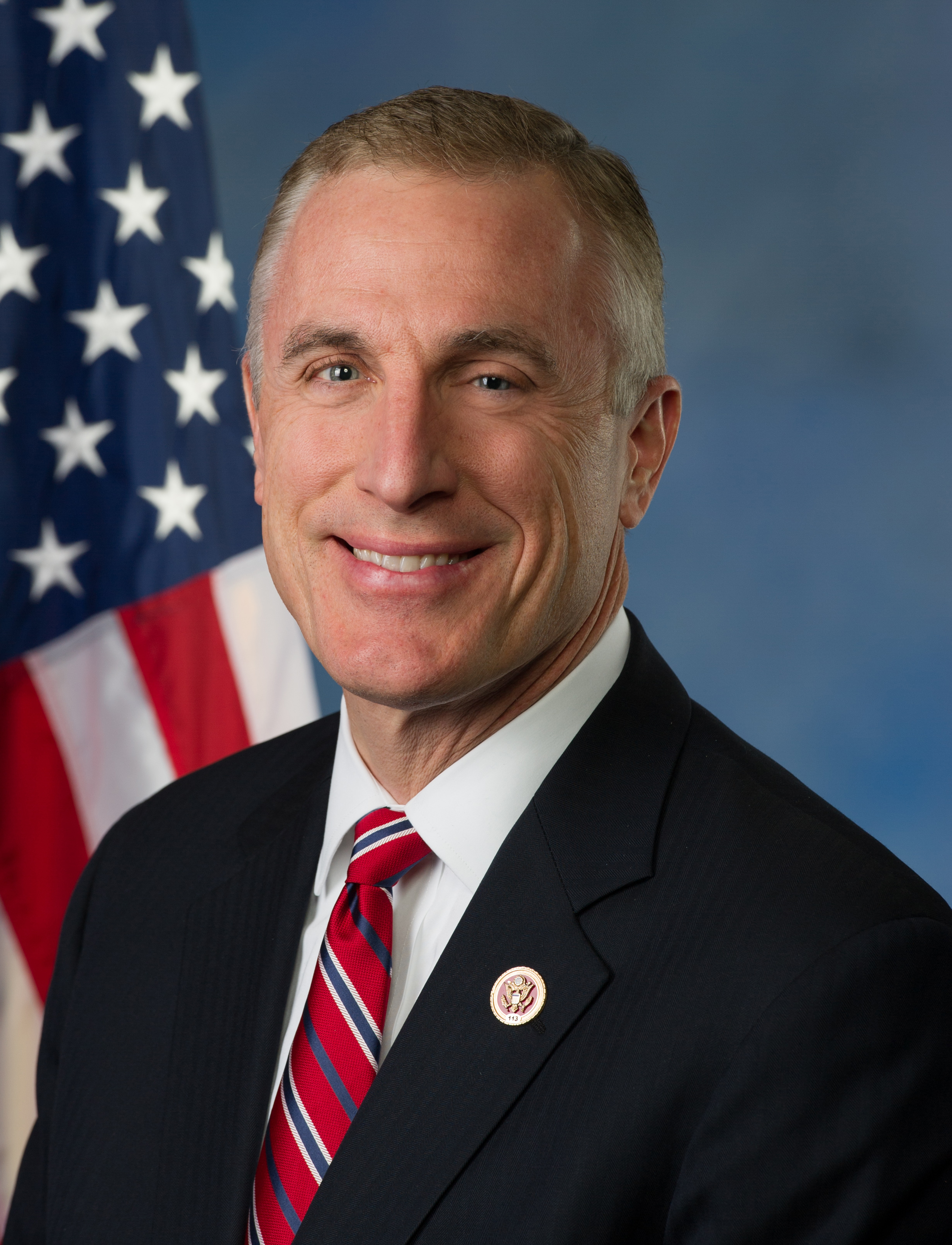
Nominee	Tim Murphy
Party	Republican
Popular vote	166,076
Percentage	100.0%
U.S. Representative before election
Tim Murphy
Republican
Elected U.S. Representative
Tim Murphy
Republican

The 18th district is located in the southern suburbs of Pittsburgh and includes parts of Allegheny, Washington, Beaver and Westmoreland counties. The incumbent was Republican Timothy F. Murphy, who had represented the district since 2003. He was re-elected with 64% of the vote in 2012 and the district has a PVI of R+10.

=== Republican primary ===
==== Candidates ====
===== Nominee =====
- Tim Murphy, incumbent U.S. Representative

==== Primary results ====
Republican primary results
Party	Candidate	Votes	%
Republican	Timothy F. Murphy (incumbent)	19,575	100.0

=== Democratic primary ===
Murphy did not face a Democratic opponent in the general election as none filed before the deadline.

=== General election ===
==== Endorsements ====
Tim Murphy (R)

Labor unions

- National Association of Letter Carriers

Organizations

- Eagle Forum
- National Federation of Independent Business
- National Right to Life Committee
- National Rifle Association - Political Victory Fund

==== Predictions ====
Source	Ranking	As of
The Cook Political Report	Safe R	November 3, 2014
Rothenberg	Safe R	October 24, 2014
Sabato's Crystal Ball	Safe R	October 30, 2014
RCP	Safe R	November 2, 2014
Daily Kos Elections	Safe R	November 4, 2014

==== Results ====
Pennsylvania's 18th congressional district, 2014
Party	Candidate	Votes	%
Republican	Tim Murphy (incumbent)	166,076	100.0
Total votes		166,076	100.0
Republican hold			

== See also ==
- 2014 United States House of Representatives elections
- 2014 United States elections
