= Senator Stack =

Senator Stack may refer to:

- Brian P. Stack (born 1966), New Jersey State Senate
- Mike Stack (born 1963), Pennsylvania State Senate
