= Jim Cawley =

American politician (born 1969)

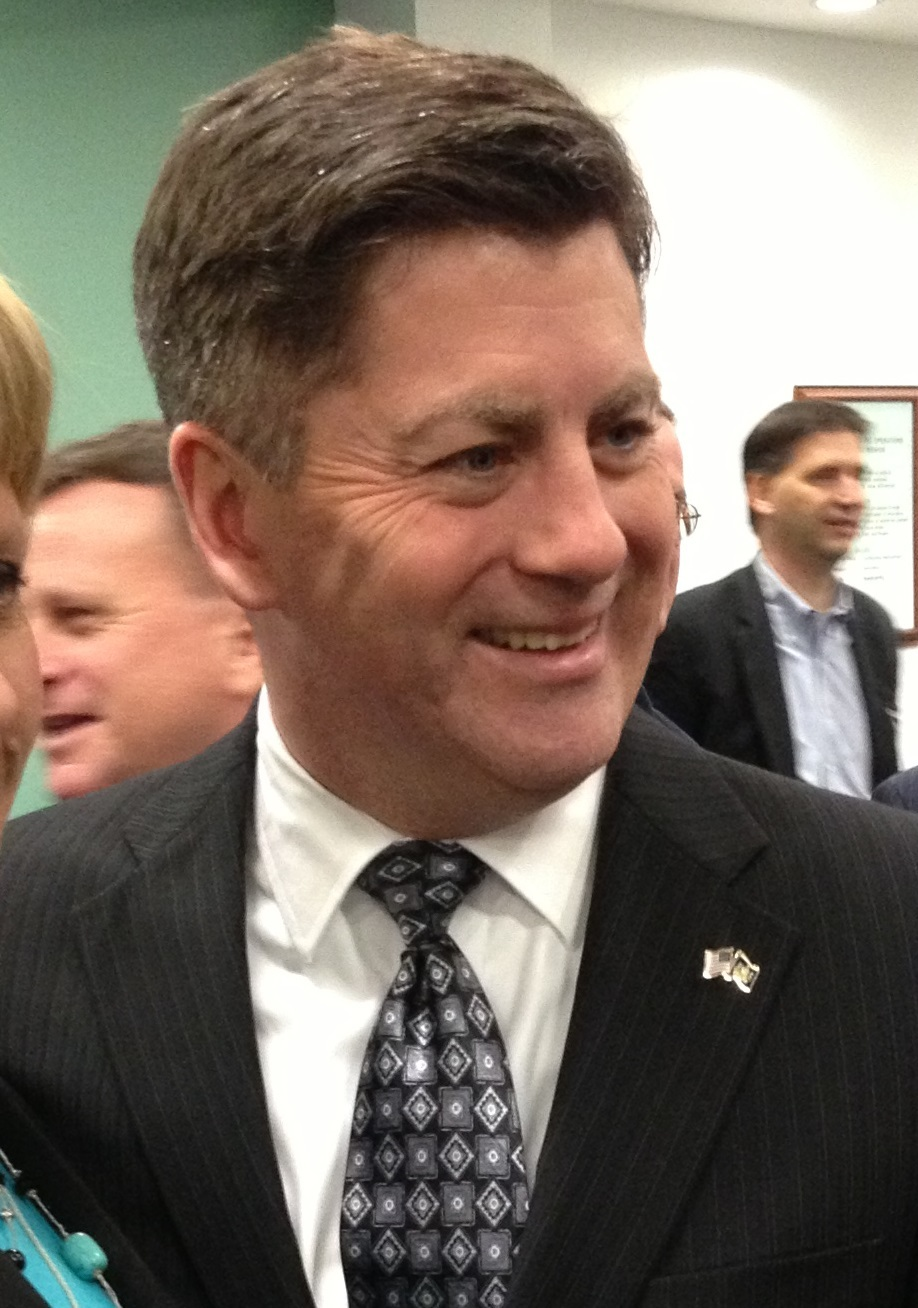

32nd Lieutenant Governor of Pennsylvania
- In office January 18, 2011 – January 20, 2015
- Governor: Tom Corbett
- Preceded by: Joe Scarnati
- Succeeded by: Mike Stack

Member of the Bucks County Board of Commissioners
- In office January 4, 2005 – January 18, 2011
- Preceded by: Mike Fitzpatrick
- Succeeded by: Robert G. Loughery

Personal details
- Born: June 22, 1969 (age 57) Bristol, Pennsylvania, U.S.
- Party: Republican
- Spouse: Suzanne Cawley
- Children: 1
- Education: Temple University (BA, JD)

James Cawley (born June 22, 1969) is an American politician and administrator who has served as president of Rosemont College since 2022.

Cawley previously served as Lieutenant Governor of Pennsylvania from 2011 to 2015. As of 2026, he is the most recent Republican to hold the office. (Note: Kim Ward served as acting Lt. Governor from January 3–17, 2023 when John Fetterman resigned to become United States Senator.) He has also served on the Board of Commissioners for Bucks County, Pennsylvania.

== Early life, education, and early political career ==
He graduated from Bishop Egan High School in Bristol Township, Bucks County, Pennsylvania. He then graduated cum laude from Temple University with a Bachelor of Arts in Political Science. He received a J.D. degree from Temple University School of Law.

== Career ==
Prior to being elected to the Bucks County Board of Commissioners, he was chief of staff to State Senator Tommy Tomlinson. In 2000, he ran for a seat in the Pennsylvania House of Representatives in the 141st District. Incumbent Democratic State Representative Anthony Melio won re-election by defeating Cawley 56%–42%. He was also a former Pennsylvania state chairman and national co-chairman of the College Republicans and served as an elected member of the Bristol Township School Board.

He served on the County Commissioner's Association of Pennsylvania's Energy, Environment, & Land Use Committee as chairman. Jim is a former member of the board of directors for Lower Bucks Hospital, a former trustee of Bucks County Community College and a Commonwealth trustee of Temple University.

=== Bucks County Commission ===
He was appointed to the Bucks County Board of Commissioners following the resignation of Mike Fitzpatrick (who had been elected to Congress).

In 2007, he won re-election with 26% of the vote.

He became chairman of the board after he was re-elected. According to self-supplied biographical information, he helped expand the Bucks County Community College, kept taxes low for four consecutive years, and helped increase the county's bond rating to its highest level ever.

=== Lieutenant governor ===
In 2010, he ran for the state lieutenant governor and won the Republican primary in a crowded nine candidate field with just 26% of the vote. He only won 14 out of the state's 67 counties. He only won three counties with a majority: Bucks (70%), Montgomery (51%), and Delaware (56%) counties. He was on the ticket with Republican gubernatorial nominee Tom Corbett, the state's Attorney General. He defeated Democratic lieutenant gubernatorial nominee Scott Conklin, a state representative, 54%–46%. He took office on January 18, 2011.

Cawley briefly served as acting governor on February 27, 2014, while Governor Tom Corbett was anesthetized during surgery. The Pennsylvania Constitution states that when the governor is incapacitated, the lieutenant governor shall serve as acting governor until the disability is removed. Corbett awoke after surgery and was cleared to resume power approximately 85 minutes after going under. Cawley was the third lieutenant governor in Pennsylvania history to assume power as acting governor.

Cawley was unopposed in the Republican primary for lieutenant governor in May 2014. He was Governor Corbett's running mate again in the general election on November 4, 2014, in which the Republican ticket was defeated by the Democrats Tom Wolf and Mike Stack.

Cawley was named a 2014 Aspen Institute Rodel Fellow.

=== Later career ===
On February 9, 2015, Cawley became the new president and CEO of the United Way of Greater Philadelphia and Southern New Jersey.

On August 13, 2017, Temple announced the appointment of Cawley as a vice president of institutional advancement.

On June 3, 2022, the board of trustees of Rosemont College in Rosemont, Pennsylvania, announced the appointment of Cawley as interim president of the college.

On October 28, 2022, the board of trustees of Rosemont College announced the appointment of Cawley as president of the college. On March 31, 2025, Rosemont College announced that it was merging with Villanova University in 2028 under Cawley's leadership.

== Personal life ==
Cawley, lives in Langhorne Manor Borough, Bucks County, Pennsylvania, with his wife and son.

== See also ==
- Pennsylvania gubernatorial election, 2018
- Pennsylvania gubernatorial election, 2014
- Pennsylvania lieutenant gubernatorial election, 2014

== Notes ==
Political offices
| Preceded by Joe Scarnati | Lieutenant Governor of Pennsylvania; 2011–2015 | Succeeded by Mike Stack |
| Preceded by Mike Fitzpatrick | Member of the Bucks County Board of Commissioners; 2005–2011 | Succeeded by Robert G. Loughery |
Party political offices
| Preceded by Jim Matthews | Republican nominee for Lieutenant Governor of Pennsylvania; 2010, 2014 | Succeeded by Jeff Bartos |
