= Ryan Costello =

American politician (born 1976)

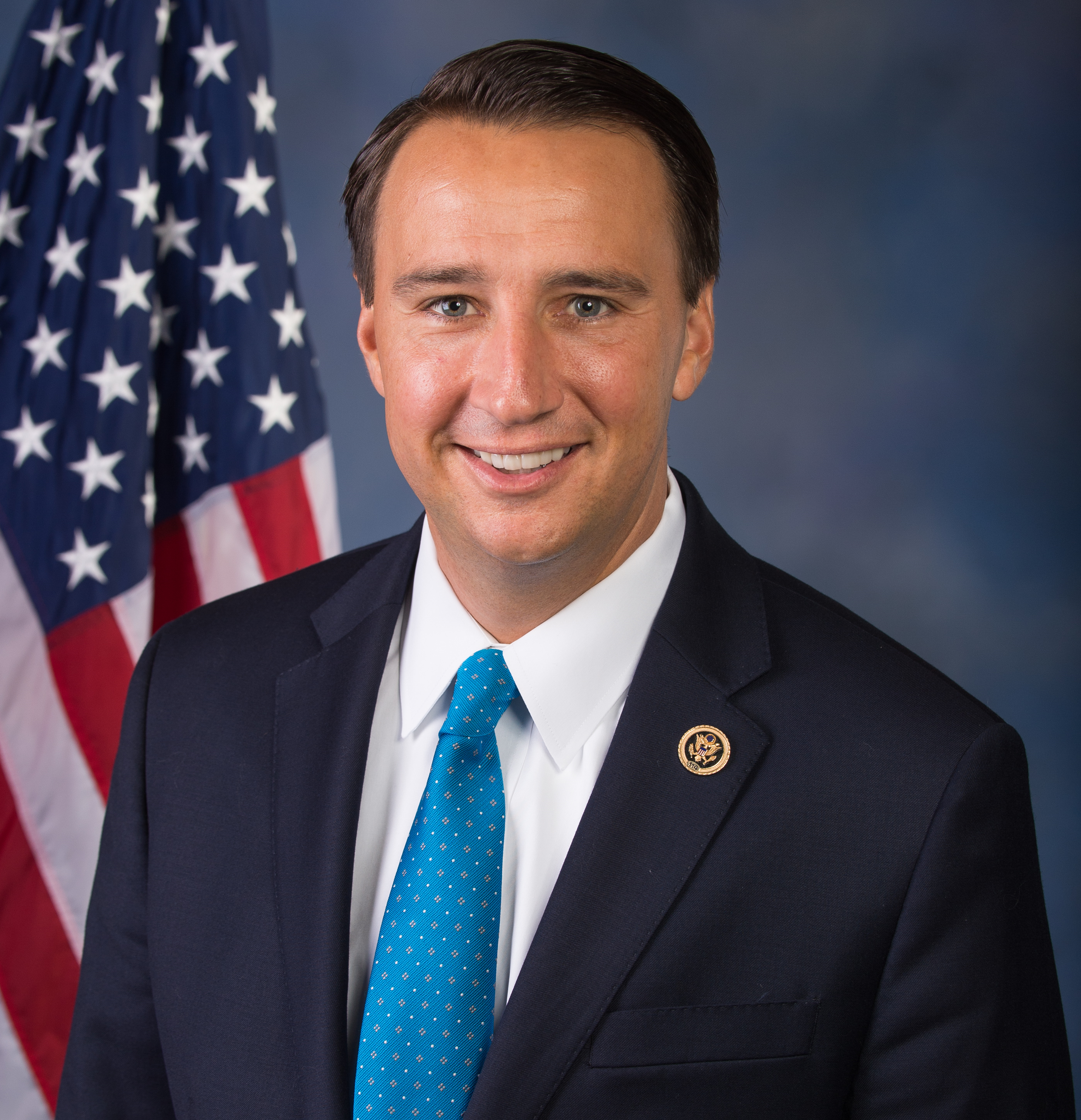

Member of the U.S. House of Representatives from Pennsylvania's 6th district
- In office January 3, 2015 – January 3, 2019
- Preceded by: Jim Gerlach
- Succeeded by: Chrissy Houlahan

Member of the Chester County Board of Commissioners
- In office February 17, 2011 – December 16, 2014; Chair: 2013–2014, 2014
- Preceded by: Carol Aichele
- Succeeded by: Michelle Kichline

Recorder of Deeds of Chester County
- In office January 7, 2008 – February 17, 2011
- Preceded by: Terence Farrell
- Succeeded by: Rick Loughery

Personal details
- Born: Ryan Anthony Costello; September 7, 1976 (age 49) Phoenixville, Pennsylvania, U.S.
- Party: Republican
- Spouse: Christine Costello
- Children: 2
- Education: Ursinus College (BA); Villanova University (JD)

Ryan Anthony Costello (born September 7, 1976) is an American politician, lobbyist, and attorney who served as the U.S. representative for Pennsylvania's 6th congressional district from 2015 to 2019. A member of the Republican Party, he was first elected to the Congress in the 2014 midterms. Costello previously served on the Chester County Board of Commissioners (2011–2015), which he chaired from 2013 to 2015.

Costello chose not to seek reelection in the 2018 election, and was succeeded by Democrat Chrissy Houlahan. After leaving Congress, Costello became a registered lobbyist.

== Early life ==
Costello was born in 1976 to schoolteacher parents. Costello attended Ursinus College and Villanova University School of Law.

== Political career ==
Costello served on the Board of Supervisors for East Vincent Township in Chester County, Pennsylvania, for six years, serving as chairman for the last four. He was elected the Chester County recorder of deeds in 2008. He was elected to the Chester County Board of Commissioners in 2011. His fellow commissioners elected him as chairman of the commission in 2013, and reappointed in 2014.

== U.S. House of Representatives ==
=== Elections ===
2014

When Jim Gerlach, the Republican incumbent in Pennsylvania's 6th congressional district in the United States House of Representatives, announced that he would not run for reelection in 2014, Costello chose to run for the Republican Party nomination. He faced no primary opposition. He faced Manan Trivedi of the Democratic Party in the general election. Costello defeated Trivedi, 56%–44%.

2016

In 2016, Democrat Mike Parrish challenged Costello. Hacked material from Parrish was leaked during the campaign, but the Costello campaign took the position that they would not use the illicitly obtained materials during the election. Vincent Galko, a consultant for Costello, said, "When news broke that this material had likely been stolen by a foreign actor, we immediately said, ‘We’re not going to use it.'"

Costello was re-elected by a wide margin of 57.2 to 42.8.

=== Tenure ===
For his first two terms, Costello represented a district that took in northern Chester County and western Montgomery County, then reached across Berks County to take in much of heavily Republican Lebanon County. However, in February 2018, the Pennsylvania Supreme Court released a new map for the state's congressional districts to replace a map which the court had previously struck down as a Republican partisan gerrymander. The court imposed a new map after the state legislature refused to submit a replacement. Costello was the only incumbent who retained his old district number. However, the 6th was made significantly more compact. It lost most of its heavily Republican western portion, as well as its share of Montgomery County. Instead, it now took in all of Chester County as well as most of the more Democratic portions of Berks County, including Reading. Even before the old map was thrown out, Costello had already attracted a well-financed Democratic challenger, entrepreneur and Air Force veteran Chrissy Houlahan.

According to The Philadelphia Inquirer, "Of the many Republicans who took a political blow from Pennsylvania's new congressional map, Chester County's Ryan Costello got hit the hardest." The new 6th was significantly more Democratic than its predecessor. Had the redrawn district existed in 2016, Hillary Clinton would have won it with 52 percent of the vote to Donald Trump's 43 percent; Clinton carried the old 6th with 48 percent of the vote. Along similar lines, Nate Cohn of The New York Times wrote that the new map put Costello in "very serious trouble," and wondered if Costello would even run for a third term.

The Philadelphia Inquirer wrote that "the previous, GOP-drawn map was one factor aiding Republicans as they held a firm grip on every competitive seat in the moderate Philadelphia suburbs." According to the Pottstown Mercury, the Republican-drawn congressional map was "widely viewed as among the nation’s most gerrymandered." After the new congressional map was released, Costello said he supported impeaching the justices who imposed the map, calling the court corrupt and undemocratic. Republicans requested that the United States Supreme Court intervene in the redistricting dispute, although Politico reported that the Republican challenge was unlikely to be successful. In March 2018, a panel of federal judges refused to block the new congressional map from going into effect.

In March 2018, Costello filed petitions to get on the 2018 ballot, but later that month, he announced that he was dropping his reelection bid. According to The Hill, he became frustrated with the Trump administration, which contributed to his dropping from the race.

After announcing his retirement, CNN called him a "rare brand in the House GOP conference: a young moderate willing to break with his leadership and his President on everything from gun control bills to repealing and replacing the Affordable Care Act." While FiveThirtyEight evaluated Costello's voting record and found that he "voted in line with Trump's position 95.5% of the time," a ranking by the Lugar Center showed Costello was the ninth most bipartisan member of Congress in 2017 and held the second highest bipartisan ranking of any member of Pennsylvania's congressional delegation. In addition, according to data from Quorum, Costello was ranked number five in the top ten Republican members who vote against their own party. Houlahan went on to win the November general election against Greg McCauley.

=== Political positions ===
Throughout his tenure, Costello was ranked as one of the most bipartisan Members of Congress, breaking with his party to support environment, health care, and education initiatives. In 2017, Costello ranked ninth out of 435 Members of Congress in bipartisanship.

In May 2017, Costello broke from his party and voted against the Republican health care legislation, the American Health Care Act (AHCA).

In November 2017, Costello voted for the Republican Party's 2017 tax plan that passed the House. He also voted in favor of a 2018 bipartisan bill to fund the federal government.

== Electoral history ==
Pennsylvania's 6th Congressional District election, 2014

Republican primary results
Party	Candidate	Votes	%
Republican	Ryan Costello	24,313	100

Pennsylvania's 6th Congressional District, 2014
Party	Candidate	Votes	%
Republican	Ryan Costello	119,643	56.29
Democratic	Manan Trivedi	92,901	43.71
Total votes		212,544	100
Republican hold			

Pennsylvania's 6th Congressional District election, 2016

Republican primary results
Party	Candidate	Votes	%
Republican	Ryan Costello (Incumbent)	88,349	100
Total votes		88,349	100

Pennsylvania's 6th Congressional District, 2016
Party	Candidate	Votes	%
Republican	Ryan Costello (Incumbent)	207,469	57.24
Democratic	Mike Parrish	155,000	42.76
Total votes		362,469	100
Republican hold			

== Committee assignments ==
115th Congress

- Committee on Energy and Commerce
  - Subcommittee on Communications and Technology
  - Subcommittee on Digital Commerce and Consumer Protection
  - Subcommittee on Oversight and Investigations

114th Congress

- Committee on Transportation and Infrastructure
  - Subcommittee on Economic Development, Public Buildings and Emergency Management
  - Subcommittee on Highways and Transit
- Committee on Veterans' Affairs
  - Subcommittee on Disability Assistance and Memorial Affairs
  - Subcommittee on Economic Opportunity

=== Caucus memberships ===
- Climate Solutions Caucus

== Post-political career ==
After leaving Congress in January 2019, he announced the formation of Ryan Costello Strategies, a consulting firm. In October 2019, it was reported that he planned to register as a lobbyist following the mandatory one-year cooling off period. In 2023, Costello was hired as an outside lobbyist for Google on "openness and competition" issues.

== Personal life ==
Costello lives along with his wife and two children in West Chester, Pennsylvania. He is a Presbyterian.

U.S. House of Representatives
Preceded by Jim Gerlach	Member of the U.S. House of Representatives from Pennsylvania's 6th congressional district 2015–2019	Succeeded by Chrissy Houlahan
U.S. order of precedence (ceremonial)
Preceded by Joe Sestak as Former U.S. Representative	Order of precedence of the United States as Former U.S. Representative	Succeeded by Conor Lamb as Former U.S. Representative
