= Jay Paterno =

American football player and coach

Biographical details
- Born: State College, Pennsylvania, U.S.

Playing career
- 1986–1990: Penn State
- Position: Quarterback

Coaching career (HC unless noted)
- 1990–1992: Virginia (GA)
- 1993: Connecticut (WR/TE)
- 1994: James Madison (QB)
- 1995–1998: Penn State (TE/RC)
- 1999–2011: Penn State (QB)

Accomplishments and honors

Championships
- National (1986)

Joseph Vincent "Jay" Paterno Jr. (born 1968) is an American football coach who was most recently the passing game coordinator and quarterbacks coach for the Penn State Nittany Lions football team under his father Joe Paterno, former head coach of the team. Also active in politics, Paterno unsuccessfully sought the Democratic Party nomination for Lieutenant Governor of Pennsylvania in 2014. He is currently a member of the Penn State Board of Trustees.

== Playing career ==
Paterno played on the Penn State Nittany Lions football team from 1986–1990 under his father Joe Paterno. He was a reserve quarterback during his senior year, in which he lettered. He also played for State College Area High School.

== Coaching career ==
Paterno was on Penn State's staff for seventeen seasons, twelve of which he served as the quarterbacks coach. He created Penn State's "HD offense" which utilized skill players to touch the ball in a variety of ways. Derrick Williams played under this system. He also coached Michael Robinson to a Heisman Trophy finalist season in 2005. Paterno also served as the tight ends coach and recruiting coordinator. Prior to being on the PSU staff, he served as a graduate assistant at Virginia from 1990 to 1992, wide receivers and tight ends coach at Connecticut in 1993, and as the quarterbacks coach at James Madison in 1994. Paterno's coaching career at Penn State came to an end following the hiring of new head coach Bill O'Brien on January 7, 2012.

In 2011 Paterno was named best quarterbacks coach in the Big Ten by rivals.com. In 2008, he was named one of the best offensive coaches in the country following a Rose Bowl season.

== After Penn State ==
Since his father's death and his dismissal, Paterno has written several guest columns. He has spoken at several young voters rallies including one sponsored by PSU Votes, a nonpartisan political initiative where both he and Penn State women's basketball coach Coquese Washington spoke. Paterno sued Penn State University in federal court claiming the university violated state and federal law in dismissing him in January 2012, but the lawsuit was dismissed in 2016.

== Personal life ==
Jay has four siblings: Diana, Mary Kay, David, and Scott. Unlike his father, who was a staunch Republican, Jay is a Democrat, and supported Barack Obama during the 2008 and 2012 presidential elections.

In October 2013, several outlets reported that Paterno was considering running as a Democrat in Pennsylvania's 5th congressional district, which is based in State College. Instead, Paterno announced in February 2014 that he would be a candidate in the Democratic primary for Lieutenant Governor of Pennsylvania in the 2014 election. Ultimately, he withdrew from the race in March 2014, citing the desire to avoid a legal battle over a challenge to his petition to achieve ballot access. Paterno has five children, including a son named Joseph Vincent Paterno III.
