= 2014 Pennsylvania lieutenant gubernatorial election =

The Pennsylvania lieutenant gubernatorial election of 2014 took place on November 4, 2014, to elect the Lieutenant Governor of Pennsylvania. In Pennsylvania, the winners of the lieutenant gubernatorial primary elections join the ticket of their party's gubernatorial nominee.

== Background ==
Primary elections were held on May 20, 2014. Incumbent Republican Lieutenant Governor Jim Cawley was renominated unopposed and ran for re-election to a second term on a ticket with incumbent Governor Tom Corbett. The Democratic nominee was State Senator Mike Stack, who was businessman Tom Wolf's running mate.

Wolf and Stack defeated Corbett and Cawley in the general election.

== Republican primary ==
=== Candidates ===
==== Declared ====
- Jim Cawley, incumbent Lieutenant Governor

=== Results ===
Republican primary results
Party	Candidate	Votes	%
Republican	Jim Cawley (incumbent)	400,752	100.00
Total votes		400,752	100.00

== Democratic primary ==
=== Candidates ===
==== Declared ====
- Mark Critz, former U.S. Representative
- Brad Koplinski, Harrisburg City Councilman
- Brandon Neuman, state representative
- Mark Smith, Bradford County Commissioner
- Mike Stack, state senator

==== Withdrew ====
- Jay Paterno, former assistant football coach at Penn State and son of former head coach Joe Paterno
- Brenda Alton, Harrisburg Parks and Recreation Director (Turned in petition one minute past the deadline so did not appear on the ballot)

==== Declined ====
- Michael Crossey, President of the Pennsylvania State Education Association
- Margo Davidson, state representative
- Larry Farnese, state senator
- John Galloway, state representative
- John Morganelli, Northampton County District Attorney
- John Wozniak, state senator

=== Polling ===
Poll source	Date(s) administered	Sample size	Margin of error	Mark Critz	Brad Koplinski	Brandon Neuman	Jay Paterno	Mark Smith	Mike Stack	Unde- cided
Harper Polling	May 12–13, 2014	559	±4.14%	18%	9%	5%	—	6%	20%	42%
Harper Polling	Feb. 22–23, 2014	501	±4.38%	16%	4%	7%	17%	2%	6%	48%

=== Results ===
Democratic primary results
Party	Candidate	Votes	%
Democratic	Mike Stack	351,627	46.79
Democratic	Mark Critz	119,334	15.88
Democratic	Mark Smith	109,519	14.57
Democratic	Brad Koplinski	89,524	11.91
Democratic	Brandon Neuman	81,438	10.84
Total votes		751,442	100.00

== See also ==
- 2014 Pennsylvania gubernatorial election
