= Mike Stack =

33rd Lieutenant Governor of Pennsylvania (born 1963)

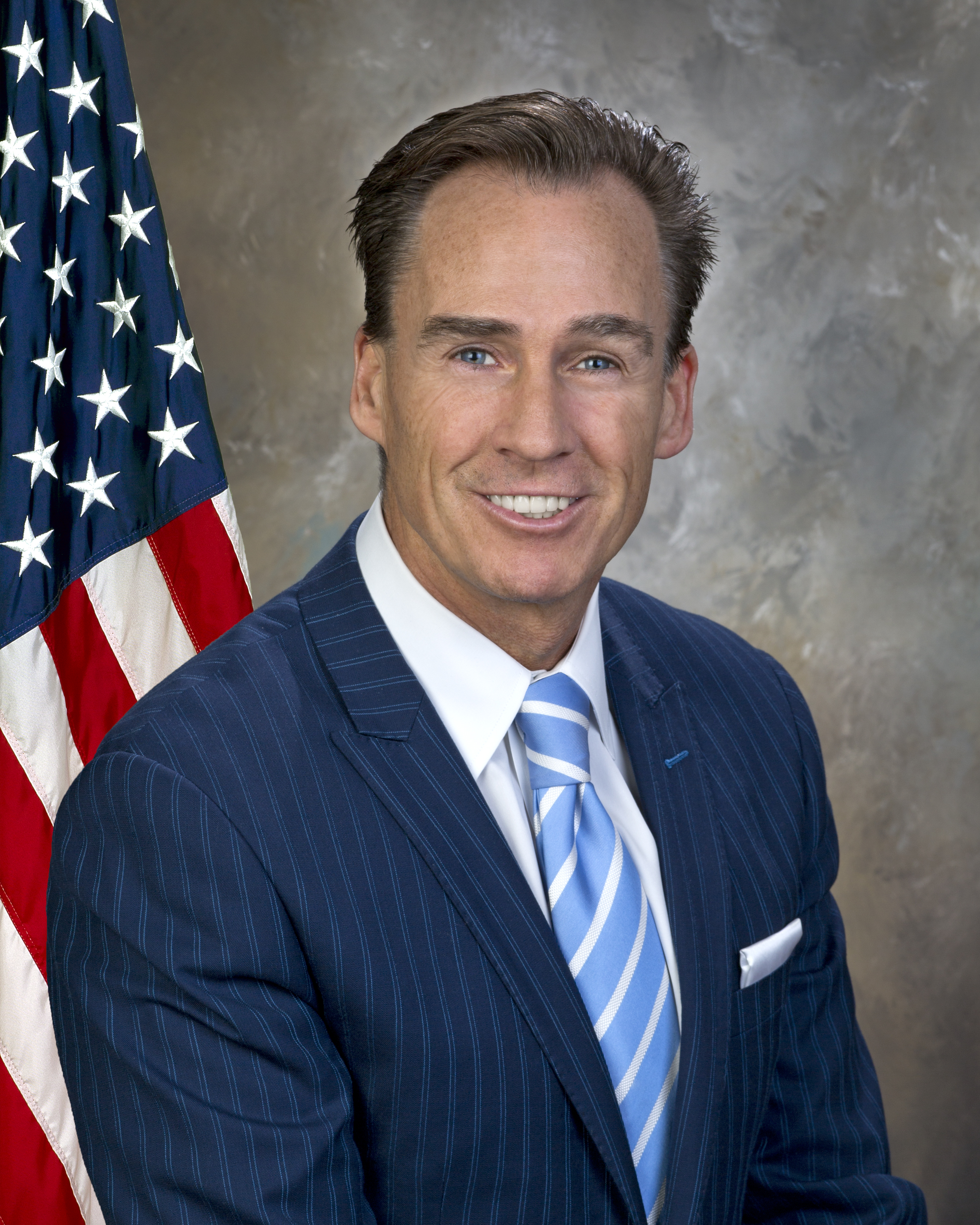
- Official portrait, 2015

33rd Lieutenant Governor of Pennsylvania
- In office January 20, 2015 – January 15, 2019
- Governor: Tom Wolf
- Preceded by: Jim Cawley
- Succeeded by: John Fetterman

Member of the Pennsylvania State Senate from the 5th district
- In office January 2, 2001 – January 20, 2015
- Preceded by: Frank Salvatore
- Succeeded by: John Sabatina

Personal details
- Born: Michael Joseph Stack III; June 5, 1963 (age 63) Washington, D.C., U.S.
- Party: Democratic
- Spouse: Tonya Stack
- Relatives: Michael J. Stack (grandfather)
- Education: La Salle University (BA); Villanova University (JD)

Military service
- Allegiance: United States
- Branch/service: United States Army
- Years of service: 2008–present
- Unit: Army Judge Advocate General's Corps

Michael Joseph Stack III (born June 5, 1963) is an American attorney and former politician who served as the 33rd lieutenant governor of Pennsylvania from 2015 to 2019. A member of the Democratic Party, he previously served as a member of the Pennsylvania State Senate for the 5th district from 2001 to 2015. Stack is the first lieutenant governor of Pennsylvania to be denied renomination, being defeated by then-Mayor John Fetterman.

== Early life and education ==
Stack was born in Washington, D.C. He graduated from La Salle College High School, LaSalle University in 1987 and Villanova University School of Law in 1992.

Stack attended the Judge Advocate General's Legal Center and School at the University of Virginia and entered the United States Army Judge Advocate General's Corps.

== Career ==
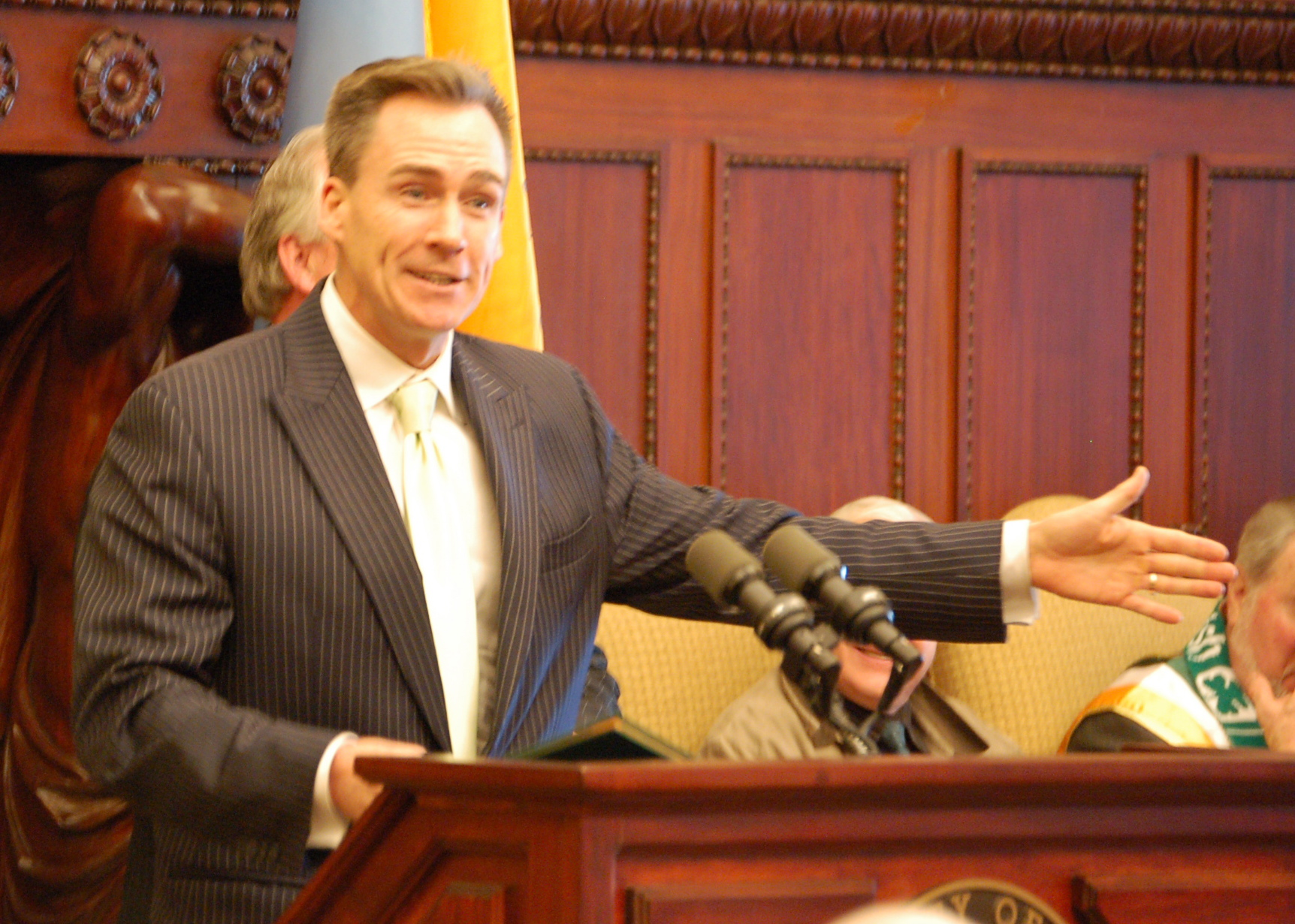
Stack as a state senator in 2009

=== State senate career ===
Stack served in the Pennsylvania Senate from 2001 until 2015. In 2009, Stack was Democratic leader of Philadelphia's 58th ward.

=== Lieutenant governor term ===
He was the Democratic nominee for lieutenant governor of Pennsylvania in the 2014 election, running with Democratic gubernatorial nominee Tom Wolf. The Wolf/Stack ticket defeated the Republican Tom Corbett/Jim Cawley ticket in the 2014 gubernatorial election. Stack took the oath of office January 20, 2015. While serving as lieutenant governor, Stack had a high-profile falling out with governor Tom Wolf, owing in part to Stack's alleged mistreatment of staff and a difference in management styles with Wolf.

On May 15, 2018, Stack lost the state Democratic primary for lieutenant governor to Braddock Mayor John Fetterman, placing fourth overall. Stack is the only lieutenant governor of Pennsylvania to lose his renomination bid.

Stack ran briefly for a Philadelphia City Council at-large position, though withdrew in March 2019 after drawing a poor ballot position. His spokesman said Stack would continue to consider other opportunities for public service.

=== Subsequent career ===
Following his withdrawal from the city council race, Stack moved to California, where he was operating as of January 2020 as a comedian under the name "Mikey Stacks". Stack's routine involves self-deprecating jokes about his nickname "Mikey", as well as jokes around his mother's cooking, Donald Trump, Opioid use disorder and teenage suicide.

In August 2021, Stack appeared on the AWE show Find Me a Luxury Home, wherein he described himself as a lawyer seeking to purchase a $7 million home in Manhattan Beach, California. In October 2021, it was reported that Stack was contemplating a return to politics, considering a run in his old state senate district following incumbent senator John Sabatina's announcement that he would not seek re-election. In 2022, Stack said he might run for Mayor of Philadelphia as an independent in 2023. In January 2023, Stack announced he was running for mayor. In February 2023, he dropped out of the race.

Stack appeared on the CBS game show Let’s Make a Deal; dressed as a Roman soldier and introducing himself as a former state senator from Pennsylvania and a retired Army captain. The episode aired on December 19, 2024.

== Personal life ==
Stack's grandfather, Michael J. Stack, was a U.S congressman from 1935 to 1939.

In 2002, he was named to the PoliticsPA list of best-dressed legislators.

== Electoral history ==
Pennsylvania Senate, District 5, 1988
Party	Candidate	Votes	%
Republican	Frank Salvatore (incumbent)	58,331	56.83
Democratic	Michael Stack III	44,308	43.17
Total votes		102,639	100.00
Republican hold			

Pennsylvania Senate, District 5, 1992
Party	Candidate	Votes	%
Republican	Frank Salvatore (incumbent)	52,211	54.06
Democratic	Michael Stack III	44,362	45.94
Total votes		96,573	100.00
Republican hold			

Pennsylvania Senate, District 5, 2000
Party	Candidate	Votes	%
Democratic	Michael Stack III	46,980	52.55
Republican	Frank Salvatore (incumbent)	42,416	47.45
Total votes		89,396	100.00
Democratic gain from Republican			

Pennsylvania Senate, District 5, 2004
Party	Candidate	Votes	%
Democratic	Michael Stack III (incumbent)	66,844	65.74
Republican	Sam Mirarchi	34,829	34.26
Total votes		101,673	100.00
Democratic hold			

Pennsylvania Senate, District 5, 2008
Party	Candidate	Votes	%
Democratic	Michael Stack III (incumbent)	71,141	71.97
Republican	John Farley	27,702	28.03
Total votes		98,843	100.00
Democratic hold			

Pennsylvania Senate, District 5, 2012
Party	Candidate	Votes	%
Democratic	Michael Stack III (incumbent)	65,587	71.65
Republican	Michael Tomlinson	25,954	28.35
Total votes		91,541	100.00
Democratic hold			

2014 Pennsylvania lieutenant gubernatorial election, Democratic Primary
Party	Candidate	Votes	%
Democratic	Michael Stack III	351,627	46.79
Democratic	Mark Critz	119,334	15.88
Democratic	Mark Smith	109,519	14.57
Democratic	Brad Koplinski	89,524	11.91
Democratic	Brandon Neuman	81,438	10.84
Total votes		751,442	100.00

2014 Pennsylvania gubernatorial election
Party	Candidate	Votes	%	±%
Democratic	Tom Wolf Michael Stack III	1,920,355	54.93%	+9.42%
Republican	Tom Corbett (incumbent) Jim Cawley (incumbent)	1,575,511	45.07%	−9.42%
Total votes		3,495,866	100.00%	N/A
Democratic gain from Republican				

2018 Pennsylvania lieutenant gubernatorial election, Democratic Primary
Party	Candidate	Votes	%
Democratic	John Fetterman	288,229	38.0
Democratic	Nina Ahmad	182,309	23.8
Democratic	Kathi Cozzone	142,410	18.6
Democratic	Mike Stack (incumbent)	127,259	16.6
Democratic	Ray Sosa	27,427	3.6
Total votes		767,634	100.0

Pennsylvania State Senate
Preceded by Frank Salvatore	Member from the 5th district 2001–2015	Succeeded by John Sabatina
Party political offices
Preceded by Scott Conklin	Democratic nominee for Lieutenant Governor of Pennsylvania; 2014	Succeeded by John Fetterman
Political offices
Preceded by Jim Cawley	Lieutenant Governor of Pennsylvania; 2015–2019	Succeeded by John Fetterman
