= Benjamin Hornberger =

American politician

Personal details
- Party: Republican
- Education: Bellwood-Antis School District

Benjamin Hornberger is an American politician. A Republican, he represents Antis Township in Blair County, Pennsylvania as a township supervisor. In addition to a successful bid for township supervisor, Hornberger ran for the United States House of Representatives in 2018, and briefly hinted at a run for county commissioner in 2019.

== Early life and education ==
Hornberger grew up in Blair County, Pennsylvania, United States, and received his education at the Bellwood-Antis School District schools located in the upper half of Blair County. Following his high-school graduation, Hornberger enrolled in the United States Marines and served in different locations located throughout the United States. Following his tenure in the military, he returned to his home and branded himself as a relentless supporter of Donald Trump in both the 2016 Republican primary and the 2016 Presidential Election. Hornberger's activism stemmed so far that foreign news agencies, such as AFP, interviewed him to provide insight to the grassroots work of the Trump campaign.

== Political career ==
=== 2018 U.S. House primary ===
After volunteering for Donald Trump in his successful 2016 election campaign against former secretary of state and First Lady of the United States Hillary Clinton, Hornberger found it necessary to run for the U.S. House to support President Trump. Following the 2016 Republican Primary between U.S. Rep. Bill Shuster and challenger Art Halvorson in which Shuster, a fifteen-year incumbent, narrowly edged out Halvorson, many political spectators viewed the House Transportation Chairman Shuster as vulnerable. Hornberger intended to hammer Shuster on his perceived lack of attention to the then-9th Congressional District in Pennsylvania, votes for bloated budgets, lack of transparency, and long tenure in office. Hornberger initially intended to run in 2020, although announcing in 2017, but redirected his attention to the 2018 primary after Shuster announced his retirement from Congress. The dynamic of the race also shifted as the Pennsylvania Supreme Court ruled the 2010 Congressional maps as unconstitutional and redrew the map. The 9th district became Pennsylvania 13th Congressional District, consisting largely of the old 9th but shifted eastward.

In the 2018 primary, Hornberger competed with Altoona dermatologist John Joyce, Pennsylvania State Senator John Eichelberger, former Congressional candidate Art Halvorson, Pennsylvania State Representative Stephen Bloom, veteran Douglas Mastriano, former Congressional candidate Travis Schooley, and business owner Bernie Washabaugh II. Following a heated and contentious primary, dermatologist John Joyce won with 22.0%, or 14,828 votes. Hornberger finished last with 1.8%, or 1,195 votes. Criticism revolved around his age falling short of the Constitutionally required 25 minimum age requirement to serve in the U.S. House.

=== 2019 run for Blair County Commissioner ===
In December 2018, Benjamin Hornberger announced his intention to seek the office of Blair County Commissioner. While he held a small rally at a local pizza shop in Altoona, Pennsylvania, he decided to back out of the race once 2019 started and never officially circulated a petition for nomination.

=== 2021 Antis Township Supervisor race ===
In 2021, Hornberger announced his candidacy for the Republican nomination for a seat on the Antis Township Board of Supervisors. He faced off with media creator Chris Forshey, Lance Kustaborder, and business owner J. Steven Winterstein. In the May primary, Hornberger emerged victorious with 41.4%, or 433 votes. Despite a successful primary, Hornberger lost the general to J. Steven Winterstein, who received enough write-in votes in the primary to appear as a Democrat on the November ballot. Hornberger received 48.7%, or 749 votes, compared to Winterstein's 51.3%, or 790 votes.

=== 2023 Antis Township Supervisor race ===
In 2023, Hornberger again announced a run for Antis Township Supervisor, with the aim to take out incumbent Bob Smith. In March, however, Hornberger faced a petition challenge due to his failure to complete the financial disclosure statement on his petitions and was promptly removed from the Republican primary ballot. Despite this, Hornberger filed as an independent for the same seat and won an upset victory in the fall, besting Smith by 7.5%, or 152 votes. Given the election held two openings to vote for, the top vote getter was Republican George Bell with 40%, or 1,002 votes.

Hornberger officially joined the board of supervisors in January 2024. He rejoined the Republican Party in the spring of 2024, returning the Antis Township board to a unanimous Republican board.

== Electoral history ==
2018 Republican primary election: U.S. House of Representatives, District 13
Party	Candidate	Votes	%
Republican	John Joyce	14,828	22.0%
Republican	John Eichelberger	13,311	19.8%
Republican	Stephen Bloom	12,231	18.2%
Republican	Douglas Mastriano	10,509	15.6%
Republican	Art Halvorson	10,323	15.3%
Republican	Travis Schooley	3,036	4.5%
Republican	Bernie Washabaugh II	1,913	2.8%
Republican	Benjamin Hornberger	1,195	1.8%

2021 Republican primary election: Board of Supervisors, Antis Township
Party	Candidate	Votes	%
Republican	Benjamin Hornberger	433	41.1%
Republican	J. Steven Winterstein	335	31.8%
Republican	Christopher Forshey	218	20.7%
Republican	Lance Kustaborder	64	6.1%

2021 General election: Board of Supervisors, Antis Township
Party	Candidate	Votes	%
Democratic	J. Steven Winterstein	790	51.3%
Republican	Benjamin Hornberger	749	48.7%

2023 General election: Board of Supervisors, Antis Township
Party	Candidate	Votes	%
Republican	George Bell	1,002	40%
Independent	Benjamin Hornberger	820	32.8%
Republican	Robert Bob Smith	662	26.5%

== Controversies ==
2017 Negligent Discharge

While attending an anti-antifa rally at the Gettysburg battlefield, Hornberger (at the time 23 years old) shot himself with a revolver. In the moment, he had the gun secured in a holster on his belt. The gun went off while in the holster after Hornberger accidentally hit the gun with a flagpole. When emergency services arrived, he was said to be in 'good spirits' emergency services also noted that the fire arm was "bad" and in general not in good condition.

Prior Support of President Obama

While in recent years Mr. Hornberger has been a staunch supporter of President Trump and the Republican party he had prior affiliation to the Democrat party. In 2008 Mr. Hornberger was one of the volunteers that helped President Obama win Pennsylvania. His family is largely working class with Italian-American roots a group that was at the core of democratic politics prior to the 2016 election.

2018 Primary Age Issue

During the 2018 republican primary for PA-13 Mr. Hornberger was 23 years old falling short of the 25 year old age requirement set by the constitution. While there have been a few notable exceptions to this, and a process for circumventing these rules it is not a common process. Mr. Hornberger believed that congress would use article 1 section 5 in order to seat him.
