= 2001 Pennsylvania's 9th congressional district special election =

- May 15, 2001

Pennsylvania's 9th congressional district
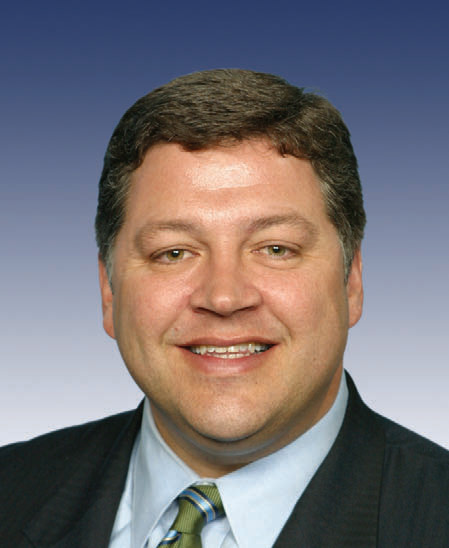

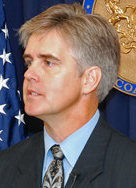
| Nominee | Bill Shuster | Scott Conklin |
| Party | Republican | Democratic |
| Popular vote | 55,549 | 47,049 |
| Percentage | 51.91% | 43.96% |
- County results Shuster: 40–50% 50–60% 60–70% Conklin: 50–60%
U.S. Representative before election
Bud Shuster
Republican
Elected U.S. Representative
Bill Shuster
Republican

The 2001 Pennsylvania's 9th congressional district special election was held on May 15, 2001, to succeed Republican Congressman Bud Shuster, who resigned on February 3, 2001, citing ill health. Shuster's son, Bill Shuster, was selected as the Republican nominee, and he won the special election against Centre County Commissioner Scott Conklin, the Democratic nominee, receiving 52 percent of the vote to Conklin's 44 percent.

== Republican nomination ==
Shortly after Congressman Shuster announced his retirement, his son, Bill Shuster, the owner of a car dealership, announced that he would seek the Republican nomination. Shuster, Blair County Commissioner John Eichelberger, and State Representative Patrick Fleagle emerged as the frontrunners in the campaign to win the Republican nomination. Each of the county parties selected delegates to vote for the party's nominee at the district convention, which was held at Juniata College in Huntingdon on February 17, 2001. At the convention, Shuster won the nomination by a large margin.

=== Candidates ===
- Bill Shuster, car dealer, son of Congressman Shuster
- Patrick Fleagle, State Representative
- John Eichelberger, Blair County Commissioner
- Lynn Herman, State Representative
- Bonnie Mellott-Keefer, Fulton County Treasurer
- Monte Kemmler, businessman
- Connie Lucas, Centre County Commissioner
- Joyce Haas, Republican state committeewoman
- Stephen Luhrs, businessman
- Don Browder
- David Bahr

==== Declined ====
- Jake Corman, State Senator
- Warren Elliott, Franklin County Commissioner
- Terry L. Punt, State Senator
- Michael Ross, businessman

=== Convention vote ===
Republican convention results
| Party | Candidate | Votes | % |
|---|---|---|---|
| Republican | Bill Shuster | 69 | 51.88% |
| Republican | Patrick Fleagle | 38 | 28.57% |
| Republican | John Eichelberger | 10 | 7.52% |
| Republican | Lynn Herman | 8 | 6.02% |
| Republican | Bonnie Mellott-Keefer | 4 | 3.01% |
| Republican | Monte Kemmler | 4 | 3.01% |
| Republican | Connie Lucas | 0 | 0.00% |
| Republican | Joyce Haas | 0 | 0.00% |
| Republican | Stephen Luhrs | 0 | 0.00% |
| Republican | Don Browder | 0 | 0.00% |
| Republican | David Bahr | 0 | 0.00% |
| Total votes | | 133 | 100.00% |

== Democratic nomination ==
Centre County Commissioner Scott Conklin announced that he would seek the Democratic Party's nomination, and campaigned as a moderate, "pro-life and pro-gun Democrat." Though several other candidates, including State Representatives Jeffrey Coy and Bud George, considered running, they declined to do so, and Conklin won the nomination over Penn State Law professor Stacey Brumbaugh.

== General election ==
=== Candidates ===
- Bill Shuster (Republican)
- Scott Conklin (Democratic)
- Alanna Hartzok (Green)

=== Results ===
2001 Pennsylvania's 9th congressional district special election
| Party | Candidate | Votes | % |
|---|---|---|---|
| Republican | Bill Shuster | 55,549 | 51.91% |
| Democratic | Scott Conklin | 47,049 | 43.96% |
| Green | Alanna Hartzok | 4,420 | 4.13% |
| Total votes | | 107,018 | 100.00% |
| Republican hold | | | |

==== By county ====
| County | Bill Shuster Republican | | Scott Conklin Democratic | | Alanna Hartzok Green | | Margin | | Total votes cast |
| County | # | % | # | % | # | % | # | % | Total votes cast |
|---|---|---|---|---|---|---|---|---|---|
| Bedford | 6,847 | 61.2% | 4,021 | 35.9% | 327 | 2.9% | 2,826 | 25.3% | 11,195 |
| Blair | 15,203 | 57.5% | 10,384 | 39.3% | 860 | 3.3% | 4,819 | 18.2% | 26,447 |
| Centre (part) | 1,393 | 36.5% | 2,233 | 58.5% | 192 | 5.0% | -840 | -22.0% | 3,818 |
| Clearfield (part) | 6,569 | 40.4% | 8,981 | 55.3% | 691 | 4.3% | -2,412 | -14.9% | 16,241 |
| Franklin | 8,793 | 48.2% | 8,328 | 45.6% | 1,126 | 6.2% | 465 | 2.6% | 18,247 |
| Fulton | 1,432 | 53.5% | 1,168 | 43.6% | 76 | 2.8% | 264 | 9.9% | 2,676 |
| Huntingdon | 4,887 | 49.3% | 4,610 | 46.5% | 412 | 4.2% | 277 | 2.8% | 9,909 |
| Juniata | 2,537 | 52.7% | 2,113 | 43.9% | 163 | 3.4% | 424 | 8.8% | 4,813 |
| Mifflin | 3,449 | 50.5% | 3,157 | 46.2% | 228 | 3.3% | 292 | 4.3% | 6,834 |
| Perry (part) | 1,204 | 68.1% | 480 | 27.1% | 84 | 4.8% | 724 | 41.0% | 1,768 |
| Snyder | 3,235 | 63.8% | 1,574 | 31.0% | 261 | 5.1% | 1,661 | 32.8% | 5,070 |
| Totals | 55,670 | 51.9% | 47,220 | 44.0% | 4,437 | 4.1% | 8,450 | 7.9% | 107,327 |
