= Doug Mastriano =

American politician (born 1964)

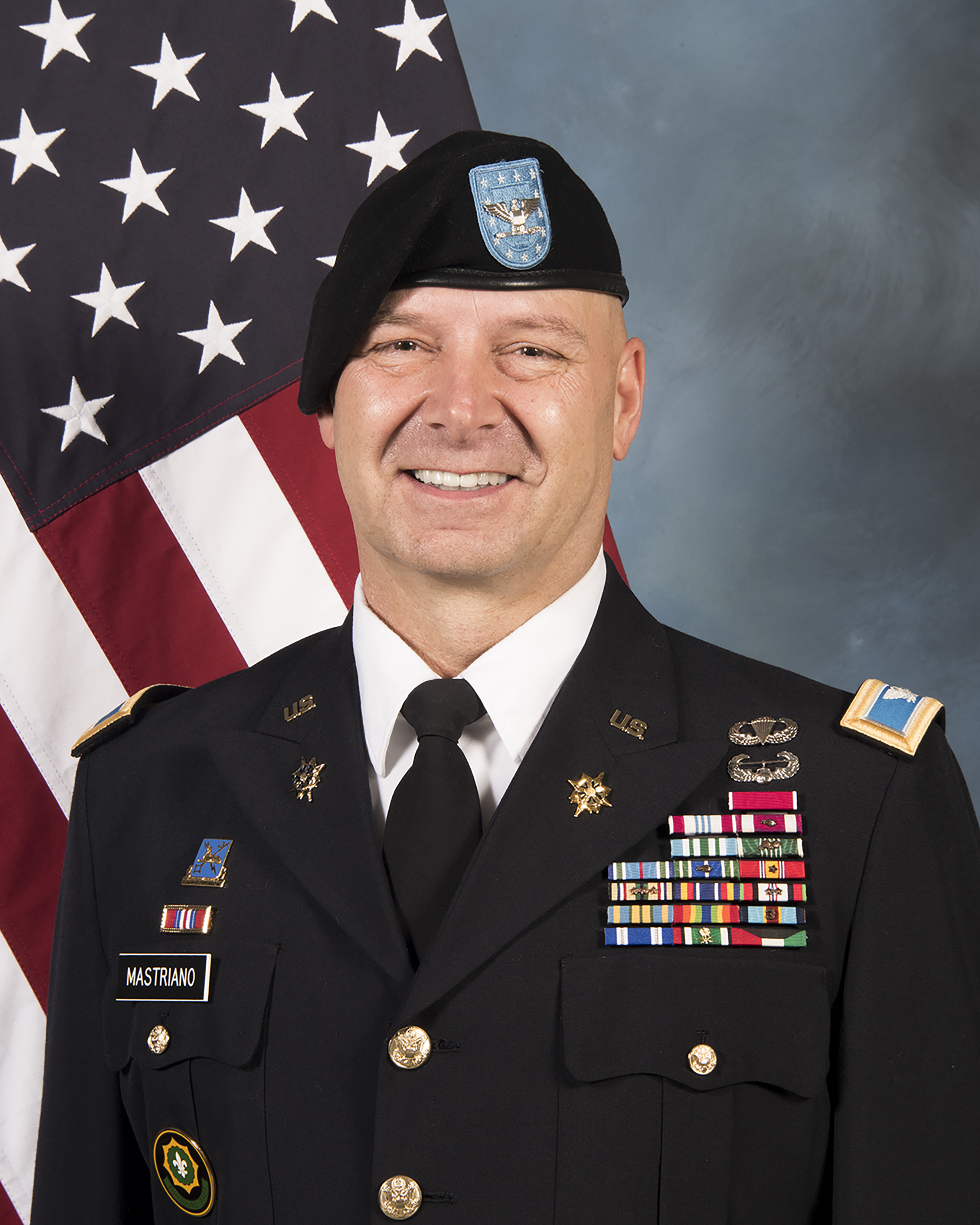
- Official portrait, 2017

United States Ambassador to Slovakia
- Nominee
- Assuming office TBD
- President: Donald Trump
- Succeeding: Heather Rogers (acting)

Member of the Pennsylvania Senate from the 33rd district
- Incumbent
- Assumed office June 10, 2019
- Preceded by: Richard Alloway

Personal details
- Born: Douglas Vincent Mastriano; January 2, 1964 (age 62) New Brunswick, New Jersey, U.S.
- Party: Republican
- Spouse: Rebbie Stewart (m. 1987)
- Children: 1
- Education: Mercer County Community College; Eastern University (BA); National Intelligence University (MS); Air University (MMAS, MA); United States Army War College (MS); University of New Brunswick (PhD)
- Website: Campaign website; State Senate website

Military service
- Branch/service: United States Army
- Years of service: 1986–2017
- Rank: Colonel
- Unit: 2nd Cavalry Regiment; 3rd Infantry Division; United States Army Europe and Africa
- Battles/wars: Gulf War; Iraq War

Douglas Vincent Mastriano (born January 2, 1964) is an American far-right politician and retired military officer who has served in the Pennsylvania Senate since winning a special election in 2019, representing the 33rd district. Mastriano served in the United States Army from 1986 to 2017 and attained the rank of colonel. A Republican, he ran for U.S. Congress in Pennsylvania's 13th congressional district in 2018, where he finished fourth in the primary. In May 2026, President Donald Trump nominated Mastriano to be the U.S. Ambassador to Slovakia.

Mastriano is a prominent figure in fundamentalist Christian nationalism and has called the separation of church and state a myth. He has made social media posts referencing QAnon and has spoken at events that promoted QAnon and 9/11 conspiracy theories. An election denier and self-professed close ally of President Donald Trump, Mastriano received national attention for his attempts to overturn the 2020 United States presidential election.

He attended Trump's January 6 rally in Washington, D.C., prior to Trump supporters' storming of the United States Capitol, and was seen on video passing through Capitol Police barriers after they had been breached by others in the crowd. Mastriano was subpoenaed by the United States House Select Committee on the January 6 Attack in February 2022, but stopped cooperating with the Select Committee the following August.

Mastriano was the Republican nominee during the 2022 Pennsylvania gubernatorial election, defeating former representative Lou Barletta in the primaries before facing the Democratic candidate Josh Shapiro, the then sitting attorney general. He centered his campaign on the 2020 election being "stolen" and opposition to COVID-19 mask mandates. He earned 41.71% of the vote to Shapiro's 56.49%.

== Early life and education ==
=== Early life ===
Mastriano was born in New Brunswick, New Jersey, on January 2, 1964, the son of Richard L. and Janice C. (Bono) Mastriano. Raised in Hightstown, New Jersey, he graduated from Hightstown High School in 1982. He was a member of the Boy Scouts of America and obtained the rank of Eagle Scout. He then attended Mercer County Community College, where he was a member of Psi Beta and Phi Theta Kappa.

Mastriano himself has said that he did not grow up in a "strong Christian family", but was led to embrace religion as a teenager by an "on-fire youth pastor" after being invited to a youth group called "The Way".

In 1986, Mastriano received a bachelor's degree in history from Eastern College. While at Eastern, he participated in the Reserve Officers' Training Corps.

=== Continued education ===
Mastriano received a master's degree in strategic intelligence from the Joint Intelligence College in 1992. His education also includes a master's degree in airpower theory from the Air University in 2001. In 2002, he received a master's degree in military operational art and science from the Air University's School of Advanced Air and Space Studies. He received a master's degree in strategic studies from the United States Army War College in 2010.

While a Major at Air University, Mastriano wrote a thesis titled "The Civilian Putsch of 2018: Debunking the Myth of a Civil-Military Leadership Rift". In the thesis, Mastriano writes from a perspective of a colonel, like himself, who is forced to hide out in a cave because a politically correct leader has taken over America and killed millions.

In 2013, Mastriano completed a Ph.D. in history from the University of New Brunswick.

==== Allegations of academic misconduct ====
During his 2022 run for governor of Pennsylvania, formal complaints were made to the University of New Brunswick (UNB) about potential academic fraud contained in his book published about Alvin York. As Mastriano's book on York was heavily based on his Ph.D. thesis, this eventually prompted the university to launch an investigation to determine if his history Ph.D. awarded in 2013 was fraudulent. The complaint cited 213 allegations of potential academic misconduct contained in Mastriano's doctoral thesis. Regarding the incident, Jeffrey Brown, a UNB associate professor who was listed on Mastriano's doctoral dissertation, said that "[Mastriano] was awarded a Ph.D. on very shaky grounds." Brown also said that Mastriano's work was "dishonest, sloppy, ... and indifferent to facts that contradicted his claims". James Gregory, an educator and a history PhD candidate, has found more than 150 problems with Mastriano's doctoral thesis and has said it amounts to "academic fraud". Mastriano claimed that the accusations were made due to his political beliefs, stating that he "did have concerns that some of the left-leaning professors there would hold [his] politics or [his] military background against [him]." In May 2023, the University of New Brunswick appointed three professors from other institutions to review Mastriano's dissertation for academic fraud. The committee's final report was not made public. In 2024, Mastriano filed a lawsuit against the University of New Brunswick, alleging them of "leaking his doctoral thesis and of participating in a scheme to discredit his research on a First World War hero".

== Military career ==
After college, Mastriano was commissioned as a second lieutenant in the United States Army and assigned to the Military Intelligence Corps. After initial training, he started his career in Nuremberg, Germany, with the 2nd Armored Cavalry Regiment in the area of the West German borders with East Germany and Czechoslovakia. Mastriano also spent four years at the NATO Land Headquarters in Heidelberg, Germany. Mastriano was deployed to Iraq for Operation Desert Storm in 1991. He served at the DLIFLC in Monterey, California, as the company commander of Alpha company from 1995 to 1996. Mastriano then was in Washington, DC, in the 3rd Infantry Division and US Army Europe. He ended his military career as a faculty instructor in the Department of Military Strategy at the U.S. Army War College in Carlisle, Pennsylvania, during 2012–2017, and retired in 2017 at the rank of colonel.

== 2018 congressional campaign ==
On February 13, 2018, at the Otterbein Church in Waynesboro, Pennsylvania, Mastriano announced his candidacy for U.S. representative for Pennsylvania's 9th congressional district, a seat being vacated by the retiring congressman Bill Shuster. Less than a week after his announcement, the Supreme Court of Pennsylvania redrew the congressional district map of Pennsylvania after ruling the previous map unconstitutional (due to gerrymandering by the majority Republican Party), and the area previously covered by the 9th District corresponds most closely to the new 13th District, so Mastriano became a candidate for Pennsylvania's 13th congressional district.

During his run for Congress, Mastriano made multiple controversial statements including stating that same-sex marriage and adoption by same-sex couples should "[a]bsolutely not" be legal. He also said that Islam is not compatible with the constitution and that recipients of the Deferred Action for Childhood Arrivals program should be deported.

Mastriano ultimately finished fourth of the eight candidates in the primary election, receiving 10,485 votes.

== Pennsylvania State Senate ==
=== Electoral history ===
==== 2019 ====
On January 22, 2019, Mastriano announced that he intended to run for the State Senate seat being vacated by Rich Alloway in the 33rd District, saying he "can't, in good conscience, stand aside", wanting to "serve his country in a new way". Mastriano won the Republican nomination for the May 21 election at a party conference held in Gettysburg on March 30, 2019.

Val DiGiorgio, the chairman of the Republican Party of Pennsylvania, said "Doug Mastriano is the kind of conservative candidate that reflects the values of South Central Pennsylvania and will be a key asset in helping advance the Republican agenda in Harrisburg."

On May 21, 2019, Mastriano defeated Democrat Sarah Hammond with 70% of the vote. Mastriano was sworn into the Pennsylvania Senate on June 10.

===== Campaign Facebook page controversy =====
Mastriano has been criticized by some religious leaders and the Pennsylvania Democratic leadership for posts on his campaign's Facebook page, "Doug Mastriano Fighting for Freedom".

In May 2019, during his campaign for state senate, Mastriano spread Islamophobic content via several shared posts on his campaign Facebook page targeting Muslims. "Islam wants to kill gay rights, Judaism, Christianity and pacifism" read one of the posts, which critiqued the common "Coexist" bumper stickers. After the fire at the Notre-Dame cathedral in Paris, Mastriano had shared an image that was circulated implying that it had been an act perpetrated by Muslim terrorists, with a caption reading "something wicked comes this way". He also made birtherist allusions regarding president Obama. In April 2018, his campaign Facebook page shared an article headlined, "A Dangerous Trend: Muslims running for office".

While various Democratic critics have condemned his Facebook posts, neither Mastriano, the county, nor the state Republican party responded publicly to questions raised about the issues.

==== 2020 ====
On November 3, 2020, Mastriano was re-elected to the Pennsylvania State Senate for the 33rd District by 68.7 percent of the vote. His Democratic opponent Rich Sterner had 31.3 percent.

==== 2024 ====
Mastriano briefly considered running in the 2024 senate election before ultimately declining to do so and endorsing the eventual winner Dave McCormick. He instead stood for re-election to the state senate, winning another term with 69.03% of the vote.

=== Tenure ===
==== Cannabis prohibition ====
Mastriano opposed efforts by Governor Tom Wolf to legalize recreational cannabis. He has said that cannabis "causes an increase in violence, mental illness and driving under the influence" and that ending the prohibition is "madness and stupid". In a 2019 interview, in reference to states like California and Colorado that have legalized cannabis, Mastriano has said "[all] it's done is destroy their society," and turned the states "into rat holes and third-world backwashes".

==== Caucus meetings ====
In 2021, Mastriano was banned from attending closed-door Republican state senate caucus meetings after he publicly shared information that was meant to be confidential. After fellow members requested he be let back in, Mastriano was allowed to attend caucus meetings starting on May 23, 2022.

==== Chemtrails ====
Mastriano has made social media posts reminiscent of the chemtrail conspiracy theory. In December 2022, Mastriano posted photos of contrails over his senate district and linked to an article discussing a government research proposal to investigate whether releasing aerosols into the upper atmosphere to reflect solar radiation would combat climate change. In November 2023, Mastriano posted another photo of what he insinuated were abnormal contrails, and claimed, "I have legislation to stop this."

==== Confederate monuments ====
In early summer 2020, fictitious rumors circulated online that a July 4 protest near Gettysburg National Military Park would involve burning the US Flag and calling for the removal of Confederate monuments and memorials. No permit was issued and although the protest did not materialize, "hundreds" of individuals showed up to counter the fictitious protest, many in tactical gear, heavily armed, and brandishing Confederate flags. Profanity-laced shouting matches took place between this group and cemetery visitors throughout the afternoon. In October 2020, Mastriano introduced Senate Bill 1321 to protect such monuments from being removed or vandalized. Mastriano said "We don't have to destroy the past. We don't have to rewrite the past ... We should learn from it, understand it, and become even better."

==== COVID-19 policies ====
On March 17, 2020, Mastriano called for suspension of the HIPAA law to allow the Department of Health to share more COVID-19 data, including publishing the names and addresses of those infected with the virus.

On March 28, 2020, during the COVID-19 pandemic, Mastriano proposed legislation that would allow Pennsylvania businesses to reopen if they followed CDC mitigation guidelines, subject to health department and law enforcement inspections.

Mastriano spoke during an anti-lockdown protest held on April 20, 2020, in support of reopening Pennsylvania during the state's ongoing pandemic.

On May 11, 2020, Mastriano called for the resignation of Secretary of Health Rachel Levine, saying she was "being complicit in the virus spreading through our elder care homes, triggered by unscientific and illogical directives, forcing them to readmit COVID-19 patients", and that she was "responsible for the deaths of approximately 2,500 of our citizens, and display[ing] the gross incompetence of someone unfit for office".

In May 2020, Mastriano wrote a letter signed by other Republican state legislators and a county commissioner calling for his home county of Franklin County to move out of the "red" phase of Governor Tom Wolf's reopening plan. At the time Franklin County's seat Chambersburg had one of the highest average daily growth rates of COVID-19 cases in the country. Mastriano's initiative was opposed by the mayor of Chambersburg and two county commissioners.

In response to a Pennsylvania mask-wearing order, Mastriano called for a mask-burning party at a rally in Gettysburg on July 22, 2020. At the rally, Mastriano urged people to reject store employees telling them to wear a mask and "tell them to mind your own business and say you're exempt".

In March 2022, Mastriano introduced legislation that would make it easier for Pennsylvanians who are diagnosed with COVID-19 to access dubious drug treatments such as hydroxychloroquine, azithromycin and ivermectin. Medical studies have shown that there is no medical benefit to those drugs in treating COVID-19.

==== Firearms ====
In July 2022, following a string of mass shootings, including the Robb Elementary School shooting in Uvalde, Texas, Mastriano introduced legislation that would arm teachers and staff inside of schools. The legislation was criticized by the president of the Pittsburgh Federation of Teachers as "a dangerous, kind of scary proposal".

==== Municipal separate storm sewer systems opposition ====
Mastriano was a vocal opponent of the implementation of municipal separate storm sewer systems (MS4) programs as applied by the Pennsylvania Department of Environmental Protection. In an op-ed, Mastriano wrote, in part,:

A week rarely passes without me hearing from multiple residents who have been severely impacted by Harrisburg's latest revenue scheme. Since 2017, DEP has combined water quality standard requirements with MS4 and expanded beyond the original scope of the law. It now taxes impervious surfaces (which are not included in the Clean Water Act) and it applies MS4 requirements to any stormwater source, whether or not it discharges into navigable waterways. .. This oppressive government overreach has resulted in a program that is crushing our municipalities. MS4 was never intended to force small towns to spend hundreds of thousands of dollars on what is essentially a new public utility that gobbles up taxpayer money whether or not it rains!

== Efforts to overturn 2020 presidential election results and positive COVID-19 diagnosis ==
On November 5, 2020, Mastriano alleged various irregularities in the voting process for the U.S. presidential election and called for the resignation of the Secretary of the Commonwealth Kathy Boockvar. He sent a lengthy letter to Boockvar saying that "Nothing is more crucial to Americans than confidence that our voices will be heard through voting," and "Pennsylvanians no longer feel secure in casting their vote." On November 6, Mastriano and two other state senators, Michele Brooks and Scott Hutchinson, issued a joint memo calling for a full recount "in any counties where state law was broken, regardless of the Department of State's instructions, as well as in any precinct where questionable actions were demonstrated".

At Mastriano's request, a public meeting of the Republican Party's Majority Policy Committee of the Pennsylvania Senate was held on November 25, 2020, at the Wyndham hotel near Gettysburg, Pennsylvania, about claims of election fraud. The meeting, which lasted more than four hours, was organized by Mastriano (although Mastriano was not a member of the Policy Committee) and was chaired by Pennsylvania State Senator Dave Argall. President Donald Trump's legal team, including Trump's attorney Rudy Giuliani, gave a lengthy presentation in the meeting, and Trump himself participated by phone. Trump made false claims at the meeting alleging unfairness in the election process and saying he should be declared the winner. "This election was rigged, and we can't let that happen. This election has to be turned around because we won Pennsylvania by a lot and we won all these swing states by a lot," he said. Immediately after the meeting, Trump invited some of the Pennsylvania lawmakers, including Mastriano, to meet with him in the West Wing of the White House on the same day. The Republican leadership in the Pennsylvania legislature did not attend Trump's White House meeting and all those who did participate initially refused to discuss what happened at the meeting.

On November 27, Mastriano and three other state senators announced that they would introduce a resolution to permit the state legislature to appoint delegates to the Electoral College instead of following the results of the presidential vote in the state. The proposed resolution, as circulated in a memorandum seeking additional co-sponsorships, alleges that "officials in the Executive and Judicial Branches of the Commonwealth infringed upon the General Assembly's authority by unlawfully changing the rules governing the November 3, 2020 election in the Commonwealth", and declares, "based on the facts and evidence presented and our own Board of Elections data, that the Presidential election held on November 3, 2020, in Pennsylvania is irredeemably corrupted".

=== Editorial response and gubernatorial candidacy predictions ===
In the wake of the events, the editorial board of the York Dispatch, the local newspaper for much of his state senate district, wrote an editorial on December 2 that strongly criticized Mastriano's actions relating to the election. The editorial described him as someone who "regularly spouts his love of freedom" but has a relationship to Trump that had been "exposed as nothing more than a vassal doing his master's bidding", and said his actions were that of a "craven oligarch" making a "shocking call for tyranny" in a "campaign to undercut democracy itself for a generation".

The Philadelphia Inquirer reported on December 5, 2020, that Mastriano's involvement with Trump in disputing the election results had raised his profile, and that he might become a candidate for Governor of Pennsylvania in the 2022 election. The Beaver County Times echoed this view on December 9, saying Mastriano had "shot to the top of the list for the GOP", and quoting local Democratic strategist Mike Mikus as saying Mastriano seemed to be "aggressively angling" to position himself as a potential candidate.

Mastriano published an op-ed article in the York Daily Record on December 11, accusing Pennsylvania Governor Tom Wolf, Secretary Boockvar, and the Supreme Court of Pennsylvania of taking advantage of the COVID-19 pandemic to abuse and contravene Pennsylvania Act 77, an act passed on October 29, 2019, that modified the election laws in Pennsylvania. He said they "have been making up rules on the fly and unconstitutionally rewrote the law, which compromised our election". Mastriano said he had joined two lawsuits seeking to overturn the election results (Texas v. Pennsylvania, which the U.S. Supreme Court dismissed on the same day for lack of standing, and Kelly v. Pennsylvania, a lawsuit brought by Pennsylvania U.S. Representative Mike Kelly, which the U.S. Supreme Court had rejected three days prior to Mastriano's article).

=== Positive COVID-19 test ===
It was reported on November 29 that Mastriano, who had participated in the meeting with Trump, had left the meeting abruptly upon learning that he had tested positive for COVID-19 infection. In addition to Mastriano himself, Mastriano's son and a friend of his son, who also attended the White House meeting, tested positive as well. All participants of the meeting had been administered a rapid test for the virus as part of the White House health protocol, but the results of the test were not provided to them until they were already in the meeting in the West Wing. It was also reported that Mastriano had not worn a mask during the Gettysburg public meeting that day, which had lasted more than four hours, and all but a few of the other participants had also not been wearing masks at the meeting. Some of the participants had ridden in a large van from the Gettysburg meeting to the White House meeting, while Mastriano, his son and his son's friend had driven together in a separate car. Another Pennsylvania state senator, Judy Ward, who sat next to Mastriano during the public meeting he had organized, tested positive for COVID-19 within five days after the meeting. After acknowledging that he had tested positive for the virus on his Facebook page on November 30, Mastriano said that his case was "pretty mild", and he appeared that day on The Eric Metaxas Show, with Donald Trump on the phone, supporting Trump's claim that he had won the election. When asked about his infection by conservative radio commentator Glenn Beck the next day, Mastriano replied, "I'm feeling fantastic."

Interim Pennsylvania Senate President Jake Corman said that "mistakes were made" in the conduct of the Pennsylvania public meeting, as the organizers of the meeting had allowed a large crowd to attend without following guidelines for social distancing and mask-wearing. The meeting participants were also not screened for symptoms of infection. Corman said "There is no penalty, but you have to review what happened, acknowledge that there were mistakes, and make sure there are policies in place so that it doesn't happen again." Pennsylvania political leaders had been warned by federal officials a few days before the meeting that the state had entered the "red zone" for its percentage of positive virus test results, indicating uncontrolled spreading of COVID-19 in the community, and they had been previously warned that the state was also in the "red zone" for the number of confirmed cases per capita in the state population.

After participating in the event organized by Mastriano and several other events elsewhere disputing the validity of the election without wearing a mask, Giuliani tested positive for COVID-19 infection 10 or 11 days after the Pennsylvania meeting.

=== Role in 2021 storming of the United States Capitol ===
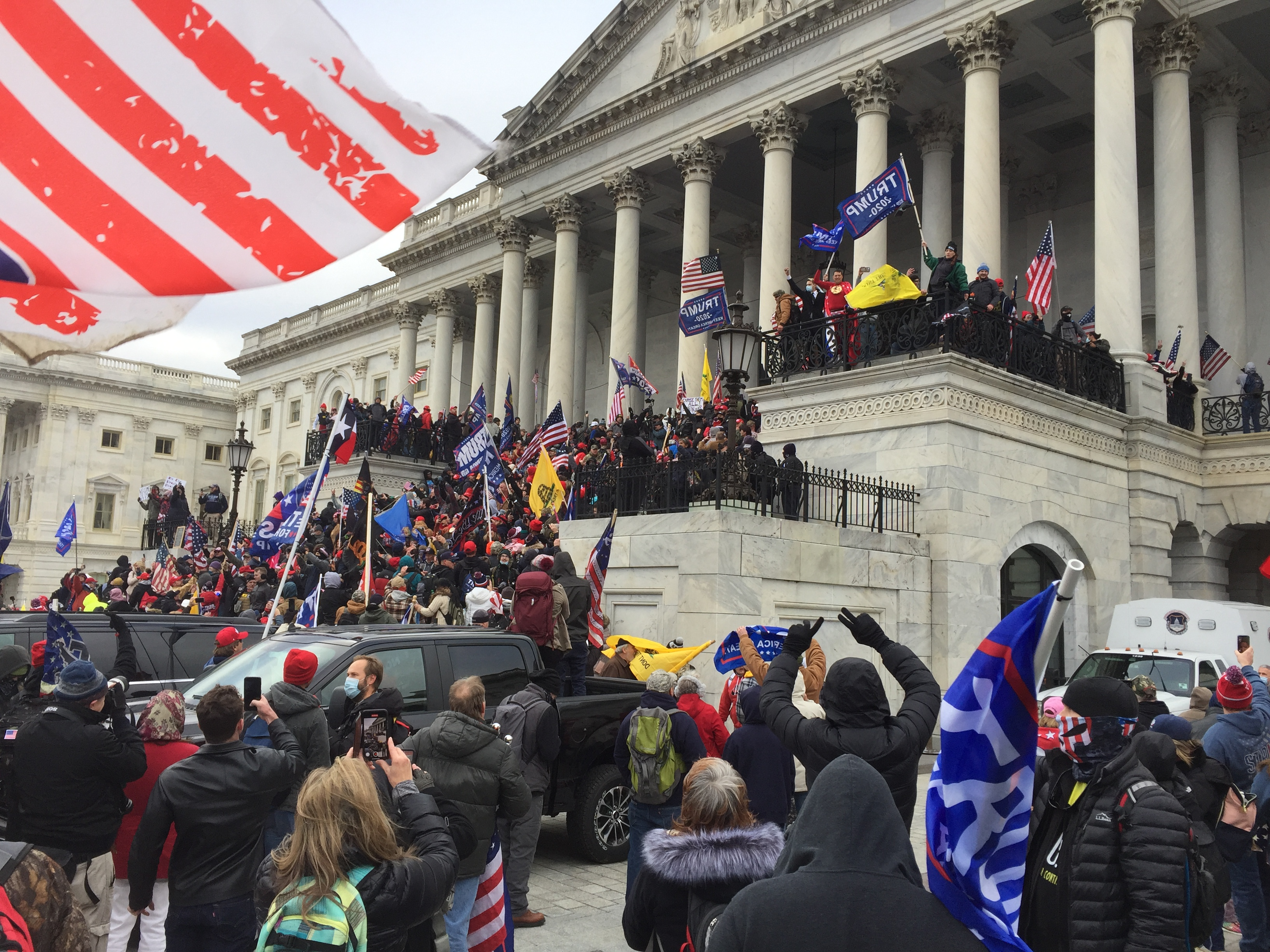
Rioters storming the Capitol in 2021

Mastriano helped organize bus rides for Trump supporters to the protest that preceded the 2021 United States Capitol attack in Washington, D.C. During the protest, Mastriano said he and his wife left the rally area when it turned violent, which he called "unacceptable". Democratic colleagues called for his resignation, saying senators must be held to a higher standard than others. On the morning of January 13, Mastriano wrote on Twitter and Facebook, "Please do not participate in rallies or protests over the next ten days," and "Let's focus on praying for our nation during these troubling times."

In May 2021, crowdsourced video analysis identified Mastriano and his wife watching as another rioter tore a police barricade away and then passing through a breached Capitol Police barricade, contradicting his previous claims that he had not been among the rioters. Mastriano said he was following police directions and dismissed the accusations as the work of "angry partisans" who were "foot soldiers of the ruling elite". This claim is not supported by the video evidence. Mastriano said he was in the "second row, watching the Trump rally", hoping Congress would legally stop the election's certification. "Once I realized all the speaking events were off we left and that's a darn shame... I was there to cheer on Congress, the House and the Senate, not to disrupt it," Mastriano said. No negative consequences were expected as a result of the released videos, according to multiple university political science leaders.

According to CNN, after images of Mastriano outside the Capitol emerged in the summer of 2021, Mastriano fully cooperated when questioned by the FBI. As of July 12, 2022, Mastriano has not been charged with any crimes related to the Capitol breach by the DOJ.

Transcripts released by the January 6th Committee later showed that investigators were aware of Mastriano's attempt to contact Vice President Mike Pence on the day of the attack.

=== Continuing efforts to contest 2020 presidential election results ===
==== Arizona ====
In June 2021, after the inauguration of President Joe Biden, and without invitation, Mastriano traveled to Arizona along with fellow state senator Cris Dush and state house member Rob Kauffman to observe the 2021 Maricopa County presidential ballot audit, which the Maricopa County Board of Supervisors called a "spectacle". The audit was ordered by the state's Republican senate majority, the rationale for which was generated by widely discredited conspiracy theories. Mastriano expressed the desire that the 2020 Pennsylvania ballots be subjected to a process similar to that employed in Maricopa County, Arizona, even though Pennsylvania had already recounted the votes twice and twice confirmed Joe Biden's win and Donald Trump's loss.

The United States Department of Justice warned the audit participants that they may have broken the law in compromising the integrity of those Arizona ballots. One firm involved had previously audited the 2020 election in Pennsylvania. Wake TSI, the business contracted to do the audit in Fulton County, Pennsylvania by a nonprofit group was directed by discredited Trump attorney and conspiracy theorist Sidney Powell, though she and they never found evidence of fraud. Further, Wake reported the Fulton County's count was "well run" and "conducted in a diligent and effective manner", but its conclusions were subsequently altered before being finalized by the county.

==== January 6 attack ====
On February 15, 2022, Mastriano was subpoenaed by the congressional committee investigating the January 6 attack on the U.S. Capitol, reportedly to inquire about his role in trying to impanel a slate of alternative electors in Pennsylvania, in an effort to overturn the 2020 presidential election. He submitted pertinent documents to the committee on May 30, 2022, and agreed to be interviewed. His submissions included receipts for $3,354 for the buses he rented to take his supporters to the January rally that segued into a violent insurrection. He further provided the names of attendees. He sold more than 130 tickets for those buses. Mastriano has compared the actions of the committee as similar to the Nazi Party's crackdown on civil liberties following the Reichstag fire, and making "McCarthy in the '50s look like an amateur". On August 9, 2022, Mastriano was scheduled to testify before the committee in a virtual deposition. But he answered no questions and ended the session after only fifteen minutes, after several disputes were brought up by his lawyer, including Mastriano's request that he be allowed to record his deposition, something the committee denied. The following month Mastriano sued the committee arguing that they did not follow proper procedure and did not have the power to conduct depositions. In 2024, Mastriano was subject to an ethics complaint filed by State Senator Art Haywood. The complaint was based on a report by Citizens for Responsibility and Ethics in Washington (CREW) which outlined Mastriano's involvement in attempts to overturn the election and January 6. CREW's report stated, "There is compelling evidence that Mastriano is disqualified under Section 3 of the 14th Amendment . . . He should be investigated and, if the evidence is substantiated, held accountable by the Pennsylvania Legislature, including possible expulsion from the Chamber."

== 2022 Pennsylvania gubernatorial campaign ==
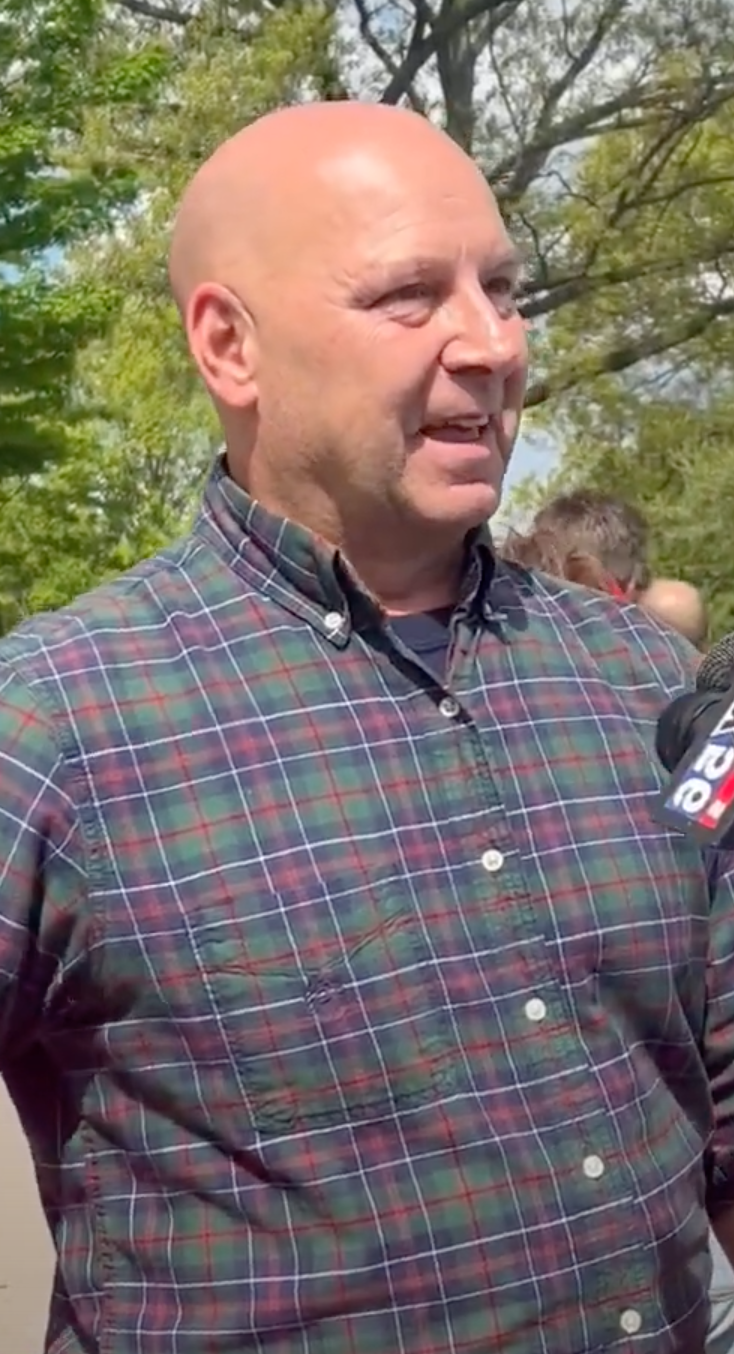
Mastriano campaigning for Governor in Wilkes-Barre in 2022

Mastriano had long been rumored to be considering a bid for Governor of Pennsylvania, particularly following his high-profile role in trying to change the results of the 2020 presidential election. In October 2021, Mastriano said he was considering a run for governor, but was putting out a fleece, and waiting for a sign from God before he could officially announce. He has said that God and former president Donald Trump wanted him to run for governor. On January 8, 2022, Mastriano announced his candidacy as a Republican candidate for governor. Mastriano emerged as an early frontrunner in the race, alongside former Congressman Lou Barletta.

While campaigning, Mastriano often used religious rhetoric. The Philadelphia Inquirer said "Mastriano often invokes Esther, the biblical Jewish queen who saved her people from slaughter by Persians, casting himself and his followers as God's chosen people who have arrived at a crossroads – and who must now defend their country, their very lives." Inquirer reporter Andrew Seidman described his rallies as a "megachurch event". Mastriano's campaign motto "Walk as Free People" was a reference to the Bible verse John 8:36.

In April, Mastriano spoke at and raised money for his campaign at a far-right Christian conference called "Patriots Arise for God and Country" in Gettysburg. The conference promoted conspiracy theories claiming that there is a global cabal of Democrats sex trafficking children, 9/11 was a false flag attack, vaccines amount to genocide therapy and Adolf Hitler faked his death. Jewish organizations criticized Mastriano following the rally due to the improper use of Jewish symbols as "campaign props" to open the event.

Mastriano's campaign had largely avoided talking to media outlets and journalists, instead choosing to directly reach supporters via Facebook and speaking to a few conservative outlets. Reporters from several outlets had been refused entry to his rallies, including reporters from The Philadelphia Inquirer, NBC News, and CNN. A Philadelphia Inquirer reporter said that there were printed-out photographs of him and other journalists at the check-in desk at a Mastriano rally in Lancaster County. Mastriano's campaign also attempted to have two CNN journalists removed from a hotel where they had video equipment set up on a balcony overlooking a rally in Uniontown. The journalists had previously been prevented from being admitted to the rally; they were allowed by the hotel to stay.

On November 8, 2022, Mastriano lost the general election to Pennsylvania Attorney General Josh Shapiro, the Democratic nominee by about 14 percentage points. Mastriano conceded defeat to Shapiro five days after the election while also calling for reforms to Pennsylvania's electoral system. Former Republican senator from Pennsylvania Pat Toomey criticized Mastriano's campaign for its negative effect on Republican congressional races.

=== Platform ===
At a rally on May 7, 2022, Mastriano suggested that his gubernatorial administration would be so conservative that it would make Florida Governor Ron DeSantis look like an "[a]mateur". His platform for governor included prohibiting abortion, expanding gun rights, lowering taxes, and supporting charter schools.

==== Abortion ====
Mastriano is opposed to abortion. He has expressed support for a ban on abortion from conception, saying "I'm at conception. We're going to have to work our way towards that." He opposes exceptions for rape, incest, or the life of the mother. Mastriano has sponsored heartbeat bills, which ban abortions after 6 to 10 weeks. In 2019, Mastriano said women who violated his proposed 10-week abortion ban should be charged with murder. Mastriano has referred to the practice as a "barbaric holocaust" and said that the slogan "my body, my choice" is "ridiculous nonsense". Mastriano has called the Supreme Court's decision in Roe v. Wade, "worse than the Holocaust".

Shapiro has argued that Mastriano's anti-abortion views will cost Pennsylvania business and jobs as some Pennsylvania-based corporations, such as Duolingo, have said they will leave the state if an abortion ban is passed.

==== Christian nationalism ====
An Associated Press article discussing Mastriano's combination of religion and politics said that Mastriano "leads rise in Christian nationalism among GOP candidates" and the article asserted that "watchers of Christian nationalism" considered Mastriano's primary win to be "by far the highest-profile victory for the movement". Republican strategist Mike Madrid told Politico Mastriano's Christian nationalism "is a movement....The [separation] between evangelical Christianity, white identity and American nationalism is basically gone. They're merging into the same thing." Despite being commonly described as a Christian nationalist, Mastriano has rejected this label.

==== Voting restrictions and plan to only certify elections for Republicans ====
Although no evidence of "compromised" voting machines has been found and although pending defamation lawsuits have been brought by both Dominion Voting Systems and Smartmatic Corp against certain defendants who claimed otherwise, Mastriano has said that if he is elected, within his first 100 days he would "immediately end all contracts with compromised voting machine companies". Mastriano seeks to restrict voting. He would repeal Pennsylvania's no-excuse mail voting law, which he previously voted for. As governor, Mastriano would have the power to appoint Pennsylvania's secretary of state, who oversees elections in the state. In April 2022, Mastriano said that his secretary of state would "reset" voter rolls so that Pennsylvanians would have to re-register to vote. He reiterated his intent to do so days after the primary election held on May 17, 2022. According to legal scholars consulted by the Associated Press, such an action would be a clear violation of federal law and may also violate state law and constitutional protections as well. At a 2022 campaign event, Mastriano suggested that he might only certify Pennsylvania's election results if the Republican candidate for president wins.

==== Disbelief in climate change ====
Mastriano supports pulling Pennsylvania out of the Regional Greenhouse Gas Initiative, a market-based program to reduce greenhouse gas emissions to combat climate change. Dismissing the extensively documented scientific consensus that humans are dangerously interfering with the climate system, Mastriano justified his opposition to the initiative by claiming climate change is "just a theory" based on "pop science" while "the weatherman can't get the weather right 24 hours out." In a 2018 radio interview with WEEO-FM, Mastriano said that climate science is a "fake science. And it's a racket at the academic level."

==== Education plan and school funding cuts ====
On the issue of education, Mastriano has called for cuts to funding of public education and proposed reducing per-student school funding from $19,000 to about $9,000. The Pennsylvania State Education Association analyzed Mastriano's education plan and determined it would "amount to a school funding cut of $12.75 billion and could likely lead to the loss of more than 118,000 jobs in public schools in Pennsylvania..." He supports school vouchers that could be used at any school including charter and religious schools.

During an October 2022 rally, Mastriano said, if elected governor, that "the sexualization of our kids, pole dancing, and all this other crap that's going on will be forbidden in our schools."

==== Illegal immigration ====
Mastriano supports removing all undocumented immigrants living in Pennsylvania. He has said he supports busing them to Wilmington, Delaware, the hometown of President Joe Biden.

==== LGBTQ+ rights ====
Mastriano has said that same-sex marriage should be illegal, and that same-sex parents should not be allowed to adopt children. On Mastriano's campaign page for the Pennsylvania Senate, he says that "marriage is between a man and woman – and that no amount of disinformation or political correctness will change these facts".

Mastriano opposes efforts to ban or discourage conversion therapy, a pseudoscientific practice of attempting to change an individual's sexual orientation. He has called efforts to discourage the practice as "disgusting" saying the practice can be used to cure children who are "confused".

He supports legislation to ban gender transition surgeries for transgender children. He has described the procedures as "experimental medical procedures" that distort "the concept of gender so that it defies the bounds of science and logic". In October 2022, Mastriano, without evidence, accused the Children's Hospital of Philadelphia of "grabbing homeless kids and kids in foster care, apparently, and experimenting on them with gender transitioning...".

=== Republican primary ===
In the closing days of the primary election, Mastriano led in most polls, much to the dismay of the Pennsylvania Republican establishment, who believed Mastriano would lose the general election to the presumptive Democratic nominee, Attorney General Josh Shapiro. A number of candidates including President pro tempore of the Pennsylvania Senate Jake Corman and former Congresswoman Melissa Hart dropped out and endorsed Lou Barletta, in a bid to stop Mastriano. Three days before the election former president Donald Trump endorsed Mastriano. Mastriano won the Republican primary election with 44% of the vote.

During the lead-up to the primary, Shapiro's campaign released a televised advertisement stating that a Mastriano win is "a win for what Donald Trump stands for". The ad was labeled as promoting Mastriano, a candidate Democrats saw as being easier to defeat in the general election.

An investigation by Media Matters for America reported that Mastriano paid $5,000 to the Gab social network service on April 28, 2022, for "campaign consulting". As a result of the payments, every new account on Gab automatically followed Mastriano's account. Gab has been described as a social media haven for white supremacists and neo-Nazis. Gab co-founder and CEO Andrew Torba has a history of antisemitic comments and associations with white supremacists. Torba said, "This is the most important election of the 2022 midterms because Doug is an outspoken Christian. We are going to build a coalition of Christian nationalists, of Christians, of Christian candidates, at the state, local and federal levels and we're going to take this country back for the glory of God." Torba added, "My policy is not to conduct interviews with reporters who aren't Christian or with outlets who aren't Christian and Doug has a very similar media strategy where he does not do interviews with these people. He does not talk to these people. He does not give press access to these people." After his ties to Gab were revealed, Mastriano distanced himself from the social platform following criticism and said he rejects antisemitism. His Gab account was also removed on July 28. Mastriano has said that he is not antisemitic because his campaign has had Jewish symbols, including the tallit and shofar, at one of their rallies. Some Jewish organizations, however, have criticized Mastriano for the use of Jewish symbols at his campaign events. The man at the rally, who presented the Jewish symbols, was identified as "Pastor Don" and is a messianic Jew.

=== General election ===
Mastriano faced Pennsylvania Attorney General Josh Shapiro in the November 8, 2022 general election, and lost by 14.8%. The New York Times described Mastriano's general election efforts as a "ragtag campaign" that had "no television ads on the air [after] May, [chose] not to interact with the state's news media in ways that would push his agenda, and trail[ed] by double digits in reputable public polling..." Matt Brouillette, a Pennsylvania Republican strategist, said of Mastriano's campaign, "I've not seen anything that is even a semblance of a campaign."

In July 2022, the Anti-Defamation League (ADL), a Jewish civil rights organization, condemned Mastriano's "politics that teeter on the edge of a kind of extremism". In August, Mastriano was placed on their list of "right-wing extremists" seeking elected office and once again condemned by the ADL after spreading debunked, antisemitic, conspiracy theories that George Soros, a Jewish liberal businessman, was a Nazi.

In August 2022, Mastriano condemned the FBI search of Mar-a-Lago, the residence of former president Trump, as "an outrageous weaponization of America's tools of justice against political opponents of the current regime in Washington, DC". He urged his supporters "to exercise their votes and throw the bums out – Democrats in Washington and Harrisburg".

Mastriano faced accusations of antisemitism in September 2022 following comments he made regarding Shapiro, who is Jewish. Mastriano said that Shapiro cannot relate to voters because he grew up "in a privileged neighborhood" and attended a "privileged, exclusive, elite school", which therefore means Shapiro has "disdain for people like us". Shapiro's alma mater in question is Jack M. Barrack Hebrew Academy (then Akiba Hebrew Academy), a Jewish day school. Mastriano also critiqued Shapiro for sending his kids to a Jewish day school. A number of figures, including Jake Tapper, a CNN journalist and fellow alumnus of Shapiro's school, condemned the remarks as antisemitic. Tapper said: "I don't think I have ever heard Mr. Mastriano describe any other Pennsylvania parochial school in that way." A school official said that more than 60% of students receive financial aid. Responding to Tapper, Mastriano said the "irony was listening to Jake Tapper, one of his classmates, defend the elite school they go to. 'I'm not elitist' — it's like Nixon saying 'I'm not a criminal.' Yes, you are elitist." Mastriano has continued to use the line of attack saying "[apparently] now it is some kind of racist thing if I talk about the school..." Mastriano's wife, Rebbie, defended the comments saying "we probably love Israel more than a lot of Jews do", citing years of outreach contributions.

Towards the end of the summer, Shapiro's lead over Mastriano began to grow in the polls and Mastriano's campaign lacked the funding to run many ads on TV. The Philadelphia Inquirer reported that Mastriano's "messaging has grown increasingly erratic, sometimes arguably bordering on nonsensical". Forty days prior to the general election, Mastriano called on his supporters to join him for a fast that would last until election day.

In October, in a rare move, two retired U.S. Army War College professors publicly rebuked Mastriano and said he was unfit to serve as governor.

One week before the general election, acting Pennsylvania Secretary of State Leigh M. Chapman announced the total vote count would take "days". Mastriano falsely claimed this was "an attempt to have the fix in". After the election had been called for Shapiro, Mastriano initially did not concede. Five days after the election was called for Shapiro, Mastriano formally conceded the race without issue.

==== Ties to far-right extremists and militias ====
During an Independence Day parade, supporters of Mastriano could be seen carrying a flag bearing the emblem of the Three Percenters, a far-right anti-government militia that has been labeled as an extremist organization by the Southern Poverty Law Center.

A July 2022 article in Salon, expanded upon by Media Matters for America in August, found that Mastriano has campaigned with and promoted Julie Green, an acknowledged prophet in the New Apostolic Reformation. Green, who says she has "a special relationship" with Mastriano and gave the opening prayer at one of Mastriano's campaign events, has promoted conspiracy theories including that Nancy Pelosi "loves to drink the little children's blood" and that Joe Biden is actually dead and being played by an actor. Green has prophesied that a number of politicians including Liz Cheney, Doug Ducey, Mitch McConnell, Jerry Nadler, Mitt Romney and Chuck Schumer will be executed for treason.

An August 2022 investigation by LNP found that Mastriano's security detail was made up of non-professional, armed guards including the former regional leader of the Oath Keepers, a far-right extremist militia group. Several other members of the security detail are members of LifeGate, an Elizabethtown-based evangelical church, whose leaders have spoken publicly about their goals to elect Christians to public office to advance biblical principles in government.

At a September 2022 rally in Chambersburg, a speaker directed the crowd to raise their hands in unison and then to bring their hands down on the count of three. The crowd shouted "as one" as they lowered their hands. The gesture was described as being "eerily similar" to a Nazi salute. The Texas evangelist who directed the unison activity said he is part Jewish and that the salute comparison was "typical leftist lies" about a Republican event.

In October 2022, Mastriano appeared at a campaign rally with conspiracy theorist Jack Posobiec. Posobiec has repeatedly used white supremacist and antisemitic talking points, including the Fourteen Words, a reference to a white supremacist slogan.

In November 2022, The Daily Beast reported that Mastriano was an administrator for a Facebook group, which features a number of racist and antisemitic posts. The page features posts stating that Michelle Obama is transgender, George Soros is a Jewish puppet master who controls politicians and that immigrants are "scary brown people".

At least six people who were in Washington, D.C., on January 6, 2021, during the Capitol attack have donated to Mastriano's campaign. He also received a $500 donation from Andrew Torba, a white supremacist and Christian nationalist.

==== Confederate uniform controversy ====
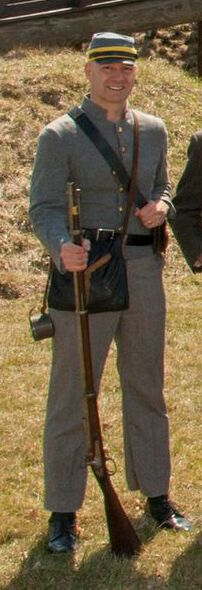
Mastriano pictured in a Confederate uniform, adapted from Army War College faculty photograph

In late August 2022, Reuters obtained a photograph via a FOIA request showing Mastriano dressed in a Confederate uniform while posing in a 2013–14 faculty portrait for the Army War College. The photo was taken at the U.S. Army Heritage and Education Center along the Army Heritage Trail. According to Reuters, the faculty was permitted to dress in historical attire. At least 15 of the 21 people in the picture chose to wear regular attire. One man in the photograph could be seen wearing an aviator's helmet while another wore a trench coat. Mastriano was the only member photographed wearing Confederate attire.

After the report was published, the photo was removed from the Army War College's collection of portraits "because it does not meet AWC values"; a spokesperson for the Army noted that "the Army supports commanders who remove symbols or images that do not comport with Army values." According to Reuters, "Confederate symbols can be seen as insensitive to those who view them as painful reminders of racial oppression" and "Confederate symbols and dress have been embraced by white supremacists in the United States."

Following the controversy, Media Matters for America published a Facebook livestream from Mastriano in 2020 where he praised armed men, who were ostensibly defending a statue of Confederate General Robert E. Lee in Gettysburg National Park. In the video, Mastriano says "Friends, thanks for being here. I'm Senator Mastriano ... It's good to see you guys ... Thanks for being vigilant." In another part of the video, Mastriano says to a man wearing a half-Confederate, half-U.S. flag: "You're looking good there, man. I can't think of a better cape."

== Published works as author ==
=== Alvin York: A New Biography of the Hero of the Argonne ===
Mastriano's first book, Alvin York: A New Biography of the Hero of the Argonne (ISBN 978-0813145198), was published by the University Press of Kentucky in 2014. Mastriano conducted twelve years of research for the book. His team uncovered thousands of artifacts that Mastriano believed were related to Alvin York's battle of October 8, 1918.

Mastriano's book received the 2015 William E. Colby Award of the William E. Colby Military Writers' Symposium at Norwich University (an award for a first published work of a military topic author), the Army Historical Foundation Award, the US Army War College Madigan Award and the 2015 Crader Family Book Prize in American Values.

Other researchers have questioned the accuracy of the book, including James Gregory, a PhD Candidate at the University of Oklahoma, who has identified 30 citations in the work that he asserts are fraudulent (i.e., not supporting the claims they are cited to support or having obviously doubtful reliability), and a photo on the dust jacket that is labeled by the Army as having been taken twelve days before York's Medal of Honor action but is presented as depicting the action's aftermath. The University Press of Kentucky, which published the book, asked Mastriano in September to respond before November 2021 to about 30 items of concern; his response or the publisher's own recommendations were then to be reviewed by the publisher and a peer reviewer for inclusion in a new printing in 2022.

Several archeologists and historians have raised questions about Mastriano's findings regarding the location of Alvin York's Medal of Honor actions. In an introduction to Michael Kelly's Hero on the Western Front: Discovering Alvin York's Battlefield, the late Ed Bearss, former chief historian for the National Park Service, says that Kelly "identifies serious problems with [Mastriano's York Group] that compromise the validity of their claims that they had located the York sites".

Brad Posey, who had initially been a member of Mastriano's team, described Mastriano as "A U.S. Army or Air Force officer using a very cheap-looking metal detector with no experience in metal detecting". Posey left Mastriano's team after becoming convinced that Mastriano was incorrect, and joined the competing Nolan group. Lieutenant Col. Taylor V. Beattie, an Alvin York researcher, was critical of Mastriano's lack of annotation during his research, saying, "This is actually one of the things I warned Mastriano about. Somebody should be able to retrace what he did." Beattie later criticized Mastriano's team for using a bulldozer to make room for a monument, rendering any further archaeological investigation impossible.

=== Other works ===
Other works by Mastriano include:

- Thunder in the Argonne: A New History of America's Greatest Battle (ISBN 978-0813175553)
- Project 1704: U.S. Army War College Analysis of Russian Strategy in Eastern Europe, Appropriate U.S. Response, and Implications for U.S. Landpower – Putin's Rise to Power, Military, Ukraine Crisis, as project leader for a U.S. Army War College project, 2017
- Project 1721: A U.S. Army War College Assessment on Russian Strategy in Eastern Europe and Recommendations on How to Leverage Landpower to Maintain the Peace, as project leader for a U.S. Army War College project, 2017
- Project 1704: A U.S. Army War College Analysis of Russian Strategy in Eastern Europe, an Appropriate U.S. Response, and the Implications for U.S. Landpower, as project leader for a U.S. Army War College project, 2015
- Nebuchadnezzar's Sphinx: What Have We Learned from Baghdad's Plan to Take Kuwait?, a thesis for the School of Advanced Air Power Studies, Air University, Maxwell Air Force Base, Montgomery, Alabama, June 2002
- The Civilian Putsch of 2018: Debunking The Myth of a Civil-Military Leadership Rift, a research report for the School of Advanced Air Power Studies, Air University, Maxwell Air Force Base, Montgomery, Alabama, April 2001

== Personal life ==
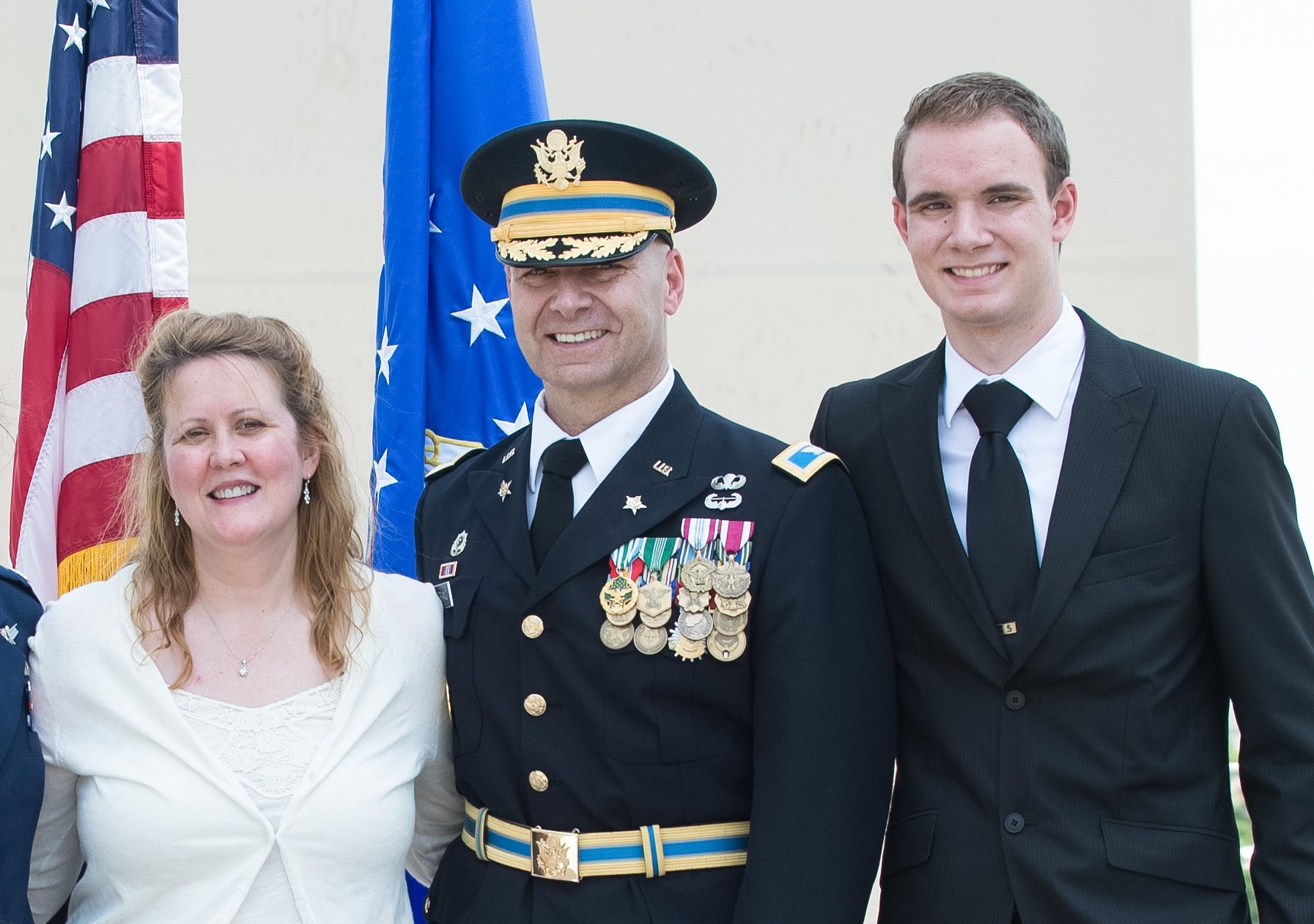
Mastriano (center) with his wife Rebbie and son Josiah in 2018

Mastriano grew up in Mercer County, New Jersey and voted in New Jersey until 2010. In 2012, he moved to Pennsylvania. Mastriano's mother Janice was a member of the East Windsor Regional Board of Education for three terms. She faced calls for her resignation in 2000 after saying in an interview "I wouldn't want a known homosexual camping with my boys, because you know most of them are pedophiles too."

Mastriano and his wife, Rebecca, have one child. Both he and his son Josiah appeared in the 2019 film Operation Resist, a film The New Yorker described as historically revisionist for its presentation of Evangelical Christians as a persecuted minority in Nazi Germany alongside Jews. The film has also been criticized by scholars for its distortions of the Holocaust, and for equating abortion and gun-control with Nazism. Josiah played the role of the Nazi Fritz and Mastriano played the role of American Captain Peter Ortiz.

He worships at a Mennonite church, likely a Conservative Mennonite Conference church. Mastriano has attended events of the New Apostolic Reformation, a movement advocating the restoration of the offices of so-called "prophets and apostles".

== Electoral history ==
2018 Pennsylvania's 13th Congressional District, 2018 Republican Primary
Party	Candidate	Votes	%
Republican	John Joyce	14,615	21.9
Republican	John Eichelberger	13,101	19.6
Republican	Steve Bloom	12,195	18.3
Republican	Doug Mastriano	10,485	15.7
Republican	Art Halvorson	10,161	15.2
Republican	Travis Schooley	3,030	4.5
Republican	Bernie Washabaugh	1,908	2.9
Republican	Ben Hornberger	1,182	1.8
Total votes		66,677	100.0

2019 Pennsylvania Senate special election, District 33
Party	Candidate	Votes	%
Republican	Doug Mastriano	20,595	68.29
Democratic	Sarah E. Hammond	9,490	31.47
Write-in		73	0.24
Total votes		30,158	100.00

2020 Pennsylvania Senate election, District 33
Party	Candidate	Votes	%
Republican	Doug Mastriano	96,029	68.64
Democratic	Rich Sterner	43,867	31.36
Total votes		139,896	100.00

2022 Pennsylvania gubernatorial election, Republican Primary
Party	Candidate	Votes	%
Republican	Doug Mastriano	590,703	43.8
Republican	Lou Barletta	272,884	20.2
Republican	William McSwain	212,536	15.8
Republican	Dave White	128,885	9.6
Republican	Melissa Hart	54,307	4.0
Republican	Joe Gale	27,756	2.1
Republican	Jake Corman	25,903	1.9
Republican	Charlie Gerow	17,829	1.3
Republican	Nche Zama	16,111	1.2
Total votes		1,346,914	100.0

2022 Pennsylvania gubernatorial election
Party	Candidate	Votes	%
Democratic	Josh Shapiro; Austin Davis	3,031,137	56.49
Republican	Doug Mastriano; Carrie DelRosso	2,238,477	41.71
Libertarian	Matt Hackenburg; Tim McMaster	51,611	0.96
Green	Christina DiGiulio; Michael Bagdes-Canning	24,436	0.46
Keystone	Joe Soloski; Nicole Shultz	20,518	0.38
Total votes		5,366,179	100.00

2024 Pennsylvania Senate election, District 33
Party	Candidate	Votes	%
Republican	Doug Mastriano (incumbent)	98,071	69.02
Democratic	Cameron Schroy	44,016	30.98
Total votes		142,087	100.00

Party political offices
Preceded by Scott Wagner	Republican nominee for Governor of Pennsylvania; 2022	Succeeded by Stacy Garrity
