= Bob Guzzardi =

American lawyer

Robert Richard Guzzardi (born 1944) is an American attorney, real estate developer, conservative financier, and political activist. He is best known for his efforts to elect "reform Republican" candidates to the Pennsylvania General Assembly after the 2005 Pennsylvania General Assembly pay raise controversy.

== Personal life and career ==
He graduated from Saint Joseph's Preparatory School in 1963. He earned a degree in philosophy from Georgetown University in 1966 and earned a Juris Doctor degree from Temple University School of Law in 1970.

Guzzardi worked as a real estate attorney and founded Chancellor Properties, Inc. to manage several rental properties in Center City, Philadelphia. By 2006, he had sold most of his interests in these properties.

He has served on the boards of Middle East Forum, Jewish Institute for National Security Affairs, Zionist Organization of America, Dollars for Scholars and Yorktown University in Colorado.

== 12th Street Gym ==
In 2006, Guzzardi's financial support of conservative Pennsylvania Senator Rick Santorum, who became known for lack of support for gay rights, became an issue with the clientele of his 12th Street Gym, which was known for being one of Philadelphia's "most gay-friendly establishments." The gym's business manager noted that all of the money donated to Santorum came from Guzzadi's personal account and not from the gym's business accounts. Guzzardi maintained that he supported Santorum on such issues as Israel, and not his social stance.

In April 2006, Guzzardi liquidates his holding in the gym, selling it to his business partner, to avoid a growing protest from the LGBT community.

== Political activity and financing in 2006-2010 ==
Following the 2005 Pennsylvania General Assembly pay raise controversy, Guzzardi began financing a large number of "reform" candidates to run against a number of incumbent legislators in the 2006 General Assembly election. He heavily supported two primary challenges against the two Republican Leaders in the Pennsylvania Senate, Chip Brightbill and Robert Jubelirer. He targeted Republican Speaker of the Pennsylvania House of Representatives John Perzel by supporting candidates, both Republicans and Democrats, who were likely to vote against Perzel for Speaker.

=== Mike Folmer ===
Guzzardi was an early and significant force in recruiting and funding tire salesman Mike Folmer's challenge to Chip Brightbill in the Republican primary for the 48th senatorial district in the Pennsylvania Senate. Guzzardi's support of Folmer became a campaign issue when Brightbill accused the two of running a "stealth Democrat campaign", because of Folmer's past Democratic voter registration and Guzzardi's past support of Democratic candidates. Brightbill noted that Guzzardi had donated financially to Ed Rendell, John F. Street, Bob Casey, Jr. in the past.

Guzzardi told the Intelligencer Journal that Folmer's challenge to Brightbill was "viable now ...because of the pay-jacking and because of people like me. I just happen to be one of those guys who happens to have a little bit of money, and is interested in good government." In the May 2006 primary election, Folmer defeated Brightbill in one of the largest upsets in Pennsylvania electoral history.

=== John Eichelberger ===
In October 2005, Guzzardi sponsored two public opinion polls in the 30th senatorial district to gauge the damage that the pay raise had done to longtime Republican Senator Robert Jubelirer. The unflattering poll results showed Jubelirer's weakness and caused reporter Dimitri Vassilaros to call Guzzardi "Jubelirer's worst nightmare" and attracted potential candidates to a race that had seemed un-winnable. Guzzardi became a strong financial supporter of John Eichelberger, who successfully challenged Jubelirer in the Republican primary.

=== Unseating John Perzel ===
Because Perzel occupied an invincible seat, a direct challenger was not feasible. Instead, Guzzardi set out to unseat John Perzel from his Speakership by funding State House candidates of both parties that would refuse to vote for him in the Speaker election. He spent over $100,000 of his own money in this effort. Perzel's staff claimed this effort was illegal and threatened to have the Pennsylvania Attorney General investigate Guzzardi.

Following the election, Guzzardi and his newly elected allies hoped to split enough Republican votes for an alternative reform-minded candidate to deny Perzel the speakership and to elect Bill DeWeese, who would have to deal with a "reform wing" for him to deal with.

The plan worked, denying the speakership to Perzel when six Republicans and the entire Democratic caucus voted for Republican Dennis M. O'Brien once it became clear that neither Perzel nor DeWeese had enough votes to win the speakership. O'Brien adopted several of the "reform Republicans'" proposals, including major changes in open records, leading to a new open records law in Pennsylvania.

Guzzardi was invited to testify before the Speaker's Commission of Reform.

== 2014 Pennsylvania gubernatorial race ==
On March 10, 2014, it was announced that Guzzardi had acquired enough signatures on nominating petitions to face Pennsylvania governor Tom Corbett in the May 20 Republican primary. However, Guzzardi failed to file a statement of financial interests as required by law, after being told by an employee of the State Department that it was unnecessary. Four Republicans, backed by the state Republican Party, sued to have him removed from the ballot. The case reached the state Supreme Court which ordered that Guzzardi's name be struck from the ballot.
