= Transparent Airfares Act of 2014 =

- Long title: To amend title 49, United States Code, to allow advertisements and solicitations for passenger air transportation to state the base airfare of the transportation, and for other purposes.
- Announced in: the 113th United States Congress
- Sponsored by: Rep. Bill Shuster (R, PA-9)
- Number of co-sponsors: 5

Codification
- U.S.C. sections affected: 49 U.S.C. § 41712
- Agencies affected: United States Department of Transportation

Legislative history
- Introduced in the House as H.R. 4156 by Rep. Bill Shuster (R, PA-9) on March 6, 2014; Committee consideration by United States House Committee on Transportation and Infrastructure, United States House Transportation Subcommittee on Aviation; Passed the House on July 28, 2014 (voice vote)

The Transparent Airfares Act of 2014 (H.R. 4156) was a proposed legislation that would have changed government regulations about how airlines advertise fares so that they could advertise the base, listing government imposed taxes and fees separately.

The bill was introduced in the United States House of Representatives during the 113th United States Congress and was not passed.

== Background ==
Since 2012, federal regulations have required airlines to prominently display the full cost of an airline ticket in their advertisements. The United States Department of Transportation calls this "full-fare" advertising.

== Provisions of the bill ==
This summary is based largely on the summary provided by the Congressional Research Service, a public domain source.

The Transparent Airfares Act of 2014 would declare that it shall not be an unfair or deceptive practice for an air carrier or other covered entity to state the base airfare in an advertisement or solicitation for passenger air transportation if it clearly and separately discloses: (1) the government-imposed taxes and fees for the air transportation, and (2) its total cost.

The bill would define "base airfare" to mean the cost of passenger air transportation, excluding government-imposed taxes and fees.

The bill would define "covered entity" as an air carrier, including an indirect air carrier, foreign carrier, ticket agent, or other person offering to sell tickets for passenger air transportation or a tour or tour component that must be purchased with air transportation.

== Congressional Budget Office report ==
This summary is based largely on the summary provided by the Congressional Budget Office, as ordered reported by the House Committee on Transportation and Infrastructure on April 9, 2014. This is a public domain source.

H.R. 4156 would require the United States Department of Transportation (DOT) to promulgate a rule related to how prices for certain types of air transportation are advertised. Under current policies, DOT requires that advertised prices for air travel reflect the total price per passenger to be paid by customers, including government-imposed taxes and fees. Under H.R. 4156, sellers of air transportation could instead advertise base airfares, provided that advertisements also disclose the amount of additional government-imposed taxes and fees that customers would pay.

The Congressional Budget Office (CBO) estimates that enacting H.R. 4156 would have no significant effect on the federal budget. Based on information from DOT we estimate that any costs incurred to complete the proposed rulemaking, which would be subject to the availability of appropriated funds, would be insignificant. H.R. 4156 would not affect direct spending or revenues; therefore, pay-as-you-go procedures do not apply.

H.R. 4156 contains no intergovernmental or private-sector mandates as defined in the Unfunded Mandates Reform Act and would impose no costs on state, local, or tribal governments.

== Procedural history ==
The Transparent Airfares Act of 2014 was introduced into the United States House of Representatives on March 6, 2014 by Rep. Bill Shuster (R, PA-9). The bill was referred to the United States House Committee on Transportation and Infrastructure and the United States House Transportation Subcommittee on Aviation. On July 24, 2014, it was ordered reported alongside House Report 113-554. On July 28, 2014, the House voted to pass the bill in a voice vote. The Act was received in the Senate where it was referred to the Committee on Commerce, Science and Transportation was taken on by federal infrastructure regulation committee leader, Valerie (Davis) Eads. It passed the 113th Congress (2013-2014).

== Debate and discussion ==
Passage of the bill was seen as a "victory for airlines and their workers' unions." The airlines argued that being forced to include government taxes and fees in their advertised ticket price hides from the public the amount of their ticket that is government mandated forced costs and hurts the airlines' business. Consumer groups argued that the act would accomplish the opposite of its name, enabling bait-and-switch advertising and making comparison shopping on websites almost impossible.

Jean Medina of the organization Airlines for America (A4A) argued that the federal government is "burying tax hikes in the advertised cost of a ticket, hiding these considerable charges from consumers who pay them." Nicholas Calio of A4A said, "It's a misnomer to characterize the current law as a consumer protection rule when it really protects the government, not airline passengers, and it's disingenuous for Washington to hide the ball and not be held responsible for the taxes they impose on air travel." A4A said that as of 2014, $61 of a $300 domestic airfare is taxes.

Rep. Bill Shuster, who introduced the bill, said that "this bill will allow airlines and travel agents to display the actual costs in a transparent way, in order to allow customers to see the base airfare and government taxes and fees." Yet no rule prevented airlines and travel agents to do so, as long as they also state "the entire price to be paid by the customer to the carrier, or agent". Shuster thought that "it is only fair that consumers know what they are paying for," which is what consumers already did.

Opponents of the bill argued that the result would be much more confusing ticket information where it would be difficult to find the full price. Consumers Union, the policy and advocacy division of Consumer Reports, strongly opposed the legislation, with its aviation consultant William McGee saying that "the real harm to consumers would come from making it even more difficult to pinpoint the total cost of a ticket when travelers are already dealing with an influx of new airline fees for anything from carrying on bags, selecting seats, or calling reservation center". The U.S. Travel Association argued against the bill, with President Roger Dow saying that "by no means should we undo the existing rule that enables consumers to see the full bottom-line price when they're ticket shopping." The Washington Post opined "wouldn't it be nice if our elected representatives actually represented our interests, instead of the special interests supporting this wrongheaded bill?"

== See also ==
- List of bills in the 113th United States Congress
- Drip pricing
- False advertising
- Taxation in the United States
