= Pennsylvania House of Representatives, District 77 =

American legislative district

Pennsylvania's 77th State House of Representatives district
Representative
Scott Conklin; D–Rush Township, Centre County
- Population (2022): 61,876

The 77th Pennsylvania House of Representatives District is located in central Pennsylvania and has been represented since 2007 by Scott Conklin.

== District profile ==
The 77th District is entirely located within Centre County and includes the following areas:

- Ferguson Township (PART, District Northeast)
- Halfmoon Township
- Huston Township
- Patton Township
- Philipsburg
- Port Matilda
- Rush Township
- Taylor Township
- State College (part)
  - District East Central (part)
    - Division 02
  - District Northwest, South (part)
    - Division 01
  - District West and West Central
- Worth Township

== Representatives ==
Representative	Party	Years	District home	Note
Prior to 1969, seats were apportioned by county.
Eugene M. Fulmer	Republican	1969 – 1970		
Galen E. Dreibelbis	Democrat	1971 – 1976		
Helen D. Wise	Democrat	1977 – 1978		
Gregg L. Cunningham	Republican	1979 – 1982		
Lynn B. Herman	Republican	1983 – 2006		
Scott Conklin	Democrat	2007 – present	Rush Township	Incumbent

== Recent election results ==
PA House election, 2024: Pennsylvania House, District 77
Party	Candidate	Votes	%
Democratic	Scott Conklin (incumbent)	18,548	61.36
Republican	Marie Librizzi	11,682	38.64
Total votes		30,230	100.00
Democratic hold			

PA House election, 2022: Pennsylvania House, District 77
Party	Candidate	Votes	%
Democratic	Scott Conklin (incumbent)	14,851	62.26
Republican	Steve Yetsko	9,003	37.74
Total votes		23,854	100.00
Democratic hold			

PA House election, 2020: Pennsylvania House, District 77
Party	Candidate	Votes	%
Democratic	Scott Conklin (incumbent)	14,290	65.81
Republican	Steve Yetsko	7,424	34.19
Total votes		21,714	100.00
Democratic hold			

PA House election, 2018: Pennsylvania House, District 77
Party	Candidate	Votes	%
Democratic	Scott Conklin (incumbent)	Unopposed	
Total votes		14,996	100.00
Democratic hold			

PA House election, 2016: Pennsylvania House, District 77
Party	Candidate	Votes	%
Democratic	Scott Conklin (incumbent)	Unopposed	
Total votes		25,387	100.00
Democratic hold			
