= Howard Coble Coast Guard and Maritime Transportation Act of 2014 =

- Long title: To authorize appropriations for the Coast Guard for fiscal years 2015, and for other purposes.
- Nicknames: Howard Coble Coast Guard and Maritime Transportation Act of 2014
- Announced in: the 113th United States Congress

Codification
- U.S.C. sections affected: 14 U.S.C. § 57, 14 U.S.C. § 93, 46 U.S.C. § 3316, 46 U.S.C. § 80301, 14 U.S.C. § 194, and others.
- Agencies affected: Office of the Vice President of the United States, United States Maritime Administration, United States Department of Justice, International Maritime Organization, United States House of Representatives, Executive Office of the President, United States Congress, United States Department of Commerce, United States Coast Guard, United States Department of Transportation, Federal Maritime Commission, Department of Homeland Security, United States Senate
- Authorizations of appropriations: $8,728,791,000 for each of fiscal years 2015 and 2016

Legislative history
- Introduced in the Senate as S. 2444 by Sen. Mark Begich (D-AK) on June 5, 2014; Committee consideration by United States House Committee on Transportation and Infrastructure, United States House Transportation Subcommittee on Coast Guard and Maritime Transportation

The Howard Coble Coast Guard and Maritime Transportation Act of 2014 (Pub. L. 113–281 (text) (PDF), formerly S. 2444) is a statute of the United States that governs the activities of the United States Coast Guard (USCG), the Maritime Administration (MARAD) within the Department of Transportation, and the Federal Maritime Commission (FMC). The bill also would authorize appropriations totaling about $17.5 billion, primarily for ongoing USCG operations over the 2015-2016 period.

The Act was introduced during the 113th United States Congress, passed the Senate and House on December 10, 2014, and was signed into law on December 18, 2014. Related bills from the U.S. House of Representatives include H.R. 4005 and H.R. 5769.

== Background ==
The United States Coast Guard (USCG) is a branch of the United States Armed Forces and one of the country's eight uniformed services. The Coast Guard is a maritime, military, multi-mission service unique among the U.S. military branches for having a maritime law enforcement mission (with jurisdiction in both domestic and international waters) and a federal regulatory agency mission as part of its mission set. It operates under the U.S. Department of Homeland Security during peacetime, and can be transferred to the U.S. Department of the Navy by the U.S. president at any time, or by the U.S. Congress during times of war. To date, this has happened twice, in 1917 and 1941, during World War I and World War II, respectively.

Today, the United States Coast Guard carries out three basic roles, which are further subdivided into eleven statutory missions. The three roles are Maritime safety, Maritime security, and Maritime stewardship. The Coast Guard has eleven statutory missions, defined by law, that are divided into homeland security missions and non-homeland security (or legacy) missions. The Coast Guard's legacy missions include: Marine safety, search and rescue, aids to navigation, living marine resources (fisheries law enforcement), marine environmental protection, and ice operations. The Coast Guard's Homeland security missions include: Ports, waterways, and coastal security (PWCS); drug interdiction; migrant interdiction; defense readiness; and other law enforcement.

== Provisions of the act ==
A summary of provisions of the Act is available on the Congress.gov website.

== Congressional Budget Office report ==
This summary is based largely on the summary provided by the Congressional Budget Office, as ordered reported by the House Committee on Transportation and Infrastructure on February 11, 2014. This is a public domain source.

The Act amended the laws that govern the activities of the United States Coast Guard (USCG), the Maritime Administration (MARAD) within the Department of Transportation, and the Federal Maritime Commission (FMC). The bill also would authorize appropriations totaling about $17.5 billion, primarily for ongoing USCG operations over the 2015-2016 period, and would increase the amount of food aid required to be shipped on vessels registered in the United States. Assuming appropriation of the specified and necessary amounts, the Congressional Budget Office (CBO) estimates that implementing the legislation would cost $16.8 billion over the 2015-2019 period.

Pay-as-you-go procedures do not apply to this legislation because it would not affect direct spending or revenues.

The Act contains no intergovernmental or private-sector mandates as defined in the Unfunded Mandates Reform Act.

== Procedural history ==
The Coast Guard and Maritime Transportation Act of 2014 was introduced into the United States House of Representatives on February 6, 2014, by Rep. Duncan Hunter (R, CA-50). It was referred to the United States House Committee on Transportation and Infrastructure and the United States House Transportation Subcommittee on Coast Guard and Maritime Transportation. On March 25, 2014, the bill was reported (amended) alongside House Report 113-384.

== Debate and discussion ==
Rep. Bill Shuster (R-PA) spoke in favor of the bill, describing it as a bill that "ensures the men and women of the Coast Guard have the tools they need to carry out their critical missions, enforce our laws on U.S. waters and on the high seas, and safeguard our Nation's maritime interests around the world." Rep. Duncan Hunter was also in favor of the bill, saying that the bill "improves the effectiveness of Coast Guard missions by reducing inefficient operations and enhancing oversight, places the Coast Guard's major systems acquisition program on a sustainable track, and encourages job growth in the U.S. maritime industry by cutting regulatory burdens on job creation."

Rep. Andy Barr (R-KY) testified in favor of the bill because it would "remove the requirement that Valley View Ferry captains be licensed through the Coast Guard, and instead allow the state to implement its own licensing requirement." At present, the local ferry has had to cut back on hours because the ferry has been unable to find a new captain for ferry due to the stringent Coast Guard requirements to get a merchant mariner license, despite the fact that the ferry only travels 500 feet on steel cables, without any steering capabilities. If the bill were to pass, the state government would be able to lower the licensing requirement for such a small ferry with only limited capabilities.

== See also ==
- List of bills in the 113th United States Congress
