= Gregg Cunningham =

American politician

Gregg L. Cunningham

Member of the Pennsylvania House of Representatives from the 77th district
- In office 1977–1982
- Preceded by: Helen Wise
- Succeeded by: Lynn Herman

Personal details
- Born: May 30, 1947 (age 79) Lewistown, Pennsylvania, United States
- Party: Republican

Gregg L. Cunningham (born May 30, 1947) is a Republican former member of the Pennsylvania House of Representatives. He is now executive director of the Center for Bio-Ethical Reform, an anti-abortion advocacy group.
