= Helen Wise =

American politician

Dr. Helen D. Wise

Member of the Pennsylvania House of Representatives from the 77th district
- In office 1977–1978
- Preceded by: Galen Dreibelbis
- Succeeded by: Gregg Cunningham

Personal details
- Born: September 11, 1928 (age 98) Sussex, New Jersey
- Party: Democratic
- Spouse: Howard E. Wise (m. 1949)
- Children: David, Dirk, Dan
- Education: Pennsylvania State University
- Occupation: Retired Pennsylvania state legislator and state cabinet member, Pennsylvania State University trustee, past president of the National Education Association and Pennsylvania State Education Association, and social studies teacher

Helen Dickerson Wise (born September 11, 1928) is a retired American politician and public education official. A former member of the board of trustees of Pennsylvania State University and past president of the Pennsylvania State Education Association and the National Education Association, she was also a Democratic member of the Pennsylvania House of Representatives.

A staunch advocate for America's public education system and political activist who played a key role in improving the collective bargaining rights, pay and working conditions for educators across the Commonwealth of Pennsylvania and the United States, she was also a prominent advocate for children, advising parents that:

"The most important thing is that parents are supportive of children in school. That means, it seems to me, listening to their concerns.... We have gone through the school of thought that the teacher is always right. That isn't necessarily so. That doesn't mean that we assume that the child is always right. But I think we learn to support youngsters by listening to them and if there are problems of getting to the teachers (teachers sometimes have as many as 150 or 200 children they teach in a day) it is up to the parents to communicate with the children and with the teacher so that they can help."

She was also a lifelong learning advocate, observing that "considering the great body of knowledge we have now, children don't go to school just to get those facts and that body of knowledge ... they are going to school so that they can learn how to keep on learning."

== Formative years ==
Born in Sussex, New Jersey on September 11, 1928, Wise earned her Bachelor of Arts, Master of Education, and Doctor of Education degrees at Pennsylvania State University. Her areas of focus were secondary education and social studies.

She met her future husband, Howard E. Wise (1924-2014) in 1949 while she was "preparing a Jersey cow for the upcoming Dairy Show at the "Ag Arena on Curtin Road" on the Penn State campus in State College. He was pursuing his master's degree in agricultural economics while she was in the midst of earning what would become her three degrees in secondary education. Five days after their date at the spring formal dance sponsored by Kappa Delta, they announced their engagement. Married at St. Paul's Methodist Church in State College on September 17, 1949, they subsequently raised three sons, David, Dirk and Dan, and were married for sixty-five years until Howard's death on October 14, 2014.

== Academic and governmental career ==
Wise began her career as a social studies teacher after relocating with her husband to Chester County, Pennsylvania in 1950. She then returned to State College with her family, and was employed by the State College Area School District for twenty years, beginning in 1958. She taught at all levels, and also taught secondary education classes at Penn State, where, in 1969, alumni elected her to her first term on the university's board of trustees. Subsequently re-elected to the board in 1972, she went on to serve her alma mater as a trustee for twenty-one years, chairing committees on educational policy and affirmative action.

In December 1968, she became the elected president of the Pennsylvania State Education Association (PSEA). Her first priorities were to secure the passage of a new state law that would improve collective bargaining rights for educators statewide and then to use those new bargaining powers to raise the starting salaries of public school teachers across Pennsylvania to $6,000 per year from that year's current minimum average of $5,400, followed by subsequent starting salary raises to $7,000 per year in 1971 and $8,000 per year under the next gubernatorial administration, with the ultimate goal of reaching an annual starting salary level of $10,500 during the mid-1970s.

She subsequently served as the figurehead of a demonstration by twenty thousand PSEA-affiliated teachers at the Pennsylvania State Capitol in Harrisburg, which prompted state legislators to both improve collective bargaining legislation for all public employees and increase state appropriations for school districts that supported pay raises for educators statewide.

She then became president of the National Education Association (NEA) in 1973. That year, she took a leave of absence from her job as a social studies teacher with the Westerly Parkway Junior High School in the State College school system to lead that American teachers' union, which had more than one million members at that time, and help turn it into a key influencer of American politics. One of her stated goals upon assuming office was "to build a $1 million campaign war chest" to "build NEA's political force over the next two years to the point where presidential candidates will seek NEA endorsement."

Wise served in the Pennsylvania House of Representatives, representing the 77th legislative district from 1976 to 1978. During her tenure, she chaired the subcommittee on human resources and served on the education, conservation and federal/state relations committees. She was also a member of the educational committee of the National Conference of State Legislatures and sat on the Pennsylvania Higher Education Assistance Agency board.

She later headed the Delaware State Education Association as executive director from 1979 to 1985, and was a member of the steering committee of the governor's Task Force on Education for Economic Growth in Delaware. In 1979, she lobbied Governor Pierre S. DuPont IV and the Delaware General Assembly to enact legislation that would improve collective bargaining rights across Delaware by giving all public employees the right to strike when other bargaining efforts failed to produce satisfactory improvements for workers. In 1980, she led her union in lobbying the state board of education to improve bargaining rights for Delaware educators by requiring school districts to participate in binding arbitration in order to avert possible teacher strikes.

Although retired from her Delaware post, Wise subsequently continued her public education advocacy and leadership by serving as a consultant and advisor to several local and national organizations and also serving as a trustee emerita with Penn State University.

In May 1993, she delivered the spring commencement address to graduates of Penn State's College of Education, saying:

"Make a difference. Remember those in our society who are ignored, neglected ... the most vulnerable among us. But most of all, if you do nothing else, remember the children.... See that they are educated and inspired, so that one day they'll sit where you are today. You and all the graduates of 1992 can truly make a difference."

At the time she delivered that address, Wise was in the process of completing the eight years she served on the staff of Governor Robert P. Casey, during which time she was the secretary for legislative affairs, secretary to the Cabinet, and deputy chief of staff for programs. She retired in 1995 after Casey completed his gubernatorial tenure.

=== Awards and other honors ===
In 1982, the All-Pennsylvania College Alumni Association named Wise as an Outstanding Alumna. Recognizing her impact on the quality of education in Delaware, the Delaware State Education Association established an award to be given annually in her name for distinguished contributions to education.

Penn State recognized her as an Alumni Fellow of the College of Education in 1987, and in 1990, the Lion's Paw Alumni Association awarded her its coveted Lion's Paw Medal for promoting the welfare of her alma mater and perpetuating its traditions.
