= Galen Dreibelbis =

American politician

Galen E. Dreibelbis

Member of the Pennsylvania House of Representatives from the 77th district
- In office 1971–1976
- Preceded by: Eugene Fulmer
- Succeeded by: Helen Wise

Personal details
- Born: January 3, 1935 (age 91) State College, Pennsylvania
- Party: Democratic

Galen E. Dreibelbis /ˈdraɪbəlbɪs/ (born January 3, 1935) is a former Democratic member of the Pennsylvania House of Representatives.

== Biography ==
Dreibelbis, a lifelong State College resident, is a commercial and residential real estate developer. He served three terms in the Pennsylvania Legislature (1971–76) before retiring to devote full-time to managing Nittany Gas and Oil Company, a firm which he founded in 1958 and sold in 1982, and other business interests.

== Philanthropy ==
Dreibelbis and his wife Nancy, a Mifflin County native, have given generously to Penn State and Mount Nittany Medical Center.
