= Scott Conklin =

American politician

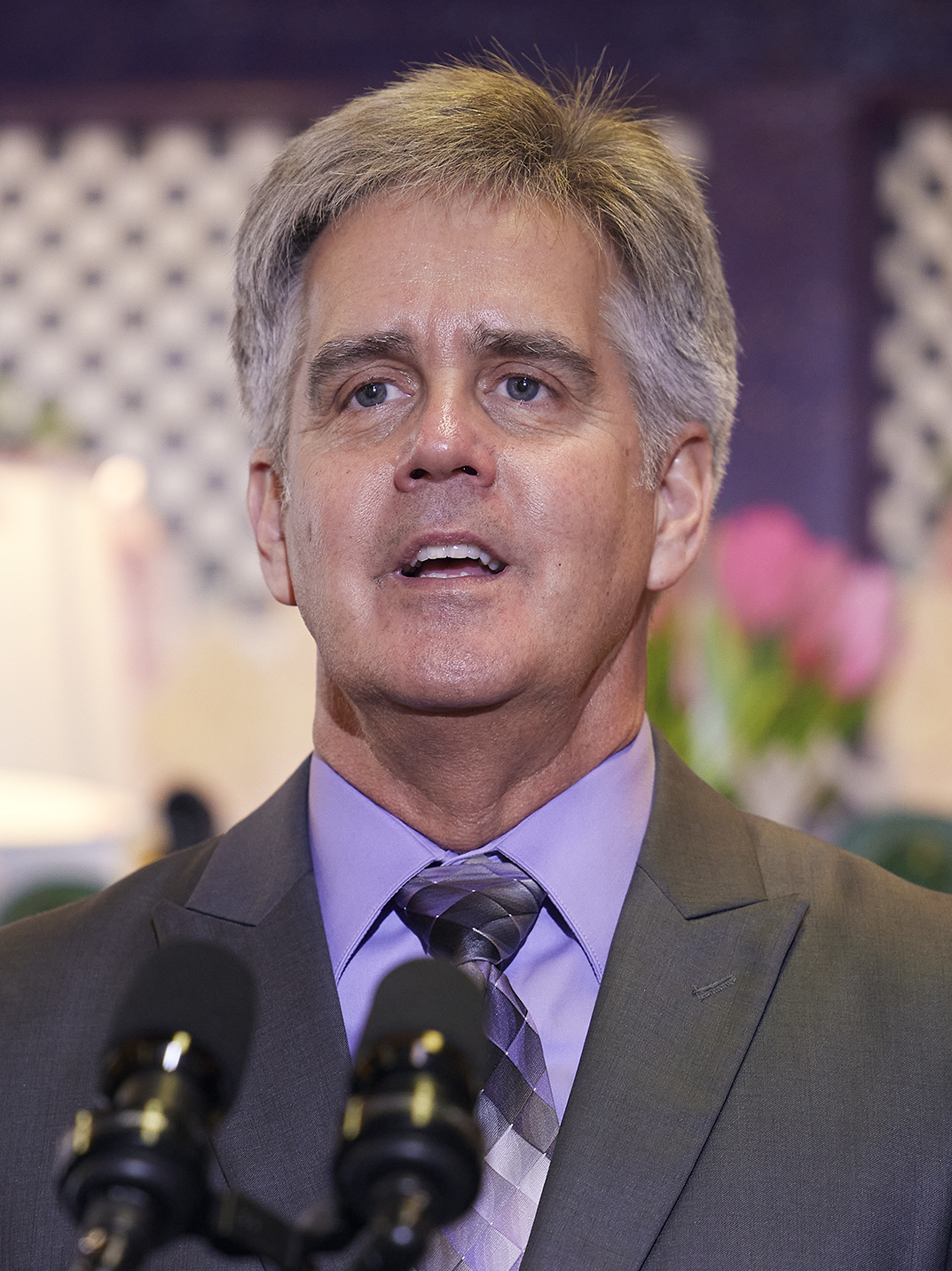

Member of the Pennsylvania House of Representatives from the 77th district
- Incumbent
- Assumed office January 2, 2007
- Preceded by: Lynn Herman

Centre County Commissioner
- In office January 3, 2000 – December 4, 2006

Personal details
- Born: October 7, 1958 (age 67) Philipsburg, Pennsylvania, U.S.
- Party: Democratic
- Spouse: Terri
- Children: 1
- Website: Government website

Harry Scott Conklin (born October 7, 1958) is an American politician serving as a Democratic member of the Pennsylvania House of Representatives for the 77th legislative district. He was first elected in 2006. Conklin is a Rush Township resident and has been married to his wife, Terri, since 1984. They have one son, Spencer, who was born in 1987. He was the Democratic nominee for Lieutenant Governor of Pennsylvania in 2010, losing by a ten percent margin.

== Early life ==
Conklin was born in 1958 in Philipsburg, Centre County, Pennsylvania. He graduated from Philipsburg-Osceola High School in 1977, and Clearfield County Vocational Technical School. Prior to elective office, Conklin owned a carpentry business from 1989 through 2007 and for 23 years owned Conklin's Corner Antique Mall. Before being elected to the state House in 2006, Conklin served as Centre County Commissioner for seven years. During his tenure as commissioner, he served as board chairman and chairman of the Salary Board, Retirement Board, Employee Benefits Trust, and Board of Assessment.

== Centre County Commission ==
In 2000, Conklin was elected to the Centre County Commission, serving from 2000 to 2006.

== 2001 congressional campaign ==
Following the resignation of Congressman Bud Shuster in 2001, Conklin ran as the Democratic nominee in the 2001 special election to succeed him in the 9th congressional district, but lost to Bill Shuster, the Congressman's son, in the general election.

== 2010 campaign for Lieutenant Governor ==
Conklin won the May primary election to become the Democratic nominee for lieutenant governor. He joined Allegheny County Chief Executive Dan Onorato on the Democratic ticket. Onorato and Conklin lost the November general election to the Republican ticket of State Attorney General Tom Corbett and Bucks County Commissioner Jim Cawley.

== 2020 Auditor General campaign ==
On January 6, 2020, Conklin announced his candidacy for Pennsylvania Auditor General, becoming the sixth Democrat to enter the race. Despite being perceived as having high name recognition, he ultimately placed fifth in the Democratic primary.

== Political career ==
Conklin currently serves as the Democratic Chair of the House State Government Committee.

Pennsylvania House of Representatives
Preceded by Lynn Herman	Member of the Pennsylvania House of Representatives for the 77th district 2007–present	Incumbent
Party political offices
Preceded by Catherine Baker Knoll	Democratic nominee for Lieutenant Governor of Pennsylvania; 2010	Succeeded by Michael J. Stack III
