= Eugene Fulmer =

American politician

Eugene M. Fulmer

Member of the Pennsylvania House of Representatives from the 77th district
- In office 1969–1970
- Preceded by: District created
- Succeeded by: Galen Dreibelbis

Member of the Pennsylvania House of Representatives from the Centre County district
- In office 1959–1968

Personal details
- Born: November 17, 1917 Ephrata Township, Pennsylvania
- Died: July 7, 1977 (aged 59)
- Party: Republican

Eugene M. Fulmer (November 17, 1917 – July 7, 1977) was a Republican member of the Pennsylvania House of Representatives.

== Formative years ==
Born in Ephrata Township, Lancaster County, Pennsylvania on November 17, 1917, Eugene Fulmer graduated from Ephrata High School before earning his Bachelor of Science degree from Pennsylvania State University in 1948. He then graduated from the Gould Academy in Maine in 1949 and from the Northeastern Institute for Commercial and Trade Associations at Yale University in 1954.

== Professional life ==
After serving in the military as a member of the United States Army, he was employed as an instructor by Penn State University from 1952 to 1955. Elected to the Pennsylvania House of Representatives in 1959, he served a total of six consecutive terms, representing Clearfield and Centre counties. A chair of the Centre County Republican Committee, he also served as director of research for the Intergovernmental Affairs Committee of the Republican Caucus in the Pennsylvania House.

== Death and interment ==
Fulmer died on July 7, 1977, in Hershey, Pennsylvania, and was interred at the Centre County Memorial Park in State College, Pennsylvania.
