= Home Heating Emergency Assistance Through Transportation Act of 2014 =

- Long title: To address shortages and interruptions in the availability of propane and other home heating fuels in the United States, and for other purposes.
- Acronyms (colloquial): HHEATT Act of 2014
- Announced in: the 113th United States Congress
- Sponsored by: Rep. Bill Shuster (R, PA-9)
- Number of co-sponsors: 9

Citations
- Public law: Pub. L. 113–90 (text) (PDF)

Codification
- Agencies affected: United States Department of Transportation, Federal Motor Carrier Safety Administration

Legislative history
- Introduced in the House as H.R. 4076 by Rep. Bill Shuster (R, PA-9) on February 25, 2014; Committee consideration by United States House Committee on Transportation and Infrastructure; Passed the House on March 4, 2014 (voice vote); Passed the Senate on March 14, 2014 (Unanimous consent); Signed into law by President Barack Obama on March 21, 2014

The Home Heating Emergency Assistance Through Transportation Act of 2014 (H.R. 4076) or HHEATT Act of 2014 is an act that created an emergency exception to existing Federal Motor Carrier Safety Administration (FMCSA) regulations. The exceptions allow truckers to drive for long hours if they are delivering home heating fuels, such as propane, to places where there is a shortage. The exemption lasts until May 31, 2014. An existing suspension was scheduled to expire on March 15, 2014.

The bill was introduced into the United States House of Representatives during the 113th United States Congress. On March 21, 2014, President Barack Obama signed the bill into law. It became Pub. L. 113–90 (text) (PDF).

== Background ==
The winter of 2013-2014 has been described as "especially cold," "exceptionally cold," and "brutal." This cold winter "made it a challenge to move home heating fuel quickly enough to meet increased demand."

Existing Federal Motor Carrier Safety Administration regulations require freight truckers to "drive up to 11 hours occurring within a 14-hour period and must have at least 34 consecutive hours off every seven days." The FMCSA says these rules to make roads safer by preventing truck drivers from getting too tired.

== Provisions ==
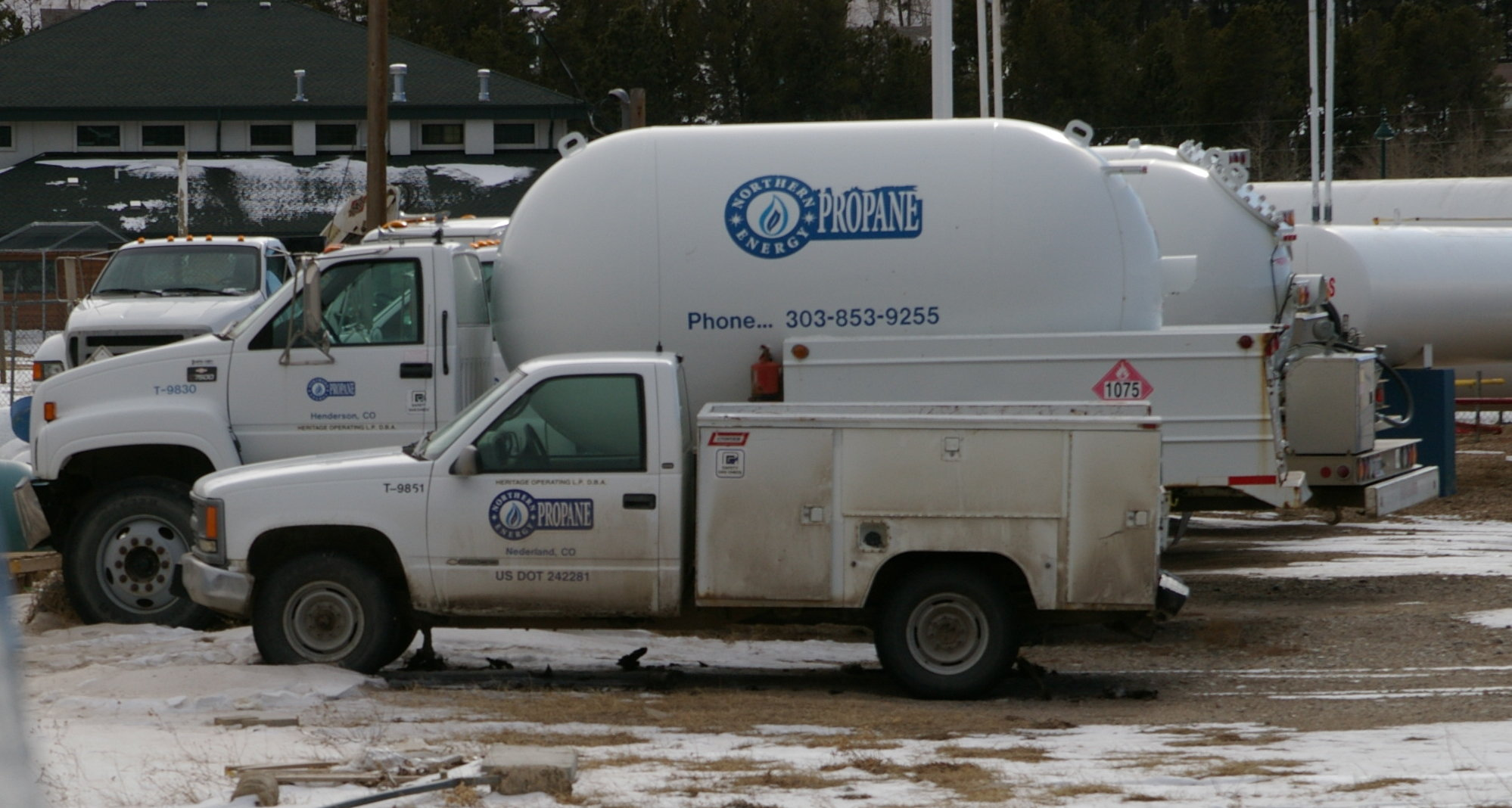
A local delivery truck, behind the pickup truck

This summary is based largely on the summary provided by the Congressional Research Service, a public domain source.

The Home Heating Emergency Assistance Through Transportation Act of 2014 or HHEATT Act of 2014 would declare that a covered emergency exemption from federal motor carrier safety regulations issued by the Federal Motor Carrier Safety Administration (FMCSA) shall remain in effect until May 31, 2014, unless the Secretary of Transportation (DOT) determines that the emergency for which the exemption was provided ends before that date.

The bill would define "covered emergency exemption" as one issued or extended between February 5, 2014, and the date of enactment of this Act to effect regulatory relief for commercial motor vehicle operations directly assisting the delivery of propane and home heating fuels.

The bill states that nothing in this Act may be construed to prohibit the FMCSA from issuing or extending a covered emergency exemption beyond May 31, 2014, under other federal law.

== Procedural history ==
The Home Heating Emergency Assistance Through Transportation Act of 2014 was introduced into the United States House of Representatives on February 25, 2014 by Rep. Bill Shuster (R, PA-9). The bill was referred to the United States House Committee on Transportation and Infrastructure. On February 29, 2014, House Majority Leader Eric Cantor announced that H.R. 4076 would be considered under a suspension of the rules on March 4, 2014. The House passed the bill in a voice vote on March 4, 2014. On March 13, 2014, the United States Senate voted by unanimous consent to pass the bill. President Barack Obama signed the bill into law on March 21, 2014.

== Debate and discussion ==
According to Majority Leader Eric Cantor, the issue of household energy costs need to be addressed because "the Energy Information Administration predicted that 90 percent of U.S. households would see higher home heating costs this year, and low income families already spend 12 percent of their household budget on energy costs."

Rep. Shuster argued in favor of the bill saying that the bill "will provide relief for millions of Americans suffering from the current propane and home heating fuel emergency." According to the Congressman, an "exceptionally cold winter" increased demand on propane, "which is used for heating approximately 12 million homes in the United States." The bill was supposed to solve shortages and lower prices.

== See also ==
- List of bills in the 113th United States Congress
- Early 2014 North American cold wave
- Propane
