= Pennsylvania's 30th Senate district =

American legislative district

Pennsylvania's 30th State Senate district
Senator
Judy Ward; R–Frankstown Township, Blair County
- Population (2021): 249,843

Pennsylvania State Senate District 30 includes all of Blair County, Fulton County, Huntingdon County, Juniata County, and Mifflin County. It is currently represented by Republican Judy Ward.

== Senators ==
Representative	Party	Years	District home	Note	Counties
Stanley G. Stroup	Republican	1969–1972			Bedford, Somerset, Blair (part)
Stanley G. Stroup	Republican	1973–1974			Blair, Bedford, Huntingdon, Mifflin (part), Somerset (part)
Robert C. Jubelirer	Republican	1975–1982			Blair, Bedford, Huntingdon, Mifflin (part), Somerset (part)
Robert C. Jubelirer	Republican	1983–2004			Blair, Bedford, Fulton, Huntingdon
Robert C. Jubelirer	Republican	2005–2006			Blair, Bedford, Fulton, Huntingdon, Mifflin (part)
John H. Eichelberger, Jr.	Republican	2007–2012			Blair, Bedford, Fulton, Huntingdon, Mifflin (part)
John H. Eichelberger, Jr.	Republican	2013–2018			Blair, Fulton, Cumberland (part), Franklin (part), Huntingdon (part)
Judy Ward	Republican	2019–present			Blair, Fulton, Cumberland (part), Franklin (part), Huntingdon (part)
