= Judy Ward =

American politician

Member of the Pennsylvania Senate from the 30th district
- Incumbent
- Assumed office January 1, 2019
- Preceded by: John Eichelberger

Member of the Pennsylvania House of Representatives from the 80th district
- In office January 6, 2015 – November 30, 2018
- Preceded by: Jerry Stern
- Succeeded by: Jim Gregory

Personal details
- Party: Republican
- Spouse: William T. Ward
- Children: 2 sons
- Profession: Registered nurse

Judith "Judy" Ward is a member of the Pennsylvania State Senate, representing the 30th Senatorial district in Blair County, Pennsylvania in the United States. A Republican, she previously served in the Pennsylvania House of Representatives.

== Education and career ==
Ward graduated from Hollidaysburg High School and was awarded a nursing degree by the Altoona Hospital School of Nursing. Employed as a registered nurse for twenty-two years, she was subsequently employed by Allegheny Lutheran Social Services, Bishop Guilfoyle Catholic High School, and as a medical, health and wellness coordinator at Ward Transport and Logistics. She also founded All About Towne, a relocation assistance company.

Ward is also a graduate of Pennsylvania State University's Rural and Urban Leadership (RULE) Program.

== Political career ==
In 2014 Ward was elected to represent the 80th District in the Pennsylvania House of Representatives, the first woman elected from the district. In July 2018 she won the Republican Party nomination for the election to succeed John Eichelberger representing the 30th District in the Pennsylvania State Senate; the Democratic nominee was also a woman, Emily Garbuny Best.

In January 2018, Ward and her fellow Republican House member Mike Turzai proposed HB2050 to ban abortions in the Commonwealth of Pennsylvania to prevent women from terminating pregnancies in cases when fetuses are diagnosed with Down syndrome. The bill was passed out of the Pennsylvania House's Health Committee without a public hearing of the proposed legislation on April 9, 2018 and rapidly scheduled for a final vote the next week.

On November 6, 2018, State Representative Judy Ward won the 30th State Senatorial District Seat, replacing Hon. Senator John Eichelberger. On January 1, 2019 Senator-elect Ward was sworn into office, as the first female state senator from the Pennsylvania 30th Senatorial District.

For the 2025-2026 Session, Ward serves on the following committees in the State Senate:

- Transportation (Chair)
- Aging & Youth (Vice Chair)
- Health & Human Services
- Institutional Sustainability & Innovation
- Rules & Executive Nominations
- State Government

== Political views ==
Described as one of the most consistently reliable conservative votes in the Pennsylvania Senate, she has received the support of multiple conservative groups, including the Pro-Life Federation of Pennsylvania, the NRA Political Victory Fund, and the conservative business entrepreneurs organization Commonwealth Partners. She was also the recipient of the "Award for Conservative Achievement" from the American Conservative Union.

In 2023, Ward introduced a bill to limit the impact of inflation on Social Security recipients.

== Personal ==
Ward and her husband Bill have two sons.
