= Lynn Herman =

American politician

Member of the Pennsylvania House of Representatives from the 77th district
- In office January 4, 1983 – November 30, 2006
- Preceded by: Gregg L. Cunningham
- Succeeded by: Scott Conklin

Personal details
- Born: October 30, 1956 (age 69) Philipsburg, Pennsylvania, U.S.
- Party: Republican
- Spouse: Barbara
- Education: University of Pittsburgh

Lynn B. Herman (born October 30, 1956) is a former Republican member of the Pennsylvania House of Representatives.

He is a 1974 graduate of Philipsburg-Osceola Area High School. He earned a B.A. in 1978 and an M.P.A. in 1980 from the University of Pittsburgh.

He was first elected to represent the 77th legislative district in the Pennsylvania House of Representatives in 1982. He retired prior to the 2006 elections.
