= John Joyce (American politician) =

American politician (born 1957)

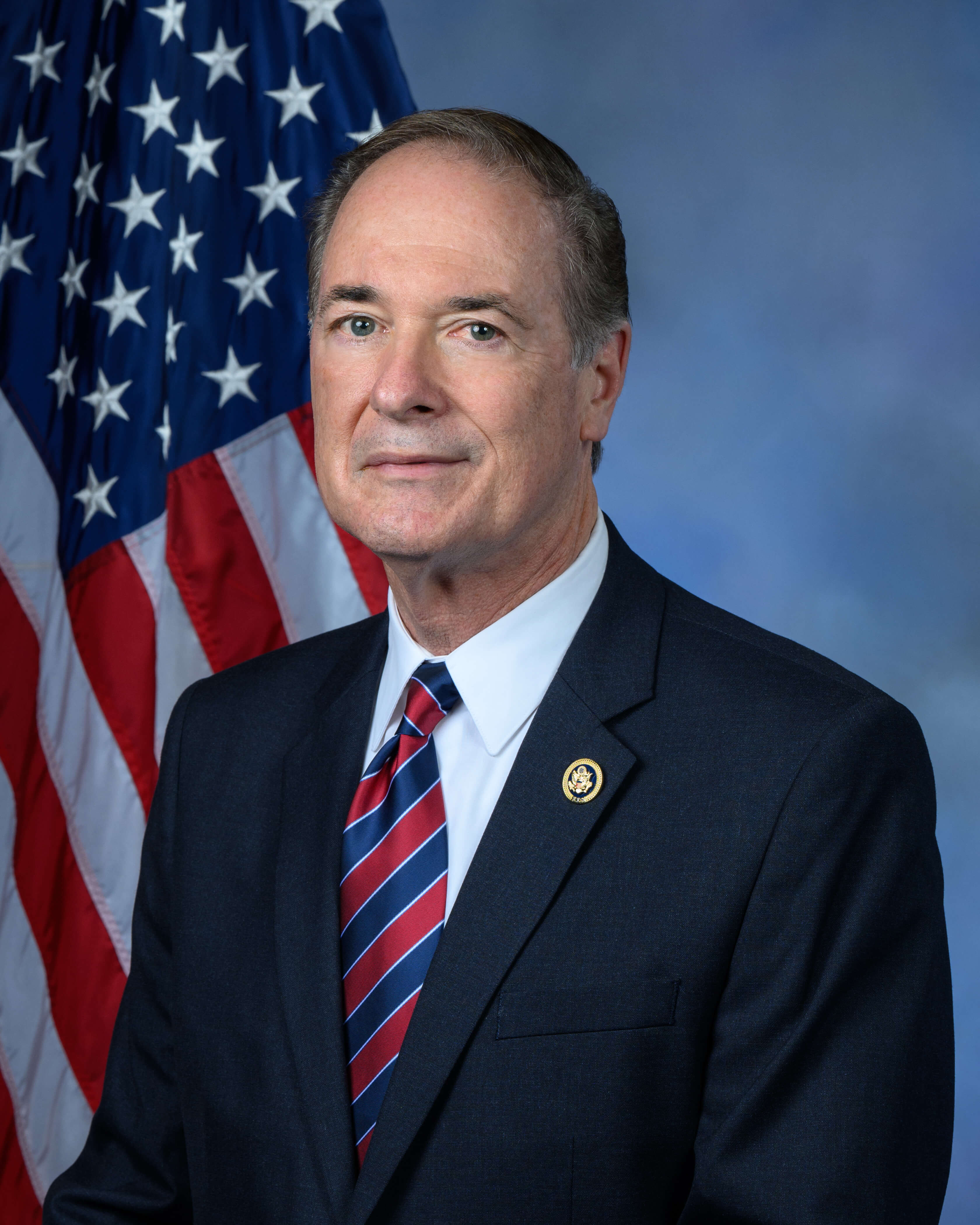
- Official portrait, 2025

Member of the U.S. House of Representatives from Pennsylvania's 13th district
- Incumbent
- Assumed office January 3, 2019
- Preceded by: Bill Shuster (redistricted)

Personal details
- Born: John Patrick Joyce; February 8, 1957 (age 69) Altoona, Pennsylvania, U.S.
- Party: Republican
- Spouse: Alice Joyce
- Children: 3
- Education: Pennsylvania State University, Altoona (attended); Pennsylvania State University (BS); Temple University (MD)
- Website: House website Campaign website

John Patrick Joyce (born February 8, 1957) is an American politician and dermatologist serving as the U.S. representative for Pennsylvania's 13th congressional district since 2019. A member of the Republican Party, he was elected to succeed Bill Shuster, who chose not to seek re-election. The district, which is largely rural, includes most of South Central Pennsylvania, encompassing the city of Altoona and the boroughs of Chambersburg and Gettysburg.

== Early life and education ==
Joyce was born and raised in Altoona, Pennsylvania. He graduated from Pennsylvania State University with his bachelor's degree and Temple University School of Medicine with his Doctor of Medicine. He completed his medical residency in internal medicine and dermatology at Johns Hopkins Hospital. Joyce is Roman Catholic.

== U.S. House of Representatives ==
=== Elections ===
==== 2018 ====
In 2018, Joyce ran for the United States House of Representatives in Pennsylvania's 13th congressional district. He won the Republican Party primary election against seven other candidates with 22% of the vote. The district had previously been the 9th, represented by nine-term incumbent Bill Shuster, who announced his retirement in January 2018; he and his father, Bud, had represented this district for 46 years. Like its predecessor, it is heavily Republican. Donald Trump won the old 9th in 2016 with 69% of the vote, his strongest showing in the state. He would have won the new 13th just as easily had it existed in 2016, with 71% of the vote. With a Cook Partisan Voting Index of R+22, on paper it was Pennsylvania's most Republican district.

Joyce won the general election against Brent Ottaway with 70.5% of the vote.

==== 2020 ====
Joyce voted against the certification of the 2020 United States presidential election.

Joyce was reelected on November 3, 2020, with 73.5% of the vote.

=== Tenure ===
In December 2020, Joyce was one of 126 Republican members of the House of Representatives to sign an amicus brief in support of Texas v. Pennsylvania, a lawsuit filed at the United States Supreme Court contesting the results of the 2020 presidential election, in which Joe Biden defeated incumbent Donald Trump. The Supreme Court declined to hear the case on the basis that Texas lacked standing under Article III of the Constitution to challenge the results of an election held by another state.

==== Immigration ====
Joyce voted against the Fairness for High-Skilled Immigrants Act of 2019 which would amend the Immigration and Nationality Act to eliminate the per-country numerical limitation for employment-based immigrants, to increase the per-country numerical limitation for family-sponsored immigrants, and for other purposes.

Joyce voted against the Further Consolidated Appropriations Act of 2020 which authorizes DHS to nearly double the available H-2B visas for the remainder of FY 2020.

Joyce voted against the Consolidated Appropriations Act (H.R. 1158), which effectively prohibits ICE from cooperating with Health and Human Services to detain or remove illegal alien sponsors of unaccompanied alien children (UACs).

==== Foreign policy ====
===== Syria =====
In 2023, Joyce was among 47 Republicans to vote in favor of H.Con.Res. 21 which directed President Joe Biden to remove U.S. troops from Syria within 180 days.

===== Somalia =====
In 2023, Joyce was among 52 Republicans to vote to remove American troops from Somalia by voting for H.Con.Res. 30.

===== Ukraine =====
In 2023, Joyce was among 98 Republicans to vote for a ban on cluster munitions to Ukraine.

In 2023, Joyce voted for a moratorium on aid to Ukraine.

In 2024, Joyce voted against the $60 billion military aid package for Ukraine; The Washington Post reported that some of the funding would have supported defense jobs in his constituency.

=== Committee assignments ===
- Committee on Energy and Commerce
  - Subcommittee on Health
  - Subcommittee on Oversight and Investigations

=== Caucus memberships ===
- Army Caucus
- Auto Care Caucus
- Bus Caucus
- Dairy Caucus
- GOP Doctors Caucus
- Irish Caucus
- Paper and Packing Caucus

== Electoral history ==
Republican primary results
Party	Candidate	Votes	%
Republican	John Joyce	14,615	21.9
Republican	John Eichelberger	13,101	19.6
Republican	Stephen Bloom	12,195	18.3
Republican	Doug Mastriano	10,485	15.7
Republican	Art Halvorson	10,161	15.2
Republican	Travis Schooley	3,030	4.5
Republican	Bernie Washabaugh	1,908	2.9
Republican	Ben Hornberger	1,182	1.8
Total votes		66,677	100.0

Pennsylvania's 13th congressional district, 2018
Party	Candidate	Votes	%
Republican	John Joyce	178,533	70.5
Democratic	Brent Ottaway	74,733	29.5
Total votes		253,266	100.0
Republican hold			

Pennsylvania's 13th congressional district election, 2020
Party	Candidate	Votes	%
Republican	John Joyce (incumbent)	267,789	73.5
Democratic	Todd Rowley	96,612	26.5
Total votes		364,401	100.0

2022 Pennsylvania's 13th congressional district election
Party	Candidate	Votes	%
Republican	John Joyce (incumbent)	Unopposed	
Total votes		260,345	100.0

Pennsylvania's 13th congressional district, 2024
Party	Candidate	Votes	%
Republican	John Joyce (incumbent)	301,460	74.2
Democratic	Beth Farnham	104,823	25.8
Total votes		406,283	100.0

U.S. House of Representatives
Preceded by Brendan Boyle	Member of the U.S. House of Representatives from Pennsylvania's 13th congressional district 2019–present	Incumbent
U.S. order of precedence (ceremonial)
Preceded by Dusty Johnson	United States representatives by seniority 210th	Succeeded by Susie Lee
