= John Eichelberger =

American politician

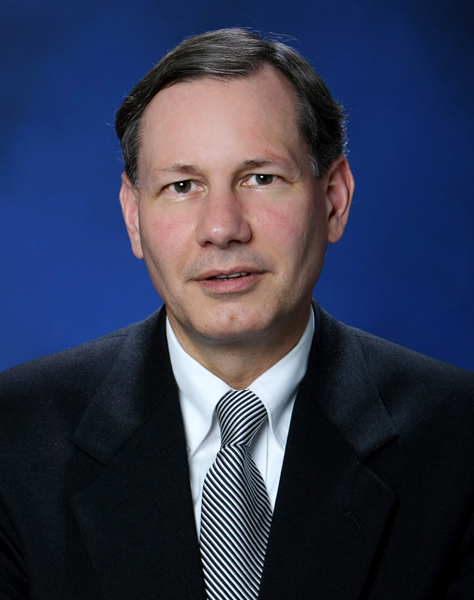

Member of the Pennsylvania Senate from the 30th district
- In office January 2, 2007 – November 30, 2018
- Preceded by: Robert Jubelirer
- Succeeded by: Judy Ward

Member of the Blair County Board of Commissioners
- In office 1995–2007

Personal details
- Born: September 1, 1958 (age 67) Altoona, Pennsylvania, U.S.
- Party: Republican
- Spouse: Charlotte Eichelberger

John Eichelberger (born September 1, 1958) of Blair Township, Pennsylvania is an American politician and former Pennsylvania State Senator. He is a member of the Republican Party. He represented the 30th district of the Pennsylvania State Senate.

Eichelberger gained notoriety following his defeat of Senate President Pro-Tempore Robert Jubelirer in the May 2006 primary election. In 2018, he ran to represent Pennsylvania's 13th congressional district in the U.S. House, though lost his party's nomination in the primary.

== Biography ==
Prior to his career in government, Eichelberger was the President of an insurance brokerage in Altoona, Pennsylvania. In 1995, he was elected to the Blair County Commission. He was re-elected in 1999 and 2003. During his tenure as county commissioner, he was a major critic of local Congressman Bud Shuster, focusing on Shuster's "ethical clouds" in the later years of his tenure. When Shuster resigned in February 2001, Eichelberger's name was floated as a possible successor. Instead, the Republican State Committee selected Shuster's son, Bill Shuster, to be the Republican nominee for the May 2001 special election. Bill Shuster won the committee's nomination after replacing 18 members of the Blair County, Pennsylvania Republican Committee with his own supporters.

=== 2006 Election ===
His Senate campaign was sparked by the 2005 Pennsylvania pay raise. Senate President Pro Tem Robert Jubelirer was a rival in Blair County politics who had supported the pay increase. His campaign was aided by conservative Bob Guzzardi. Eichelberger attacked Jubelirer for his support of the raise as well as his stance on abortion. During the campaign, Eichelberger received support from conservatives such as former congressman Pat Toomey and former Lieutenant Governor Bill Scranton. Jubelirer counter-attacked, noting that Eichelberger had benefited from pay raises as a commissioner. In addition, Jubelirer alleged that Eichelberger had a poor voting record on the commission.

On primary election day, Eichelberger took 44% to Jubelirer's 36% and C. Arnold McClure's 20%. Jubelirer and David Brightbill were the first top-ranked General Assembly leaders to be defeated in a primary since 1964. Eichelberger went on to defeat businessman and Democratic candidate Greg Morris in the general election with 62.7% of the vote.

He was unopposed for re-election in 2010 and in 2014.

=== 2018 Republican primary ===
Following the announcement of longtime U.S. Rep. Bill Shuster's retirement in January 2018, State Sen. John Eichelberger threw his hat into the ring for the Republican nomination to succeed Rep. Shuster. While originally running in the ninth, the State Supreme Court struck down Republican-drawn maps from the 2010 U.S. Census and redrew the Congressional maps ahead of the 2018 midterm election. This changed the 9th Congressional district to the 13th, shifting the district eastward.

In addition to Eichelberger, the ballot for the Republican primary included 2014 candidate Travis Schooley, 2014 and 2016 candidate Art Halvorson, Altoona dermatologist John Joyce, Army veteran Douglas Mastriano, businessman Bernie Washabaugh, MAGA activist Benjamin Hornberger, and State Rep. Steve Bloom. Given this being the first election to not host a Shuster within the district since 1970, the primary proved highly competitive and extensively costly. In the end, John Eichelberger finished second with 19.8% of the vote, or 13,311 votes, in comparison to John Joyce's first place of 22.0%, or 14,828.

=== Post-Senate Career ===
Following his defeat in 2018, Eichelberger returned to the PA Senate for the remainder of his term before retiring from the Senate in December 2018, being succeeded by State Rep. Judy Ward. Eichelberger returned to private life as President of his insurance company, Complete Insurance Services. Inc. Despite his exit from elected office, Eichelberger remains actively involved with different policy initiatives and local causes, such as serving as Pennsylvania Co-Chair of U.S. Term Limits and endorsing Scott Barger, who challenged and bested PA State Rep. Jim Gregory in the 2024 Republican primary.

== Electoral history ==
Pennsylvania Senate, District 30: May 2006 Primary Election
Party	Candidate	Votes	%	±%
Republican	John Eichelberger	15,445	43.9	
Republican	Robert Jubelirer	12,662	36.0	
Republican	C. Arnold McClure	7,097	20.2	

Pennsylvania Senate, District 30: November 2006 General Election
Party	Candidate	Votes	%	±%
Republican	John Eichelberger	45,607	62.7	
Democratic	Greg Morris	27,106	37.3	
Republican hold		Swing		

Pennsylvania Senate, District 30: November 2010 General Election
Party	Candidate	Votes	%	±%
Republican	John Eichelberger	67,457	100	+37.3
Republican hold		Swing		

Pennsylvania Senate, District 30: November 2014 General Election
Party	Candidate	Votes	%	±%
Republican	John Eichelberger	52,042	100	
Republican hold		Swing		

2018 Republican primary election: U.S. House of Representatives, District 13
Party	Candidate	Votes	%
Republican	John Joyce	14,828	22.0%
Republican	John Eichelberger	13,311	19.8%
Republican	Stephen Bloom	12,231	18.2%
Republican	Douglas Mastriano	10,509	15.6%
Republican	Art Halvorson	10,323	15.3%
Republican	Travis Schooley	3,036	4.5%
Republican	Bernie Washabaugh II	1,913	2.8%
Republican	Benjamin Hornberger	1,195	1.8%

Pennsylvania State Senate
Preceded by Robert Jubelirer	Member of the Pennsylvania Senate for the 30th District; 2007– Nov. 30, 2018	Succeeded by Judy Ward
