= Bill Shuster =

American politician (born 1961)

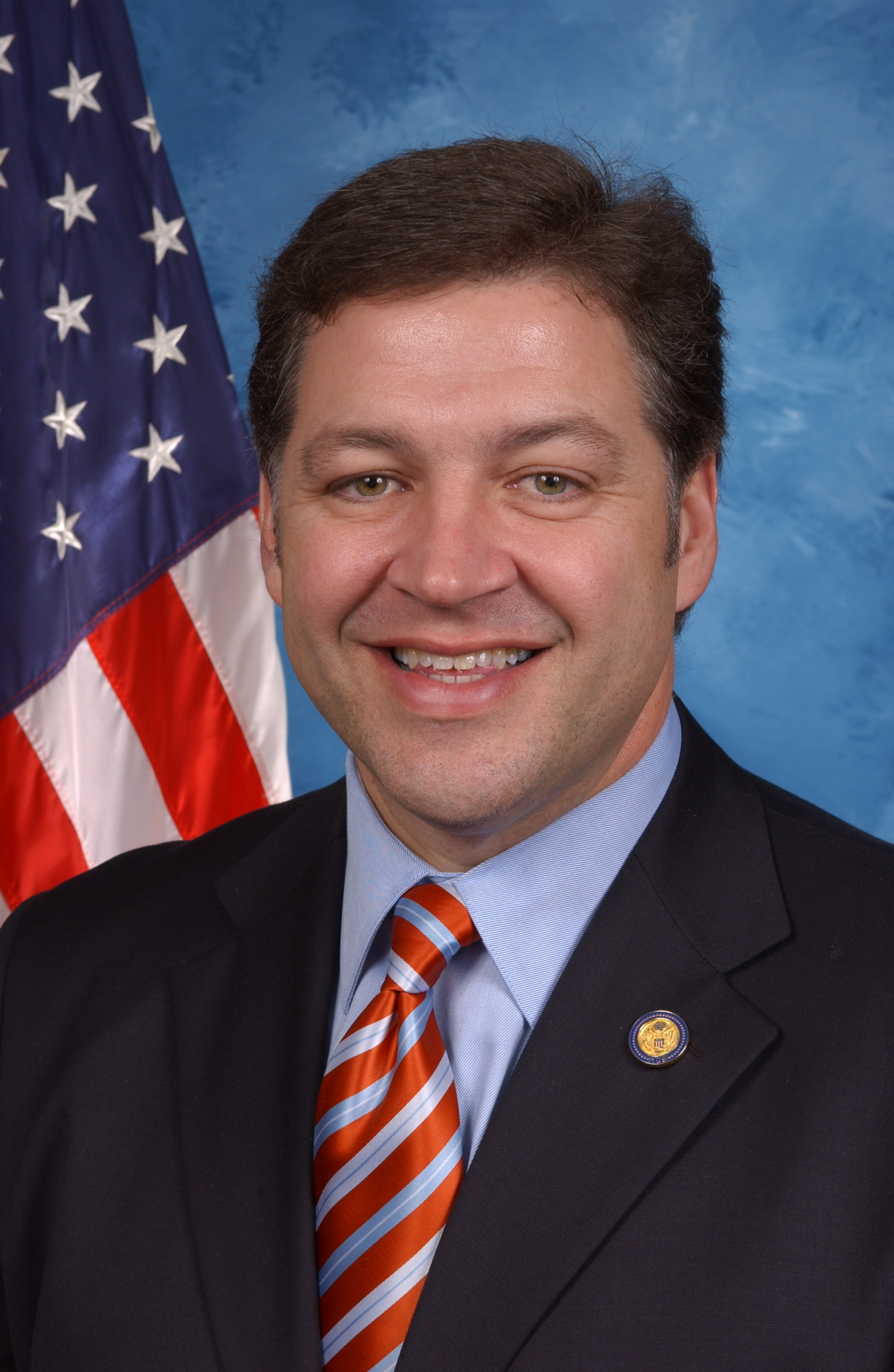

Chair of the House Transportation Committee
- In office January 3, 2013 – January 3, 2019
- Preceded by: John Mica
- Succeeded by: Peter DeFazio

Member of the U.S. House of Representatives from Pennsylvania's 9th district
- In office May 15, 2001 – January 3, 2019 (Note: Shuster's official service begins on the date of the special election, while he was not sworn in until May 17, 2001.)
- Preceded by: Bud Shuster
- Succeeded by: John Joyce (redistricted)

Personal details
- Born: William Franklin Shuster; January 10, 1961 (age 65) McKeesport, Pennsylvania, U.S.
- Party: Republican
- Spouse: Rebecca Shuster (divorced)
- Education: Dickinson College (BA); American University (MBA)
- Shuster's voice Shuster supporting legislation to fund surface transportation and mass transit projects. Recorded November 3, 2015

William Franklin Shuster (/ˈʃuːstər/ SHOO-stər; born January 10, 1961) is an American politician and lobbyist who served as the U.S. representative for Pennsylvania's 9th congressional district from 2001 to 2019. He is a member of the Republican Party, and is a son of former congressman Bud Shuster.

In January 2018, Shuster announced his retirement from Congress at the end of his eighth term, and did not run for re-election in 2018. He was succeeded as the Representative for PA-9 by fellow Republican Dan Meuser, although redistricting meant his actual district became the 13th which was won by Republican John Joyce, and as House Transportation Committee Chairman by Peter DeFazio (a Democrat from Oregon's 4th district).

== Early life and career ==
Shuster was born in McKeesport, Pennsylvania, the son of H. Patricia (née Rommel) and Elmer Greinert "Bud" Shuster. His ancestry includes German and Irish. He graduated from Dickinson College, where he earned a Bachelor of Arts in political science and in History. Shuster also became a member of the Sigma Chi fraternity while at Dickinson. He then earned a Master of Business Administration from American University.

Prior to entering politics, Shuster worked on his family farm in Bedford County and at Goodyear Tire, Rubber Corporation, and Bandag Incorporated. He also owned and operated an automobile dealership in East Freedom, Pennsylvania.

== Elections to the House of Representatives ==
=== 2001 special election to Congress ===
After his father, Republican U.S. Congressman Bud Shuster, resigned from Congress on February 3, 2001, following a strong rebuke from the House Ethics Committee for his relationship with a transportation lobbyist, Bill Shuster ran in the special election to succeed him in the 9th congressional district. On February 18, 2001, he won the Republican nomination, receiving 69 out of 133 votes at the district convention, while State Representative Patrick Fleagle placed second with 38 votes and Blair County Commissioner John Eichelberger placed third with 10 votes. In the May 15, 2001, special election, Shuster defeated the Democratic nominee, Centre County Commissioner Scott Conklin, 52%–44%. Shuster won nine of the district's eleven counties. Conklin won Centre (58%) and Clearfield (55%). Conklin's performance was the strongest for a Democratic candidate until 2018, when Republican Congressman Dan Meuser won re-election with 59.8 percent of the vote.

=== Bush era elections (2002, 2004, and 2006) ===
In the redistricting after the 2000 Census, Centre County was taken out of the district while portions of Somerset, Cambria, Indiana, Fayette, and Cumberland Counties were added to the district. In November 2002, the district reverted to form, and Shuster won his first full term, defeating John R. Henry 71%–29%.

Unlike 2002, Shuster was challenged in the 2004 Republican primary. He defeated businessman Michael DelGrosso 51%–49%. In November, he won re-election to his second full term, defeating Democrat Paul Politis 70%–30%, winning every county in the district.

Shuster won re-election to his third full term in 2006, defeating Democrat Tony Barr 60%–40%. He lost only three counties: Clearfield, Cambria, and Fayette.

=== Obama era elections (2008, 2010, 2012, and 2014) ===
Shuster won re-election to his fourth full term in 2008, defeating Democrat Tony Barr again, 64%–36%. This time he won all fourteen counties.

In 2010, Shuster won re-election to his fifth full term, defeating Democrat Tom Conners 73%–27%, winning all fourteen counties.

After redistricting following the 2010 Census, the 9th moved even further to the west, gaining portions of Westmoreland, Greene, and Washington Counties. Shuster won re-election to his sixth full term, defeating Democrat Karen Ramsburg 62%–38%. With the 113th Congress, elected in 2012, Bill Shuster became Chairman of the House Transportation Committee, a position he would hold for the following 2 Congresses.

In 2014, Shuster was in a primary with Bedford County businessman Art Halvorson and Franklin County project manager Travis Schooley. The primary was held on May 20, 2014. Shuster won with 53% of the vote. Art Halvorson received 34% and Travis Schooley received 13%.

In 2015, Shuster, who was the House Transportation and Infrastructure Committee Chairman, said he was dating Shelley Rubino, the vice president of government affairs for Airlines for America (A4A), a lobbying group for airlines. Politico said their relationship had started in summer 2014 and had signed an agreement that Rubino would not lobby Shuster or his staff. Shuster, however, had other ties to A4A, having hired a former A4A executive onto the aviation subcommittee, and Shuster's chief of staff is married to an executive of A4A. Politico also noted the similarity to his father's conflicted lobbyist relationship and resignation.

=== Trump era election (2016) and retirement ===
In 2016, Shuster won reelection in what would later turn out to be his eighth and final full term. He was challenged by Arthur Halvorson in the Republican primary, with Shuster only barely winning a majority, at 50.6%, in the two-way race. Described as "one of the more bizarre and nasty congressional campaigns", Shuster's ex-wife was in his campaign ads, defending him and their family. In a set of events that even Shuster's opponent described as unprecedented, Halvorson received enough write-ins in the Democratic primary to become the Democratic Party's candidate in the 9th district. Halvorson, who is considered to be further to the right than Shuster, accepted the Democratic nomination, but vowed to caucus as a conservative Republican if elected to Congress. In the general election, Shuster beat Halvorson again, this time with 63.3% of the vote.

Shuster announced in January 2018 that he wouldn't be seeking reelection later that year, and that he thus would be retiring with the end of the 115th Congress in January 2019. The Congressman, who has been Chairman of the House Transportation Committee since 2013, said he would be spending his final year in the House working with President Trump on what he describes as a "massive infrastructure bill". Shuster cited his desire to pass such a bill, and the fact that worrying about getting reelected would distract from that, as reasons for his retirement.

== Time in the House of Representatives ==
=== Political positions ===
Shuster has been a member of the Transportation and Infrastructure Committee since being elected in 2001 and was selected to be chairman of the committee for the 113th Congress. His father had chaired the committee from 1995 to 2001.

In 2013, as a member of the House Armed Services Committee as well, Shuster was an opponent of the $380 million Medium Extended Air Defense System project, which has been deemed too expensive by the Army to complete.

Shuster held a 90.64 percent lifetime rating from the American Conservative Union in 2012. He opposes abortion, consistently receiving a 0 percent rating from NARAL Pro-Choice America and Planned Parenthood and a 100 percent rating from the National Right to Life Committee. A strong supporter of gun rights, Shuster has supported the interests of Gun Owners of America and received an A rating from the National Rifle Association in 2002, 2004, 2006, 2008, 2010, and 2012. Shuster does not rate highly with education unions. The National Education Association has given Shuster a grade of F and he was given a rating of 25 percent by the National Association of Elementary School Principals in 2007.

Shuster has received the "Spirit of Enterprise Award" from the U.S. Chamber of Commerce and rated highly on the scorecards of the National Tax Limitation Committee and American Farm Bureau Federation.

Shuster was a state co-chair for the 2012 presidential campaign of Mitt Romney.

In May 2013, Shuster introduced H.R. 2125, the No IRS Implementation of Obamacare Act; the bill sought to bar the stated that the Internal Revenue Service violated the public trust and cannot be relied on to implement the Patient Protection and Affordable Care Act.

Shuster sponsored The Water Resources and Redevelopment Act of 2013 (WRRDA). He sponsored this bill from his position as the House Chairman of the Transportation and Infrastructure Committee.

In January 2014, Shuster created a bipartisan panel of legislators to examine ways to use public-private partnerships to carry out various types of projects, such as water infrastructure, transportation and economic development, according to Ripon Advance.

=== Legislation sponsored ===
- Home Heating Emergency Assistance Through Transportation Act of 2014 (H.R. 4076; 113th Congress) – Shuster introduced this bill on February 25, 2014. The bill would create an emergency exception to existing Federal Motor Carrier Safety Administration (FMCSA) regulations. The exceptions would allow truckers to drive for long hours if they are delivering home heating fuels, such as propane, to places where there is a shortage. Shuster argued in favor of the bill saying that the bill "will provide relief for millions of Americans suffering from the current propane and home heating fuel emergency." According to the Congressman, an "exceptionally cold winter" increased demand on propane, "which is used for heating approximately 12 million homes in the United States."
- Transparent Airfares Act of 2014 (H.R. 4156; 113th Congress) – Shuster introduced this bill on March 6, 2014. The bill would change government regulations about how airlines advertise fares so that they could advertise the base fare and separately list the government imposed taxes and fees.

=== Legislation supported ===
The Coast Guard and Maritime Transportation Act of 2014 (H.R. 4005; 113th Congress) is a bill that would amend laws that govern the activities of the United States Coast Guard (USCG), the Maritime Administration (MARAD) within the Department of Transportation, and the Federal Maritime Commission (FMC). Shuster spoke in favor of the bill, describing it as a bill that "ensures the men and women of the Coast Guard have the tools they need to carry out their critical missions, enforce our laws on U.S. waters and on the high seas, and safeguard our Nation's maritime interests around the world."

=== Committee assignments ===
- Committee on Armed Services
  - Subcommittee on Emerging Threats and Capabilities
- Committee on Transportation and Infrastructure (chair)
  - Subcommittee on Highways and Transit
  - Subcommittee on Railroads, Pipelines, and Hazardous Materials
  - Subcommittee on Water Resources and Environment

=== Caucus memberships ===
- Army Corps Reform Caucus
- Congressional Azerbaijan Caucus – Co-chairman
- Depot Caucus
- Intelligent Transportation Caucus
- United States Congressional International Conservation Caucus
- Older Americans Caucus
- Sportsmen's Caucus
- Congressional Cement Caucus
- Ohio River Basin Congressional Caucus
- Republican Main Street Partnership.

== Post−political career ==
In 2019, Shuster signed on to the lobbying firm Squire Patton Boggs.

== Personal life ==
Shuster was married for over 20 years and divorced in 2014. He was linked with Shelley Rubino, the vice president of government affairs for Airlines for America (A4A) in 2014 and said he was dating her in 2015. Shuster is a Lutheran.

U.S. House of Representatives
| Preceded by Bud Shuster | Member of the U.S. House of Representatives from Pennsylvania's 9th congressional district 2001–2019 | Succeeded by Dan Meuser |
| Preceded by John Mica | Chair of the House Transportation Committee; 2013–2019 | Succeeded by Peter DeFazio |
U.S. order of precedence (ceremonial)
| Preceded by Dick Schulze as Former U.S. Representative | Order of precedence of the United States as Former U.S. Representative | Succeeded by John Linder as Former U.S. Representative |
