= 2016 United States House of Representatives elections in Pennsylvania =

- November 8, 2016

All 18 Pennsylvania seats to the United States House of Representatives
	Majority party	Minority party
Party	Republican	Democratic
Last election	13	5
Seats won	13	5
Seat change	Steady	Steady
Popular vote	3,096,576	2,625,157
Percentage	53.91%	45.70%
Swing	▼1.63%	▲1.24%

Republican hold Democratic hold
Republican
50–60%
60–70%
70–80%
80–90%
>90%
Democratic
50–60%
60–70%
70–80%
80–90%
>90%

The 2016 United States House of Representatives elections in Pennsylvania were held on November 8, 2016, to elect the 18 U.S. representatives from the Commonwealth of Pennsylvania, one from each of the state's 18 congressional districts. The elections coincided with the 2016 U.S. presidential election, as well as other elections to the House of Representatives, elections to the United States Senate, and various state and local elections. The primaries were held on April 26.

== Overview ==
=== Statewide ===
Party	Candidates	Votes		Seats		
Party	Candidates	No.	%	No.	+/–	%
Republican	17	3,096,576	53.91	13	Steady	72.22
Democratic	16	2,625,157	45.70	5	Steady	27.78
Libertarian	2	22,245	0.39	0	Steady	0.0
Total	35	5,743,978	100.0	18	Steady	100.0

Popular vote
Republican	53.91%
Democratic	45.70%
Other	0.39%

House seats
Republican	72.22%
Democratic	27.78%

=== District ===
Results of the 2016 United States House of Representatives elections in Pennsylvania:

District	Republican		Democratic		Others		Total		Result
District	Votes	%	Votes	%	Votes	%	Votes	%	Result
District 1	53,219	17.80%	245,791	82.20%	0	0.00%	299,010	100.0%	Democratic hold
District 2	35,131	9.82%	322,514	90.18%	0	0.00%	357,645	100.0%	Democratic hold
District 3	244,893	100.0%	0	0.00%	0	0.00%	244,893	100.0%	Republican hold
District 4	220,628	66.06%	113,372	33.94%	0	0.00%	334,000	100.0%	Republican hold
District 5	206,761	67.16%	101,082	32.84%	0	0.00%	307,843	100.0%	Republican hold
District 6	207,469	57.24%	155,000	42.76%	0	0.00%	362,469	100.0%	Republican hold
District 7	225,678	59.47%	153,824	40.53%	0	0.00%	379,502	100.0%	Republican hold
District 8	207,263	54.43%	173,555	45.57%	0	0.00%	380,818	100.0%	Republican hold
District 9	186,580	63.34%	107,985	36.66%	0	0.00%	294,565	100.0%	Republican hold
District 10	211,282	70.17%	89,823	29.83%	0	0.00%	301,105	100.0%	Republican hold
District 11	199,421	63.67%	113,800	36.33%	0	0.00%	313,221	100.0%	Republican hold
District 12	221,851	61.76%	137,353	38.24%	0	0.00%	359,204	100.0%	Republican hold
District 13	0	0.00%	239,316	100.0%	0	0.00%	239,316	100.0%	Democratic hold
District 14	87,999	25.63%	255,293	74.37%	0	0.00%	343,292	100.0%	Democratic hold
District 15	190,618	58.39%	124,129	38.02%	11,727	3.59%	326,474	100.0%	Republican hold
District 16	168,669	53.76%	134,586	42.89%	10,518	3.35%	313,773	100.0%	Republican hold
District 17	135,430	46.20%	157,734	53.80%	0	0.00%	293,164	100.0%	Democratic hold
District 18	293,684	100.0%	0	0.00%	0	0.00%	293,684	100.0%	Republican hold
Total	3,096,576	53.91%	2,625,15	45.70%	22,245	0.39%	5,743,978	100.0%	

== District 1 ==
2016 Pennsylvania's 1st congressional district election
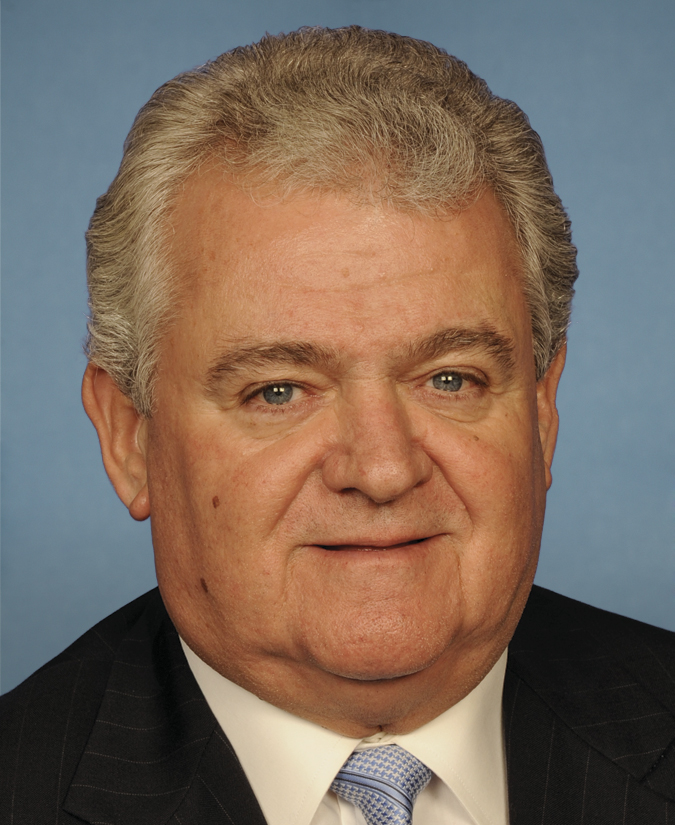

Nominee	Bob Brady	Debbie Williams
Party	Democratic	Republican
Popular vote	245,791	53,219
Percentage	82.2%	17.8%
- County results Brady: 70–80% 80–90%
U.S. Representative before election
Bob Brady
Democratic
Elected U.S. Representative
Bob Brady
Democratic

The 1st district included central and South Philadelphia, the City of Chester, the Philadelphia International Airport and other small sections of Delaware County. The incumbent was Democrat Bob Brady, who had represented the district since 1998. He was re-elected with 83% of the vote in 2014, and the district had a PVI of D+28.

=== Democratic primary ===
Brady was unopposed for the Democratic nomination. Bryan Leib had filed with the FEC and announced his intention to challenge Brady for the Democratic nomination in July 2015, but did not file to run.

==== Candidates ====
===== Nominee =====
- Bob Brady, incumbent U.S. representative

===== Withdrawn =====
- Bryan Leib

==== Primary results ====
Democratic primary results
Party	Candidate	Votes	%
Democratic	Bob Brady (incumbent)	108,233	100.0
Total votes		108,233	100.0

=== Republican primary ===
==== Candidates ====
===== Nominee =====
- Debbie Williams

==== Primary results ====
Republican primary results
Party	Candidate	Votes	%
Republican	Debbie Williams	19,042	100.0
Total votes		19,042	100.0

=== General election ===
==== Endorsements ====
Bob Brady (D)

Labor unions

- AFL-CIO

==== Predictions ====
Source	Ranking	As of
The Cook Political Report	Safe D	November 7, 2016
Daily Kos Elections	Safe D	November 7, 2016
Rothenberg	Safe D	November 3, 2016
Sabato's Crystal Ball	Safe D	November 7, 2016
RCP	Safe D	October 31, 2016

==== Results ====
Pennsylvania's 1st congressional district, 2016
Party	Candidate	Votes	%
Democratic	Bob Brady (incumbent)	245,791	82.2
Republican	Debbie Williams	53,219	17.8
Total votes		299,010	100.0
Democratic hold			

== District 2 ==
2016 Pennsylvania's 2nd congressional district election
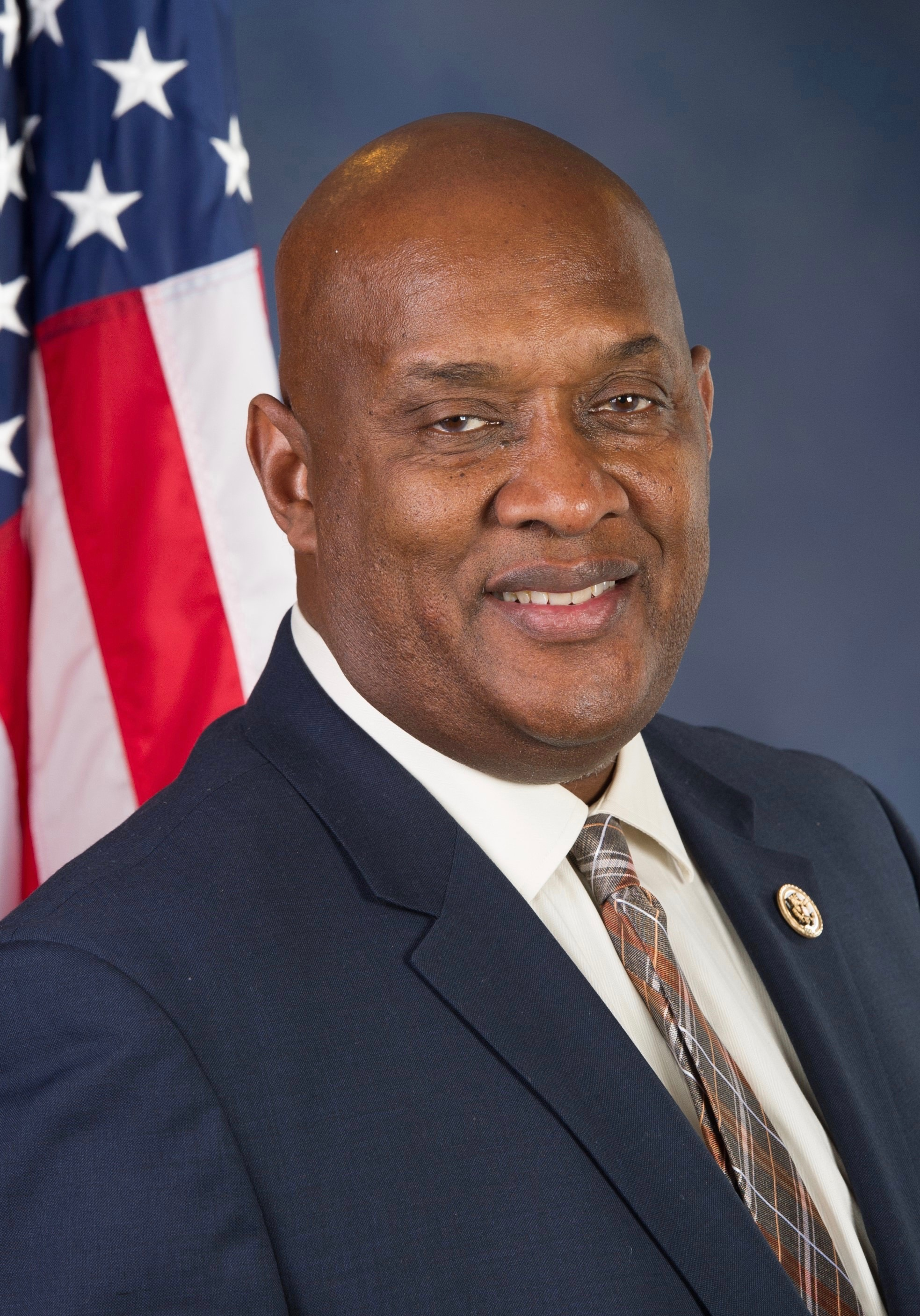

Nominee	Dwight Evans	James Jones
Party	Democratic	Republican
Popular vote	280,439	29,661
Percentage	90.4%	9.6%
- County results Evans: 70–80% 90–100%
U.S. Representative before election
Dwight Evans
Democratic
Elected U.S. Representative
Dwight Evans
Democratic

The 2nd district includes parts of West Philadelphia, North Philadelphia and Northwest Philadelphia in addition to Lower Merion Township in Montgomery County. Incumbent Chaka Fattah, who had represented the district since 1995, was re-elected with 88% of the vote in 2014, and the district had a PVI of D+38.

=== Democratic primary ===
Fattah was defeated in the Democratic primary by state Representative Dwight E. Evans.

==== Candidates ====
===== Nominee =====
- Dwight E. Evans, state representative, candidate for governor in 1994 and candidate for mayor of Philadelphia in 1999 and 2007

===== Eliminated in primary =====
- Chaka Fattah, incumbent U.S. representative
- Brian Gordon, Lower Merion Township commissioner and candidate for PA-06 in 2010
- Dan Muroff, Philadelphia's 9th Ward Democratic leader and former congressional aide

===== Withdrawn =====
- Brian Sims, state representative

==== Endorsements ====
Chaka Fattah (D)

Labor unions

- AFL-CIO

==== Primary results ====
Democratic primary results
Party	Candidate	Votes	%
Democratic	Dwight E. Evans	75,515	42.3
Democratic	Chaka Fattah (incumbent)	61,518	34.4
Democratic	Brian Gordon	23,655	13.2
Democratic	Dan Muroff	18,016	10.1
Total votes		178,704	100.0

=== Republican primary ===
==== Candidates ====
===== Nominee =====
- James Jones, human-resources consulting firm owner

==== Primary results ====
Republican primary results
Party	Candidate	Votes	%
Republican	James Jones	11,838	100.0
Total votes		11,838	100.0

=== Special election ===
On June 23, 2016, two days after being convicted of 22 corruption charges, Fattah resigned his seat in Congress. On July 1, 2016, Governor Tom Wolf announced that a special election would be held on November 8, concurrently with the regularly scheduled election, to fill Fattah's seat for the final eight weeks of the 114th United States Congress.

==== Candidates ====
Democrats

- Dwight E. Evans, state representative, candidate for governor in 1994 and candidate for mayor of Philadelphia in 1999 and 2007

Republicans

- James Jones, human-resources consulting firm owner

Independents

- Milton Street, former state senator and candidate for mayor of Philadelphia in 2007, 2011 and 2015

==== Results ====
Pennsylvania's 2nd congressional district, 2016 (special)
Party	Candidate	Votes	%
Democratic	Dwight E. Evans	280,439	90.4
Republican	James Jones	29,661	9.6
Total votes		310,100	100.0
Democratic hold			

=== General election ===
==== Endorsements ====
Dwight Evans (D)

Labor unions

- AFL-CIO

==== Predictions ====
Source	Ranking	As of
The Cook Political Report	Safe D	November 7, 2016
Daily Kos Elections	Safe D	November 7, 2016
Rothenberg	Safe D	November 3, 2016
Sabato's Crystal Ball	Safe D	November 7, 2016
RCP	Safe D	October 31, 2016

==== Results ====
Pennsylvania's 2nd congressional district, 2016
Party	Candidate	Votes	%
Democratic	Dwight E. Evans	322,514	90.2
Republican	James Jones	35,131	9.8
Total votes		357,645	100.0
Democratic hold			

== District 3 ==
2016 Pennsylvania's 3rd congressional district election
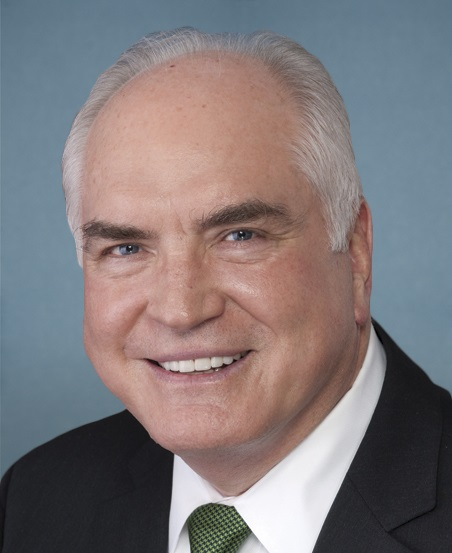
Nominee	Mike Kelly
Party	Republican
Popular vote	244,893
Percentage	100.0%
U.S. representative before election
Mike Kelly
Republican
Elected U.S. representative
Mike Kelly
Republican

The 3rd district was in Northwestern Pennsylvania and included the cities of Erie, Sharon, Hermitage, Butler and Meadville. The incumbent was Republican Mike Kelly, who had represented the district since 2011. He was re-elected with 61% of the vote in 2014, and the district had a PVI of R+8.

=== Republican primary ===
==== Candidates ====
===== Nominee =====
- Mike Kelly, incumbent U.S. representative

==== Primary results ====
Republican primary results
Party	Candidate	Votes	%
Republican	Mike Kelly (incumbent)	88,964	100.0
Total votes		88,964	100.0

==== Predictions ====
Source	Ranking	As of
The Cook Political Report	Safe R	November 7, 2016
Daily Kos Elections	Safe R	November 7, 2016
Rothenberg	Safe R	November 3, 2016
Sabato's Crystal Ball	Safe R	November 7, 2016
RCP	Safe R	October 31, 2016

=== General election ===
==== Results ====
Pennsylvania's 3rd congressional district, 2016
Party	Candidate	Votes	%
Republican	Mike Kelly (incumbent)	244,893	100.0
Total votes		244,893	100.0
Republican hold			

== District 4 ==
2016 Pennsylvania's 4th congressional district election
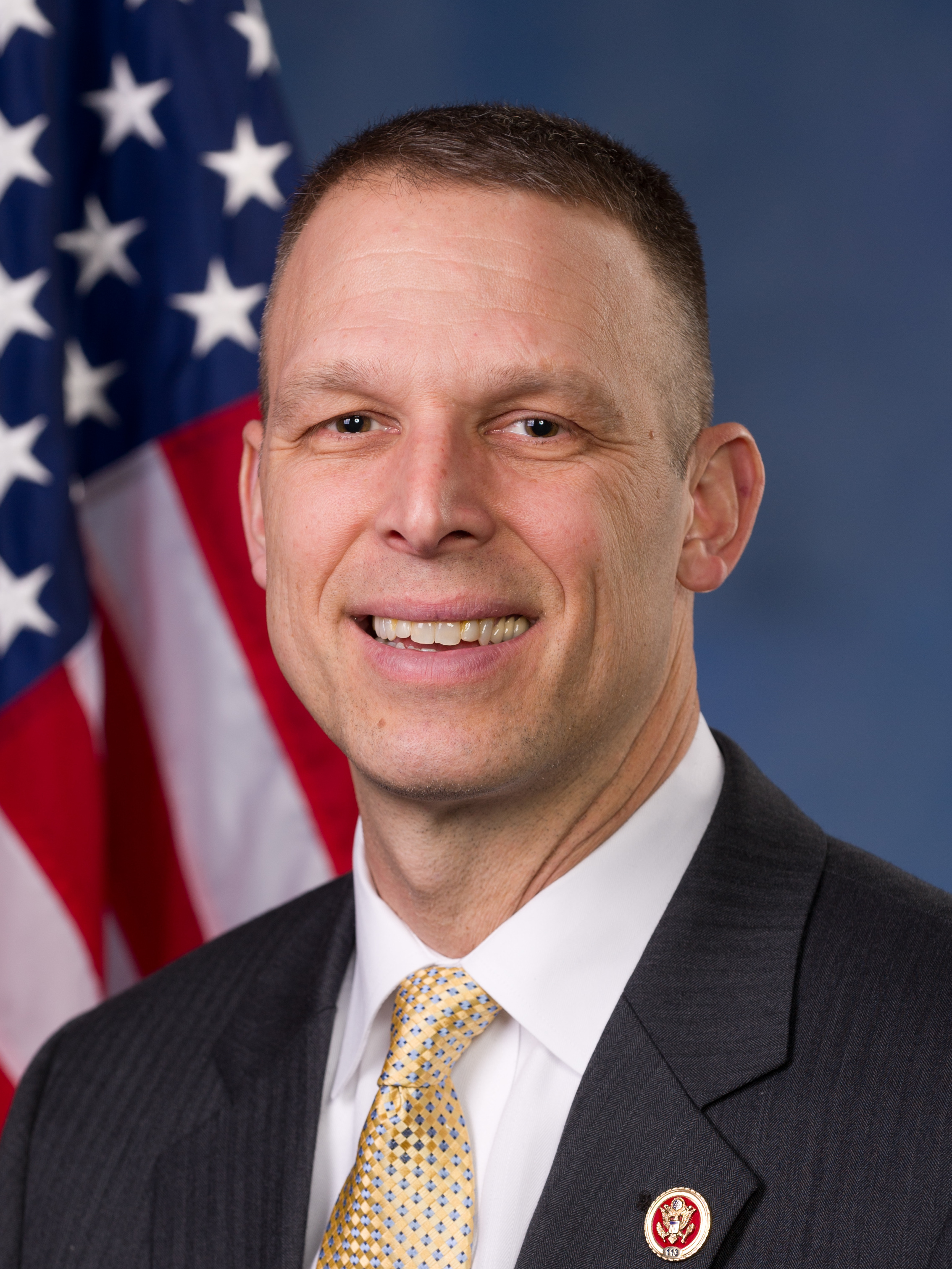

Nominee	Scott Perry	Josh Burkholder
Party	Republican	Democratic
Popular vote	220,628	113,372
Percentage	66.1%	33.9%
- County results Perry: 60–70% 70–80% Burkholder: 80–90%
U.S. Representative before election
Scott Perry
Republican
Elected U.S. Representative
Scott Perry
Republican

The 4th district was in South Central Pennsylvania and included all of Adams and York counties and parts of Cumberland County. The incumbent was Republican Scott Perry, who had represented the district since 2013. He was elected with 75% of the vote in 2014, and the district had a PVI of R+9.

=== Republican primary ===
==== Candidates ====
===== Nominee =====
- Scott Perry, incumbent U.S. representative

==== Primary results ====
Republican primary results
Party	Candidate	Votes	%
Republican	Scott Perry (incumbent)	100,552	100.0
Total votes		100,552	100.0

=== Democratic primary ===
==== Candidates ====
===== Nominee =====
- Josh Burkholder, multimedia digital artist

=== General election ===
==== Predictions ====
Source	Ranking	As of
The Cook Political Report	Safe R	November 7, 2016
Daily Kos Elections	Safe R	November 7, 2016
Rothenberg	Safe R	November 3, 2016
Sabato's Crystal Ball	Safe R	November 7, 2016
RCP	Safe R	October 31, 2016

==== Results ====
Pennsylvania's 4th congressional district, 2016
Party	Candidate	Votes	%
Republican	Scott Perry (incumbent)	220,628	66.1
Democratic	Josh Burkholder	113,372	33.9
Total votes		334,000	100.0
Republican hold			

== District 5 ==
2016 Pennsylvania's 5th congressional district election
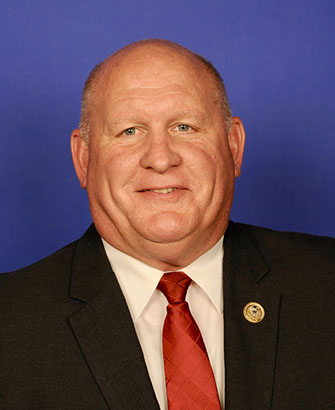

Nominee	Glenn Thompson	Kerith Strano Taylor
Party	Republican	Democratic
Popular vote	206,761	101,082
Percentage	67.2%	32.8%
- County results Thompson: 50–60% 70–80% 80–90%
U.S. representative before election
Glenn Thompson
Republican
Elected U.S. representative
Glenn Thompson
Republican

The 5th district, the state's largest and most sparsely populated, was in North Central Pennsylvania and included all of Cameron, Centre, Clarion, Clinton, Elk, Forest, Huntingdon, Jefferson, McKean and Potter counties and parts of Clearfield, Crawford, Erie, Tioga, Warren and Venango counties. The incumbent was Republican Glenn Thompson, who had represented the district since 2009. He was re-elected with 64% of the vote in 2014, and the district had a PVI of R+8.

=== Republican primary ===
==== Candidates ====
===== Nominee =====
- Glenn Thompson, incumbent U.S. representative

==== Primary results ====
Republican primary results
Party	Candidate	Votes	%
Republican	Glenn Thompson (incumbent)	89,000	100.0
Total votes		89,000	100.0

=== Democratic primary ===
==== Candidates ====
===== Nominee =====
- Kerith Strano Taylor, family law attorney and nominee for this seat in 2014

==== Primary results ====
Democratic primary results
Party	Candidate	Votes	%
Democratic	Kerith Strano Taylor	56,696	100.0
Total votes		56,696	100.0

=== General election ===
==== Debate ====
2016 Pennsylvania's 5th congressional district debate
No.	Date	Host	Moderator	Link	Republican	Democratic
Key: P Participant A Absent N Not invited I Invited W Withdrawn						
Key: P Participant A Absent N Not invited I Invited W Withdrawn					Glenn Thompson	Kerith Strano Taylor
1	Oct. 16, 2016	WPSU-TV	Patty Satalia		P	P

==== Endorsements ====
Kerith Strano Taylor (D)

Labor unions

- AFL-CIO

==== Predictions ====
Source	Ranking	As of
The Cook Political Report	Safe R	November 7, 2016
Daily Kos Elections	Safe R	November 7, 2016
Rothenberg	Safe R	November 3, 2016
Sabato's Crystal Ball	Safe R	November 7, 2016
RCP	Safe R	October 31, 2016

==== Results ====
Pennsylvania's 5th congressional district, 2016
Party	Candidate	Votes	%
Republican	Glenn Thompson (incumbent)	206,761	67.2
Democratic	Kerith Strano Taylor	101,082	32.8
Total votes		307,843	100.0
Republican hold			

== District 6 ==
2016 Pennsylvania's 6th congressional district election
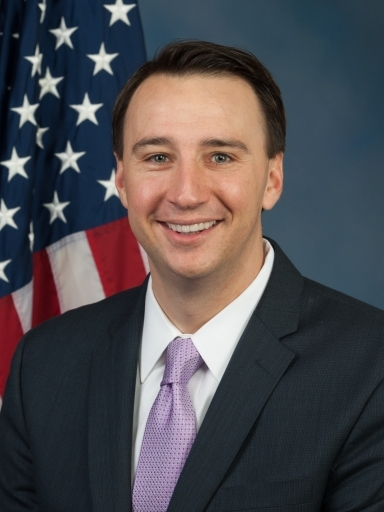

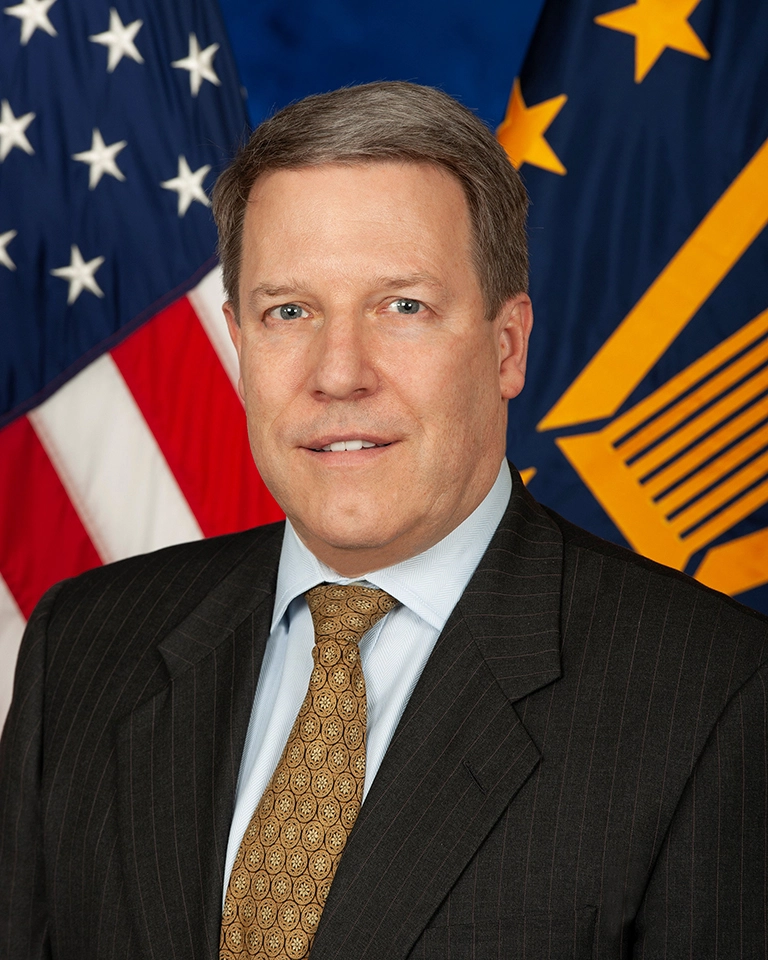
Nominee	Ryan Costello	Michael Parrish
Party	Republican	Democratic
Popular vote	207,469	155,000
Percentage	57.2%	42.8%
- County results Costello: 50–60% 60–70%
U.S. Representative before election
Ryan Costello
Republican
Elected U.S. Representative
Ryan Costello
Republican

The 6th district included communities north and west of the City of Philadelphia. The incumbent was Republican Ryan Costello, who had represented the district since 2015. He was elected with 56% of the vote in 2014, succeeding retiring Republican Jim Gerlach, and the district had a PVI of R+2.

=== Republican primary ===
==== Candidates ====
===== Nominee =====
- Ryan Costello, incumbent U.S. representative

==== Primary results ====
Republican primary results
Party	Candidate	Votes	%
Republican	Ryan Costello (incumbent)	88,349	100.0
Total votes		88,349	100.0

=== Democratic primary ===
==== Candidates ====
===== Nominee =====
- Michael Parrish, businessman, retired US Army colonel and candidate for this seat in 2014

===== Withdrawn =====
- Lindy Li, financial manager (failed to qualify for ballot placement)

==== Endorsements ====
Mike Parrish

U.S. Representatives

- Joe Hoeffel, former U.S. representative

Statewide officials

- Ed Rendell, former governor of Pennsylvania

State legislators

- Tim Briggs, state representative
- Mary Jo Daley, state representative
- Madeleine Dean, state representative
- Andy Dinniman, state senator and former Chester County Commissioner
- Paul Drucker, former state representative
- Tom Houghton, former state representative and nominee for PA-16 seat in 2014
- Vincent Hughes, state senator
- Daylin Leach, state senator and candidate for PA-13 in 2014
- Steve McCarter, state representative
- Barbara McIlvaine Smith, former state representative
- Mark Painter, former state representative
- Mark Rozzi, state representative
- Josh Shapiro, chairman of the Montgomery County Board of Commissioners and former state representative

Organizations

- Chester County Democratic Committee
- Montgomery County Democratic Committee

Local officials

- David Burton, mayor of Malvern
- Kathi Cozzone, Chester County commissioner
- Josh Maxwell, mayor of Downingtown
- Jackie Parker, former mayor of Lebanon
- Wiley P. Parker, president of the Lebanon City Council
- Leo Scoda, former mayor of Phoenixville
- Mike Speck, mayor of Phoenixville
- Dan Weand, president of the Pottstown Borough Council
- Cornell Wilson, Lebanon City Council member

Individuals

- Joe Foster, chairman of the Montgomery County Democratic Committee
- Lani Frank, chair of the Pennsylvania State Democratic Committee Progressive Caucus and vice chair of the Chester County Democratic Committee
- Tom Herman, former chairman of the Berks County Democratic Committee
- Alan Kennedy-Shaffer, chair of the Pennsylvania State Democratic Committee Veterans Caucus
- Brian McGinnis, chairman of the Chester County Democratic Committee
- Bob Roggio, candidate for this seat in 2008
- Chris Tarsa, former chair of the Lebanon County Democratic Committee
- Michele Vaughn, former chair of the Chester County Democratic Committee
Lindy Li (withdrawn)

U.S. Representatives

- Bob Brady, U.S. representative and chairman of the Philadelphia Democratic City Committee
- Matt Cartwright, U.S. representative (PA-17)
- Mike Honda, U.S. representative (CA-17)
- Ted Lieu, U.S. representative (CA-33)
- Grace Meng, U.S. representative (NY-06)

Statewide officials

- Jonathan Saidel, former Philadelphia Controller and candidate for lieutenant governor in 2010

Labor unions

- International Association of Machinists Local 1776
- Plumbers Union Local 690

Local officials

- Ruth Damsker, Pennsylvania State Democratic Committee member, former Montgomery County commissioner and State Senate candidate in 2010 and 2014
- Brad Kirsch, senior caucus chair of the Pennsylvania Democratic Party
- Candace Stitzman-Duley, women's caucus chair of the Pennsylvania Democratic Party

==== Primary results ====
Democratic primary results
Party	Candidate	Votes	%
Democratic	Mike Parrish	62,732	100.0
Total votes		62,732	100.0

=== General election ===
==== Endorsements ====
Mike Parrish (D)

U.S. Representatives

- Joe Hoeffel, former U.S. representative

Statewide officials

- Ed Rendell, former governor of Pennsylvania

State legislators

- Tim Briggs, state representative
- Mary Jo Daley, state representative
- Madeleine Dean, state representative
- Andy Dinniman, state senator and former Chester County commissioner
- Paul Drucker, former state representative
- Tom Houghton, former state representative and nominee for PA-16 seat in 2014
- Vincent Hughes, state senator
- Daylin Leach, state senator and candidate for PA-13 in 2014
- Steve McCarter, state representative
- Barbara McIlvaine Smith, former state representative
- Mark Painter, former state representative
- Mark Rozzi, state representative
- Josh Shapiro, chairman of the Montgomery County Board of commissioners and former state representative

Labor unions

- AFL-CIO

==== Predictions ====
Source	Ranking	As of
The Cook Political Report	Likely R	November 7, 2016
Daily Kos Elections	Safe R	November 7, 2016
Rothenberg	Safe R	November 3, 2016
Sabato's Crystal Ball	Safe R	November 7, 2016
RCP	Likely R	October 31, 2016

==== Results ====
Pennsylvania's 6th congressional district, 2016
Party	Candidate	Votes	%
Republican	Ryan Costello (incumbent)	207,469	57.2
Democratic	Mike Parrish	155,000	42.8
Total votes		362,469	100.0
Republican hold			

== District 7 ==
2016 Pennsylvania's 7th congressional district election
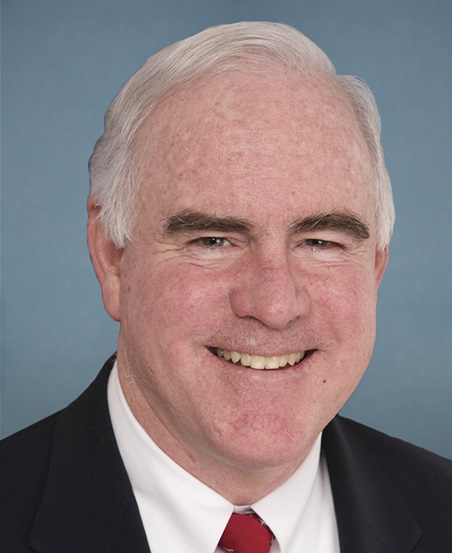

Nominee	Pat Meehan	Mary Ellen Balchunis
Party	Republican	Democratic
Popular vote	225,678	153,824
Percentage	59.5%	40.5%
- County results Meehan: 50–60% 60–70% 70–80%
U.S. Representative before election
Pat Meehan
Republican
Elected U.S. Representative
Pat Meehan
Republican

The 7th district was in the Philadelphia suburbs, including most of Delaware County along with portions of Chester, Montgomery, Berks and Lancaster counties. The incumbent was Republican Pat Meehan, who had represented the district since 2011. He was re-elected with 62% of the vote in 2014, and the district had a PVI of R+2.

=== Republican primary ===
==== Candidates ====
===== Nominee =====
- Pat Meehan, incumbent U.S. representative

===== Eliminated in primary =====
- Stan Casacio, businessman and former Cheltenham Town Councilman

==== Primary results ====
Republican primary results
Party	Candidate	Votes	%
Republican	Pat Meehan (incumbent)	86,178	76.4
Republican	Stan Casacio	26,674	23.6
Total votes		112,852	100.0

=== Democratic primary ===
==== Candidates ====
===== Nominee =====
- Mary Ellen Balchunis, college professor and nominee for this seat in 2014

===== Eliminated in primary =====
- Bill Golderer, pastor and founder of Broad Street Ministry

===== Withdrawn =====
- Lindy Li, financial analyst (running for PA-06)
- Dave Naples, database administrator, 2007 candidate for Skippack Township Board of Supervisors and 2014 write-in candidate for governor (running for state house)

===== Endorsements =====
Mary Ellen Balchunis

Labor unions

- AFL-CIO

Organizations

- Chester County Democratic Committee
- Montgomery County Democratic Committee

==== Primary results ====
Democratic primary results
Party	Candidate	Votes	%
Democratic	Mary Ellen Balchunis	52,792	74.0
Democratic	Bill Golderer	18,509	26.0
Total votes		71,301	100.0

=== General election ===
==== Endorsements ====
Mary Ellen Balchunis (D)

Labor unions

- AFL-CIO

==== Predictions ====
Source	Ranking	As of
The Cook Political Report	Safe R	November 7, 2016
Daily Kos Elections	Safe R	November 7, 2016
Rothenberg	Safe R	November 3, 2016
Sabato's Crystal Ball	Safe R	November 7, 2016
RCP	Safe R	October 31, 2016

==== Results ====
Pennsylvania's 7th congressional district, 2016
Party	Candidate	Votes	%
Republican	Pat Meehan (incumbent)	225,678	59.5
Democratic	Mary Ellen Balchunis	153,824	40.5
Total votes		379,502	100.0
Republican hold			

== District 8 ==
2016 Pennsylvania's 8th congressional district election
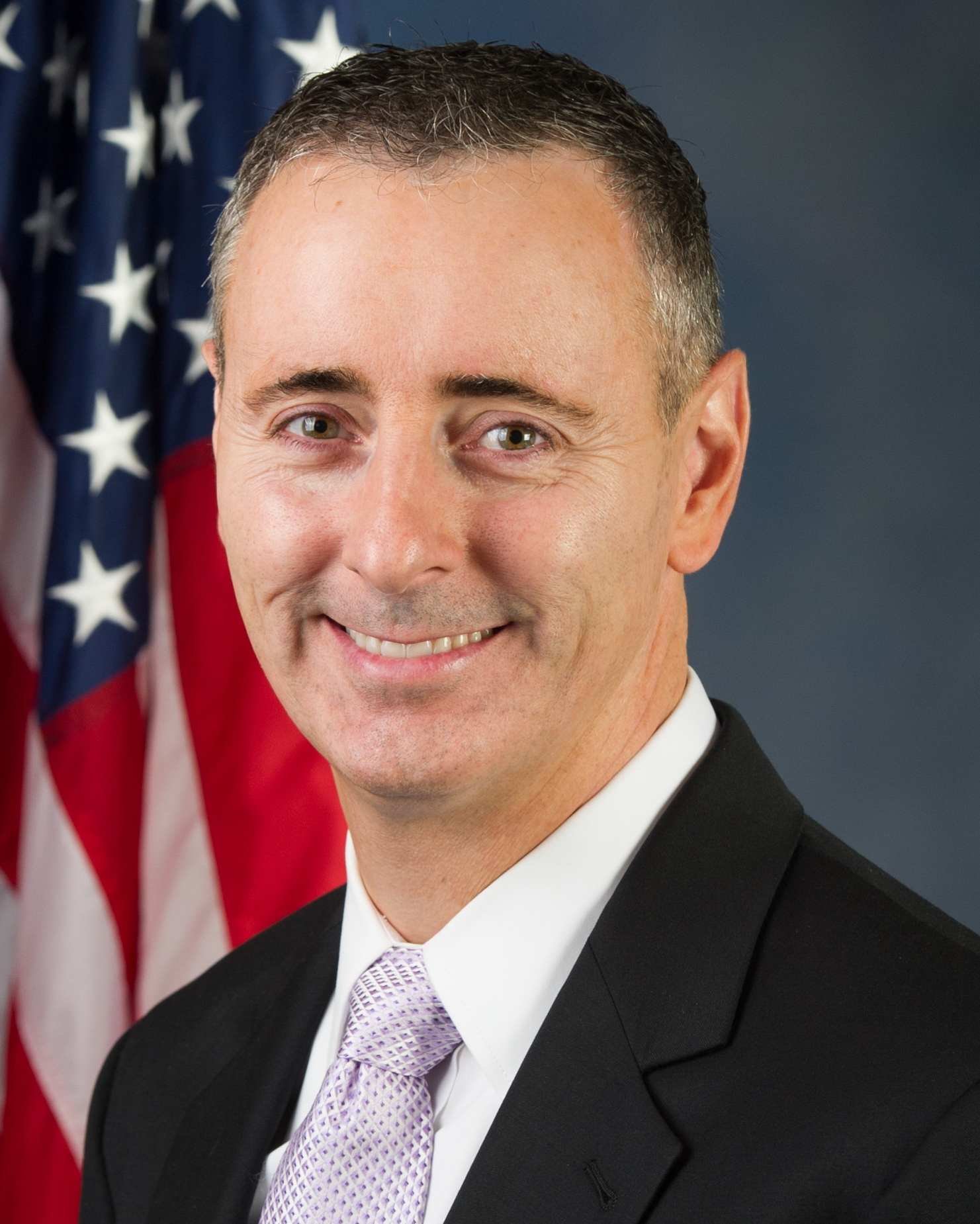

Nominee	Brian Fitzpatrick	Steve Santarsiero
Party	Republican	Democratic
Popular vote	207,263	173,555
Percentage	54.4%	45.6%
- County results Fitzpatrick: 50–60%
U.S. Representative before election
Mike Fitzpatrick
Republican
Elected U.S. Representative
Brian Fitzpatrick
Republican

The 8th district was in Southeastern Pennsylvania and included Bucks County, along with portions of Montgomery County. The incumbent was Republican Mike Fitzpatrick, who had represented the district since 2011, and previously represented it from 2005 to 2007. He was re-elected with 62% of the vote in 2014, and the district had a PVI of R+1.

=== Republican primary ===
Fitzpatrick, a supporter of term limits, had pledged to limit himself to four terms in the House and did not run for re-election.

==== Candidates ====
===== Nominee =====
- Brian Fitzpatrick, retired FBI agent and brother of Congressman Mike Fitzpatrick

===== Eliminated in primary =====
- Marc Duome, psychologist and businessman
- Andy Warren, former Bucks County Commissioner

===== Withdrawn =====
- Dean Malik, former Bucks County assistant district attorney and candidate in 2010
- Scott Petri, state representative
- Brian Thomas, marketing consultant

===== Declined =====
- Jim Cawley, former lieutenant governor
- Gene DiGirolamo, state representative
- Mike Fitzpatrick, incumbent U.S. representative
- Rob Loughery, Bucks County commissioner
- Tom Manion, businessman and nominee in 2008
- Chuck McIlhinney, state senator

==== Primary results ====
Republican primary results
Party	Candidate	Votes	%
Republican	Brian Fitzpatrick	74,150	78.37
Republican	Andy Warren	11,828	12.50
Republican	Marc Duome	8,641	9.13
Total votes		94,619	100.00

=== Democratic primary ===
==== Candidates ====
===== Nominee =====
- Steve Santarsiero, state representative

===== Eliminated in primary =====
- Shaughnessy Naughton, chemist, businesswoman and candidate for this seat in 2014

Declined

- Diane Marseglia, Bucks County Commissioner (endorsed Santarsiero)
- Patrick Murphy, former U.S. representative and candidate for attorney general in 2012
- Kevin Strouse, United States Army Ranger and nominee for this seat in 2014 (endorsed Santarsiero)

===== Endorsements =====
Shaughnessy Naughton

U.S. representatives

- Matt Cartwright, U.S. representative (PA-17)

Statewide officials

- Ed Rendell, former governor of Pennsylvania

Organizations

- Climate Hawks Vote
- Council for a Livable World
- EMILY's List
Steve Santarsiero

U.S. representatives

- Bob Brady, U.S. representative and chairman of the Philadelphia Democratic City Committee
- Joe Hoeffel, former U.S. representative
- Peter H. Kostmayer, former U.S. representative

Statewide officials

- Eugene DePasquale, Pennsylvania Auditor General
- Jonathan Saidel, former Philadelphia Controller and candidate for lieutenant governor in 2010
- Tom Wolf, governor of Pennsylvania

State legislators

- Matt Bradford, state representative
- Tina Davis, state representative
- Madeleine Dean, state representative
- John Galloway, state representative
- Josh Shapiro, chairman of the Montgomery County Board of Commissioners and former state representative
- Matt Smith, former state senator

Labor unions

- AFL-CIO
- International Brotherhood of Electrical Workers, Local 269
- International Brotherhood of Electrical Workers, Local 98
- Laborers' District Council of the Philadelphia Metropolitan Area
- Laborers' Union, Local 57
- National Education Association
- Pennsylvania Association of Nurses And Practitioners (PASNAP)
- Plumbers Union Local 690
- Sheet Metal Workers, Local 19
- Union of Food and Commercial Workers Local 1776
- Union of Roofers, Waterproofers, and Allied Workers, Local 30
- United Steelworkers

Organizations

- Bristol Township Democratic Committee
- Montgomery County Democratic Committee
- Solebury Democrats

Local officials

- Det Ansinn, president of the Doylestown Borough Council
- Diane Marseglia, Bucks County Commissioner
- Ron Strouse, Mayor of Doylestown

Individuals

- Kathy Boockvar, attorney and nominee for this seat in 2012
- Kevin Strouse, Army Ranger and nominee for this seat in 2014

==== Primary results ====
Democratic primary results
Party	Candidate	Votes	%
Democratic	Steve Santarsiero	50,416	59.82
Democratic	Shaughnessy Naughton	33,864	40.18
Total votes		84,280	100.00

=== General election ===
==== Endorsements ====
Brian Fitzpatrick (R)

Organizations

- National Republican Congressional Committee "Young Guns" Program
- United States Chamber of Commerce
Steve Santarsiero (D)

U.S. Representatives

- Bob Brady, U.S. representative and chairman of the Philadelphia Democratic City Committee
- Joe Hoeffel, former U.S. representative
- Peter H. Kostmayer, former U.S. representative

Statewide officials

- Eugene DePasquale, Pennsylvania Auditor General
- Jonathan Saidel, former Philadelphia Controller and candidate for lieutenant governor in 2010
- Tom Wolf, Governor of Pennsylvania

State legislators

- Matt Bradford, state representative
- Tina Davis, state representative
- Madeleine Dean, state representative
- John Galloway, state representative
- Josh Shapiro, chairman of the Montgomery County Board of Commissioners and former state representative
- Matt Smith, former state senator

Labor unions

- AFL-CIO
- International Brotherhood of Electrical Workers, Local 269
- International Brotherhood of Electrical Workers, Local 98
- Laborers' District Council of the Philadelphia Metropolitan Area
- Laborers' Union, Local 57
- National Education Association
- Pennsylvania Association of Nurses And Practitioners (PASNAP)
- Plumbers Union Local 690
- Sheet Metal Workers, Local 19
- Union of Food and Commercial Workers Local 1776
- Union of Roofers, Waterproofers, and Allied Workers, Local 30
- United Steelworkers

Organizations

- Democratic Congressional Campaign Committee "Red to Blue" Program

==== Polling ====
Poll source	Date(s) administered	Sample size	Margin of error	Brian Fitzpatrick (R)	Steve Santarsiero (D)	Undecided
Communication Concepts	September 6–7, 2016	416	± 5%	50%	38%	12%

==== Predictions ====
Source	Ranking	As of
The Cook Political Report	Tossup	November 7, 2016
Daily Kos Elections	Tossup	November 7, 2016
Rothenberg	Tossup	November 3, 2016
Sabato's Crystal Ball	Lean R	November 7, 2016
RCP	Tossup	October 31, 2016

==== Results ====
Pennsylvania's 8th congressional district, 2016
Party	Candidate	Votes	%
Republican	Brian Fitzpatrick	207,263	54.43
Democratic	Steve Santarsiero	173,555	45.57
Total votes		380,818	100.00
Republican hold			

== District 9 ==
2016 Pennsylvania's 9th congressional district election
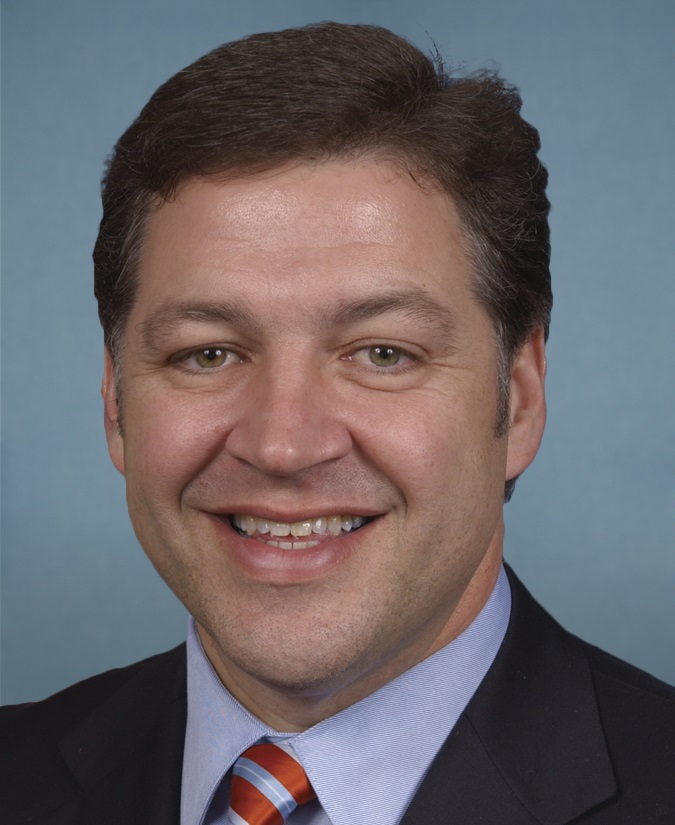

Nominee	Bill Shuster	Arthur L Halvorson
Party	Republican	Democratic
Popular vote	186,580	107,985
Percentage	63.3%	36.7%
- County results Shuster: 50–60% 60–70% 70–80% 80–90% Halvorson: 50–60%
U.S. representative before election
Bill Shuster
Republican
Elected U.S. representative
Bill Shuster
Republican

The 9th district was in South Central Pennsylvania and included Cambria, Blair, Huntingdon, Franklin, Fulton, Bedford, Somerset, Fayette, Greene and Washington counties. The incumbent was Republican Bill Shuster, who had represented the district since 2001. He was re-elected with 64% of the vote in 2014, and the district had a PVI of R+14.

=== Republican primary ===
Shuster, the chairman of the House Committee on Transportation and Infrastructure, was challenged in the 2014 Republican primary by two candidates, Art Halvorson and Travis Schooley, unhappy with his support for earmarks that bring projects to the district. Halvorson and Schooley both were considering running again.

On April 24, 2015, The Hill reported that businessman Tom Smith, who self-funded a 2012 U.S. Senate campaign, was considering a primary challenge of Shuster. Halvorson had pledged that he would not run if Smith did and would support him. In July, Smith announced he would not run, citing unexpected health concerns. After Smith declined to run, Halvorson announced he would run again. On October 17, 2015, Smith died.

==== Candidates ====
===== Nominee =====
- Bill Shuster, incumbent U.S. representative

===== Eliminated in primary =====
- Art Halvorson, businessman, Coast Guard veteran and candidate for this seat in 2014

===== Declined =====
- Tom Smith, businessman and nominee for U.S. Senate in 2012

==== Endorsements ====
Bill Shuster

U.S. Representatives

- Mark Meadows, U.S. representative (NC-11)

==== Primary results ====
Republican primary results
Party	Candidate	Votes	%
Republican	Bill Shuster (incumbent)	49,393	50.6
Republican	Arthur L Halvorson	48,166	49.4
Total votes		97,559	100.0

=== Democratic primary ===
While no Democrat appeared on the ballot, Arthur Halvorson, who lost in the Republican primary, received enough Democratic write-in votes to be the Democratic nominee; Halvorson vowed to caucus as a conservative Republican if elected.

=== General election ===
==== Predictions ====
Source	Ranking	As of
The Cook Political Report	Safe R	November 7, 2016
Daily Kos Elections	Safe R	November 7, 2016
Rothenberg	Safe R	November 3, 2016
Sabato's Crystal Ball	Safe R	November 7, 2016
RCP	Safe R	October 31, 2016

==== Results ====
Pennsylvania's 9th congressional district, 2016
Party	Candidate	Votes	%
Republican	Bill Shuster (incumbent)	186,580	63.3
Democratic	Arthur L Halvorson	107,985	36.7
Total votes		294,565	100.0
Republican hold			

== District 10 ==
2016 Pennsylvania's 10th congressional district election
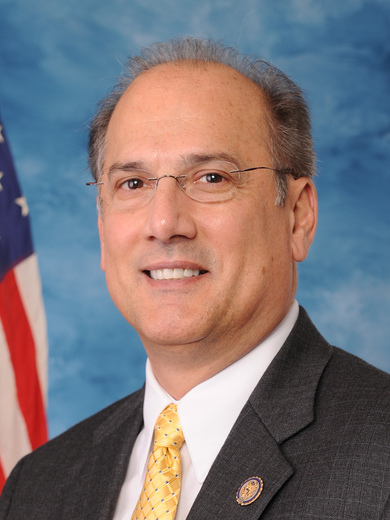

Nominee	Tom Marino	Mike Molesevich
Party	Republican	Democratic
Popular vote	211,282	89,823
Percentage	70.2%	29.8%
- County results Marino: 50–60% 60–70% 70–80% 80–90% Molesevich: 50–60%
U.S. Representative before election
Tom Marino
Republican
Elected U.S. Representative
Tom Marino
Republican

The 10th district was in Northeastern Pennsylvania and included Monroe, Pike, Lackawanna, Wayne, Susquehanna, Bradford, Tioga, Sullivan, Lycoming, Union, Columbia, Snyder, Mifflin, Juniata and Perry counties. The incumbent was Republican Tom Marino, who had represented the district since 2011. He was re-elected with 63% of the vote in 2014.

=== Republican primary ===
==== Candidates ====
===== Nominee =====
- Tom Marino, incumbent U.S. representative

==== Primary results ====
Republican primary results
Party	Candidate	Votes	%
Republican	Tom Marino (incumbent)	95,321	100.0
Total votes		95,321	100.0

=== Democratic primary ===
After no candidate stepped forward initially to run for the seat, three write in candidates announced to vie for the Democratic nomination. Former Lewisburg Mayor and environmental consultant, Mike Molesevich, Bucknell graduate student, Steve Belskie, and Justin Sheare all sought the Democratic nomination.

==== Candidates ====
===== Nominee =====
- Mike Molesevich, former mayor of Lewisburg and environmental consultant

Jerry Kaines, a Lycoming County building materials salesman, had formed an exploratory committee for a potential Independent campaign.

=== General election ===
==== Predictions ====
Source	Ranking	As of
The Cook Political Report	Safe R	November 7, 2016
Daily Kos Elections	Safe R	November 7, 2016
Rothenberg	Safe R	November 3, 2016
Sabato's Crystal Ball	Safe R	November 7, 2016
RCP	Safe R	October 31, 2016

==== Results ====
Pennsylvania's 10th congressional district, 2016
Party	Candidate	Votes	%
Republican	Tom Marino (incumbent)	211,282	70.2
Democratic	Mike Molesevich	89,823	29.8
Total votes		301,105	100.0
Republican hold			

== District 11 ==
2016 Pennsylvania's 11th congressional district election
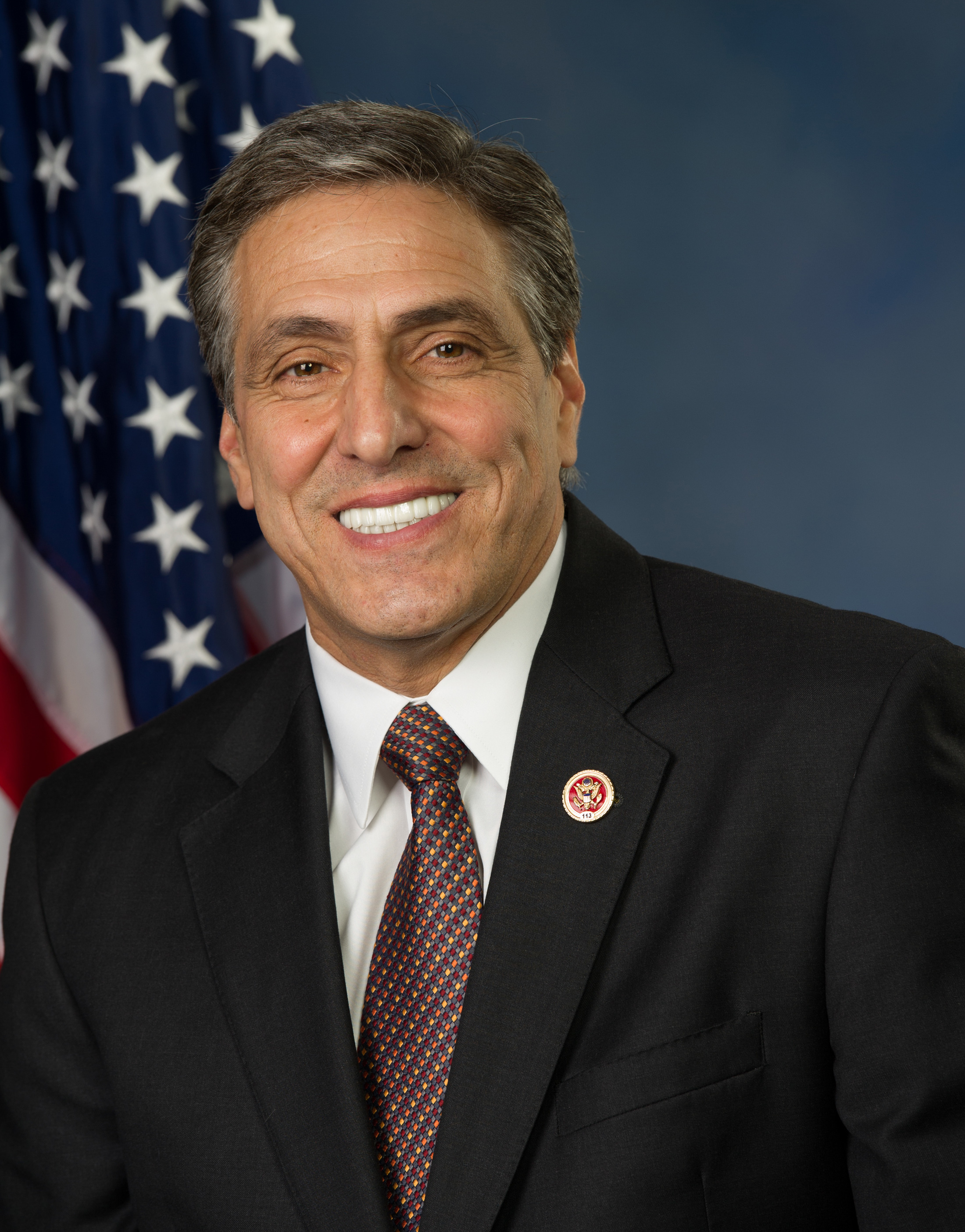

Nominee	Lou Barletta	Michael Marsicano
Party	Republican	Democratic
Popular vote	113,800	199,421
Percentage	63.7%	36.3%
- County results Barletta: 50–60% 60–70% 70–80%
U.S. Representative before election
Lou Barletta
Republican
Elected U.S. Representative
Lou Barletta
Republican

The 11th district was in Northeastern Pennsylvania and included Wyoming, Luzerne, Columbia, Carbon, Northumberland, Dauphin, Perry and Cumberland counties. The incumbent was Republican Lou Barletta, who had represented the district since 2011. He was re-elected with 66% of the vote in 2014, and the district had a PVI of R+6.

=== Republican primary ===
==== Candidates ====
===== Nominee =====
- Lou Barletta, incumbent U.S. representative

==== Primary results ====
Republican primary results
Party	Candidate	Votes	%
Republican	Lou Barletta (incumbent)	92,342	100.0
Total votes		92,342	100.0

=== Democratic primary ===
==== Candidates ====
===== Nominee =====
- Michael Marsicano, former mayor of Hazleton

==== Primary results ====
Democratic primary results
Party	Candidate	Votes	%
Democratic	Michael Marsicano	58,117	100.0
Total votes		58,117	100.0

=== General election ===
==== Endorsements ====
Michael Marsicano (D)

Labor unions

- AFL-CIO

==== Predictions ====
Source	Ranking	As of
The Cook Political Report	Safe R	November 7, 2016
Daily Kos Elections	Safe R	November 7, 2016
Rothenberg	Safe R	November 3, 2016
Sabato's Crystal Ball	Safe R	November 7, 2016
RCP	Safe R	October 31, 2016

==== Results ====
Pennsylvania's 11th congressional district, 2016
Party	Candidate	Votes	%
Republican	Lou Barletta (incumbent)	199,421	63.7
Democratic	Michael Marsicano	113,800	36.3
Total votes		313,221	100.0
Republican hold			

== District 12 ==
2016 Pennsylvania's 12th congressional district election
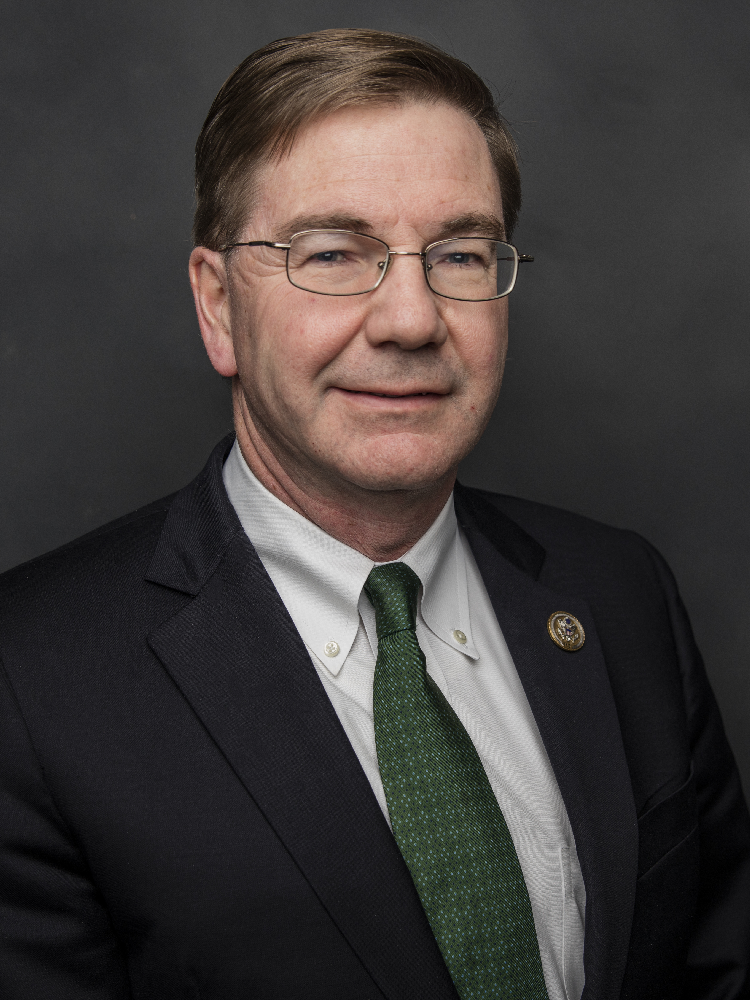

Nominee	Keith Rothfus	Erin McClelland
Party	Republican	Democratic
Popular vote	221,851	137,353
Percentage	61.8%	38.2%
- County results Rothfus: 50–60% 60–70% 70–80%
U.S. Representative before election
Keith Rothfus
Republican
Elected U.S. Representative
Keith Rothfus
Republican

The 12th district was in Southwestern Pennsylvania and included all of Beaver County and parts of Allegheny, Cambria, Lawrence, Somerset and Westmoreland counties. The incumbent was Republican Keith Rothfus, who had represented the district since 2013. He was re-elected with 59% of the vote in 2014, and the district had a PVI of R+9.

=== Republican primary ===
==== Candidates ====
===== Nominee =====
- Keith Rothfus, incumbent U.S. representative

==== Primary results ====
Republican primary results
Party	Candidate	Votes	%
Republican	Keith Rothfus (incumbent)	87,270	100.0
Total votes		87,270	100.0

=== Democratic primary ===
==== Candidates ====
===== Nominee =====
- Erin McClelland, psychologist, businesswoman and nominee for this seat in 2014

===== Withdrawn =====
- Steve Larchuk, attorney, renewable energy business owner and candidate for the 4th district in 2004

==== Endorsements ====
Steve Larchuk (withdrawn)

Labor unions

- Pittsburgh Regional Building and Construction Trades Council
Erin McClelland

Labor unions

- Pittsburgh Regional Building and Construction Trades Council
- United Steelworkers Local 1211

==== Primary results ====
Democratic primary results
Party	Candidate	Votes	%
Democratic	Erin Mcclelland	73,326	100.0
Total votes		73,326	100.0

=== General election ===
Erin McClelland (D)

Labor unions

- AFL-CIO
- Pittsburgh Regional Building and Construction Trades Council
- United Steelworkers Local 1211

==== Predictions ====
Source	Ranking	As of
The Cook Political Report	Safe R	November 7, 2016
Daily Kos Elections	Safe R	November 7, 2016
Rothenberg	Safe R	November 3, 2016
Sabato's Crystal Ball	Safe R	November 7, 2016
RCP	Safe R	October 31, 2016

==== Results ====
Pennsylvania's 12th congressional district, 2016
Party	Candidate	Votes	%
Republican	Keith Rothfus (incumbent)	221,851	61.8
Democratic	Erin Mcclelland	137,353	38.2
Total votes		359,204	100.0
Republican hold			

== District 13 ==
2016 Pennsylvania's 13th congressional district election
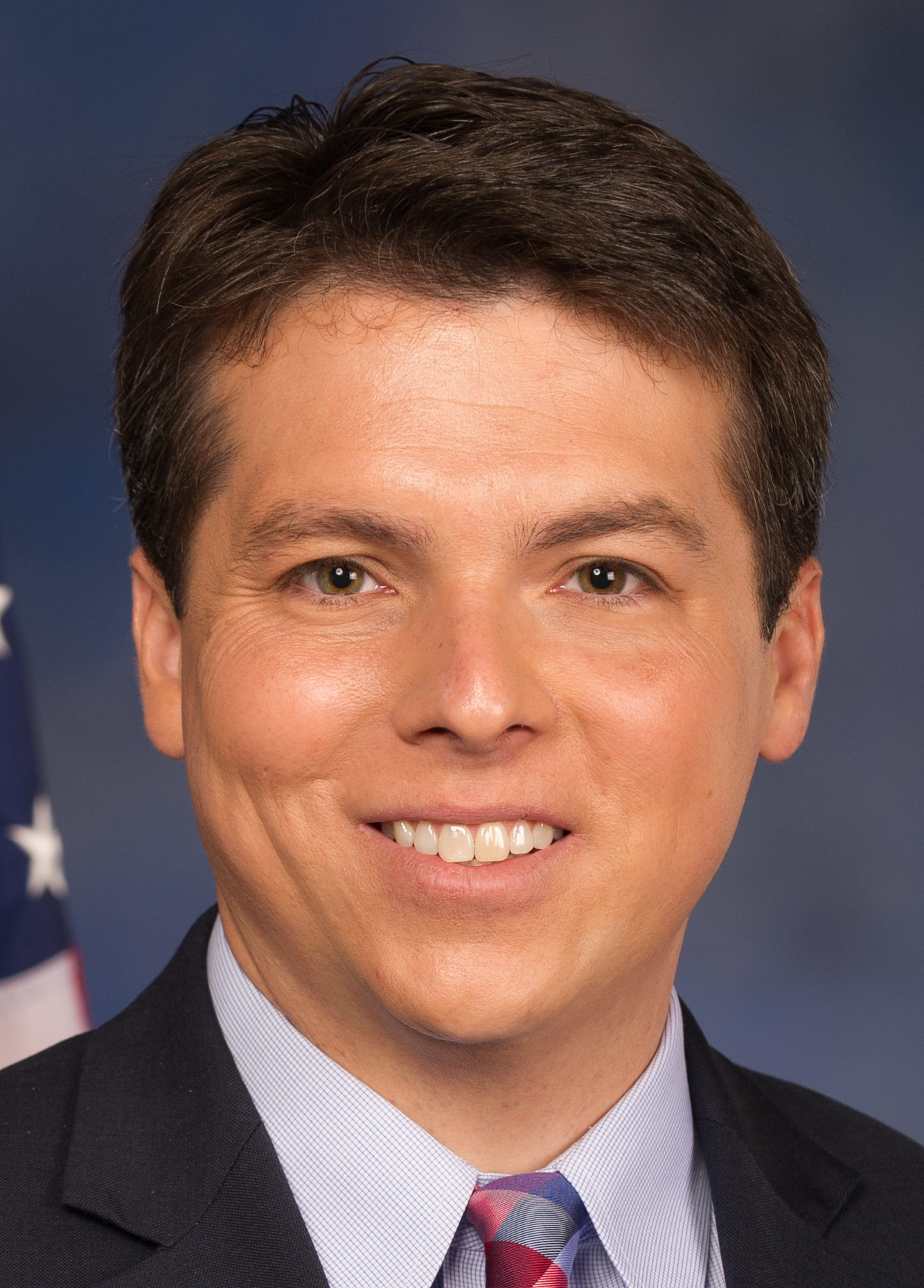
Nominee	Brendan Boyle
Party	Democratic
Popular vote	239,316
Percentage	100.0%
U.S. Representative before election
Brendan Boyle
Democratic
Elected U.S. Representative
Brendan Boyle
Democratic

The 13th district was in Southeastern Pennsylvania, covering eastern Montgomery County and Northeast Philadelphia. The incumbent was Democrat Brendan Boyle, who had represented the district since 2015. He was elected with 67% of the vote in 2014, succeeding retiring Democrat Allyson Schwartz, and the district had a PVI of D+13.

=== Democratic primary ===
==== Candidates ====
===== Nominee =====
- Brendan Boyle, incumbent U.S. representative

==== Primary results ====
Democratic primary results
Party	Candidate	Votes	%
Democratic	Brendan Boyle (incumbent)	90,512	100.0
Total votes		90,512	100.0

=== Republican primary ===
==== Candidates ====
===== Nominee =====
- Armond James

=== General election ===
==== Endorsements ====
Brendan Boyle (D)

Labor unions

- AFL-CIO

==== Predictions ====
Source	Ranking	As of
The Cook Political Report	Safe D	November 7, 2016
Daily Kos Elections	Safe D	November 7, 2016
Rothenberg	Safe D	November 3, 2016
Sabato's Crystal Ball	Safe D	November 7, 2016
RCP	Safe D	October 31, 2016

==== Results ====
Pennsylvania's 13th congressional district, 2016
Party	Candidate	Votes	%
Democratic	Brendan Boyle (incumbent)	239,316	100.0
Total votes		239,316	100.0
Democratic hold			

== District 14 ==
2016 Pennsylvania's 14th congressional district election
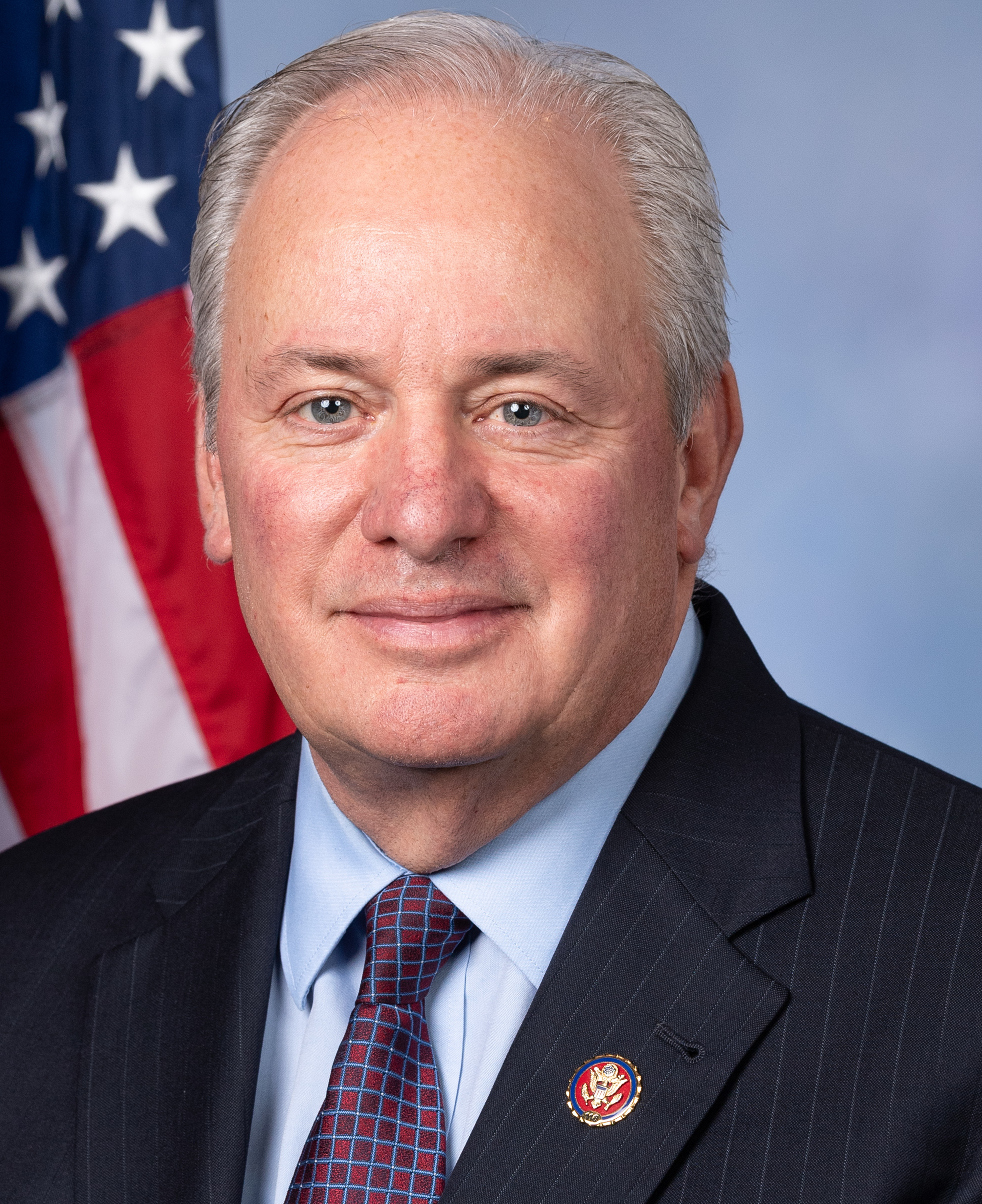

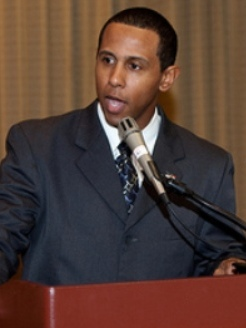
Nominee	Mike Doyle	Lenny McAllister
Party	Democratic	Republican
Popular vote	255,293	87,999
Percentage	74.4%	25.6%
- County results Doyle: 60–70% 70–80%
U.S. Representative before election
Mike Doyle
Democratic
Elected U.S. Representative
Mike Doyle
Democratic

The 14th district included the entire city of Pittsburgh and parts of surrounding suburbs. The incumbent was Democrat Michael F. Doyle, who had represented the district since 2003, and previously represented the 18th district from 1995 to 2003. He was re-elected with 84% of the vote in the primary and unopposed in the general in 2014; the district had a PVI of D+15.

=== Democratic primary ===
Doyle was challenged for the Democratic nomination by Janis Brooks, who ran against him in 2012 and 2014.

==== Candidates ====
===== Nominee =====
- Michael F. Doyle, incumbent U.S. representative

===== Eliminated in primary =====
- Janis C. Brooks, pastor, CEO/founder of Citizens to Abolish Domestic Apartheid and candidate for this seat in 2012 and 2014

==== Endorsements ====
Michael F. Doyle (D)

Labor unions

- AFL-CIO

==== Primary results ====
Democratic primary results
Party	Candidate	Votes	%
Democratic	Michael F. Doyle (incumbent)	103,710	76.6
Democratic	Janis Brooks	31,659	23.4
Total votes		135,369	100.0

=== Republican primary ===
==== Candidates ====
===== Nominee =====
- Lenny McAllister, political commentator and candidate for Illinois's 2nd congressional district in 2013

=== General election ===
==== Endorsements ====
Michael F. Doyle (D)

Labor unions

- AFL-CIO

==== Predictions ====
Source	Ranking	As of
The Cook Political Report	Safe D	November 7, 2016
Daily Kos Elections	Safe D	November 7, 2016
Rothenberg	Safe D	November 3, 2016
Sabato's Crystal Ball	Safe D	November 7, 2016
RCP	Safe D	October 31, 2016

==== Results ====
Pennsylvania's 14th congressional district, 2016
Party	Candidate	Votes	%
Democratic	Michael F. Doyle (incumbent)	255,293	74.4
Republican	Lenny McAllister	87,999	25.6
Total votes		343,292	100.0
Democratic hold			

== District 15 ==
2018 Pennsylvania's 15th congressional district election
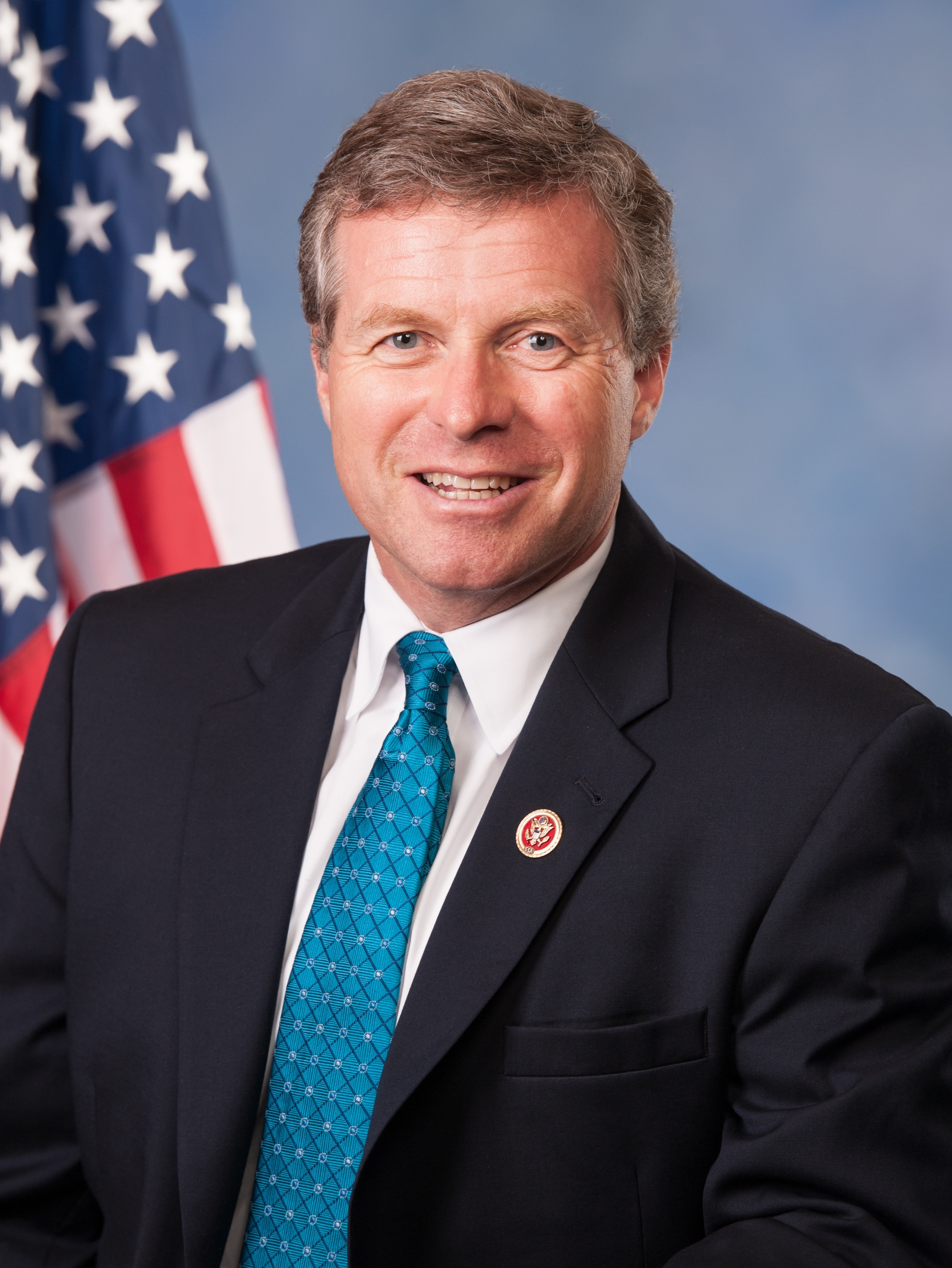

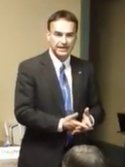
Nominee	Charlie Dent	Rick Daugherty
Party	Republican	Democratic
Popular vote	190,618	124,129
Percentage	58.4%	38.0%
- County results Dent: 50–60% 60–70% 70–80%
U.S. Representative before election
Charlie Dent
Republican
Elected U.S. Representative
Charlie Dent
Republican

The 15th district was in Eastern Pennsylvania and included Lehigh County and parts of Berks, Dauphin, Lebanon and Northampton counties. The incumbent was Republican Charlie Dent, who had represented the district since 2005. He was re-elected unopposed in 2014, and the district had a PVI of R+2.

=== Republican primary ===
==== Candidates ====
===== Nominee =====
- Charlie Dent, incumbent U.S. representative

==== Primary results ====
Republican primary results
Party	Candidate	Votes	%
Republican	Charlie Dent (incumbent)	75,821	100.0
Total votes		75,821	100.0

=== Democratic primary ===
==== Candidates ====
===== Nominee =====
- Rick Daugherty, former chair of the Lehigh County Democratic Party and nominee for this seat in 2012

===== Withdrawn =====
- David A. Clark
- Laura Quick

===== Declined =====
- Archie Follweiler, former Kutztown Borough councilman and state house candidate in 2006

==== Primary results ====
Democratic primary results
Party	Candidate	Votes	%
Democratic	Rick Daugherty	59,475	100.0
Total votes		59,475	100.0

=== General election ===
==== Endorsements ====
Rick Daugherty (D)

Labor unions

- AFL-CIO

==== Predictions ====
Source	Ranking	As of
The Cook Political Report	Safe R	November 7, 2016
Daily Kos Elections	Safe R	November 7, 2016
Rothenberg	Safe R	November 3, 2016
Sabato's Crystal Ball	Safe R	November 7, 2016
RCP	Safe R	October 31, 2016

==== Results ====
Pennsylvania's 15th congressional district, 2016
Party	Candidate	Votes	%
Republican	Charlie Dent (incumbent)	190,618	58.4
Democratic	Rick Daugherty	124,129	38.0
Libertarian	Paul Rizzo	11,727	3.6
Total votes		326,474	100.0
Republican hold			

== District 16 ==
2016 Pennsylvania's 16th congressional district election
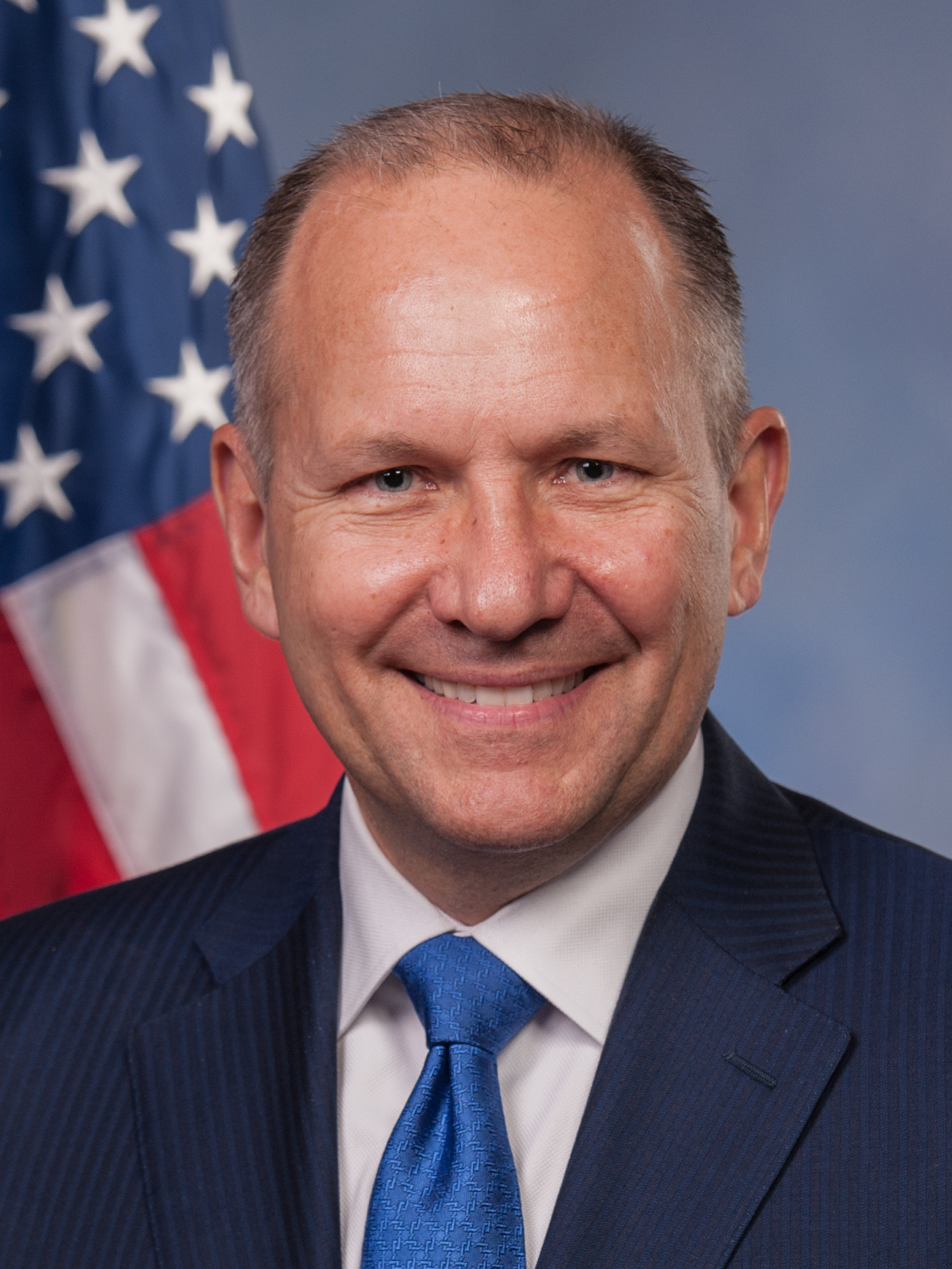

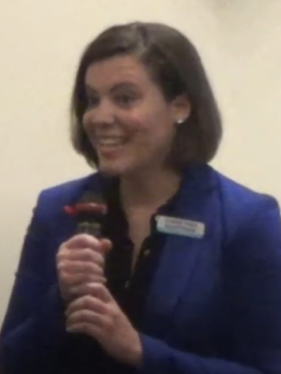
Nominee	Lloyd Smucker	Christina Hartman
Party	Republican	Democratic
Popular vote	168,669	134,586
Percentage	53.8%	42.9%
- County results Smucker: 50–60% Hartman: 50–60% 60–70%
U.S. Representative before election
Joe Pitts
Republican
Elected U.S. Representative
Lloyd Smucker
Republican

The 16th district was in Southeastern Pennsylvania, just west of Philadelphia and included a large portion of southern Chester County, most of Lancaster County and a sliver of Berks County, including the city of Reading. The incumbent was Republican Joe Pitts, who had represented the district since 1997. He was re-elected with 58% of the vote in 2014, and the district had a PVI of R+4. Pitts did not run for re-election.

=== Republican primary ===
==== Candidates ====
===== Nominee =====
- Lloyd Smucker, state senator

===== Eliminated in primary =====
- Jeffrey Bartos
- Chet Beiler, former chair of the Lancaster County Republican Committee, candidate for lieutenant governor in 2010 and nominee for auditor general in 2008
- Craig Davis
- Thomas Wentzel
- Brad Witmer

===== Declined =====
- Joe Pitts, incumbent U.S. representative

==== Primary results ====
Republican primary results
Party	Candidate	Votes	%
Republican	Lloyd Smucker	49,716	54.1
Republican	Chet Beiler	42,246	45.9
Total votes		91,641	100.0

=== Democratic primary ===
==== Candidates ====
===== Nominee =====
- Christina Hartman, former nonprofit executive

===== Withdrawn =====
- Raj Kittappa, stem cell researcher and candidate for this seat in 2014
- Gary Wegman, dentist

===== Endorsements =====
Christina Hartman

Statewide officials

- Eugene DePasquale, Pennsylvania Auditor General

State legislators

- Tom Houghton, former state representative and nominee for this seat in 2014
- Marc Rizzo, state representative
- Judy Schwank, state senator
- Mike Sturla, state representative

Organizations

- Chester County Democratic Committee

Local officials

- John Graupera, Lancaster City Council President
- Lois Herr, Mount Gretna Borough Councilwoman and nominee for this seat in 2004, 2006 and 2010
- James Reichenbach, Lancaster City Councilman
- Pete Soto, Lancaster City Councilman
- Kathy Wasong, Lancaster Township Supervisor
- Barbara Wilson, Lancaster City Councilwoman

Individuals

- Aryanna Berringer, business owner and nominee for this seat in 2012
- Norman Bristol Colon, chair, Latino Democratic Caucus of Lancaster County
Declined to endorse

Organizations

- Lancaster County Democratic Committee

==== Primary results ====
Democratic primary results
Party	Candidate	Votes	%
Democratic	Christina Hartman	51,588	100.0
Total votes		51,588	100.0

=== General election ===
==== Endorsements ====
Christina Hartman (D)

Statewide officials

- Eugene DePasquale, Pennsylvania Auditor General

State legislators

- Tom Houghton, former state representative and nominee for this seat in 2014
- Marc Rizzo, state representative
- Judy Schwank, state senator
- Mike Sturla, state representative

Labor unions

- AFL-CIO

Organizations

- Democratic Congressional Campaign Committee "Red to Blue" Program

==== Predictions ====
Source	Ranking	As of
The Cook Political Report	Lean R	November 7, 2016
Daily Kos Elections	Likely R	November 7, 2016
Rothenberg	Safe R	November 3, 2016
Sabato's Crystal Ball	Lean R	November 7, 2016
RCP	Likely R	October 31, 2016

==== Results ====
Pennsylvania's 16th congressional district, 2016
Party	Candidate	Votes	%
Republican	Lloyd Smucker	168,669	53.8
Democratic	Christina Hartman	134,586	42.9
Libertarian	Shawn Patrick House	10,518	3.3
Total votes		313,773	100.0
Republican hold			

== District 17 ==
2016 Pennsylvania's 17th congressional district election
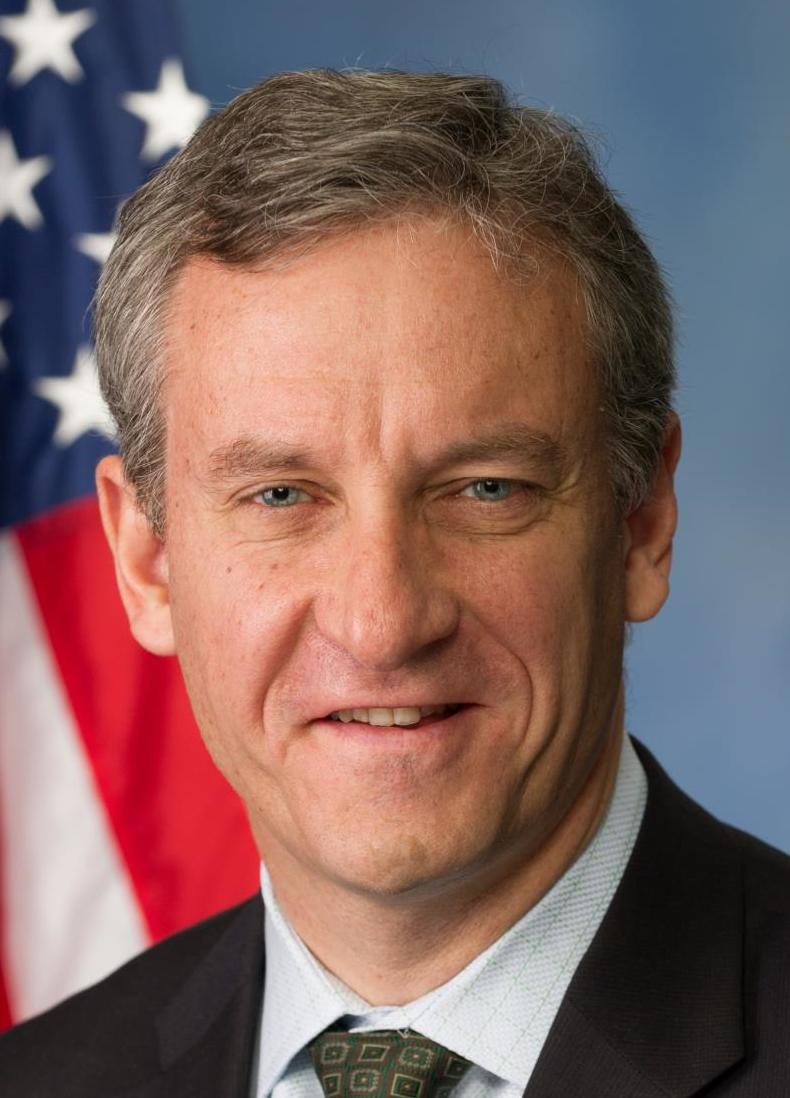

Nominee	Matt Cartwright	Matt Connolly
Party	Democratic	Republican
Popular vote	157,734	135,430
Percentage	53.8%	46.2%
- County results Cartwright: 50–60% 60–70% 70–80% Connolly: 50–60% 60–70%
U.S. Representative before election
Matt Cartwright
Democratic
Elected U.S. Representative
Matt Cartwright
Democratic

The 17th district was in Eastern Pennsylvania and included Schuylkill, Carbon, Monroe, Luzerne and Lackawanna counties. The incumbent was Democrat Matt Cartwright, who had represented the district since 2013. He was re-elected with 57% of the vote in 2014, and the district had a PVI of D+4.

=== Democratic primary ===
==== Candidates ====
===== Nominee =====
- Matt Cartwright, incumbent U.S. representative

==== Primary results ====
Democratic primary results
Party	Candidate	Votes	%
Democratic	Matt Cartwright (incumbent)	73,648	100.0
Total votes		73,648	100.0

=== Republican primary ===
==== Candidates ====
===== Nominee =====
- Matt Connolly, sports car racing team owner and candidate for this seat in 2014

===== Eliminated in primary =====
- Glenn Geissinger, Northampton County Councilman

==== Primary results ====
Republican primary results
Party	Candidate	Votes	%
Republican	Matt Connolly	34,263	62.7
Republican	Glenn Geissinger	20,399	37.3
Total votes		54,662	100.0

=== General election ===
==== Endorsements ====
Matt Cartwright (D)

Labor unions

- AFL-CIO

==== Predictions ====
Source	Ranking	As of
The Cook Political Report	Safe D	November 7, 2016
Daily Kos Elections	Safe D	November 7, 2016
Rothenberg	Safe D	November 3, 2016
Sabato's Crystal Ball	Safe D	November 7, 2016
RCP	Likely D	October 31, 2016

==== Results ====
Pennsylvania's 17th congressional district, 2016
Party	Candidate	Votes	%
Democratic	Matt Cartwright (incumbent)	157,734	53.8
Republican	Matt Connolly	135,430	46.2
Total votes		293,164	100.0
Democratic hold			

== District 18 ==
2016 Pennsylvania's 18th congressional district election
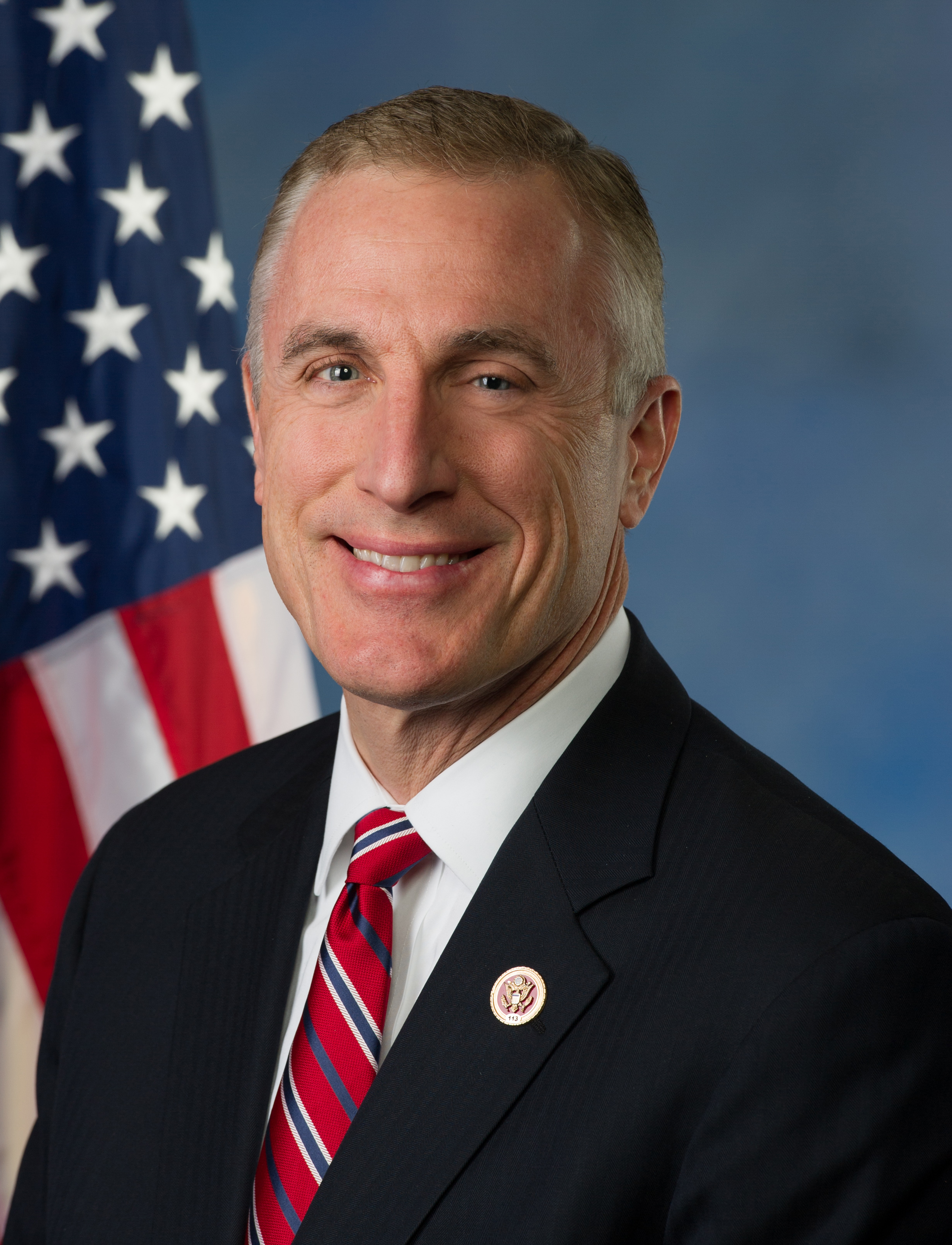
Nominee	Tim Murphy
Party	Republican
Popular vote	293,684
Percentage	100.0%
U.S. Representative before election
Tim Murphy
Republican
Elected U.S. Representative
Tim Murphy
Republican

The 18th district was in the southern suburbs of Pittsburgh and included parts of Allegheny, Washington, Greene and Westmoreland counties. The incumbent was Republican Tim Murphy, who had represented the district since 2003. He was re-elected unopposed in 2014, and the district had a PVI of R+10.

=== Republican primary ===
==== Candidates ====
===== Nominee =====
- Tim Murphy, incumbent U.S. representative

==== Primary results ====
Republican primary results
Party	Candidate	Votes	%
Republican	Tim Murphy (incumbent)	88,266	100.0
Total votes		88,266	100.0

=== General election ===
==== Endorsements ====
Tim Murphy (R)

Labor unions

- AFL-CIO

==== Predictions ====
Source	Ranking	As of
The Cook Political Report	Safe R	November 7, 2016
Daily Kos Elections	Safe R	November 7, 2016
Rothenberg	Safe R	November 3, 2016
Sabato's Crystal Ball	Safe R	November 7, 2016
RCP	Safe R	October 31, 2016

==== Results ====
Pennsylvania's 18th congressional district, 2016
Party	Candidate	Votes	%
Republican	Tim Murphy (incumbent)	293,684	100.0
Total votes		293,684	100.0
Republican hold			
