= 2015 Allegheny County Executive election =

- November 3, 2015
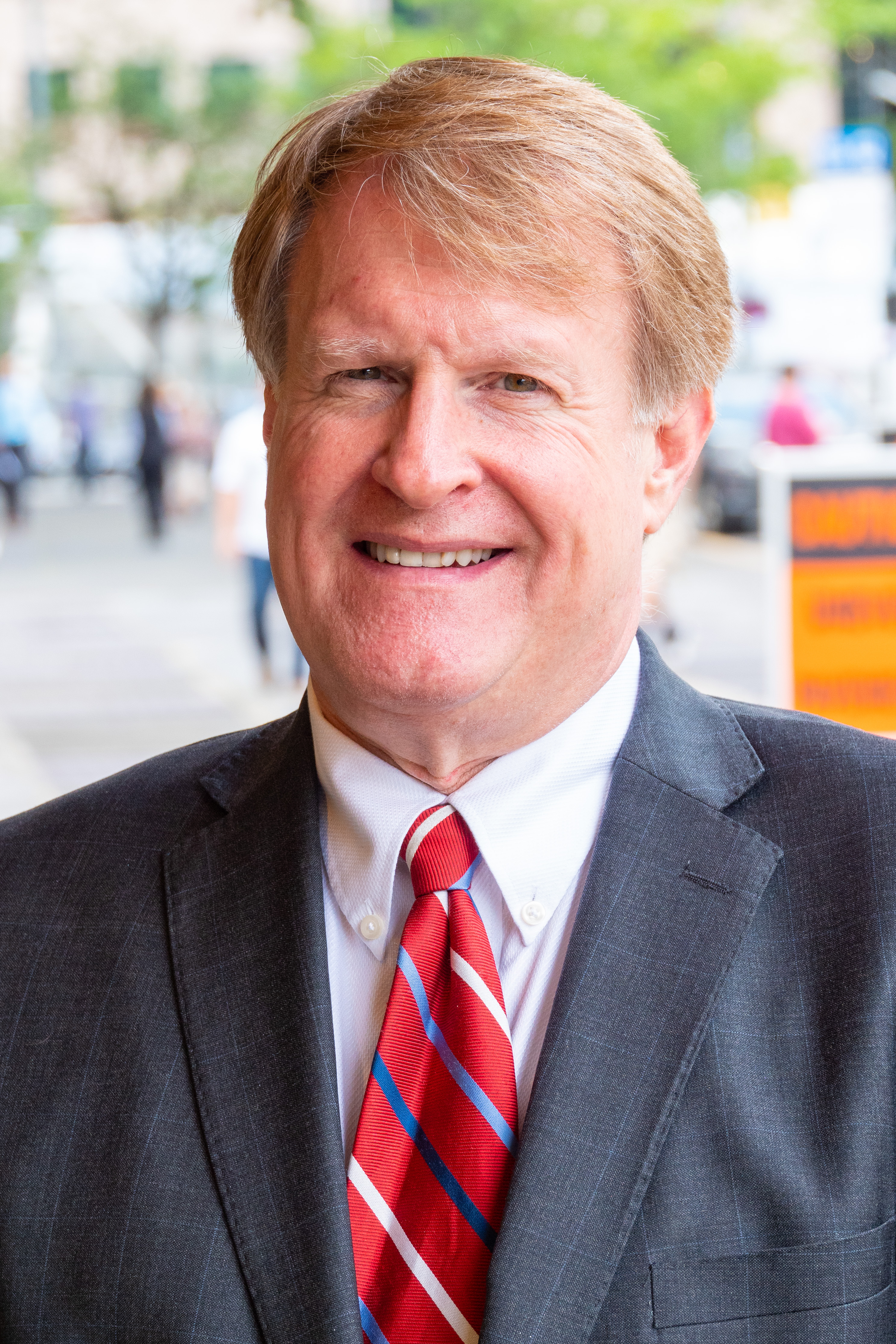

| Nominee | Rich Fitzgerald | Todd Elliott Koger |
| Party | Democratic | Independent |
| Popular vote | 143,334 | 46,298 |
| Percentage | 74.95% | 24.21% |
Allegheny County Executive before election
Rich Fitzgerald
Democratic
Elected Allegheny County Executive
Rich Fitzgerald
Democratic

The 2015 Allegheny County Executive election took place on November 3, 2015. Incumbent Democratic County Executive Rich Fitzgerald, first elected in 2011, ran for re-election to a second term. He faced no opposition in the Democratic primary and won the nomination unopposed. In the general election, his only opponent was independent Todd Elliott Koger, a perennial candidate who was also simultaneously running for several other positions in the county. Fitzgerald defeated Koger in a landslide, winning 75 percent of the vote.

== Democratic primary ==
=== Candidates ===
- Rich Fitzgerald, incumbent County Executive

=== Results ===
Democratic primary results
| Party | Candidate | Votes | % |
|---|---|---|---|
| Democratic | Rich Fitzgerald (inc.) | 69,157 | 97.44% |
| Democratic | Write-ins | 1,814 | 2.56% |
| Total votes | | 70,971 | 100.00% |

== Republican primary ==
No candidates filed for the Republican nomination.

=== Results ===
Republican primary results
| Party | Candidate | Votes | % |
|---|---|---|---|
| Republican | Write-ins | 1,195 | 100.00% |
| Total votes | | 1,195 | 100.00% |

== General election ==
=== Candidates ===
- Rich Fitzgerald, incumbent County Executive (Democratic)
- Todd Elliott Koger, perennial candidate (Independent)

=== Campaign ===
In the general election, Fitzgerald's only opponent, Todd Elliott Koger, was running in two other races simultaneously: an at-large County Council seat and the District 10 County Council seat. The Pittsburgh Post-Gazette endorsed Fitzgerald over Koger, criticizing Koger's perennial office-seeking. "It's hard to believe a candidate is serious when he keeps running for so many different offices, particularly after having been rejected convincingly by the voters so many times before," the editorial board wrote. Fitzgerald ultimately defeated Koger in a landslide, winning 75 percent of the vote to Koger's 24 percent.

=== Results ===
2015 Allegheny County Executive election
| Party | Candidate | Votes | % |
|---|---|---|---|
| Democratic | Rich Fitzgerald (inc.) | 143,334 | 74.95% |
| Independent | Todd Elliott Koger | 46,298 | 24.21% |
| Write-in | | 1,609 | 0.84% |
| Total votes | | 191,241 | 100.00% |
| Democratic hold | | | |
