= 2010 Pennsylvania gubernatorial election =

- November 2, 2010
- Turnout: 41.7%
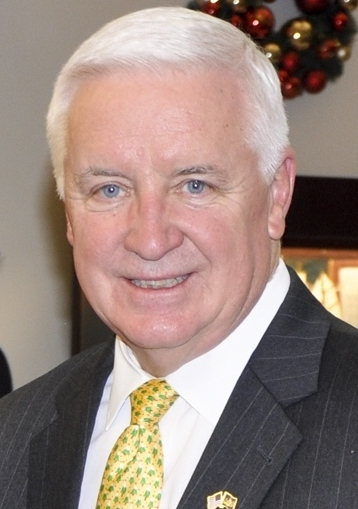

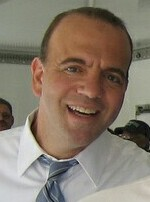
Nominee	Tom Corbett	Dan Onorato
Party	Republican	Democratic
Running mate	Jim Cawley	Scott Conklin
Popular vote	2,172,763	1,814,788
Percentage	54.49%	45.51%
- Corbett: 50–60% 60–70% 70–80% 80–90% >90% Onorato: 50–60% 60–70% 70–80% 80–90% >90% Tie: 50% No data
Governor before election
Ed Rendell
Democratic
Elected Governor
Tom Corbett
Republican

The 2010 Pennsylvania gubernatorial election was held on November 2, 2010, to elect the governor and lieutenant governor of Pennsylvania, concurrently with elections to the United States Senate in Pennsylvania and other states, elections to the United States House of Representatives, and various state and local elections.

Incumbent Democratic Governor Ed Rendell was term-limited and thus ineligible to seek re-election in 2010. In the primary, Democrats nominated Allegheny County Chief Executive Dan Onorato, who defeated Pennsylvania Auditor General Jack Wagner, State Senator Anthony H. Williams, and Montgomery County Commissioner Joe Hoeffel. Republicans nominated Pennsylvania Attorney General Tom Corbett, who defeated State Representative Sam Rohrer in the primary. In primary elections for lieutenant governor, which were held separately, Scott Conklin defeated Jonathan Saidel and Doris Smith-Ribner in the Democratic primary. Jim Cawley emerged from a nine-candidate field in the Republican primary.

Corbett defeated Onorato in the November general election. Rendell's low approval ratings was described as analysts as a catalyst for Onorato's loss. As lieutenant gubernatorial nominees run on a joint ticket with the gubernatorial nominee of their respective parties in the general election in Pennsylvania, Cawley was elected lieutenant governor over Conklin. As of 2026, this is the last time a Republican was elected governor of Pennsylvania, and the only time since 1998. This is also the last time Republicans won the following counties in a gubernatorial election: Allegheny, Erie, Beaver, Centre, Dauphin, Luzerne, Monroe, Northampton, Lehigh, Berks, Bucks, and Chester. This is the last Pennsylvania gubernatorial election in which the winner won a majority of counties.

== Democratic primary ==
=== Candidates ===
- Joe Hoeffel, Montgomery County commissioner and former U.S. representative (from Abington Township, Montgomery County)
- Dan Onorato, Allegheny County chief executive (from Pittsburgh)
- Jack Wagner, auditor general (from Pittsburgh)
- Anthony Williams, state senator (from Philadelphia)

=== Dropped Out ===
- Chris Doherty, mayor of Scranton
- Tom Knox, healthcare executive (from Philadelphia)

=== Polling ===
Poll source	Dates administered	Dan Onorato	Jack Wagner	Joe Hoeffel	Anthony Williams	Chris Doherty	Tom Knox	Undecided
Muhlenberg/Morning Call	May 7, 2010	35%	8%	11%	10%	—	—	36%
Rasmussen Reports	May 6, 2010	34%	17%	9%	17%	—	—	17%
Quinnipiac	April 28 – May 5, 2010	36%	8%	9%	8%	—	—	37%
Muhlenberg/Morning Call	May 2, 2010	41%	5%	6%	8%	—	—	40%
Quinnipiac	March 31 – April 5, 2010	20%	13%	15%	5%	—	—	47%
Research 2000	March 8–10, 2010	19%	10%	12%	3%	—	—	56%
Franklin and Marshall	February 23, 2010	6%	6%	6%	1%	4%	—	72%
Rasmussen Reports	October 13, 2009	19%	14%	11%	—	6%	4%	37%
Quinnipiac	September 30, 2009	14%	7%	12%	—	5%	4%	46%

=== Results ===
Results by county: Onorato—70–80% Onorato—60–70% Onorato—50–60% Onorato—40–50% Onorato—30–40% Wagner—30–40% Wagner—40–50% Wagner—50–60% Hoeffel—50–60% Williams—50–60%

Democratic primary results
Party	Candidate	Votes	%
Democratic	Dan Onorato	463,575	45.1
Democratic	Jack Wagner	248,338	24.1
Democratic	Anthony Williams	185,784	18.1
Democratic	Joe Hoeffel	130,799	12.7
Total votes		1,028,496	100.0

== Republican primary ==
=== Candidates ===
- Tom Corbett, attorney general (from Shaler Township)
- Sam Rohrer, state representative (from Robeson Township)

=== Dropped out ===
- Jim Gerlach, U.S. representative
- Pat Meehan, former United States attorney for the Eastern District of Pennsylvania (ran in and won race for U.S. representative from Pennsylvania's 7th congressional district)

=== Polling ===
Poll source	Dates administered	Jim Gerlach	Tom Corbett	Sam Rohrer	Undecided
Quinnipiac	March 31 – April 5, 2010	—	58%	7%	35%
Franklin and Marshall	February 23, 2010	—	26%	4%	65%
Rasmussen Reports	October 13, 2009	10%	54%	—	30%
Quinnipiac	September 30, 2009	13%	42%	—	43%

=== Results ===
Results by county: Corbett—80–90% Corbett—70–80% Corbett—60–70% Corbett—50–60% Rohrer—50–60% Rohrer—70–80%

Republican primary results
Party	Candidate	Votes	%
Republican	Tom Corbett	589,249	68.7
Republican	Sam Rohrer	267,893	31.3
Total votes		857,142	100.0

== General election ==
=== Candidates ===
- Tom Corbett (R), Pennsylvania attorney general
- Dan Onorato (D), Allegheny County executive

=== Predictions ===
Source	Ranking	As of
The Cook Political Report	Lean R (flip)	October 14, 2010
Rothenberg Political Report	Lean R (flip)	October 28, 2010
RealClearPolitics	Lean R (flip)	November 1, 2010
Sabato's Crystal Ball	Likely R (flip)	October 28, 2010
CQ Politics	Lean R (flip)	October 28, 2010

=== Polling ===
Poll source	Dates administered	Tom Corbett (R)	Dan Onorato (D)
Quinnipiac	October 25–30, 2010	52%	42%
Rasmussen Reports	October 28, 2010	52%	43%
Muhlenberg/Morning Call	October 28, 2010	52%	37%
Rasmussen Reports	October 21, 2010	50%	45%
Public Policy Polling	October 17–18, 2010	48%	46%
Quinnipiac	October 13–17, 2010	49%	44%
Rasmussen Reports	October 15, 2010	54%	40%
Rasmussen Reports	October 2, 2010	53%	41%
Franklin & Marshall College in Lancaster	September 29, 2010	36%	32%
Suffolk University	September 24–27, 2010	47%	40%
Muhlenberg/Morning Call	September 18–23, 2010	46%	37%
CNN/Time	September 17–21, 2010	52%	44%
Quinnipiac	September 15–19, 2010	54%	39%
Rasmussen Reports	September 13, 2010	49%	39%
Rasmussen Reports	August 30, 2010	50%	37%
Rasmussen Reports	August 16, 2010	48%	38%
Public Policy Polling	August 14–16, 2010	48%	35%
Rasmussen Reports	July 28, 2010	50%	39%
Rasmussen Reports	July 14, 2010	48%	38%
Quinnipiac	July 6–11, 2010	44%	37%
Rasmussen Reports	June 29, 2010	49%	39%
Public Policy Polling	June 19–21, 2010	45%	35%
Rasmussen Reports	June 2, 2010	49%	33%
Rasmussen Reports	May 19, 2010	49%	36%
Quinnipiac	May 4–10, 2010	43%	37%
Rasmussen Reports	April 15, 2010	45%	36%
Quinnipiac	March 30 – April 5, 2010	45%	33%
Public Policy Polling	March 29 – April 1, 2010	45%	32%
Rasmussen Reports	March 16, 2010	46%	29%
Research 2000	March 8–10, 2010	40%	34%
Rasmussen Reports	February 10, 2010	52%	26%
Rasmussen Reports	December 10, 2009	44%	28%
Quinnipiac	September 30, 2009	47%	28%

=== Results ===
Pennsylvania gubernatorial election, 2010
Party	Candidate	Votes	%
Republican	Tom Corbett	2,172,763	54.49%
Democratic	Dan Onorato	1,814,788	45.51%
Total votes		3,987,551	100.00%
Republican gain from Democratic			

==== By county ====
County	Tom Corbett Republican		Dan Onorato Democratic		Margin		Total votes cast
County	#	%	#	%	#	%	Total votes cast
Adams	22,696	72.81%	8,474	27.19%	14,222	45.62%	31,170
Allegheny	213,889	50.05%	213,429	49.95%	460	0.10%	427,318
Armstrong	16,096	70.94%	6,595	29.06%	9,501	41.88%	22,691
Beaver	32,670	56.49%	25,163	43.51%	7,507	12.98%	57,833
Bedford	12,873	77.96%	3,639	22.04%	9,234	55.92%	16,512
Berks	66,758	59.34%	45,746	40.66%	21,012	18.68%	112,504
Blair	26,199	72.88%	9,750	27.12%	16,449	45.76%	35,949
Bradford	12,474	72.46%	4,741	27.54%	7,733	44.92%	17,215
Bucks	126,190	55.27%	102,144	44.73%	24,046	10.54%	228,334
Butler	47,151	71.93%	18,404	28.07%	28,747	43.86%	65,555
Cambria	27,444	57.72%	20,102	42.28%	7,342	15.44%	47,546
Cameron	1,100	70.47%	461	29.53%	639	40.94%	1,561
Carbon	11,297	59.05%	7,834	40.95%	3,463	18.10%	19,131
Centre	24,458	54.51%	20,407	45.49%	4,051	9.02%	44,865
Chester	97,112	55.96%	76,440	44.04%	20,672	11.92%	173,552
Clarion	8,827	71.23%	3,566	28.77%	5,261	42.46%	12,393
Clearfield	15,685	63.52%	9,007	36.48%	6,678	27.04%	24,692
Clinton	5,676	61.03%	3,625	38.97%	2,051	22.06%	9,301
Columbia	12,151	66.45%	6,136	33.55%	6,015	32.90%	18,287
Crawford	17,883	66.79%	8,891	33.21%	8,992	33.58%	26,774
Cumberland	56,284	69.65%	24,531	30.35%	31,753	39.30%	80,815
Dauphin	53,261	60.47%	34,813	39.53%	18,448	20.94%	88,074
Delaware	95,448	47.22%	106,704	52.78%	-11,256	-5.56%	202,152
Elk	6,374	61.83%	3,935	38.17%	2,439	23.66%	10,309
Erie	42,752	50.10%	42,581	49.90%	171	0.20%	85,333
Fayette	18,994	55.70%	15,106	44.30%	3,888	11.40%	34,100
Forest	1,257	66.51%	633	33.49%	624	33.02%	1,890
Franklin	33,559	76.52%	10,295	23.48%	23,264	53.04%	43,854
Fulton	3,521	78.84%	945	21.16%	2,576	57.68%	4,466
Greene	6,000	53.80%	5,153	46.20%	847	7.60%	11,153
Huntingdon	9,764	72.90%	3,629	27.10%	6,135	45.80%	13,393
Indiana	16,520	65.14%	8,842	34.86%	7,678	30.28%	25,362
Jefferson	10,017	74.55%	3,420	25.45%	6,597	49.10%	13,437
Juniata	5,834	79.18%	1,534	20.82%	4,300	58.36%	7,368
Lackawanna	31,342	45.00%	38,300	55.00%	-6,958	-10.00%	69,642
Lancaster	106,430	71.10%	43,268	28.90%	63,162	42.20%	149,698
Lawrence	16,489	58.91%	11,499	41.09%	4,990	17.82%	27,988
Lebanon	29,534	74.07%	10,340	25.93%	19,194	48.14%	39,874
Lehigh	52,769	54.95%	43,261	45.05%	9,508	9.90%	96,030
Luzerne	49,734	53.41%	43,392	46.59%	6,342	6.82%	93,126
Lycoming	25,154	73.05%	9,278	26.95%	15,876	46.10%	34,432
McKean	7,117	72.03%	2,763	27.97%	4,354	44.06%	9,880
Mercer	21,146	58.43%	15,047	41.57%	6,099	16.86%	36,193
Mifflin	9,642	78.85%	2,587	21.15%	7,055	57.70%	12,229
Monroe	21,162	53.92%	18,082	46.08%	3,080	7.84%	39,244
Montgomery	139,244	48.29%	149,080	51.71%	-9,836	-3.42%	288,324
Montour	3,896	68.22%	1,815	31.78%	2,081	36.44%	5,711
Northampton	45,986	54.19%	38,871	45.81%	7,115	8.38%	84,857
Northumberland	17,781	67.93%	8,393	32.07%	9,388	35.86%	26,174
Perry	11,568	79.30%	3,019	20.70%	8,549	58.60%	14,587
Philadelphia	72,352	17.11%	350,431	82.89%	-278,079	-65.78%	428,841
Pike	9,894	64.39%	5,472	35.61%	4,422	28.78%	15,366
Potter	4,053	76.33%	1,257	23.67%	2,796	52.66%	5,310
Schuylkill	28,659	63.41%	16,535	36.59%	12,124	26.82%	45,194
Snyder	8,591	76.01%	2,712	23.99%	5,879	52.02%	11,303
Somerset	18,542	71.77%	7,294	28.23%	11,248	43.54%	25,836
Sullivan	1,654	70.80%	682	29.20%	972	41.60%	2,336
Susquehanna	9,612	68.63%	4,394	31.37%	5,218	37.26%	14,006
Tioga	9,069	75.56%	2,933	24.44%	6,136	51.12%	12,002
Union	8,121	68.89%	3,668	31.11%	4,453	37.78%	11,789
Venango	10,937	68.82%	4,955	31.18%	5,982	37.64%	15,892
Warren	8,194	67.22%	3,996	32.78%	4,198	34.44%	12,190
Washington	41,984	59.81%	28,211	40.19%	13,773	19.62%	70,195
Wayne	10,747	67.87%	5,087	32.13%	5,660	35.74%	15,834
Westmoreland	84,762	67.70%	40,440	32.30%	44,322	35.40%	125,202
Wyoming	5,901	66.17%	3,017	33.83%	2,884	32.34%	8,918
York	92,483	70.86%	38,034	29.14%	54,449	41.72%	130,517
Totals	2,172,763	54.49%	1,814,788	45.51%	357,975	8.98%	3,987,551

==== Counties that flipped from Democratic to Republican ====
- Allegheny (largest city: Pittsburgh)
- Beaver (largest city: Beaver)
- Berks (largest borough: Reading)
- Bucks (largest municipality: Bensalem)
- Cambria (largest municipality: Johnstown)
- Carbon (largest municipality: Lehighton)
- Centre (largest municipality: State College)
- Chester (largest municipality: West Chester)
- Clearfield (largest city: DuBois)
- Clinton (largest city: Lock Haven)
- Columbia (largest city: Bloomsburg)
- Elk (largest city: St. Marys)
- Erie (largest municipality: Erie)
- Fayette (largest borough: Uniontown)
- Greene (largest municipality: Waynesburg)
- Lawrence (largest municipality: New Castle)
- Lehigh (largest municipality: Allentown)
- Luzerne (largest municipality: Wilkes-Barre)
- Mercer (largest municipality: Hermitage)
- Monroe (largest borough: Stroudsburg)
- Northampton (largest municipality: Bethlehem)
- Northumberland (largest borough: Sunbury)
- Pike (largest municipality: Matamoras)
- Schuylkill (largest city: Pottsville)
- Susquehanna (largest municipality: Forest City)
- Warren (largest city: Warren)
- Washington (largest municipality: Peters Township)
- Wayne (largest municipality: Honesdale)
- Wyoming (largest municipality: Tunkhannock)

== See also ==
- 2010 Pennsylvania lieutenant gubernatorial election
- 2010 United States Senate election in Pennsylvania
- 2010 United States gubernatorial elections
