= 2011 Allegheny County Executive election =

- November 8, 2011
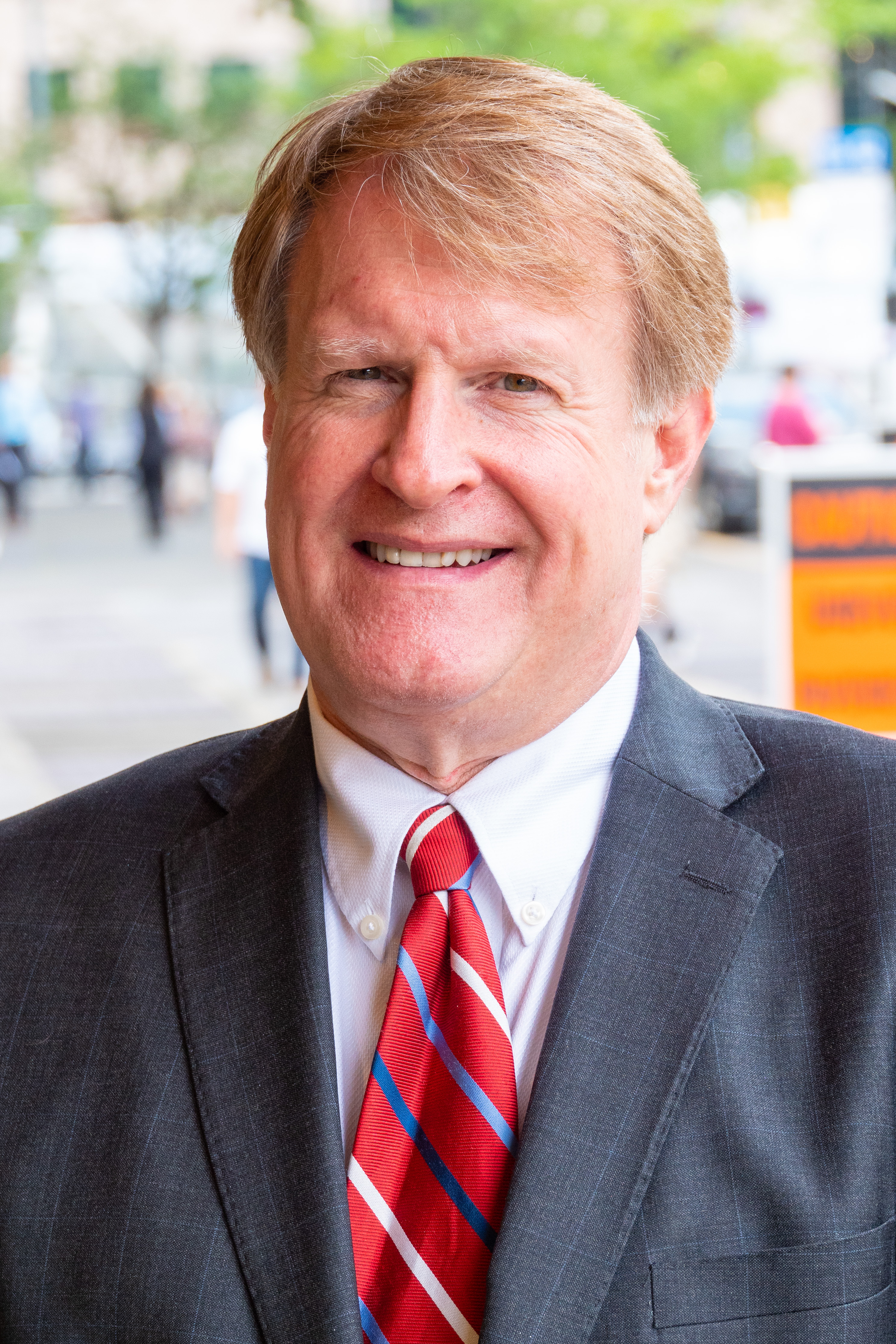

Nominee	Rich Fitzgerald	D. Raja
Party	Democratic	Republican
Popular vote	142,109	86,595
Percentage	61.67%	37.58%
Allegheny County Executive before election
Dan Onorato
Democratic
Elected Allegheny County Executive
Rich Fitzgerald
Democratic

The 2011 Allegheny County Executive election was held on November 8, 2011. Incumbent County Executive Dan Onorato, who was the unsuccessful Democratic nominee for Governor in 2010, announced on January 13, 2011, just months after the election, that he would not seek a third term. Rich Fitzgerald, the President of the County Council, won the Democratic primary over County Controller Mark Patrick Flaherty, and then faced Mt. Lebanon Township Commissioner D. Raja, the Republican nominee, in the general election. Fitzgerald defeated Raja in a landslide, winning 62 percent of the vote.

== Democratic primary ==
=== Candidates ===
- Rich Fitzgerald, County Council President
- Michael Patrick Flaherty, County Controller

=== Primary results ===
Democratic primary results
Party	Candidate	Votes	%
Democratic	Rich Fitzgerald	66,387	55.24%
Democratic	Michael Patrick Flaherty	52,802	43.94%
Democratic	Write-ins	990	0.82%
Total votes		120,179	100.00%

== Republican primary ==
=== Candidates ===
- D. Raja, Mt. Lebanon Township Commissioner
- Chuck McCullough, County Commissioner

=== Primary results ===
Republican primary results
Party	Candidate	Votes	%
Republican	D. Raja	32,540	71.10%
Republican	Chuck McCullough	12,855	28.09%
Republican	Write-ins	372	0.81%
Total votes		45,767	100.00%

== General election ==
=== Results ===
2011 Allegheny County Executive election
Party	Candidate	Votes	%
Democratic	Rich Fitzgerald	142,109	61.67%
Republican	D. Raja	86,595	37.58%
Write-in		1,730	0.75%
Total votes		230,434	100.00%
Democratic hold			
