= Lindy Li =

American political commentator (born 1990)

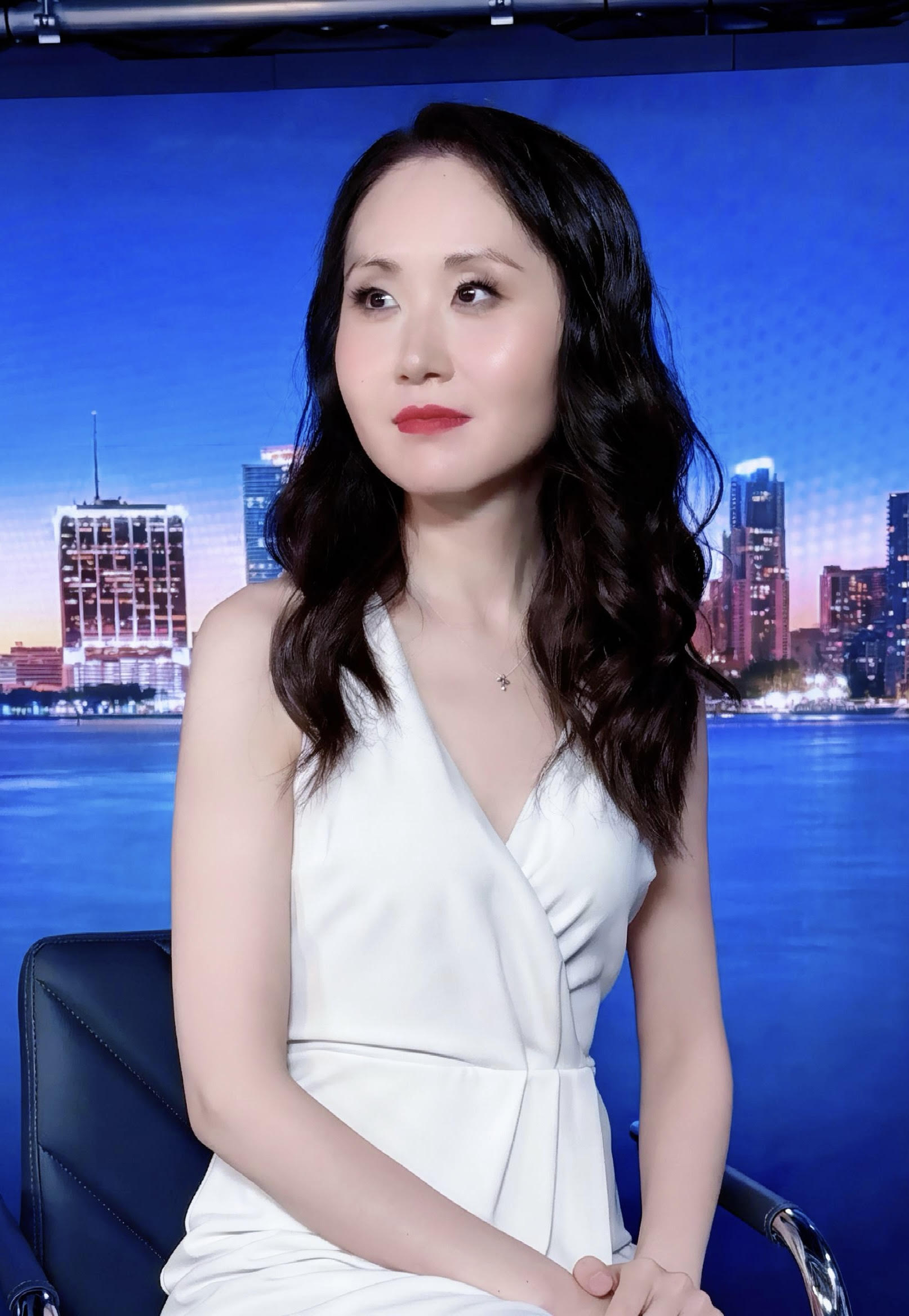
- Li in 2026
- Born: December 14, 1990 (age 35); Chengdu, Sichuan, China
- Education: Princeton University (BA)
- Political party: Democratic (until December 2024); Independent (December 2024 – January 2025); Republican (January 2025–present)

Lindy Li (born December 14, 1990) is an American political commentator.

Li was previously a campaign fundraiser and bundler for the Democratic National Committee (DNC), fundraising for both the Joe Biden 2020 and Kamala Harris 2024 presidential campaigns. Formerly a defender of the Biden administration, Li became a critic of the Democratic Party following the 2024 U.S. presidential election and switched her political party affiliation from the Democratic to the Republican Party.

As of May 2025, Li joined the female-led YouTube talk show, Her Take, produced by Valuetainment.

== Early life and education ==
Lindy Li was born in Chengdu, Sichuan, China, on December 14, 1990. She immigrated with her family to the United States when she was five years old and moved to Pennsylvania at age 10. Her father worked as a property manager. Her grandparents were illiterate farmers.

Li spent much of her childhood in Malvern, Pennsylvania, where she attended public school before transferring to the Agnes Irwin School, a private college-preparatory day school for girls, on a scholarship, graduating in 2008.

Li attended Princeton University where she was first elected vice president of her freshman class before assuming the title of class president in February 2009, following the elected student class president's departure from Princeton. In April 2009 Li won a contested election to serve as student class president her sophomore year. Li then ran unopposed in 2010 and 2011, retaining the title of student class president. She wrote her senior thesis on the ethics of climate change legislation and graduated in 2012 with a philosophy degree.

== Career ==
After college, Li worked as a financial analyst for Merck and Morgan Stanley.

=== Congressional campaigns ===
In 2016, Li announced her intention to run in Pennsylvania's 7th congressional district Democratic primary. Fewer than 4 months before the primary, she shifted her preliminary candidacy to Pennsylvania's 6th congressional district, citing advice from party leaders. Li would ultimately withdraw her candidacy in April 2016 prior to the primary, after a court challenge as to the validity of her candidacy petition signatures.

In 2018, Li was a candidate in Pennsylvania's 5th congressional district Democratic primary. During this campaign, Li described herself as a "tree-hugging progressive" who supported the legalization of marijuana, a national jobs guarantee, and opposed foreign policy interventionism. She sought the endorsement of the Philadelphia chapter of the Democratic Socialists of America and publicly praised Senator Bernie Sanders. Li lost the Democratic primary to Mary Gay Scanlon, placing sixth out of 10 candidates with 7.0% of the vote.

=== Democratic Party activity ===
In February 2020, Li tweeted she had traveled to New York for an interview with Fox News “to discuss the dangers of socialism.” Later that same week she tweeted a two-minute excerpt of a 1988 press conference in which Sanders had complimented the Moscow Metro: "#BernieSanders lavishes praise on Communist Russia, preferring the Soviet Union to the American way of life”. Her tweet was again subsequently retweeted by prominent social media political personalities, raising Li’s public profile and exposing her to online criticism from Sanders supporters. She resigned from her volunteer role as treasurer of the Pennsylvania Young Democrats two days later, citing the incident as her impetus for doing so. Two days after her resignation, Fox News published Li's interview that had been recorded the week prior, entitled “My Socialism Nightmare”, in which Li further attacked Sanders and his supporters.

After the 2020 Super Tuesday primary elections, Li appeared on Al Jazeera to debate Sanders supporter Linda Sarsour concerning which Democrat would be best to defeat Donald Trump. During the interview, Li stated that she would not vote for Sanders if he became the Democratic nominee.

In 2022, Li was named as co-chair of the Justice Unites Us Super PAC, announced as a multi-million-dollar fund “to drive grassroots engagement in the Asian American community”. The PAC would raise only $1.3M in the 2022 election cycle before its termination. The PAC stirred controversy when its only independent expenditure was shown to be $846,000 to assist candidate Carrick Flynn in a failed run for Oregon's 6th congressional district democratic primary. The PAC was later revealed to have been financed primarily by Protect Our Future, the Super PAC formed by then cryptocurrency entrepreneur, Sam Bankman-Fried.

In March 2023, on MS NOW, Li said, "Let's also not ignore the fact that CPAC has become a gathering of sexual predators. Let's be honest" and "Tonight, we have Trump, a serial rapist...So, this is the party that claims to be the party of Christian family values, and I have nothing to say or do but laugh at that!"

In August 2023, Li was named by then Pennsylvania Governor Josh Shapiro to his Governor's Advisory Commission on Asian American and Pacific Islander Affairs. In 2022 and 2023, Li was named by City & State Pennsylvania to several local 'power lists'; Li served on the City and State 'power lists' advisory board during this time.

During the 2024 Presidential election cycle, Li worked as a fundraising bundler for the DNC, a role which resulted in Li being variously referred to as being a member of the Democratic National Finance Committee, "Women’s co-chair", and "Mid-Atlantic regional chair" during this time.

In August 2024, Wired magazine named Li one of the top influencers shaping the presidential election. Li attended the 2024 Democratic National Convention via one of over 200 approved social media influencer credentials; this was the first time such credentials were distributed.

=== Pivot to Republican Party ===
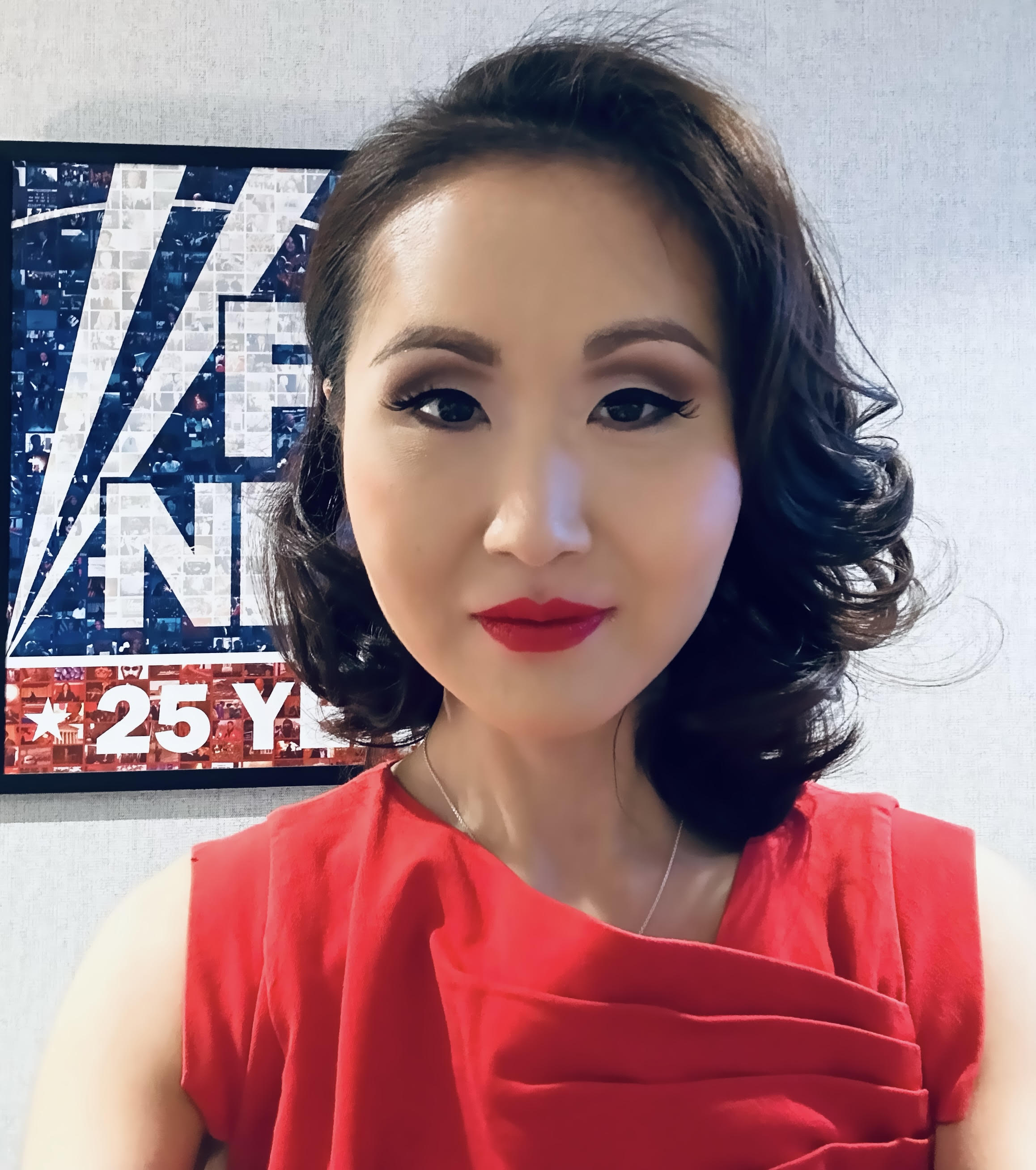
Li in January 2025

Following the 2024 United States presidential election, Li transitioned from being a supporter to being a critic of the Democratic Party. Li described the campaign of former Vice President Kamala Harris as a "$1 billion disaster," saying that Democratic donors were misled by the campaign to believe "that this is an eminently winnable race". In an interview on America's Newsroom, Li intensified her criticism, saying "I lost tens of thousands of followers because I dared to tell the truth. Because in a cult, you can't tell the truth," and ridiculed the notion of Harris running for Governor of California in 2026.

In January 2025, Li told Fox Business "I've been a conservative all my life". In an interview on Fox News, Li made clear she would no longer be supporting the Democratic Party stating that "leaving the Democratic Party or even questioning the Democratic Party is like leaving a cult. It's terrifying. I don't want to be a part of this craziness anymore." Li also expressed support for Pete Hegseth, Trump's nominee for Secretary of Defense. Li announced she was raising money for Trump and Republicans, despite her previously sharp criticism of Trump.

In May 2025, Li joined the female-led YouTube talk show, Her Take, featuring Ana Kasparian and Jillian Michaels.

On September 22, 2026, Li's debut book, Unburdened: A Former Democrat Insider's Shocking Account of Political Power, Betrayal, and Party Collapse, was published by the flagship Harper imprint of HarperCollins. Unburdened debuted on The New York Times nonfiction best-seller list for the week of October 11, 2026. The book landed on both the Combined Print & E-Book Nonfiction and Hardcover Nonfiction lists.

== Personal life ==
Li lives in the Rittenhouse Square neighborhood of Philadelphia.
