= Jonathan Saidel =

Philadelphia City Controller
- In office January 1, 1990 – January 2, 2006
- Preceded by: Joe Vignola^{[a]}
- Succeeded by: Alan Butkovitz

Personal details
- Born: Northeast Philadelphia
- Party: Democratic
- Spouse: Maria McLaughlin
- Children: Four
- Education: Temple University; Widener University School of Law
- Profession: Attorney, Politician, Accountant
- a.John Smithyman had served as Acting Controller from the time of Vignola's resignation, until Saidel was elected to the office.

Jonathan A. Saidel is a politician from Philadelphia, Pennsylvania. He is a former Philadelphia city controller.

== Political career ==
=== Philadelphia City Controller ===
After incumbent Philadelphia City Controller Joe Vignola announced his resignation in late 1987, in preparation for a campaign against incumbent Republican Senator John Heinz in 1988, Saidel announced his intention to enter the Democratic primary for the race to succeed him. He won the Democratic primary, held in the spring of 1989, and narrowly defeated the Republican nominee, State Senator Joe Rocks, in the fall general election.

He would go on to be re-elected to the position three more times, each by a wide margin. He did not seek re-election in 2005, and left office the following year.

=== Lieutenant gubernatorial campaign ===
Saidel sought the Democratic nomination for lieutenant governor in 2010. Ultimately came in second in a three-person field, ahead of Doris Smith-Ribner, a former Commonwealth Court Judge from Pittsburgh, and behind the winner, State Representative Scott Conklin of Philipsburg, Centre County. Conklin ultimately defeated Saidel by just under 4,000 votes, out of a total of over 900,000 votes cast.

== Post-political career ==
Saidel has since returned to private practice. He is Jewish.
