= 2010 Pennsylvania lieutenant gubernatorial election =

The Pennsylvania lieutenant gubernatorial election of 2010 was held on November 2, 2010. The winning candidates for Governor and Lieutenant Governor will serve a four-year term from 2011 to 2015. In Pennsylvania, the Lieutenant Governor is elected on the same ticket as the Governor, so the only campaign for this office was the primary election. As a result of Tom Corbett's election to the position of governor, Jim Cawley became the new Lieutenant Governor.

== Democratic primary ==
=== Candidates ===
- Scott Conklin, State Representative (from Philipsburg)
- Jonathan Saidel, former Philadelphia City Controller
- Doris Smith-Ribner, former Commonwealth Court Judge (from Pittsburgh)

=== Results ===
Democratic primary results
Party	Candidate	Votes	%
Democratic	Doris A. Smith-Ribner	267,033	29.8
Democratic	Scott H. Conklin	316,557	35.3
Democratic	Jonathan A. Saidel	312,749	34.9

As a result of the Democratic primary, Scott Conklin served as the running mate to Democratic gubernatorial candidate Dan Onorato.

== Republican primary ==
=== Candidates ===
- Jim Cawley, Bucks County Commissioner (from Middletown Township)
- Chet Beiler, manufacturing executive and 2008 Republican nominee for Auditor General (from Penn Township, Lancaster County)
- Russ Diamond, director of PACleanSweep (from Annville Township)
- Steve Johnson, home inspection executive (from York)
- John Kennedy, former State Representative (from Camp Hill)
- Billy McCue, business manager for a Roman Catholic church (from Carroll Township, Washington County)
- Daryl Metcalfe, State Representative (from Cranberry Township, Butler County)
- Jean Craige Pepper, financial executive and 2004 Republican nominee for Pennsylvania State Treasurer (from Millcreek Township, Erie County)
- Stephen Urban, Luzerne County Commissioner (from Wilkes-Barre)

=== Withdrew ===
- Carol Aichele, from Tredyffrin Township, Chester County

=== Results ===
Republican primary results
Party	Candidate	Votes	%
Republican	Steve Johnson	83,548	10.5
Republican	Jean Craige Pepper	66,619	8.4
Republican	Russ Diamond	35,707	4.5
Republican	Chet Beiler	163,762	20.6
Republican	Jim Cawley	209,441	26.3
Republican	Billy McCue	28,018	3.5
Republican	John Kennedy	72,409	9.1
Republican	Stephen A. Urban	35,676	4.5
Republican	Daryl Metcalfe	101,671	12.8

As a result of the Republican primary, Jim Cawley served as the running mate to Republican gubernatorial candidate Tom Corbett.

== See also ==
- 2010 Pennsylvania gubernatorial election
- 2010 United States Senate election in Pennsylvania
