= Doris Smith-Ribner =

Doris A. Smith-Ribner

Judge of the Pennsylvania Commonwealth Court
- In office January 3, 1988 – July 31, 2009
- Succeeded by: Johnny J. Butler

Personal details
- Born: Doris A. Smith; 1945 (age 80–81) Cleveland, Ohio, U.S.
- Party: Democratic
- Spouse: Paul Ribner
- Children: 1 daughter
- Education: University of Pittsburgh (Juris Doctor, 1972)

Doris A. Smith-Ribner (born 1945) is a former judge of the Pennsylvania Commonwealth Court.

== Formative years and family ==
Born in 1945, Doris Smith attended the University of Pittsburgh and the University of Pittsburgh School of Law, where she earned her Juris Doctor in 1972.

Smith-Ribner and her husband, former Philadelphia Common Pleas Judge Paul Ribner, have one daughter.

== Public service career ==
Following her graduation from law school, Smith-Ribner entered into private law practice in Allegheny County with law partner Byrd R. Brown. She served as solicitor for the Allegheny County Controller from 1980 to 1984. Smith-Ribner served as a judge of the Allegheny County Court of Common Pleas on an interim basis from 1984 to 1985. She was first elected to the Pennsylvania Commonwealth Court in 1987 and was re-elected in 1997 and 2007.

She retired from the court in 2009.

She was a candidate for the Democratic nomination for lieutenant governor in 2010.

In addition, her career in government, prior to her unsuccessful campaign for the position of lieutenant governor, included five years as a member of the Pennsylvania Human Relations Commission, service as chair of the Pennsylvania Supreme Court's Disciplinary Board Hearing Committee, and eleven years as a member of the Pennsylvania Judicial Auditing Agency.

== See also ==
- List of African-American jurists
