= Blue Collar Caucus =

- Abbreviation: BCC
- Co-chairs: Brendan Boyle; Marc Veasey
- Founded: December 1, 2016; 9 years ago
- Ideology: Progressivism; Keynesianism; Laborism
- Political position: Left-wing
- National affiliation: Democratic Party
- Colors: Electric blue
- Seats in the House: 29 / 435 (Note: This figure does not include Eleanor Holmes Norton, a non-voting delegate who is a member of the caucus.)
- Seats in the House Democratic Caucus: 29 / 214

The Blue Collar Caucus is a United States Democratic Party congressional caucus that advocates for labor and working class priorities. It was founded in 2016 to focus the Democratic Party on blue-collar issues. The caucus is considered economically progressive. According to its founders, the goal is to re-orient the Democratic Party to focus on issues such as trade unions, wage stagnation, offshoring and job insecurity, especially in case of manufacturing and building workers. It also seeks to protect American workers from globalized competition, make domestic manufacturing viable, and cultivate industries that can provide stable employment.

== History ==
=== Formation ===
The formation of the caucus was declared on 1 December 2016 by Democratic congressmen Marc Veasey (Texas-33) and Brendan F. Boyle (Pennsylvania-13), who became its co-chairs and stated that the caucus would aim "to focus Congressional efforts on alleviating the economic anxiety felt by working class Americans that was so pronounced in the 2016 election, and re-engage Democratic efforts to reach these voters."

Boyle and Veasey became friends in January 2015, and bonded over having similar socioeconomic backgrounds, as well as sharing the sentiment that their party failed to fully represent their political viewpoint. The idea of creating the Blue Collar Caucus originated from a conversation Boyle had with one of its constituents; during the conversation, Boyle's constituent suggested creating a caucus that would specifically represent blue-collar workers. Later in December 2016, Veasey and Boyle began circulating letters inviting other congressmen to join the caucus, with Donald Norcross (New Jersey-1) being the first to join.

By February 2017, the caucus had reached 26 members. Its co-chairs took different approaches to the 2017 inauguration of Donald Trump, as Boyle boycotted the inauguration, while Veasey attended it. Boyle argued that Trump was the only candidate who paid attention to industrial plants in his district closing and moving operations to Mexico. At the same time, both co-chairs declared their intention "to keep the pressure up on their Republican colleagues to express their criticisms of Trump in public." They announced meetings with blue collar leaders and trips around the country to help the Democrats understand their loss in the 2016 presidential election. In March 2017, the caucus hosted a listening session with labor leaders such as Terry O'Sullivan, Bob Martinez, and James Boland.

=== Trump's first presidency ===
==== 2017 ====
The caucus met 4 times in total in 2017, and hosted leaders of AFL-CIO and the International Association of Machinists and Aerospace Workers. In April 2017, the caucus co-chairs signed a letter denouncing Trump's meeting with Xi Jinping at Mar-a-Lago and demanding Trump to combat unfair trade practices of Chinese companies. The same month, they expressed relief that Andy Puzder, Trump's nominee for Secretary of Labor, resigned; the caucus criticized his "anti-worker record". Alexander Acosta was subsequently confirmed for the position. In May 2017, the caucus released a statement criticizing Trump's 2018 United States federal budget proposal for including cuts to the Department of Transportation, TIGER grants, and other infrastructure investments. The caucus stated that it would hold Trump accountable for his promises made to working-class voters; it demanded a "blue collar budget" instead that would demonstrate Trump's commitment to "America First" principles.

In September 2017, Boyle proposed The Patriot Employer Act that would punish companies for offshoring and reward them with tax credits for keeping jobs in the United States, offering high wages and employing war veterans. In August 2017, Boyle launched the Public Service Loan Forgiveness (PSLF) Caucus together with the Republican congressman Ryan Costello (Pennsylvania-6). In December 2017, the caucus opposed the overhaul of the Higher Education Act proposed by the House Republicans known as the PROSPER Act. Boyle criticized it for including cuts to the student loan repayment programs and proposed expanding loan forgiveness programs instead, along with reducing their interest rates. The same year, he also co-sponsored the Medicare for All Act.

==== 2018 ====
In January 2018, Boyle introduced the Stable Genius Act that would require presidential candidates to undergo medical examination and have its results made public before the election. The same month, Boyle expressed his disappointment that Trump withdrew from the talks on a bipartisan immigration package. The package would have extended the possibility of obtaining legal status to immigrants affected by the DREAM Act but restrict them from sponsoring their family members, eliminated the diversity visa lottery, and funded border projects such as constructing a physical barrier on the border. In March 2018, Joe Biden met with the Caucus to discuss 2018 midterm campaigning. In June 2018, the caucus condemned the Janus v. AFSCME ruling, calling it "a wolf in sheep's clothing" and "a case brought by billionaires in the name of ‘fairness' to employees who benefit from collective bargaining but don't want to pay their fair share". By November 2018, the Blue Collar Caucus had 49 members, reaching its peak.

Throughout 2018, the caucus members met with representatives of General Motors and Toyota, and with Pennsylvania labor leaders, where they spoke of the job loss caused by trade deals. The caucus co-chairs criticized the 2018 tax cuts passed by the Congress, calling it an example of trickle-down economics and arguing that it resulted in an average cut of $40,000 for the wealthiest 1% and only $980 for an average American. In January 2019, Boyle and Veasey, along with Jan Schakowsky (Illinois-9), a fellow Blue Collar Caucus member, introduced the Patriot Employer Act, which would close tax loopholes abused by companies while providing a tax credit to companies that provide "fair wages and good benefits to workers". In March 2019, Boyle criticized Trump's budget request for the proposed cuts to health insurance, transportation funding, and the Supplemental Nutrition Assistance Program.

==== Final years ====
In April 2019, regarding the opioid crisis, Boyle declared that he was "very concerned with the concept of safe-injection sites", stating that they fail to address the underlying cause and would be unfair to the people in the neighborhood they would be placed in. In May 2019, United Steelworkers met with the caucus met to advocate the passage of the PRO Act (H.R. 2474), a labor law bill that, if signed, would have protected workers from employer's retaliation regarding union organizing and other workplace collective actions, and increased penalties for workers' rights violations. In October 2019, the caucus introduced the Women in Apprenticeship and Nontraditional Occupations Amendment Act, which would expand the Women in Apprenticeship and Nontraditional Occupations (WANTO) program beyond the six grants it issued to at least one grant per each state and territory. The same year, Boyle postulated increasing the minimum wage to $15 an hour by 2024, and co-sponsored the Debt-Free College Act of 2019 and the Green New Deal.

In July 2020, Boyle secured the inclusion of the caucus' proposals in the Moving Forward Act, including the Innovative Energy Manufacturing Act (H.R.5165) to facilitate domestic job creation. The provisions of the Blue Collar Caucus included the revival of the Advanced Manufacturing Tax Credit, additional tax benefits for renewable energy projects, extending Davis-Bacon labor standards to apply to energy sector jobs, banning the Amtrak Call Center in Northeast Philadelphia from outsourcing its jobs, $140 billion in funding to school building reconstruction and remediation, and $25 billion in funding the Drinking Water State Revolving Fund. The Advanced Manufacturing Tax Credit included in the bill was a program of expanding the American manufacturing industry through clean energy projects that used exclusively US-made equipment. Another provision secured was additional funding to the federal-aid highway program in Pennsylvania, the Federal Transit Administration aid, and high speed rail PRIME grants.

=== Later activities ===
In 2021, the caucus was described as one of the five major groups operating within the Democratic Party, representing a laborist and Keynesian agenda. In March 2021, the caucus co-chair Veasey celebrated the passage of the Protecting the Right to Organize (PRO) Act in the House of Representatives, which if signed into law, would have protected the right to unionize and the right to collective bargaining. The same month, Boyle co-sponsored the Ultra-Millionaire Tax Act of 2021 along with Senator Elizabeth Warren and Representative Pramila Jayapal (Washington-7). The act proposed a 2% annual tax on households and trusts with a net worth above $50 million, and a 1% annual surtax (3% tax overall) on those with a net worth above $1 billion. It also proposed measures against tax evasion such as a 30% minimum audit rate for taxpayers affected, and a 40% exit tax on those renouncing their US citizenship with a net worth above $50 million. As the co-founder of the caucus, Boyle promoted the act as a "fundamentally blue-collar policy".

In 2022, Boyle expressed his belief that Joe Biden made efforts to bridge the gap between the Democratic Party and working-class voters. In November 2022, a member of the caucus, Tim Ryan, contested a Senate election in Ohio. He was noted for being a member of the caucus and presenting himself as a "traditional unionist Democrat focused on the rights of blue-collar workers" who supported bringing back manufacturing jobs to the US while opposing defunding the police and criticizing Biden's student loan forgiveness policies. Ultimately, Ryan lost the election to JD Vance, who became Vice President under Donald Trump in 2025.

In 2023, Boyle criticized the Democratic Party's overreliance on "college-educated voters with higher incomes in cities and suburbs" at expense of the working class. He claimed, however, that Biden "clearly gets that", noting his Midwestern roots. Following the defeat of the Democratic Party in the 2024 presidential election, Brendan Boyle confirmed holding talks on "revving" the Blue Collar Caucus to "address our party's clear and consistent underperformance with working-class voters". In December 2024, Boyle argued that the Democratic Party's loss of blue-collar voters in the 2024 election was caused by a cultural disconnect, stating: "To too many working-class Americans of all different races and ethnicities, our party brand is that we represent people that aren't like them. And that's a real problem. I think it's more about culture and social issues than it is economic issues."

In 2025, Boyle condemned the 2025 United States federal mass layoffs, noting their nationwide impact as more than 80% of federal jobs were based outside of the Washington metropolitan area. In March 2025, the caucus held a hall meeting with the Pennsylvania AFL–CIO, where it spoke with federal workers. Boyle also spoke against the 2025 House Budget Resolution for including $880 billion cuts to Medicaid. He criticized President Trump's 2025 tariffs for targeting US allies such as Canada and the European Union countries; Boyle argued that tariffs instead need a "tailored approach" and should be used to combat "steel dumping from Asia" and target countries of which companies engage in unfair labor practices. Boyle also reiterated his view that Democratic Party needs to change its approach towards the working class, stating his concern about the fact that the party's popularity had improved amongst college-educated voters but further declined amongst the working class.

In December 2025, Veasey declared that he will not run for re-election in the House, and would instead run for Tarrant County Judge. However, he suspended his campaign a week later, and announced that he will not seek any political office in 2026. In March 2026, he explained that he felt out of options after his district was redrawn, but that he might return to politics later.

== Ideology ==
The goal of the caucus is to help "reconnect the [Democratic] party with the working-class voters that, for so many decades, formed the core of its base". The caucus represents pro-labor and alter-globalization Democrats. Brendan Boyle, who co-founded the caucus, said that he decided to found it because he became "concerned about the party’s declining fortunes with the working-class voters who have always been the backbone of the Democratic Party." The caucus focused itself on workers’ rights; it argues that the US has failed to protect its blue-collar workers from declining pay and depleting opportunities, especially the workers with high school education or lower. It also strives "to pass a real infrastructure bill, strengthen the middle class, and create good-paying jobs."

The caucus is considered a part of the network of left-leaning groups that forms the progressive Democrats, together with the Congressional Progressive Caucus and Medicare for All Caucus. Postulates of the progressive Democrats shared by the Blue Collar Caucus include free colleges, Medicare for All, $15 federal minimum wage, a social democratic system based on the Scandinavian model, and prohibition of corporate PAC donations. Speaking on the caucus, its co-chairs Boyle and Veasey described themselves as left-of-center, and Boyle also described himself as progressive. During its meetings, the caucus hosted the leaders of major trade unions such as AFL-CIO and IAMAW, and was consulted by the United Steelworkers to advocate the passage of pro-labor bills.

The Blue Collar Caucus is considered to represent reformist progressivism, which advocates greater state intervention and promotion of social justice in the economy, and seeks to "humanize" capitalism through progressive reforms. The caucus declares that it "supports unions and focuses on addressing wage stagnation, offshoring, and job insecurity for those in the manufacturing and building trades." It has been described as economically progressive, Keynesian,, and laborist. Its co-chairs introduced the Patriot Employer Act which aimed to "close loopholes that encourage corporations to send jobs overseas, and provide tax credits to employers that invest in American workers, pay fair wages, and provide employees with robust benefits." They also introduced the Women in Apprenticeship and Nontraditional Occupations Amendment Act that would expand support for women in apprenticeship programs. It did not explicitly address the issue of climate change, although many of its members signed the Green New Deal Resolution in 2019.

=== Main postulates ===
According to Jeff Greenfield, the group strives to "push for higher wages and new manufacturing jobs". The caucus' co-chairs voted against the TPP agreement, and spoke against NAFTA. Boyle called for transparency of Trump administration's renegotiation of NAFTA, stating that it would help "to avert the damage that unfettered free trade has done to American workers". The caucus co-chair Boyle called for fair trade, arguing that hitherto trade practices "cost foreign workers their rights and dignity, and cost U.S. workers their jobs", and the "CEO pay skyrocket while wages are stagnant, as firms struggle to compete with low foreign costs." He also declared support for "Buy America" policies, stating the need to combat "steel dumping" and calling for anti-dumping legislation that would target China and protect domestic steel industries. He proposed legislation that would punish offshoring while promoting "Patriot Employers" that "empower the American workforce by recruiting veterans, paying fair wages, and contributing to retirement security."

One of the main goals established by the caucus is increasing the US minimum wage to a living wage. The party's co-chair Boyle postulated raising the federal minimum wage to $15, and co-sponsored the Medicare for All Act of 2017, which proposed providing universal coverage under the Medicare program. Boyle was also the co-sponsor of the Debt-Free College Act of 2019, as well as the Ultra-Millionaire Tax Act of 2021 which would have implemented a wealth tax of 2% on households and trusts with a net worth above $50 million, with an additional 1% surtax in case of a net worth above $1 billion. He also co-founded the Public Service Loan Forgiveness Caucus, postulating expanding loan forgiveness programs and reducing interest rates for student loans. He supported the 2018 bipartisan immigration package that would have granted legal citizenship to the immigrants affected by the DREAM Act while restricting immigration law and allocating $1.6 billion for physical barriers on the border, and criticized Trump for withdrawing from it.

Boyle and Veasey argue that the United States had missed its opportunity to protect its blue-collar workers from the impact of globalization, trade deals, immigration, and Great Migration. They stated that government's negligence led to a collapse of the quality of life in the Midwest, noting what while Detroit had one of the highest income per capita in the 1950s and 1960s USA, the layoffs and shutdowns of industrial plants led to the breakup of family ties, increases in drug use, incarceration, opioid crisis, and lack of opportunities amongst the working class. Both co-chairs believe that the Democratic Party lost the working class because of its stances and focus on non-economic issues. They condemned the "elites on our side" which were willing to cede working-class areas to the Republican Party in favor of affluent constituencies. They also postulated reviving the American manufacturing, noting that manufacturing makes up 24% of German GDP while it is 3-4 times lower for the United States, and reversing the decline of unionization amongst the American workers.

=== Partisan outlook ===
The caucus declared that it hopes to find common ground with Trump in areas where he differs from traditional Republicans, including preserving Social Security and Medicare, "striking trade deals that safeguard American workers", and investing in infrastructure. On Trump's victory, the caucus wrote: "It makes sense that President Trump's economic message appealed to blue collar workers and their families. They rightfully felt like they were forgotten, left behind by a growing economy and by a political system that was prioritizing other issues." The caucus sought "to hold President Trump accountable for his promises to working people". The co-chair of the caucus, Marc Veasey, criticized the Democratic Party, arguing that it had abandoned the center of the country for coastal strongholds such as the states of California and New York. He also stated that the party had become isolated from the working-class problems such as maintaining their jobs, while Veasey's associate criticized the party for "marching left on social issues".

Given its laborist and trade-unionist agenda, it is considered to fall on the "conservative" side of the spectrum amongst Democratic progressives regarding "new agenda" issues like environmental justice, focusing on vulnerable communities, and welcoming immigrants. On Boyle's congressional website, the caucus reposted Paul Kane's Washington Post article in which he juxtaposed the focus of the Blue Collar Caucus members on economic issues with other Democrats' focus on social issues, including sessions with celebrities that "are certainly not there to teach Democrats how to connect with lunch-pail voters." Boyle argued that the Blue Collar Caucus aims to address the disconnect between the Democratic Party and the working class, stating there is a cultural disconnect that concerns social and cultural issues rather than economic ones, as the workers feel that Democratic Party's "brand is that we represent people that aren’t like them". The Orange County Register described the caucus as "an update to the bygone alliance of moderate “Blue Dogs”."

Writing on Boyle's efforts to shape the policy of the Democratic Party through the Blue Collar Caucus, Philadelphia compared Boyle to the Berniecrats, stating that his "economic populism appeals to some of the same people who voted for Trump". At the same time, Boyle criticized the sanctuary city policy of Philadelphia and voted for abortion restrictions early in his career. Journalist Holly Otterbein argued that to some progressives, his and his brother's (Kevin Boyle) positions on immigration and police shootings "sell out people of color". Boyle argued that the Democratic Party should accommodate differing views on social issues such as abortion and gun control, stating that the Democrats should moderate on social issues and focus on economic policies in order to win working-class support.

== Caucus members ==
The caucus continues to exist as of the 119th United States Congress. In February 2018, it had 35 members. The caucus was at its peak during the 115th United States Congress, when it had 49 members throughout 2018. In 2026, the caucus had 30 members. Some of the Blue Collar Caucus are also members of the New Democrat Coalition, and the Blue Dog Coalition, Medicare for All Caucus, and the Problem Solvers Caucus.

The caucus' co-chairs, Boyle and Veasey, had working-class upbringings, and the membership of the Blue Collar Caucus is correlated towards the less affluent members of the Congress. However, the caucus still has had wealthy members, with nearly half of its 2020 members having a median wealth above that of an average member of Congress. The wealthiest members of the Blue Collar Caucus were Vicente Gonzalez, John Yarmuth and Debbie Dingell, while three members of the caucus did not have a four-year degree: Bob Brady, Donald Norcross, and Donald Payne Jr.

=== Current members ===
State	District	Member	Ref.
California	CA-3	John Garamendi	
California	CA-17	Ro Khanna	
California	CA-26	Julia Brownley	
California	CA-46	Lou Correa	
California	CA-52	Juan Vargas	
Connecticut	CT-1	John Larson	
Connecticut	CT-2	Joe Courtney	
Washington, D.C.	DC (Note: Representatives from the District of Columbia are non-voting delegates.)	Eleanor Holmes Norton	
Florida	FL-14	Kathy Castor	
Illinois	IL-9	Jan Schakowsky	
Maine	ME-1	Chellie Pingree	
Massachusetts	MA-3	Lori Trahan	
Massachusetts	MA-6	Seth Moulton	
Massachusetts	MA-8	Stephen F. Lynch	
Michigan	MI-12	Debbie Dingell	
Michigan	MI-13	Shri Thanedar	
Nevada	NV-1	Dina Titus	
New Jersey	NJ-1	Donald Norcross	
New Jersey	NJ-12	Bonnie Watson Coleman	
New York	NY-6	Grace Meng	
New York	NY-7	Nydia Velázquez	
New York	NY-20	Paul Tonko	
North Carolina	NC-12	Alma Adams	
Ohio	OH-9	Marcy Kaptur	
Pennsylvania	PA-2	Brendan Boyle (co-chairman)	
Pennsylvania	PA-7	Mary Gay Scanlon	
Texas	TX-15	Vicente Gonzalez Jr.	
Texas	TX-33	Marc Veasey (co-chairman)	
Washington	WA-6	Derek Kilmer	
Wisconsin	WI-2	Mark Pocan	

=== Former members ===
- Louise Slaughter (New York-25) — died in 2018;
- Luis Gutierrez (Illinois-4) — retired in 2019;
- Bob Brady (Pennsylvania-1) — retired in 2019;
- Rick Nolan (Minnesota-6) — retired in 2019;
- Carol Shea-Porter (New Hamphshire-1) — retired in 2019;
- Katie Hill (California-18) — resigned in 2019;
- Daniel Lipinski (Illinois-3) — defeated in the 2020 primary;
- Abby Finkenauer (Iowa-1) — lost re-election in 2020;
- Dave Loebsack (Iowa-2) — retired in 2020;
- Alcee Hastings (Florida-20) — died in 2021;
- Anthony Brown (Maryland-4) — left the House to become attorney general of Maryland in 2023;
- Alan Lowenthal (California-47) — retired in 2023;
- Cheri Bustos (Illinois-17) — retired in 2023;
- John Yarmuth (Kentucky-3) — retired in 2023;
- Tim Ryan (Ohio-17) — left the House in 2023 to contest a Senate election;
- Brian Higgins (New York-26) — resigned in 2024;
- Donald Payne Jr. (New Jersey-10) — died in 2024;
- Bill Pascrell (New Jersey-9) — died in 2024;
- Matt Cartwright (Pennsylvania-8) — lost re-election in 2024;
- Ruben Gallego (Arizona-3) — left the House to become Senator in 2025;
- Raúl Grijalva (Arizona-7) — died in 2025;
- Dan Kildee (Michigan-5) — retired in 2025;
- Annie Kuster (New Hampshire-2) — retired in 2025.

== See also ==
- Congressional Progressive Caucus
- Labor Caucus (United States)
- Reagan Democrat
