= Very stable genius =

Very stable genius may refer to:

- A tweet made by Donald Trump in January 2018; see Timeline of the Donald Trump presidency (2018 Q1)
- A Very Stable Genius, a 2020 book about Trump's presidency by Philip Rucker and Carol Leonnig
- A Very Stable Genius!, a 2018 book by cartoonist Mike Luckovich
- Stable Genius Act, a proposed Act of Congress introduced in 2018
