= Pennsylvania House of Representatives, District 174 =

American legislative district

Pennsylvania's 174th State House of Representatives district
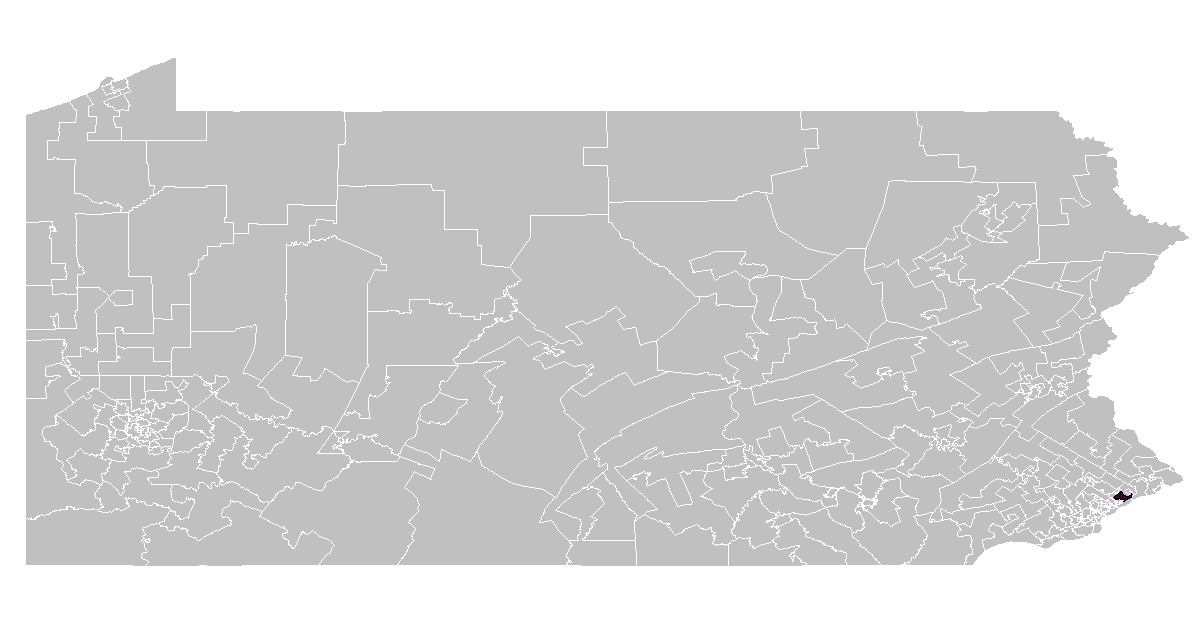
Representative
Ed Neilson; D–Philadelphia

The 174th Pennsylvania House of Representatives District is located in Philadelphia County and includes the following areas:

- Ward 56 [PART, Divisions 02, 05, 06, 10, 11, 12, 16, 17, 18, 19, 20, 21, 22, 23, 24, 25, 26, 27, 28, 29, 30, 31, 35, 36, 37, 38, 39 and 41]
- Ward 57 [PART, Divisions 01, 02, 03, 04, 05, 06, 07, 08, 09, 10, 11, 12, 15, 16, 17, 18, 19, 20, 21, 22, 23, 24, 25, 26, 27 and 28]
- Ward 58 [PART, Divisions 11 and 28]
- Ward 66 [PART, Divisions 19, 21, 25, 26, 27, 28 and 46]

== Representatives ==
Representative	Party	Years	District home	Note
Prior to 1969, seats were apportioned by county.
Max Pievsky	Democrat	1969 – 1990		
Alan L. Butkovitz	Democratic	1991 – 2005		Resigned December 31, 2005.
John P. Sabatina, Jr.	Democratic	2006 – 2015		Elected on March 14, 2006, to fill vacancy Resigned upon election to Pennsylvania Senate, District 5
Ed Neilson	Democratic	2015 – present		Elected on August 11, 2015, to fill vacancy Previously represented the 169th Legislative District from 2012−2014
