= Joe Picozzi =

Pennsylvania politician (born 1995)

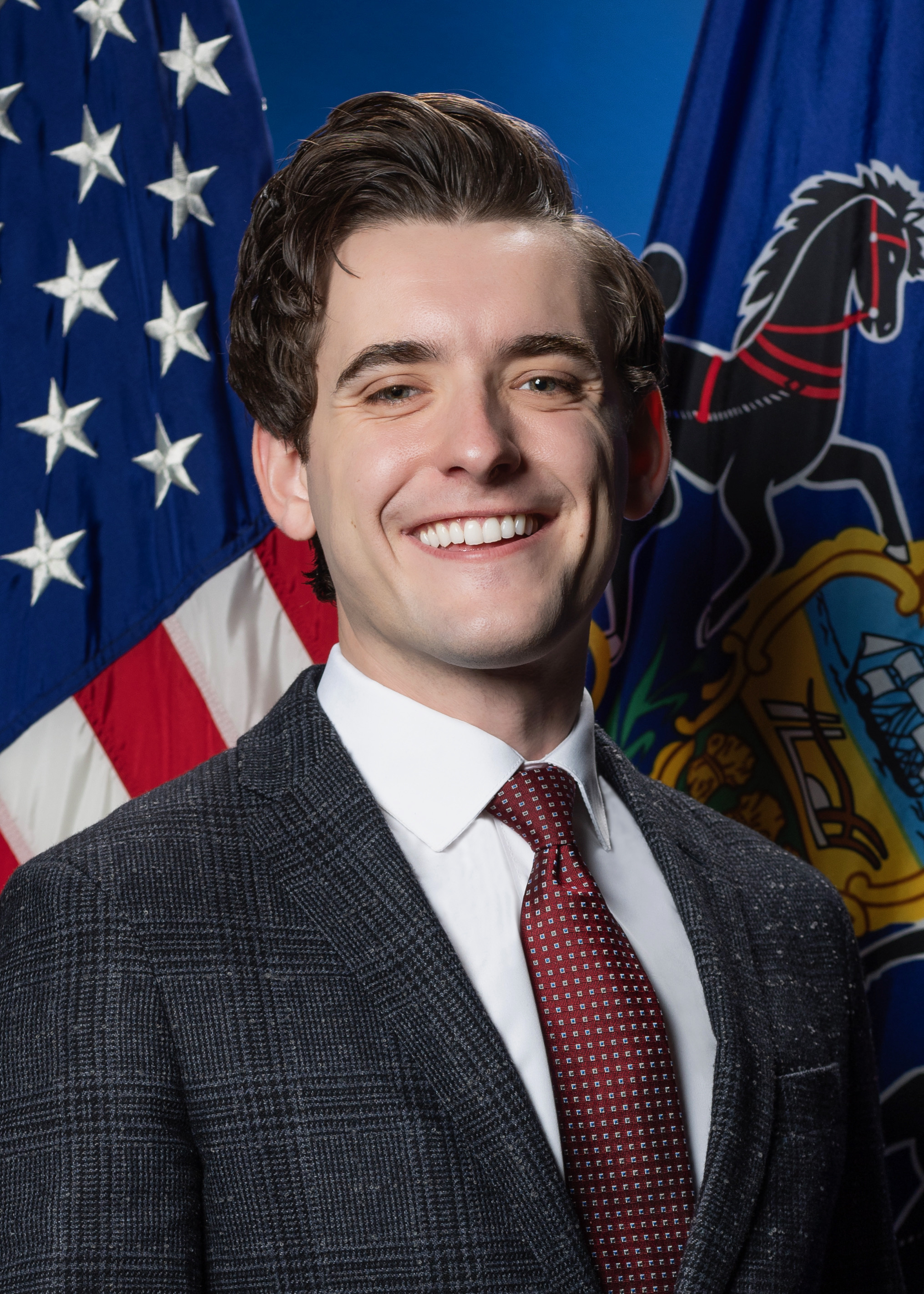
- Official portrait, 2025

Member of the Pennsylvania State Senate from the 5th district
- Incumbent
- Assumed office January 3, 2025
- Preceded by: Jimmy Dillon

Personal details
- Born: April 21, 1995 (age 31) Philadelphia, Pennsylvania, U.S.
- Party: Republican
- Education: Georgetown University

Joseph Samuel Picozzi (born April 22, 1995) is an American politician from the Somerton neighborhood of Philadelphia currently serving as a Pennsylvania State Senator from District 5. A member of the Republican Party, he was elected to represent District 5 of the Pennsylvania State Senate in the 2024 US elections, defeating Democratic incumbent Jimmy Dillon who was elected in a 2022 special election to replace John Sabatina, who resigned to serve on a Court of Common Pleas. Both candidates ran unopposed in their respective party primaries.

== Early life and education ==
Picozzi's parents are a retired deputy fire chief and the former director of rehabilitation at the now-closed Hahnemann Hospital. He graduated from Holy Ghost Preparatory School. Picozzi studied government at Georgetown University. He has worked as a senior advisor in strategic planning at the Manhattan Institute and an assistant to US House Speaker Kevin McCarthy. He is an Eagle Scout. Picozzi now lives in Tacony.

== Political career ==
In 2017, Picozzi was a finalist for that year's "30 under 30" list produced by Red Alert Politics, due in part to his campaigning in the 2016 US elections. The Erie Times-News reported early in the campaign that although District 5 is heavily Democratic, Republican strategists saw the seat as a "potential pick-up". By flipping District 5, Picozzi is the first Republican to represent Philadelphia in the State Senate in over two decades.

For the 2025-2026 Session, Picozzi sits on the following committees in the State Senate:

- Urban Affairs & Housing (Chair)
- Law & Justice (Vice Chair)
- Appropriations
- Communications & Technology
- Game & Fisheries
- Intergovernmental Operations
- Labor & Industry

== Electoral history ==
2024 Republican primary for Pennsylvania State Senate District 5
Party	Candidate	Votes	%
Republican	Joe Picozzi	6,818	99.6
Republican	Other/write-in votes	25	0.4

2024 general election for Pennsylvania State Senate District 5
Party	Candidate	Votes	%
Republican	Joe Picozzi	50,570	50.3
Democratic	Jimmy Dillon (incumbent)	49,735	49.5
Other	Other/write-in votes	134	0.1
