= James R. Lloyd =

American politician

James R. Lloyd, Jr.

Member of the Pennsylvania Senate from the 5th district
- In office April 23, 1979 – November 30, 1984
- Preceded by: Charles Dougherty
- Succeeded by: Frank Salvatore

Personal details
- Born: January 27, 1950 Philadelphia, Pennsylvania, U.S.
- Died: August 18, 1989 (aged 39) Philadelphia, Pennsylvania, U.S.
- Resting place: Holy Sepulchre Cemetery, Cheltenham, Pennsylvania, U.S.
- Party: Democratic

James R. "Jim" Lloyd Jr. (January 27, 1950 - August 18, 1989) was an American politician from Pennsylvania who served as a Democratic member of the Pennsylvania State Senate for the 5th district from 1979 until 1984.

He died of brain cancer on August 18, 1989, while serving as an aide to Pennsylvania Governor Robert P. Casey He is interred at the Holy Sepulchre Cemetery in Cheltenham, Pennsylvania.

Pennsylvania State Senate
Preceded by Charles Dougherty	Member of the Pennsylvania Senate for the 5th District; 1979–1984	Succeeded by Frank Salvatore
Party political offices
Preceded by Bob Casey	Democratic nominee for Lieutenant Governor of Pennsylvania; 1982	Succeeded by Mark Singel
