= Alvin Katz =

American politician

Member of the Pennsylvania House of Representatives from the 170th district
- In office January 3, 1971 – November 30, 1972
- Preceded by: Tom Gola
- Succeeded by: Frank A. Salvatore

Personal details
- Born: August 30, 1936 (age 90) Philadelphia, Pennsylvania, United States
- Party: Republican

Alvin Katz (born August 30, 1936) is a former Republican member of the Pennsylvania House of Representatives.
