= George T. Kenney =

American politician (born 1957)

George T. Kenney, Jr.

Member of the Pennsylvania House of Representatives from the 170th district
- In office January 3, 1985 – November 30, 2008
- Preceded by: Frank A. Salvatore
- Succeeded by: Brendan F. Boyle

Personal details
- Born: October 29, 1957 (age 68) Philadelphia, Pennsylvania
- Party: Republican
- Spouse: Elizabeth
- Children: Devon Kenney, Carter Kenney, George Kenney lll, Paige Kenney, Taylor Kenney
- Education: La Salle University
- Website: www.georgekenney.com

George T. Kenney Jr. (born October 29, 1957) is a former Republican member of the Pennsylvania House of Representatives. He represented the 170th District from 1985 to 2008.

== Formative years ==
Born in the city of Philadelphia, Pennsylvania on October 29, 1957, Kenney graduated from LaSalle High School and then earned a Bachelor of Science degree from LaSalle College in 1982. He was subsequently employed in pharmaceutical sales with McNeil Pharmaceutical.

== Family ==
Kenney and his wife Elizabeth live in Philadelphia, Pennsylvania and have 5 children.

== Political career ==
Treasurer and leader of the 58th Ward Republican Executive Committee, Kenney was elected to the Pennsylvania House of Representatives in 1984, and then reelected to eleven additional consecutive terms. Appointed to the Pennsylvania Commission on Crime and Delinquency (1997-2002), he did not stand for reelection to the House in 2008, but was elected that year as an alternate delegate to the 2008 Republican National Convention.

He was succeeded in the House by Democrat Brendan F. Boyle.

== Later professional life ==
Kenney has served as the assistant vice president for government affairs, Health Sciences at Temple University.
