= Max Pievsky =

American politician

Member of the Pennsylvania House of Representatives from the 174th district
- In office January 7, 1969 – November 30, 1990
- Preceded by: District Created
- Succeeded by: Alan Butkovitz

Member of the Pennsylvania House of Representatives from the Philadelphia County district
- In office January 2, 1967 – November 30, 1968

Personal details
- Born: July 4, 1925 (age 101) Philadelphia, Pennsylvania, U.S.
- Party: Democratic

Max Pievsky (born July 4, 1925) is an American former Democratic politician who served as a member of the Pennsylvania House of Representatives.
