= Frank A. Salvatore =

American politician

Member of the Pennsylvania Senate from the 5th district
- In office January 1, 1985 – January 2, 2001
- Preceded by: James Lloyd
- Succeeded by: Mike Stack

Member of the Pennsylvania House of Representatives from the 170th district
- In office January 2, 1973 – November 30, 1984
- Preceded by: Alvin Katz
- Succeeded by: George Kenney

Personal details
- Born: June 2, 1922 Philadelphia, Pennsylvania, U.S.
- Died: July 16, 2014 (aged 92) Meadowbrook, Pennsylvania, U.S.
- Party: Republican
- Spouse: Gloria Leggieri

Frank A. Salvatore (June 2, 1922 – July 16, 2014) was an American politician from Pennsylvania who served as a Republican member of the Pennsylvania State Senate for the 5th district from 1985 to 2001 and the Pennsylvania House of Representatives for the 170th district from 1973 to 1984.

== Early life and education ==
Salvatore was born in Philadelphia, Pennsylvania and graduated from Northeast High School. He attended St Joseph's College of Industrial Relations and took courses at the Fels Institute of Government at the University of Pennsylvania. He received an honorary doctorate degree from Holy Family College. He served as a U.S. Marine sergeant in the Pacific Theater during World War II from 1942 to 1945.

== Career ==
In 1958, Salvatore became the chairman of L&M Beverage Co. Inc., a wholesale beer distributor and operated the business until he sold it in 2001.

He was elected to the Pennsylvania House of Representatives for the 170th district and served for five consecutive terms. He was elected Minority Caucus Administrator from 1977 to 1978 and again from 1983 to 1984. He was elected Majority Caucus Administrator from 1979 to 1982. He was not a candidate for reelection to the House in 1984.

He was elected to the Pennsylvania State Senate for the 5th district and served from 1985 to 2000. He was an outspoken critic of Mayor Wilson Goode. He presented the legislature with a bill proposing secession of Northeast Philadelphia from the rest of the city to form an entity called Liberty County but it found no broad political support. He lost reelection to the Senate in 2000.

He died in July 2014 at a Holy Redeemer Hospital in Meadowbrook, Pennsylvania and is interred at the Resurrection Cemetery in Philadelphia.
