= Jimmy Dillon =

American politician (born 1979)

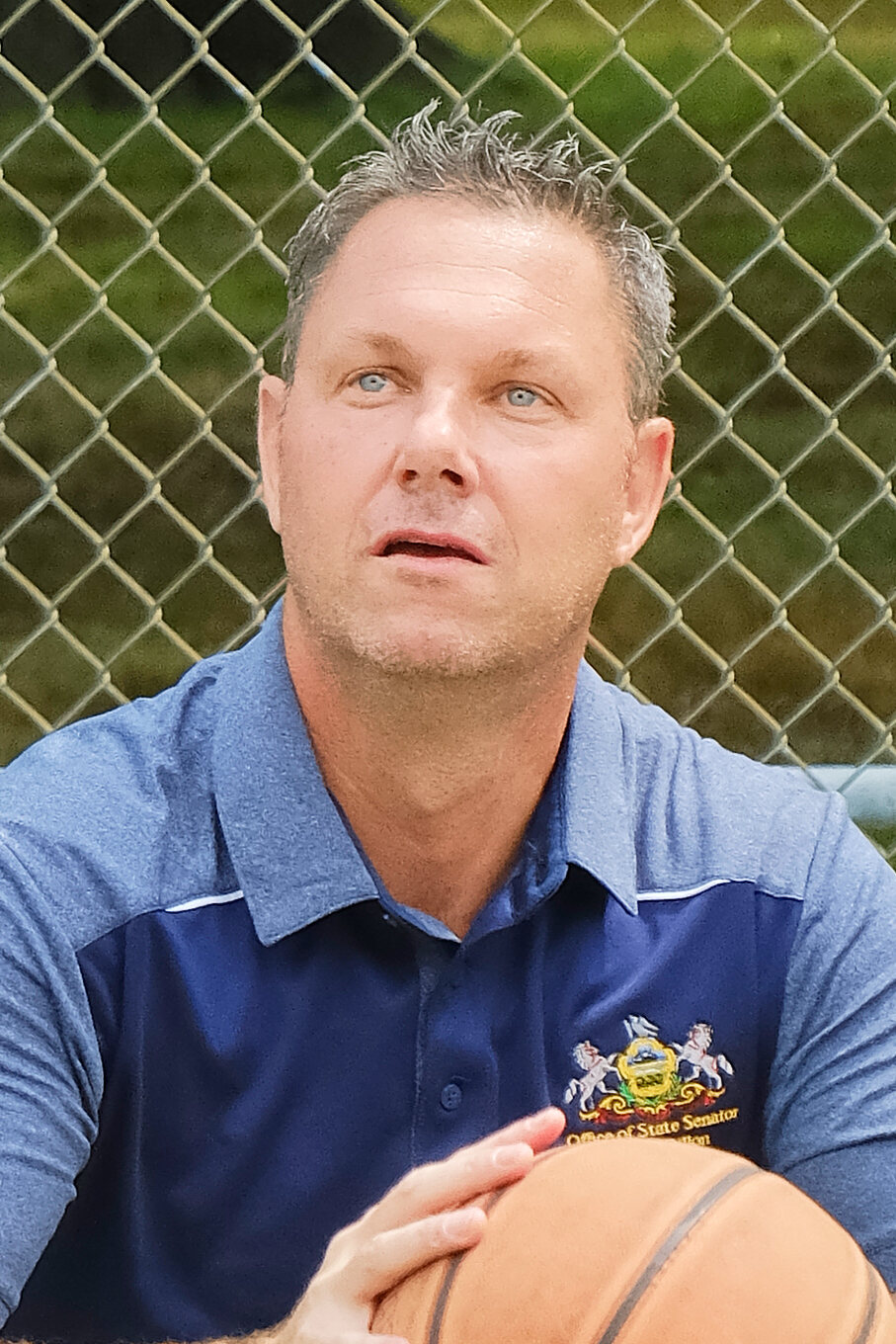

Member of the Pennsylvania Senate from the 5th district
- In office June 7, 2022 – November 30, 2024
- Preceded by: John Sabatina
- Succeeded by: Joe Picozzi

Personal details
- Born: January 15, 1979 (age 47) Northeast Philadelphia, Pennsylvania, U.S.
- Party: Democratic
- Education: University of Notre Dame

Jimmy Dillon (born January 15, 1979) is an American politician who was a Democratic member of the Senate of Pennsylvania. He was elected to represent the 5th senatorial district on May 17, 2022, in a special election to replace incumbent Democrat John Sabatina. He was formerly a School District of Philadelphia grant compliance monitor.

== Early life and education ==
Dillon was born on January 15, 1979, in Northeast Philadelphia. He is a graduate of Holy Ghost Prep and the University of Notre Dame, where he played Division I basketball.

== Pennsylvania State Senate ==
In 2021, Democratic State Senator John Sabatina was elected as a judge on the Court of Common Pleas in Philadelphia and resigned his seat on December 31. On January 10, 2022, Democrats selected Dillon's older brother Shawn as their nominee. Shawn later withdrew from the race after facing a legal challenge due to missing candidate filing paperwork and was replaced on the ballot by Dillon, a School District of Philadelphia grant compliance monitor.

A special election was held on May 17; Dillon won with 54% of the vote. He was sworn in on June 7, 2022.

On September 24, 2024, Dillon was criticized for multiple posts containing racist and homophobic slurs uploaded to the X account of his basketball coaching business, Hoops 24–7, several years ago. The posts referred to a basketball player using a racial epithet and told a porn star to "come party with [them]."

He was defeated by Republican Joe Picozzi in 2024.
