= Alan Butkovitz =

American politician (born 1952)

Alan L. Butkovitz
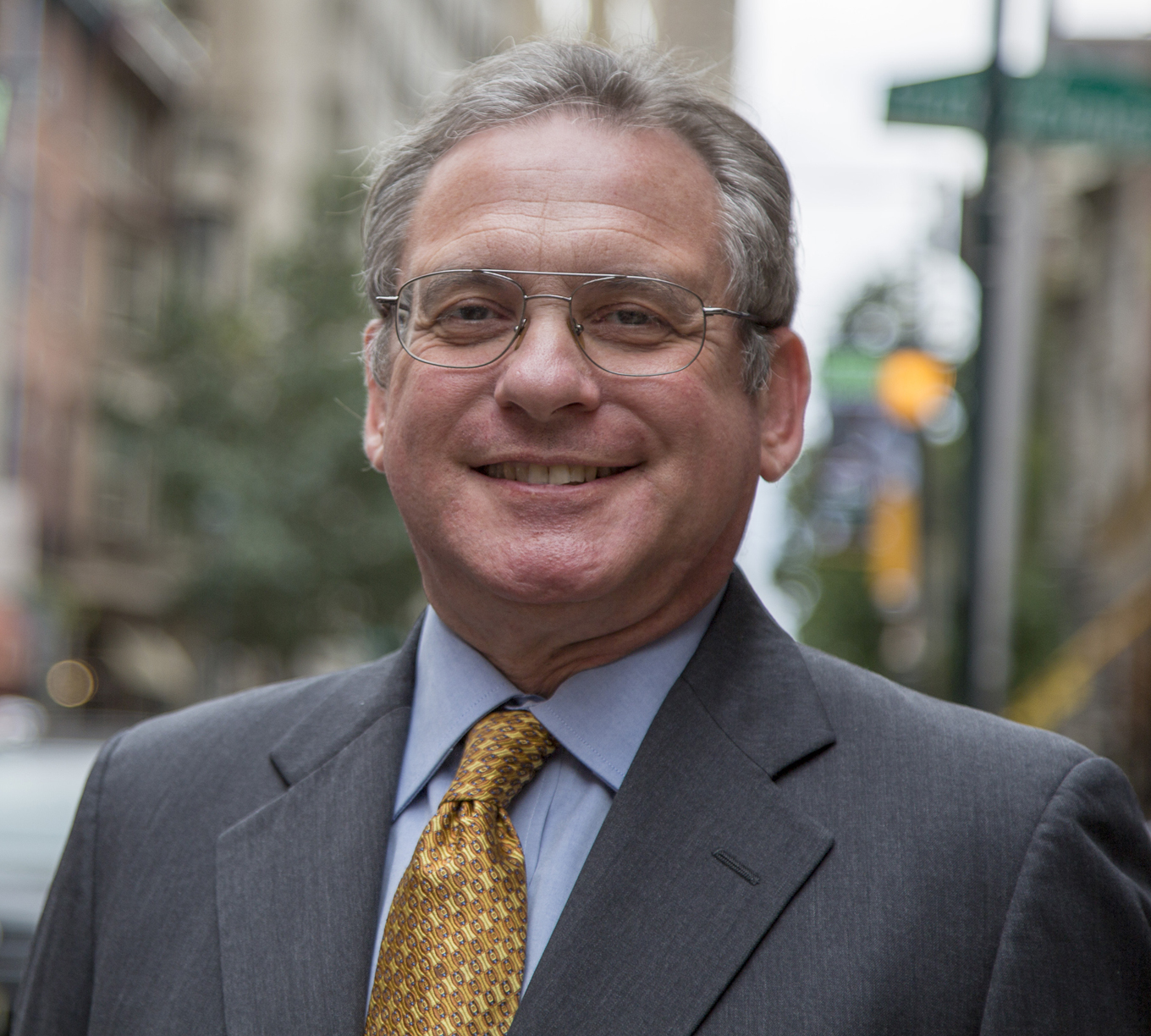

Philadelphia City Controller
- In office January 2, 2006 – January 1, 2018
- Preceded by: Jonathan Saidel
- Succeeded by: Rebecca Rhynhart

Member of the Pennsylvania House of Representatives from the 174th district
- In office January 1, 1991 – December 31, 2005
- Preceded by: Max Pievsky
- Succeeded by: John Sabatina

Personal details
- Born: April 15, 1952 (age 74) Philadelphia, Pennsylvania, U.S.
- Party: Democratic
- Spouse: Theresa
- Children: Rachel and Edward
- Education: Temple University and Temple Law School
- Website: http://www.philadelphiacontroller.org/ http://www.AlanButkovitz.com

Alan L. Butkovitz (born April 15, 1952) is an American politician from the Commonwealth of Pennsylvania. A member of the Democratic Party, he served as the City Controller of Philadelphia from 2006 to 2018. He was also a member of the Pennsylvania House of Representatives from 1991 to 2005. In 2023, he was a candidate in the 2024 Pennsylvania State Treasurer election but withdrew before the primary, citing ill health.

== Early life and education ==
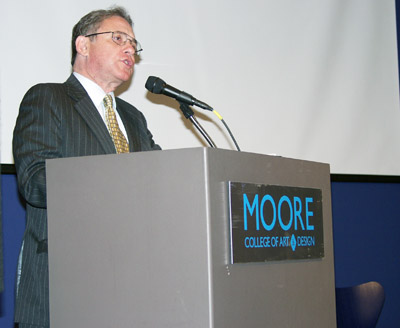
Alan Butkovitz at Moore College of Design

Butkovitz was born to a Jewish family and is a 1969 graduate of Overbrook High School in Philadelphia. He graduated from Temple University in 1973 and earned a J.D. from Temple University School of Law in 1976. In 1976, he ran for State Representative in the 170th State House district in the Democratic primary losing to Kenneth Hager 3910 to 2151 with Venita Nagel coming in third with 1185 votes( Pennsylvania Manual volume 103 page 684 )

== Early career ==
Butkovitz graduated from Temple University and earned a Juris Doctor degree from the Temple University School of Law.

Prior to holding elected office, Butkovitz was a Philadelphia attorney handling civil, criminal and environmental coverage cases. He was a partner of Gold, Butkovitz & Robbins P.C. In 1980, he won a first amendment case in U.S District Court Third Circuit that opened up the Mummers Parade to women, minorities, and new entrants.

== Pennsylvania General Assembly ==
Butkovitz served 15 years representing the 174th legislative district in the Pennsylvania House of Representatives. Butkovitz led a three-year bipartisan investigation into violence in Philadelphia public school that led to creating the Office of the Safe School Advocate, the first of its kind in the nation with the authority to fight for victims of school violence and monitor the School District of Philadelphia’s compliance with the Safe Schools Act.

During his first term, Butkovitz fought against his party's leadership to successfully repeal a tax requiring senior citizens to include social security, pensions, and veteran's benefits as taxable income. In November 2005, he was elected Philadelphia City Controller and resigned his legislative seat effective December 31, 2005.

== Philadelphia City Controller ==
Butkovitz won the 2005 Democratic Primary Election for Controller with 96% of the vote over John L Braxton. He went on to win the General Election, taking 72% of the vote in a three-way race.

During his 2009 re-election campaign, Butkovitz faced Braxton and Brett Mandel in the Democratic Primary and claimed victory with 42% of the vote (a 12% margin over 2nd place Braxton). He defeated Republican Al Schmidt in the General Election, taking 72% of the vote.

Butkovitz again faced two Democratic Primary opponents in 2013 - Mandel and Mark Zecca. In a primary where nearly $1 million was spent, Butkovitz was victorious and took 61% of the vote (a 30% margin over 2nd place Mandel). He defeated Republican Terry Tracy in the General Election by taking 82% of the vote.

Butkovitz ran for re-election in the 2017 primary against Rebecca Rhynhart. Butkovitz lost in an upset to reform minded Rhynhart, 58%-41%.

== Ward leader ==
Butkovitz is Ward Leader of the 54th Ward Democratic Executive Committee.

Butkovitz ran in the 2019 Democratic primary for mayor against incumbent Jim Kenney. He finished third in the race, taking 8.75%.
