= Martina White =

American politician (born 1988)

Martina A. White
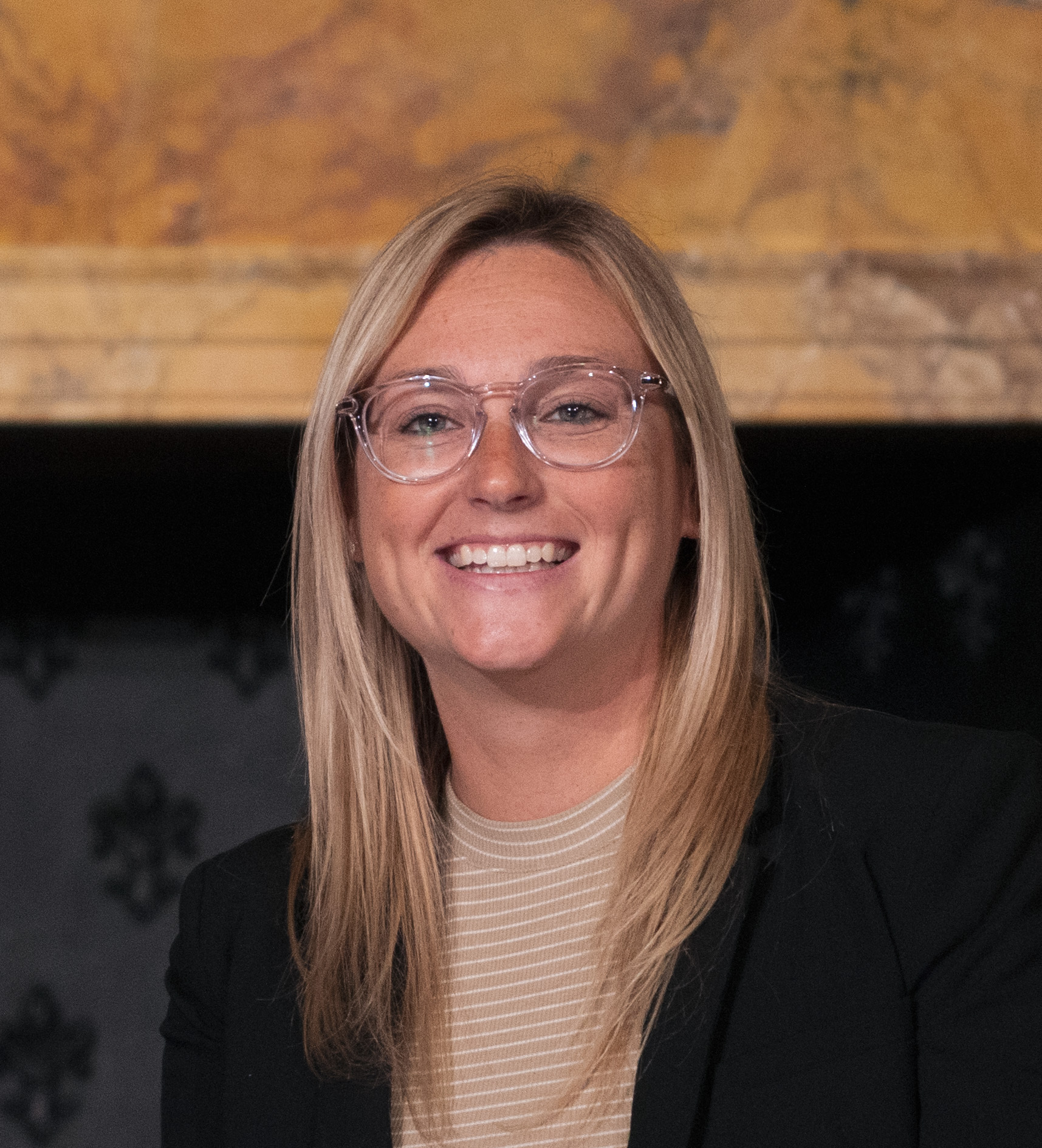
- White in 2022

Member of the Pennsylvania House of Representatives from the 170th district
- Incumbent
- Assumed office April 13, 2015
- Preceded by: Brendan Boyle

Chair of the Philadelphia Republican City Committee
- In office November 12, 2019 – June 8, 2022
- Preceded by: Mike Meehan
- Succeeded by: Vince Fenerty

Personal details
- Born: July 7, 1988 (age 38) Philadelphia, Pennsylvania, U.S.
- Party: Republican
- Education: Elizabethtown College
- Occupation: Financial Advisor
- Website: www.repwhite.com

Martina A. White (born July 7, 1988) is an American politician. A Republican, she is a member of the Pennsylvania House of Representatives for the 170th district, being first elected in 2015.

== Personal life ==
The first member of her immediate family to graduate from college, White received her Bachelor of Science degree in Business Administration from Elizabethtown College in 2010. While in school there, she played field hockey.

White resides in the Parkwood area of Northeast Philadelphia.

== Career ==
A financial advisor and lifelong resident of Northeast Philadelphia, White was first elected on March 24, 2015, in a special election to fill an open seat in the 170th District. She became the first new Republican elected in Philadelphia in 25 years, and for two years was the only elected Republican representing a significant portion of Philadelphia above the city-county level.

The 170th District includes the neighborhoods of Bustleton, Millbrook, Parkwood and Somerton.

White currently serves as the majority caucus secretary. She is also a member of the Rules Committee and the Committee on Committees.

On November 12, 2019, White was elected as chair of the Philadelphia Republican City Committee. She held this position until June 2022.

== Electoral history ==
2015 Pennsylvania State Representative special election for the 170th district
Party	Candidate	Votes	%	±%
Republican	Martina White	3,565	55.83%	+55.83
Democratic	Sarah Del Ricci	2,820	44.17%	−55.83
Total votes		6,385	100.0%	N/A
Republican gain from Democratic				

2016 Pennsylvania State Representative election for the 170th district, Republican primary
Party	Candidate	Votes	%
Republican	Martina White (incumbent)	4,105	100%
Total votes		4,105	100%

2016 Pennsylvania State Representative election for the 170th district
Party	Candidate	Votes	%	±%
Republican	Martina White (incumbent)	14,265	53.92%	−1.91
Democratic	Matthew Darragh	12,192	46.08%	+1.91
Total votes		26,457	100%	N/A
Republican hold				

2018 Pennsylvania State Representative election for the 170th district, Republican primary
Party	Candidate	Votes	%
Republican	Martina White (incumbent)	1,778	100%
Total votes		1,778	100%

2018 Pennsylvania State Representative election for the 170th district
Party	Candidate	Votes	%	±%
Republican	Martina White (incumbent)	11,754	57.61%	+3.69
Democratic	Michael Doyle Jr.	8,650	42.39%	−3.69
Total votes		20,404	100%	N/A
Republican hold				

2020 Pennsylvania State Representative election for the 170th district, Republican primary
Party	Candidate	Votes	%
Republican	Martina White (incumbent)	3,510	100%
Total votes		3,510	100%

2020 Pennsylvania State Representative election for the 170th district
Party	Candidate	Votes	%	±%
Republican	Martina White (incumbent)	17,693	60.43%	+2.82
Democratic	Michael Doyle Jr.	11,586	39.57%	−2.82
Total votes		29,279	100%	N/A
Republican hold				
