= 1982 Pennsylvania gubernatorial election =

- November 2, 1982
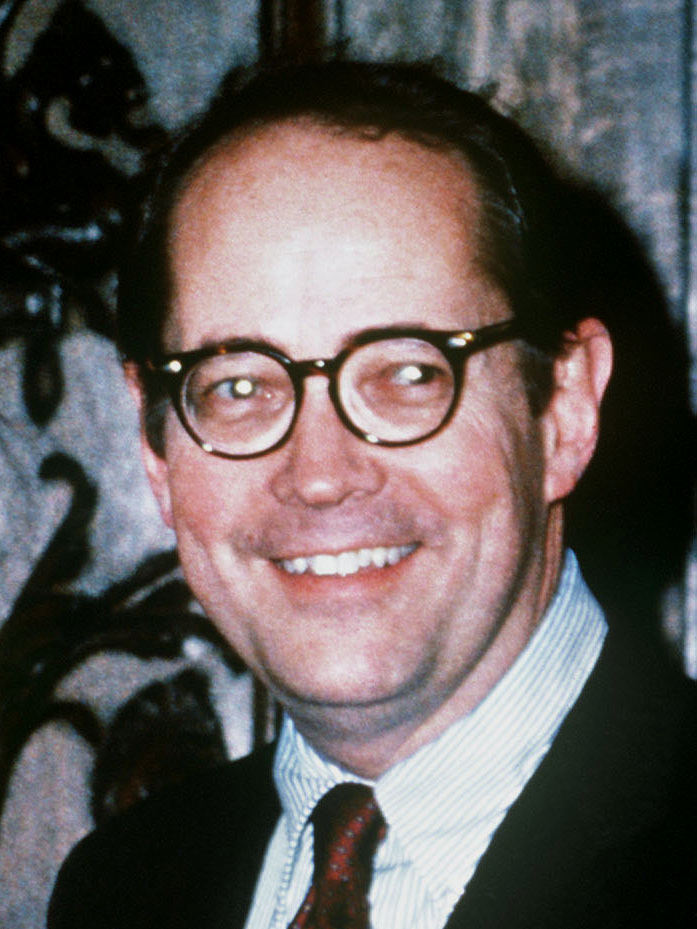

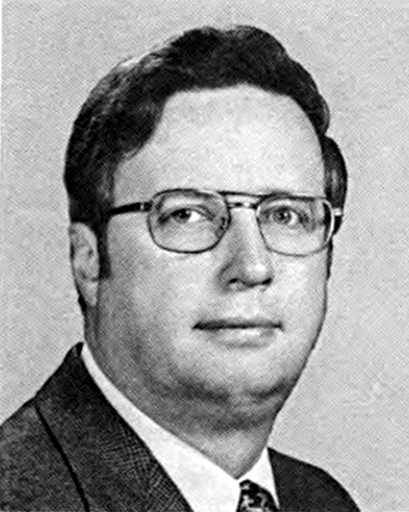
| Nominee | Dick Thornburgh | Allen Ertel |
| Party | Republican | Democratic |
| Running mate | Bill Scranton III | James Lloyd |
| Popular vote | 1,872,784 | 1,772,353 |
| Percentage | 50.84% | 48.11% |
- County results Thornburgh: 40–50% 50–60% 60–70% 70–80% Ertel: 50–60% 60–70%
Governor before election
Dick Thornburgh
Republican
Elected Governor
Dick Thornburgh
Republican

The 1982 Pennsylvania gubernatorial election was held on November 2, 1982, between incumbent Republican Dick Thornburgh and Democratic U.S. Congressman Allen E. Ertel. Thornburgh was a popular incumbent, who largely was the favorite throughout the race. However, owing to a nationwide recession which hit the state particularly hard, and a backlash to Reaganomics, the final result ended up becoming much closer than what was initially anticipated. As of 2026, this is the most recent election where a Republican was elected governor in Pennsylvania while a Republican was also president.

== Republican primary ==
Incumbent Governor Dick Thornburgh ran unopposed for the Republican nomination.

== Democratic primary ==
=== Candidates ===
- Steve Douglas, Philadelphia political consultant
- Allen Ertel, U.S. representative from Pennsylvania's 17th congressional district (1977–present), from Williamsport
- Eugene Knox, Northumberland County dentist
- Earl McDowell, Fayette County businessman

=== Results ===
Democratic primary results Ertel: 30%–40%; 40%–50%; 50%–60%; 60%–70%; 70%–80%; 80%–90%; 90%–100%; McDowell: 40%–50%

Pennsylvania gubernatorial election, 1986
| Party | Candidate | Votes | % |
|---|---|---|---|
| Democratic | Allen Ertel | 436,251 | 57.64 |
| Democratic | Steve Douglas | 143,762 | 19.00 |
| Democratic | Earl McDowell | 116,880 | 15.44 |
| Democratic | Eugene Knox | 59,925 | 7.92 |
| Total votes | | 756,818 | 100.00 |

== General election ==
=== Campaign ===
Thornburgh, who maintained high approval ratings during his first term, was initially considered a shoo-in for reelection. As other governors struggled amidst a nationwide Democratic election cycle, Thornburgh maintained high approval ratings, in part due to his response to crises such as the Three Mile Island accident. Furthermore, the Democrats' top candidate, Philadelphia District Attorney (and future governor) Ed Rendell, declined to seek the nomination leaving U.S. Congressman Allen Ertel as the party's standard bearer. Ertel struggled early with fundraising and, because of his residence in heavily Republican Central Pennsylvania, lacked a base among the state's strongest Democratic constituents: urban voters and organized labor. However, a serious recession affected the nation, and was particularly felt in the state. One of the hardest hit regions was then traditionally Democratic western Pennsylvania, which saw counties with unemployment rates as high as 20%. Ertel campaigned hard against the economic policies of President Ronald Reagan, and against Thornburgh's cold disposition towards those affected by the economic downturn; Thornburgh was forced to distance himself from Reagan as support for Reaganomics waned.

The state's political environment strongly favored Ertel not only because of national issues, but because the governmental cuts undertaken by Thornburgh during his term as governor had caused him to lose the support of several traditionally Democratic-leaning organizations that had once stood by his side, such as the NAACP and the state's teachers' union. Furthermore, Thornburgh had hurt his standing among African American leaders, as a result of the cuts he had made, which hit the state's Black population hardest. However, Ertel ran a relatively mediocre campaign and hurt his chances with several gaffes, such as accusing the governor of exploiting his disabled son's condition for political gain, and most significantly, refusing to release the previous 7 years his income taxes to avoid being "whipsawed" by charities. For his part, Thornburgh tried to ignore Ertel to avoid granting his campaign legitimacy, and mostly focused on his record for the previous 4 years. In spite of the Democratic opponent, Thornburgh generally polled ahead by significant margins throughout the campaign

=== Results ===
In the end, Thornburgh won in his bid for a second term, but by a much closer margin than pundits had predicted. He underperformed Senator John Heinz on the same ballot by a margin of 9 points. Thornburgh also saw his performance with African American voters fall from 50% in 1978 to just 18% this time around and performed much worse in Philadelphia, though he improved in the suburbs. Ertel, being from Central Pennsylvania managed to perform quite well for a Democrat in the area, keeping the margins close, while also flipping counties that Thornburgh won 4 years prior. However, Ertel's strength in the region was not enough to counter Thornburgh's strength in the Lehigh Valley and in Western Pennsylvania, where Thornburgh improved his margin in comparison to his previous performance against former Mayor of Pittsburgh Pete Flaherty.

Pennsylvania gubernatorial election, 1982
| Party | Candidate | Running mate | Votes | Percentage |
|---|---|---|---|---|
| Republican | Dick Thornburgh (incumbent) | Bill Scranton III (incumbent) | 1,872,784 | 50.84% |
| Democratic | Allen Ertel | James Lloyd | 1,772,353 | 48.11% |
| Socialist Workers | Mark Zola | Wilson Osteen, Jr. | 15,495 | 0.42% |
| Consumer | Lee Frissell | Judith Faulkner | 13,101 | 0.36% |
| Libertarian | Richard Fuerle | David Walter | 10,252 | 0.28% |
| Totals | | | 3,683,985 | 100.00% |
| Voter turnout (Voting age population) | | | | 64.60% |
