= Allen E. Ertel =

American lawyer and politician (1937–2015)

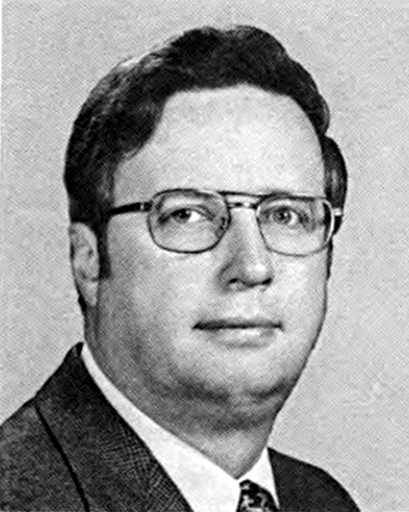

Member of the U.S. House of Representatives from Pennsylvania's 17th district
- In office January 3, 1977 – January 3, 1983
- Preceded by: Herman Schneebeli
- Succeeded by: George Gekas

District Attorney of Lycoming County
- In office 1967–1977
- Preceded by: Henry G. Hager
- Succeeded by: William Kieser

Personal details
- Born: Allen Edward Ertel; November 7, 1937 Williamsport, Pennsylvania, U.S.
- Died: November 19, 2015 (aged 78) Williamsport, Pennsylvania, U.S.
- Party: Democratic
- Spouse: Catherine Ertel
- Children: 2
- Education: Dartmouth College (AB), (MS), (MBA); Yale Law School (LLB)

Allen Edward Ertel (November 7, 1937 – November 19, 2015) was an American lawyer and politician who served three terms as a Democratic member of the U.S. House of Representatives for Pennsylvania's 17th congressional district from 1977 to 1983.

== Early life and military service ==
Allen Ertel was born in Williamsport, Pennsylvania. He graduated with an AB from Dartmouth College in 1958, an MS from the Thayer School of Engineering and MBA from the Tuck School of Business in 1959, and a LL.B. Yale Law School in 1965.

He served in the United States Navy from 1959 to 1962.

== Career ==
He clerked for Chief Judge Caleb Wright of the Federal District Court of Delaware from 1965 to 1966, and was the Lycoming County district attorney from 1967 to 1977. He was a delegate to Democratic National Convention in 1972.

Ertel was elected in 1976 as a Democrat to the 95th, 96th, and 97th Congresses. He was not a candidate for reelection in 1982.

== Later career ==
Rather than seek reelection to his House seat in 1982, Ertel was an unsuccessful candidate for Governor of Pennsylvania. After his unsuccessful run for governor, he unsuccessfully sought the office of Pennsylvania Attorney General in 1984, before returning to the practice of law in Williamsport.

After returning to private law practice, Ertel later served as chairman of Firetree, Ltd., a nonprofit organization providing addiction treatment and reentry services to individuals transitioning from the criminal justice system.

Ertel was active in his local community, holding membership in St. Luke Evangelical Lutheran Church. He also participated in the Warrensville area Lions Club, a civic organization focused on community service and volunteer initiatives.

== Death ==
Ertel died on November 19, 2015, in Williamsport, Pennsylvania, after suddenly collapsing, aged 78. He was survived by his wife Catherine and their two children.

A memorial service was held at St. Luke Evangelical Lutheran Church in Williamsport on November 28, 2015.

U.S. House of Representatives
Preceded by Herman Schneebeli	Member of the U.S. House of Representatives from Pennsylvania's 17th congressional district 1977–1983	Succeeded by George Gekas
Party political offices
Preceded by Pete Flaherty	Democratic nominee for Governor of Pennsylvania; 1982	Succeeded by Bob Casey
Preceded by Michael O'Pake	Democratic nominee for Attorney General of Pennsylvania; 1984	Succeeded by Edward Mezvinsky
