= Pennsylvania House of Representatives, District 170 =

American legislative district

Pennsylvania's 170th State House of Representatives district
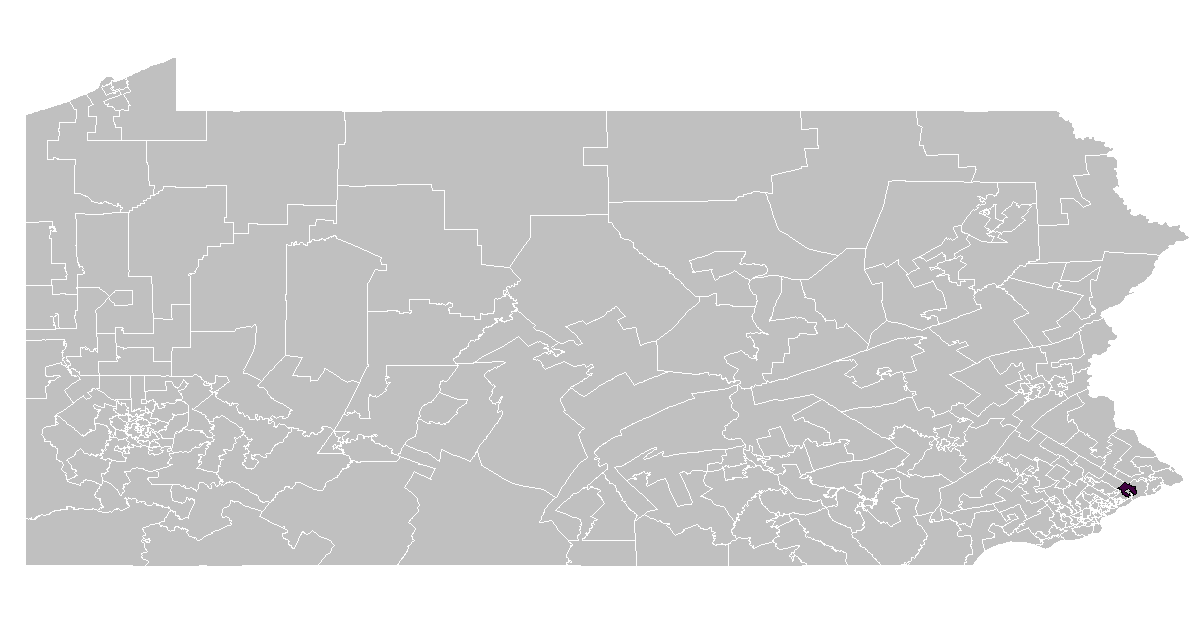
Representative
| Martina White; R–Philadelphia |

The 170th Pennsylvania House of Representatives District is located in Philadelphia County and includes the following areas:

- Ward 58 [PART, Divisions 01, 02, 03, 04, 05, 06, 07, 08, 12, 14, 15, 18, 20, 21, 22, 23, 24, 25, 27, 29, 30, 31, 32, 33, 34, 35, 36, 37, 38, 39, 40, 41, 42, 43 and 44]
- Ward 66 [PART, Divisions 01, 03, 04, 05, 06, 08, 09, 10, 12, 13, 14, 15, 16, 18, 20, 22, 23, 31, 33, 34, 38, 39, 40 and 41]

== Special Election ==
A Special Election for the 170th House District was ordered for Tuesday, March 24, 2015.

Republican candidate Martina White was nominated by Republican ward leaders in the district, and went on to win the special election, with a 14% margin over Democrat Sarah Del Ricci.

In the 2026 midterm elections, Republican Martina White was re-elected by 15 points even with Democrat Governor Josh Shapiro carrying the same district by 23 points.

== Representatives ==
| Representative | Party | Years | District home | Note |
Prior to 1969, seats were apportioned by county.
| Tom Gola | Republican | 1969 – 1970 | Philadelphia | |
| Alvin Katz | Republican | 1971 – 1972 | Philadelphia | |
| Frank A. Salvatore | Republican | 1973 – 1984 | Philadelphia | Elected to the State Senate |
| George T. Kenney | Republican | 1985 – 2008 | Philadelphia | Retired |
| Brendan Boyle | Democrat | 2009 – 2015 | Philadelphia | Elected to the US House of Representatives. |
| Martina White | Republican | 2015 – | Philadelphia | Elected in special election |
