= Ultra-Millionaire Tax Act of 2021 =

Proposed bill in the United States

The Ultra-Millionaire Tax Act of 2021 is a proposed bill in the United States Congress, which would impose a tax on the wealth of the top 0.05% of Americans. The act was proposed and introduced by Senator Elizabeth Warren (D-Mass), Representative Pramila Jayapal, and Representative Brendan Boyle. The bill mandates that any household or trust with any net worth between $50 million to $1 billion will be taxed 2% of their net worth annually and any household or trust surpassing $1 billion will have a surtax of 1% (3% in total). Senator Warren expects the bill to raise $3 trillion in revenue over the next 10 years.

== Propositions ==
- A $100 billion investment to rebuild and expand the Internal Revenue Service, ensuring that the agency has the tools it needs to recruit and train new employees, modernize IT processes, and introduce new asset assessment, monitoring, and compliance standards.
- For taxpayers subject to the Ultra-Millionaire Tax, a minimum audit rate of 30% is needed.
- A 40% "exit tax" on any U.S. resident with a net worth surpassing $50 million who renounces their citizenship to avoid paying their share of taxes.
- The IRS will be able to tighten and extend existing valuation laws by using new methods to assess the value of difficult-to-value properties.
- Systematic third-party reporting based on current tax information sharing arrangements enacted following the Foreign Account Tax Compliance Act, as well as penalties for underpayment.

In the first version, the tax applies to all worldwide property of citizens of the United States and to property of non-citizens situated in the United States. Tax is imposed on the value of property during the last day of a calendar year. Debts are deducted from property value. Personal property of value under $50,000 is not considered.

Married couples are treated as one applicable taxpayer for the purposes of this tax. Property given to the taxpayer's relatives under the age of 18 are treated as property of the taxpayer until the child attains the age of 18. When transferring property between trusts, the trusts start to be treated as a single taxpayer as well.

Individual who die have their wealth taxed with the value of property to the date of death.

== Arguments for the tax ==
Taxing wealth of the richest is a popular thought among many political groups. The main reason is that it can raise trillions of dollars while only having to tax very few people. But the bill could also lead to tax rates being fairer and it could reduce the wealth gap.

=== Unfair tax rates ===
Warren's argumentation is the following.

"The ultra-rich and powerful have rigged the rules in their favor so much that the top 0.1% pay a lower effective tax rate than the bottom 99%, and billionaire wealth is 40% higher than before the COVID crisis began. A wealth tax is popular among voters on both sides for good reason: because they understand the system is rigged to benefit the wealthy and large corporations. As Congress develops additional plans to help our economy, the wealth tax should be at the top of the list to help pay for these plans because of the huge amounts of revenue it would generate."

Upon including the cost of private health insurance, the wealthiest Americans currently pay an effective income tax rate of about 23% as opposed to almost 40% for middle class Americans. Warren's proposals would turn it into the richest paying significantly higher rates. If calculating the effective tax rate as a percentage of net worth, the difference or current tax rates gets even bigger. The bottom 99% of Americans pay about 7.2% of their net worth every year in taxes, per Warren. The top 0.1%, by contrast, pay about 3.2%. Being wealthy means having more opportunities to avoid or lower taxes since investment income is taxed at a lower rate than wage income. Because the payment is bound to citizenship and property, the bill can be a good way to tax foreign or unsold wealth. It could limit tax avoidance options.

=== Wealth gap ===
The tax aims to reduce the wealth gap. “The Ultra-Millionaire Tax Act would level the playing field and narrow the racial wealth gap by asking the wealthiest 100,000 households in America, or the top 0.05%, to pay their fair share,” Warren stated. "The hyper concentration of wealth among a tiny number of multimillionaires and billionaires is a crisis for American capitalism and the American Dream. Wealth inequality is at its highest level since the Gilded Age. The wealth share of the richest 0.1% has nearly tripled since the late 1970s," said Congressman Boyle.

Many people believe that widening the wealth gap is a natural characteristic of capitalism. In 2014, French economist Thomas Piketty warned in his book “Capital in the Twenty-First Century” that if the already rich were able to accumulate wealth faster than economies were able to grow, inequality would skyrocket in the coming decades, potentially destabilizing societies in the process. He proposes a system of progressive wealth taxes to avoid the negative consequences. However, his theory has been challenged by other economists.

The Ultra-Millionaire Tax Act is co-sponsored by Senators Bernie Sanders (I-Vt.), Sheldon Whitehouse (D-R.I.), Jeff Merkley (D-Ore.), Kirsten Gillibrand (D-N.Y.), Brian Schatz (D-Hawaii), Edward J. Markey (D-Mass.), Mazie Hirono (D-Hawaii.). It is also endorsed by many organisations such as Action Center on Race and the Economy, AFL-CIO, American Federation of State, County and Municipal Employees (AFSCME), Americans for Financial Reform, Americans for Tax Fairness and other.

== Criticism ==
Although the proposal has gained support, it also faces criticism. This includes implementation problems as well as economic arguments and bad historic experience.

=== Implementation ===
Although the proposal has gained support, it might be difficult to implement. First, valuating assets of wealthy is often complicated, especially for illiquid assets. It can be seen from the proposition itself that enforcing the tax will be expensive, with a significant part of the revenue having to be used for administration and auditing, as well as the fact that millionaires might still find loopholes to lower or avoid their payment. U.S. Treasury Secretary Janet Yellen stated in an interview that a wealth tax is off the table, as it's "something that has very difficult implementation problems." She added that "a wealth tax has been discussed," but it's not favored by President Joe Biden.

=== The Constitution ===
A wealth tax could be unconstitutional in the United States. Article I of the United States Constitution, Section 9, bars any "capitation, or other direct, tax". In 1895, the Supreme Court ruled that a federal income tax was therefore unconstitutional. The 16th Amendment made income tax constitutional, but it did not cover a wealth tax.

=== Economic arguments ===
The tax can force millionaires to sell their assets or limit investment, which can be harmful for the economy. It can discourage foreign investors to invest to United States since their property located in the U. S. will also get taxed. A 2020 Tax Foundation analysis of wealth tax proposals of Warren and Sanders found they would reduce U.S. economic output by 0.37% and 0.43%, respectively, over the long term. That means that even though the wealth gap might be reduced by wealth taxes, the standard of living might be lowered for everyone, especially if the tax gets higher or if it is imposed on more people in the future.

Some could also argue that the millionaires will leave the U. S. However, since "exit tax" is proposed, this is not very probable. Also, interstate migration is almost as twice as common among the middle class than among the rich. So millionaires will likely want to stay. The bill is also immune to capital transition, so capital flight is also improbable.

=== Other arguments ===
A wealth tax may not be the only way to solve the issues above. For example, different effective tax rates for the rich can be changed by adjusting current tax rates. Or biflation created by expansionary monetary policy might be a reason for wealth-gap increase during the COVID-19 crisis and avoiding it could be just as effective.

=== Historic experience with wealth taxes ===
In many European countries, wealth taxes were a failure. In 2018, president Emmanuel Macron cancelled France's wealth tax, which had caused capital flight, brain drain, loss of jobs, a net loss in tax revenue.

The rate was charged on individuals with a net worth over €1.3m (£1.14m), with the rate beginning from 0.5% and rising to 1.5% on assets over €10m. However, the revenue was not as high as expected. In 2015, a total of 343,000 households paid €5.22bn, an average of about €15,200 per household. It accounted for less than 2% of France's tax receipts.

Twelve European countries had a wealth tax in 1990. Currently, there are only three—Norway, Spain and Switzerland—with critics pointing to difficulty of administration, burden on those with many illiquid assets, discouraged investment, and less-than-promised revenue. Nonetheless, Warren argues her proposal differs from those ones already implemented, and has also proposed a 40% "exit tax".
