= John Sabatina =

American politician

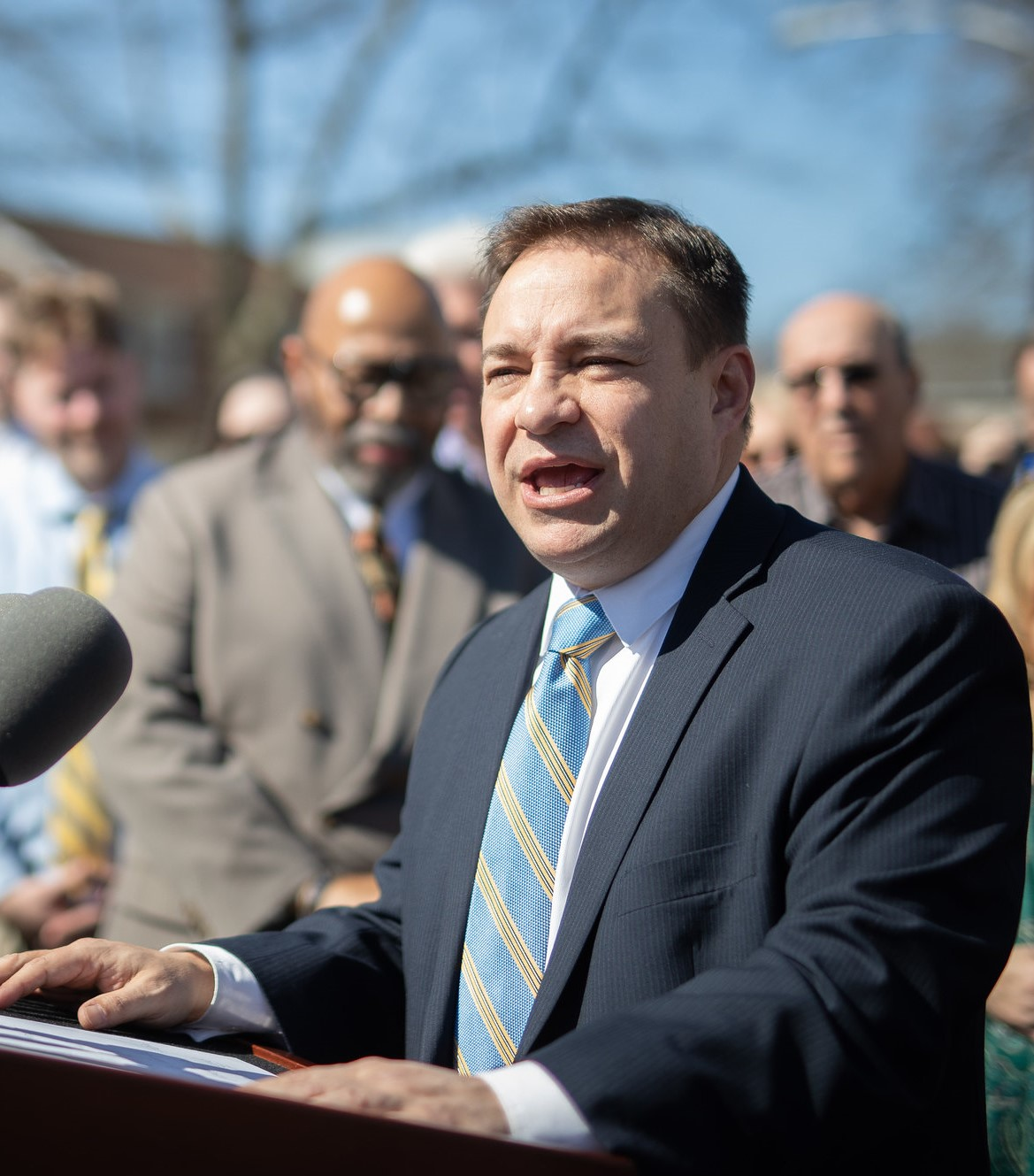
- Sabatina in 2020

Member of the Pennsylvania Senate from the 5th district
- In office June 9, 2015 – December 31, 2021
- Preceded by: Mike Stack
- Succeeded by: Jimmy Dillon

Member of the Pennsylvania House of Representatives from the 174th district
- In office April 3, 2006 – June 9, 2015
- Preceded by: Alan Butkovitz
- Succeeded by: Ed Neilson

Personal details
- Born: October 6, 1970 (age 56) Abington Township, Montgomery County, Pennsylvania, U.S.
- Party: Democratic
- Spouse: Eileen
- Children: 2
- Education: Father Judge High School; West Chester University (BS); Widener University (JD)

John Patrick Sabatina Jr. is an American politician and judge currently serving on the Philadelphia Court of Common Pleas. From 2006 to 2015, Sabatina served as a Pennsylvania state representative from the 174th district. He resigned from the state house after being elected to serve as Pennsylvania State Senator from the 5th district following the resignation of State Senator Mike Stack after he was elected Lieutenant Governor of Pennsylvania. Sabatina resigned as a state senator in 2021 after being elected to the Philadelphia Court of Common Pleas.

== Early life and education ==
Sabatina was born on October 6, 1970, in Abington Township, Pennsylvania, the son of John and Judith Sabatina. He graduated from Father Judge High School in 1988. In 1994, Sabatina earned a Bachelor of Sciences degree in marketing from West Chester University and later earned a Juris Doctor degree from Widener University Delaware Law School in 1997.

== Career ==
Prior to being elected to the Pennsylvania House of Representatives, Sabatina served as assistant district attorney of Philadelphia.

=== Pennsylvania House of Representatives ===
Sabatina was elected to represent the 174th district in the Pennsylvania House of Representatives on March 14, 2006, in a special election. He was sworn in on April 3, 2006, and was later reelected to serve five more consecutive terms. In 2011, Sabatina was appointed to the Pennsylvania Commission on Sentencing on which he served until 2014.

=== Pennsylvania State Senate ===
Sabatina resigned from the state House on June 9, 2015, after being elected to fill the 5th state senate district seat vacated by Mike Stack who had been elected Lieutenant Governor of Pennsylvania. During his tenure, Sabatina served as minority chair on Pennsylvania Senate Transportation Committee. He also served on the Aging and Youth; Communications and Technology; Community, Economic and Recreational Development; and Senate Judiciary Committees. Sabatina resigned from the state senate on December 31, 2021, after being elected to the Philadelphia Court of Common Pleas the previous month.

=== Philadelphia Court of Common Pleas ===
Sabatina has been serving as a judge on the Philadelphia Court of Common Pleas since 2022.

== Personal life ==
In the 2023 Philadelphia municipal election, Sabatina Jr's father, John Sabatina Sr., was elected Register of Wills, after defeating incumbent Democrat Tracey Gordon in the primary.
