= Pennsylvania's 5th Senate district =

American legislative district

Pennsylvania's 5th State Senate district
Senator
Joe Picozzi; R–Philadelphia
- Population (2021): 267,205

Pennsylvania State Senate District 5 includes parts of Philadelphia County. It is currently represented by Republican Joe Picozzi.

== District profile ==
The district includes the following areas:

Philadelphia County:

- Ward 41
- Ward 56
- Ward 57
- Ward 58
- Ward 63
- Ward 64
- Ward 65
- Ward 66

== Senators ==
Representative	Party	Years	District home	Note
Peter Frailey	Democratic-Republican	1811 – 1819		
Charles Shoemaker, Jr.	Democratic-Republican	1813 – 1819		
Marks John Biddle	Federalist	1815 – 1817		
Ely Kitchin	Republican	1825 – 1826		
William H. Rowland	Democratic	1827 – 1828		
Mathias Morris	Anti-Jacksonian, Whig	1829 – 1831		U.S. Representative for Pennsylvania's 6th congressional district from 1835 to 1839
John Miller	Democratic	1837 – 1839		
Samuel Fegeley	Democratic	1841 – 1845		
John Potteiger	Democratic	1847 – 1848		
William Muhlenberg Hiester	Democratic	1853 – 1855		
John Clarkson Evans	Democratic	1855 – 1857		
Joseph Laubach	Democratic	1857 – 1858		Pennsylvania State Representative for the 9th district from 1855 to 1856
Jeremiah Schindel	Democratic	1859 – 1860		
George W. Stein	Democratic	1861 – 1863		
Wilmer Worthington	Republican	1863 – 1869		
Horace Royer	Republican	1865 – 1867		
Charles Henderson Stinson	Republican	1867 – 1869		
Hugh Jones Brooke	Whig	1871 – 1872		Pennsylvania State Senator for the 4th district from 1849 to 1852
William B. Waddell	Republican	1873 – 1874		
Thomas Valentine Cooper	Republican	1873 – 1874		Pennsylvania State Representative for Delaware County from 1870 to 1871, 1872 to 1873 and 1901 to 1909. Pennsylvania State Senator for the 9th district from 1875 to 1888.
John Edgar Reyburn	Republican	1877 – 1883		Pennsylvania State Representative in 1871 and from 1874 to 1876. U.S. Representative for Pennsylvania's 4th district from 1890 to 1897 and Pennsylvania's 2nd district from 1906 to 1907.
Charles A. Porter	Republican	1891 – 1895		
Charles Lincoln Brown	Republican	1897 – 1900		First two of four terms as Pennsylvania State Senator
William H. Berkelbach	Republican	1901 – 1903		
Charles Lincoln Brown	Republican	1905 – 1907		Second two of four terms as Pennsylvania State Senator
Richard V. Farley	Democratic	1913 – 1915		
David Martin	Republican	1917 – 1920		Pennsylvania State Senator for the 8th district from 1899 to 1902
Max Aron	Republican	1921 – 1935		
Israel Stiefel	Democratic	1937 – 1963		
Herbert J. McGlinchey	Democratic	1965 – 1972		U.S. Representative for Pennsylvania's 6th district from 1945 to 1947
Charles F. Dougherty	Republican	1973 – 1979		Resigned January 15, 1979. U.S. Representative for Pennsylvania's 4th district from 1979 to 1983.
James R. Lloyd, Jr.	Democratic	1979 – 1984		Elected April 23, 1979, to fill vacancy
Frank A. Salvatore	Republican	1985 – 2000		Pennsylvania State Representative for the 170th district from 1973 to 1984.
Michael J. Stack III	Democratic	2001 – 2015		33rd Lieutenant Governor of Pennsylvania from 2015 to 2019
John P. Sabatina Jr.	Democratic	2015 – 2021		Pennsylvania State Representative for the 174th district from 2006 to 2015
Jimmy Dillon	Democratic	2022 – 2025		
Joe Picozzi	Republican	2025 –		
