= Brendan Boyle =

American politician (born 1977)

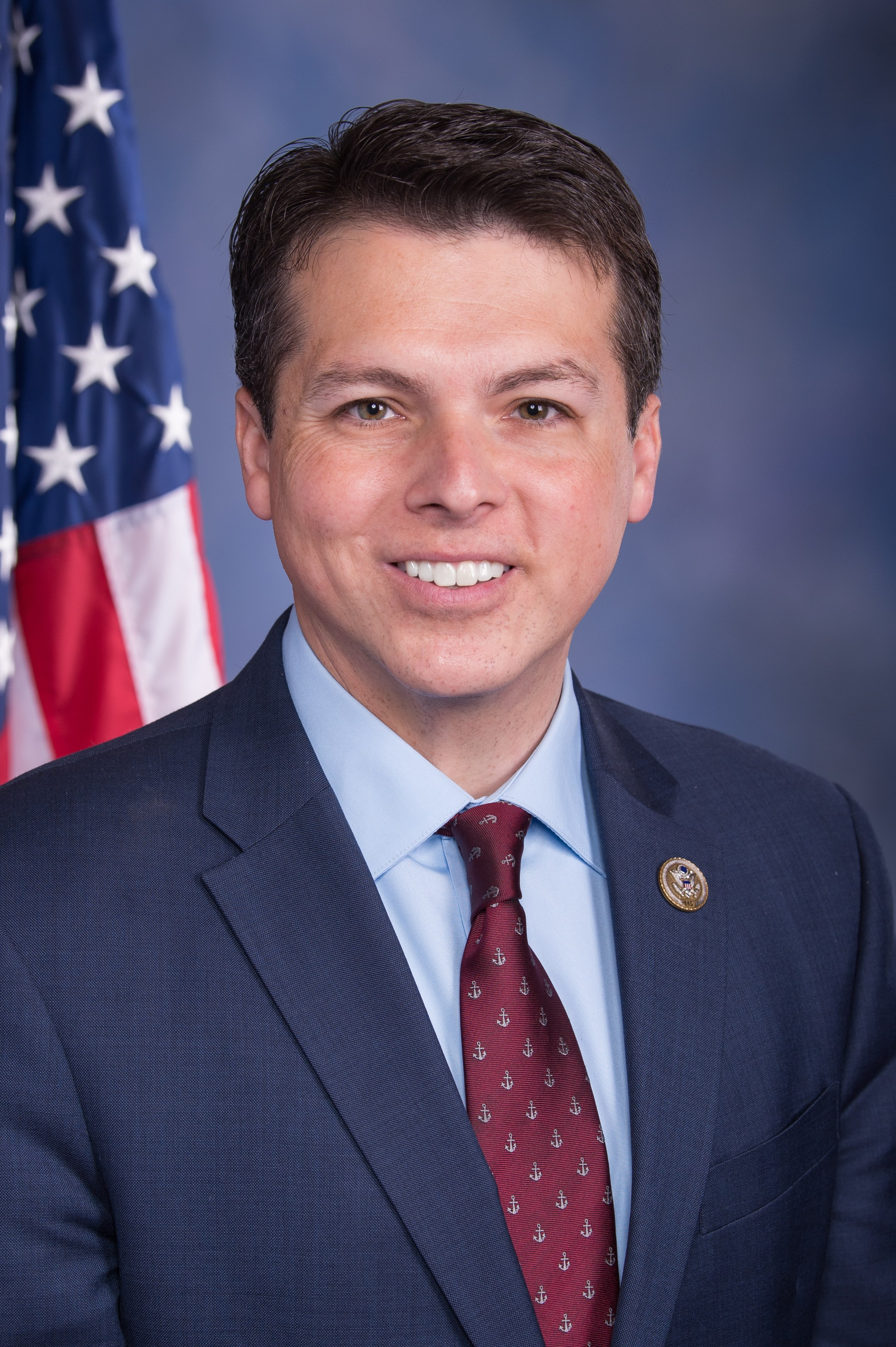
- Official portrait, 2018

Ranking Member of the House Budget Committee
- Incumbent
- Assumed office January 3, 2023
- Preceded by: Jason Smith

Member of the U.S. House of Representatives from Pennsylvania
- Incumbent
- Assumed office January 3, 2015
- Preceded by: Allyson Schwartz (13th district); Bob Brady (2nd district, redistricted)
- Constituency: 13th district (2015–2019); 2nd district (2019–present)

Member of the Pennsylvania House of Representatives from the 170th district
- In office January 6, 2009 – January 3, 2015
- Preceded by: George T. Kenney
- Succeeded by: Martina White

Personal details
- Born: Brendan Francis Boyle; February 6, 1977 (age 49) Philadelphia, Pennsylvania, U.S.
- Party: Democratic
- Spouse: Jennifer Boyle
- Children: 1
- Relatives: Kevin J. Boyle (brother)
- Education: University of Notre Dame (BA); Harvard University (MPP)
- Website: House website Campaign website
- Boyle's voice Boyle criticizing Nabisco outsourcing jobs to Mexico. Recorded January 15, 2019

Brendan Francis Boyle (born February 6, 1977) is an American politician serving as a Democratic Party member of the United States House of Representatives since 2015. He represents a district in the Philadelphia area.

From 2009 to 2015 served in the Pennsylvania House of Representatives representing Pennsylvania House of Representatives, District 170. From 2015 to 2019 he represented Pennsylvania's 13th congressional district, serving much of Northeast Philadelphia and most of suburban Montgomery County, Pennsylvania. Since 2019 he has represented Pennsylvania's 2nd congressional district, which is entirely within the City of Philadelphia, including all of Northeast Philadelphia and portions of North Philadelphia and Center City Philadelphia, largely east of Broad Street.

Since January 2023, he has been the ranking minority member of the United States House Committee on the Budget. In this position, Boyle led House Democratic opposition to the health care and nutrition assistance funding cuts in the Trump administration’s One Big Beautiful Bill Act (OBBBA). He introduced the Hands Off Medicaid and SNAP Act of 2025 to block these cuts.

== Early life and education ==
Brendan Boyle is the elder of two sons. His father, Francis (Frank), is an Irish immigrant who came to the United States in 1970 from Glencolmcille, a district of County Donegal, and works as a janitor for the Southeastern Pennsylvania Transportation Authority (SEPTA). His late mother, Eileen, was the child of Irish immigrants from County Sligo; she worked as a Philadelphia School District crossing guard for over 20 years.

Boyle was born and raised in Philadelphia's Olney neighborhood. He attended Cardinal Dougherty High School before receiving an academic scholarship to the University of Notre Dame, where he earned a Bachelor of Arts degree in 1999, completing the Hesburgh Program in Public Service.

After working for several years as a consultant with the United States Department of Defense, including Naval Sea Systems Command, he attended graduate school at Harvard Kennedy School, where he earned a Master of Public Policy.

== Pennsylvania House of Representatives (2009–2015) ==
=== Elections ===
In 2008, Boyle defeated Republican Matthew Taubenberger, son of 2007 mayoral candidate Al Taubenberger, by a margin of 15,442 (59.2%) to 10,632 (40.8%), to win the election to succeed George T. Kenney, becoming the first Democrat ever elected to represent the 170th district.

In 2010, Boyle was reelected, defeating Republican Marc Collazzo, 64% to 36%.

In 2012, Boyle ran unopposed and was selected as chair of the Pennsylvania House Democratic Campaign Committee, the campaign arm of the Pennsylvania House Democratic Caucus.

Boyle ran unopposed again in 2014 resigned his seat on January 2, 2015, before being sworn in as a member of the United States House of Representatives. He was succeeded by Martina White.

=== Tenure ===
As a state lawmaker, Boyle's focus was on greater educational access, healthcare and greater economic equality.

As the first member of his family to attend college, he prioritized greater access to higher education. During his first term in office, he introduced the REACH Scholarship program, which would offer tuition-free public college for qualifying Pennsylvania students.

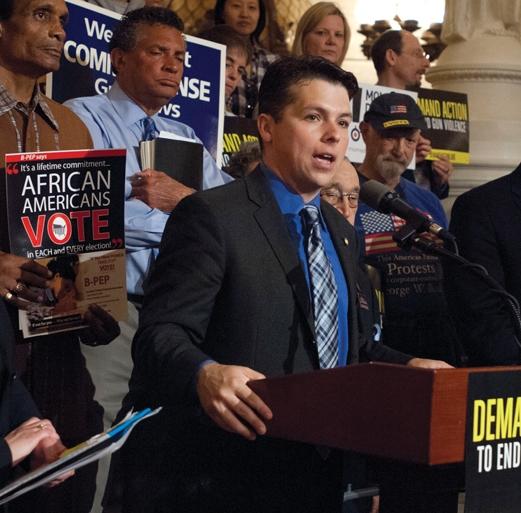
Then state Rep. Boyle speaking at a press conference in the Pennsylvania State Capitol, June 2013

He fought cuts to public K-12 and higher education funding, and supported greater investment in infrastructure, voting in 2013 for legislation (passed into law as Act 89) that provided the first comprehensive transportation funding overhaul in Pennsylvania in nearly 20 years, providing several billion dollars in new funds for roads, bridges and mass transit. He also founded the Eastern Montgomery County-Northeast Philadelphia Legislative Alliance, a group of local and state lawmakers who work across Northeast Philadelphia and Montgomery County on issues affecting both regions.

Boyle was a founding member of the LGBT Equality Caucus during his first term in office, voting in favor of legislation in 2009 prohibiting discrimination of LGBT Pennsylvanians in work, housing and other areas the only time it passed out of committee. In 2014, he introduced legislation to amend Pennsylvania's hate crimes statutes to include crimes perpetrated based on sexual orientation.

Boyle also introduced legislation in 2011 to make genocide education a required part of Pennsylvania public school curricula, legislation that was eventually passed into law in 2014. In 2013, he introduced legislation to expand access to school counseling services, which resulted in him being selected as recipient of the 2013 Pennsylvania School Counselor Association's "Legislator of the Year" award. In 2014, he introduced the SAFER PA Act, which required timely testing of DNA evidence kits and that backlogged and untested evidence be reported to the state. It would also require that authorities notify victims or surviving family when DNA testing is completed. The SAFER PA Act was reintroduced and signed into law by Governor Tom Wolf in 2015.

=== Committee assignments ===
- Appropriations
- Insurance
- Labor Relations
- Liquor Control
- Policy

== U.S. House of Representatives (2015–present) ==
=== Elections ===
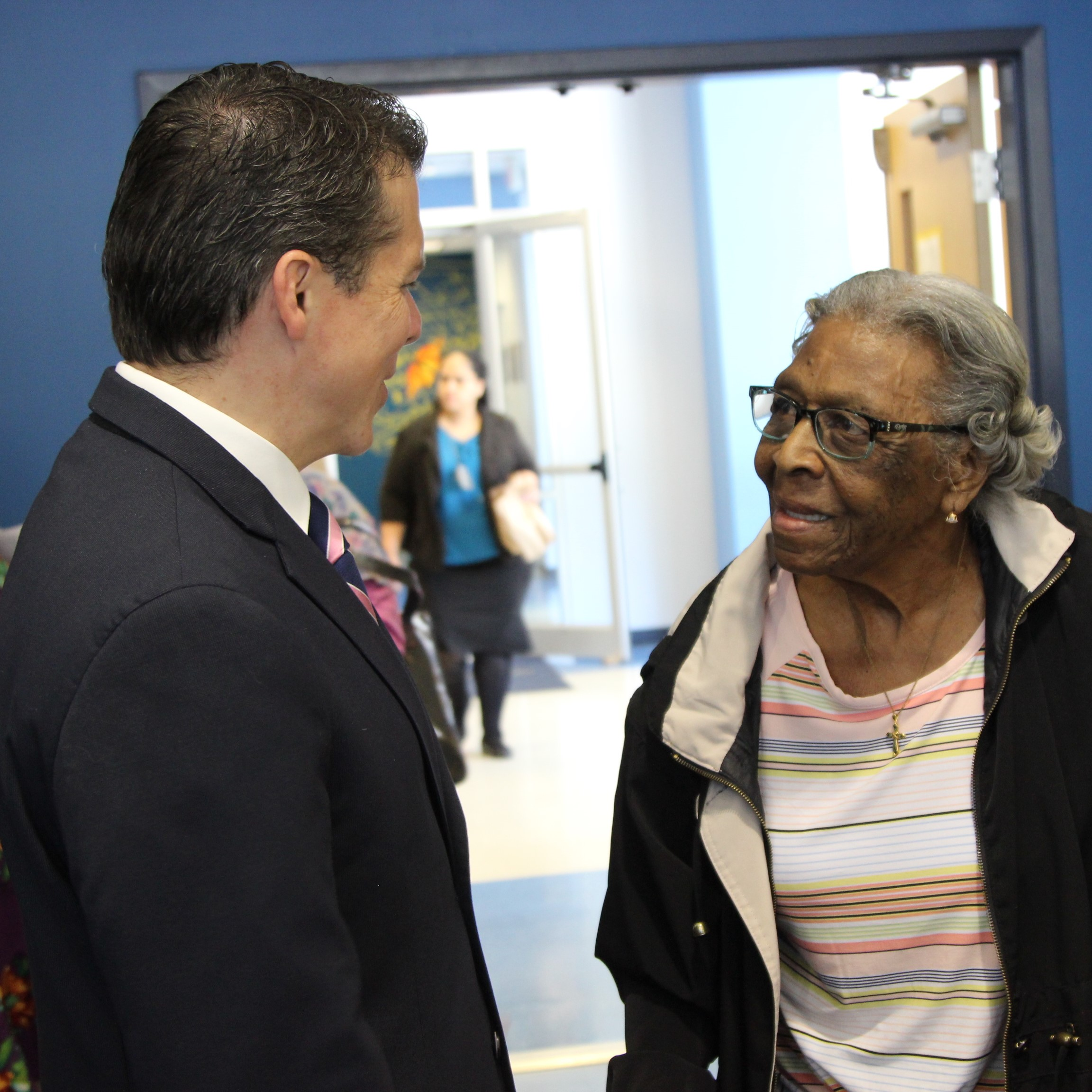
Boyle speaking with a constituent at his annual Senior Expo in North Philadelphia, June 2019

==== 2014 ====
In April 2013, Boyle announced his candidacy for Pennsylvania's 13th congressional district, which stretched from Montgomery County to northeast Philadelphia. The incumbent, Allyson Schwartz, gave up the seat to run for governor. Boyle had the support of nearly 30 labor unions across the Philadelphia region.

Boyle ran against former U.S. representative Marjorie Margolies, then state senator Daylin Leach and current Montgomery County commissioner Valerie Arkoosh for the Democratic nomination. Despite Margolies entering the race with a 32-point lead over Boyle in early polling, and having the endorsement of former President Bill Clinton, as well as support from former Pennsylvania Governor Ed Rendell and Congressman and Philadelphia Democratic Chair Bob Brady, Boyle won the primary with 41% of the vote to Margolies's 27%.

Boyle won the general election on November 4, 2014, defeating Republican nominee Carson "Dee" Adcock with 67% of the vote.

==== 2018 ====
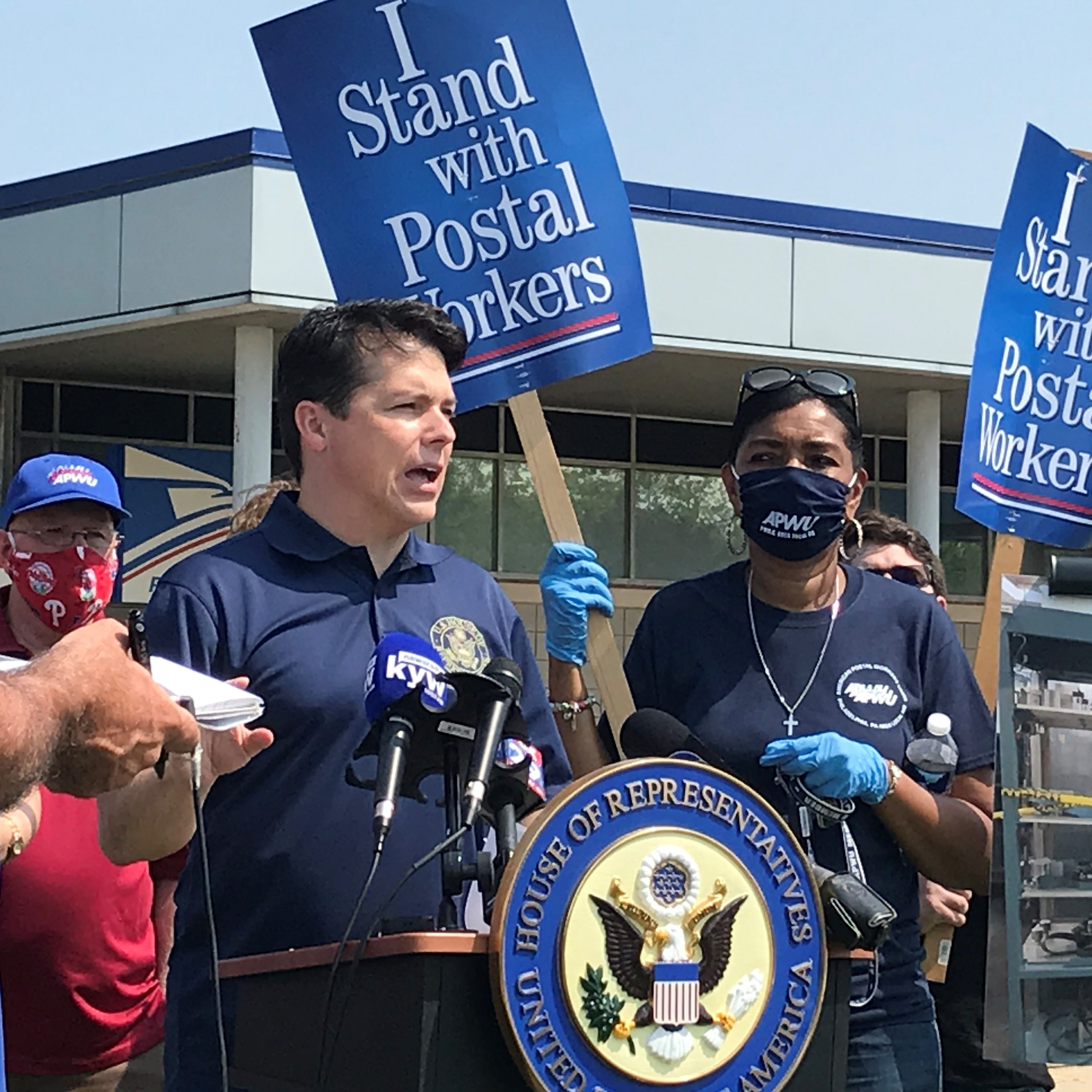
Boyle speaking at a rally to support U.S. Postal Service workers, August 2020

The Supreme Court of Pennsylvania imposed a new map for Pennsylvania's congressional districts in February 2018. Boyle then announced that he would run for reelection in the new 2nd district. This district had previously been the 1st district, represented by retiring fellow Democrat Bob Brady. But the new 2nd absorbed all of the Philadelphia portion of the old 13th, including Boyle's home. PoliticsPA rated Boyle's district as not vulnerable (a safe seat).

=== Tenure ===
In 2022, FiveThirtyEight believed that Boyle voted with President Joe Biden's stated position 100% of the time.

After Mondelez International announced that it would close a Philadelphia factory, Boyle announced his support for the Oreo Boycott by appearing with a poster featuring an Oreo cookie red circle and line through it, accompanied by the message, "Say no to Oreo". He noted that Mondelez's CEO had received a pay increase.

Along with Representative Marc Veasey (D-Texas), Boyle is co-founder and chair of the Blue Collar Caucus, which aims to promote discussion and develop legislation to help "addressing wage stagnation, job insecurity, trade, offshoring, and dwindling career opportunities for those in the manufacturing and building trades".

Boyle filed the Standardizing Testing and Accountability Before Large Elections Giving Electors Necessary Information for Unobstructed Selection Act (Stable Genius Act) in 2018. The measure would compel "nominees of each political party to file a report with the Federal Election Commission certifying that he or she underwent a medical exam by the Secretary of the Navy" containing the exam's results.

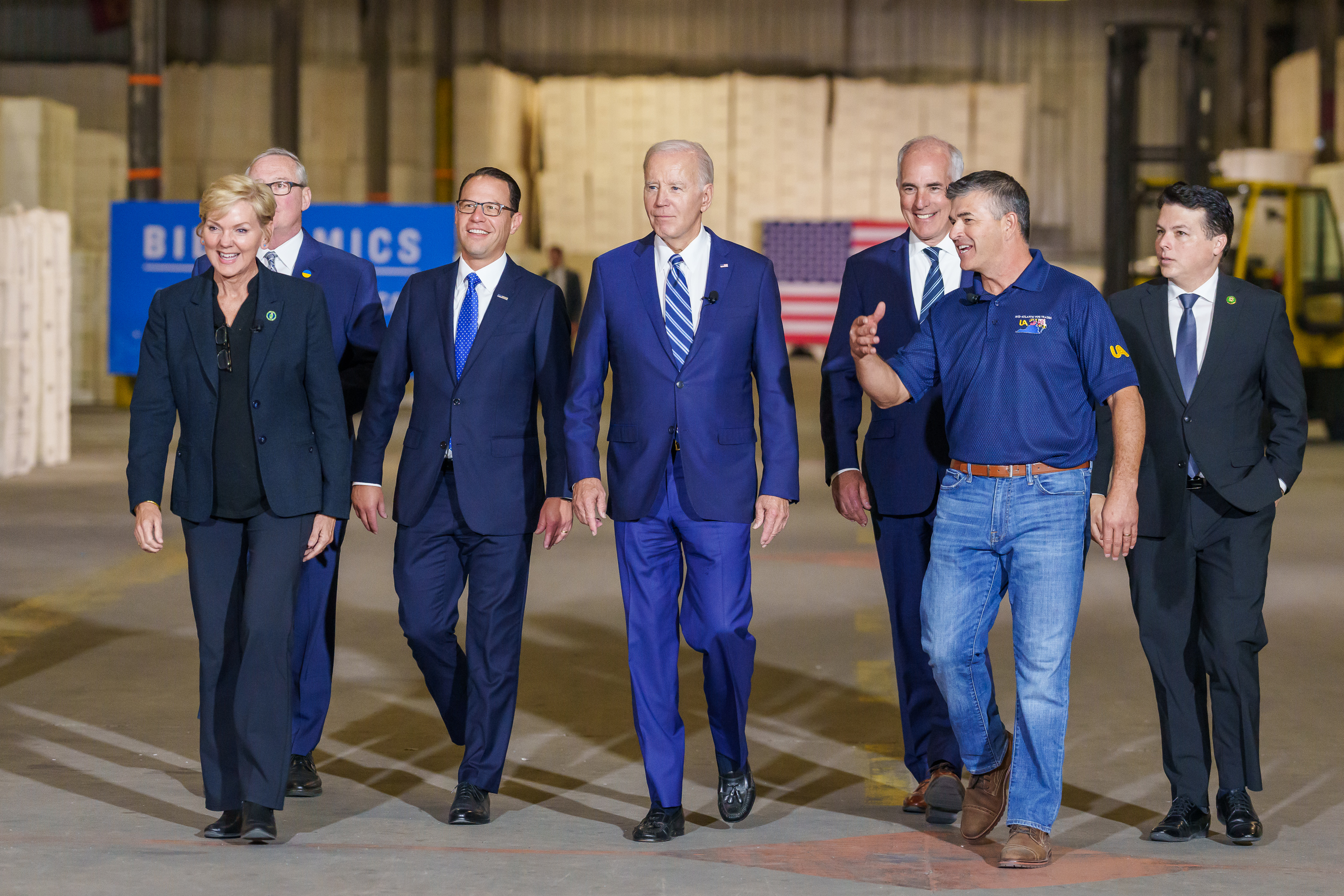
Boyle (far-right) with Joe Biden in October 2023

Boyle and other members of Congress' Philadelphia delegation sought federal funding to remove asbestos, mold, lead paint, and other environmental toxins from schools.

Boyle was one of the first members of Congress to endorse Joe Biden for president in 2020, doing so the day Biden declared his candidacy.

Boyle was selected as one of 17 speakers to jointly deliver the keynote address at the 2020 Democratic National Convention.

On immigration, Boyle was one of 36 Democrats to vote in favor of the POLICE Act of 2023, which would make assaulting a first responder a deportable offense. He also voted in favor of making Social Security fraud or identification fraud grounds for inadmissibility and deportation. He joined the majority of House Democrats in opposing the Laken Riley Act, a bill to require immigration authorities to detain migrants suspected of burglary and theft.

Boyle was one of 74 Democrats who voted to classify fentanyl-related substances as a Schedule I controlled substance.

Boyle voted to provide support to Israel during the Gaza war.

Boyle voted in favor of three military aid package supplementals for Ukraine, Israel, and Taiwan respectively in April 2024, along with most Democrats. He stated that "This critical funding will protect our national security by supporting our democratic allies around the world. It will ensure that Ukraine has the support it needs to fight back against Vladimir Putin, and that Israel can continue to defend itself against Hamas while delivering vital humanitarian assistance to civilians in Gaza."

On July 20, 2024, Boyle called on U.S. Secret Service Director Kimberly Cheatle to resign in the wake of an assassination attempt against former President Trump, making him the first Congressional Democrat to do so.

In November 2024, Boyle praised the possible return of Robert Lighthizer as United States Trade Representative, who served as Donald Trump's appointee during his first presidential term.

In 2025, Boyle was one of 46 House Democrats who joined all Republicans to vote for the Laken Riley Act.

Boyle is member of the centrist Majority Democrats and Israel Allies Caucus.

=== Ratings ===
Boyle has received the following ratings from advocacy organizations:

- Human Rights Campaign: 100%
- League of Conservation Voters: 100%
- Planned Parenthood Action Fund: 100%
- American Civil Liberties Union: 88%
- The National Organization for the Reform of Marijuana Laws:A+
- United States Chamber of Commerce: 58%
- FreedomWorks: 5%

=== Committee assignments ===
- Committee on Ways and Means
- Budget Committee (Ranking Member)

=== Caucus memberships ===
- Congressional Equality Caucus
- Congressional Asian Pacific American Caucus
- Congressional Taiwan Caucus
- Climate Solutions Caucus
- Congressional Solar Caucus
- Congressional Progressive Caucus
- Future Forum
- New Democrat Coalition
- Medicare for All Caucus
- Blue Collar Caucus (Chair)
- Congressional Caucus on Turkey and Turkish Americans
- Congressional Ukraine Caucus
- House BIOTech Caucus

== Personal life ==
Boyle and his wife Jennifer, a teacher, have one daughter. As of 2015, they reside in Philadelphia's Somerton neighborhood.

Boyle is a Catholic. He is known for his dedication to social justice, and was honored by the Network Lobby for Catholic Social Justice in April 2023 for his voting record. Boyle's religion comes from his working-class Irish-American family; he was described as an Irish Catholic Democrat who "married his economic populism with the defense and foreign policy preferences of an old-school Democrat".

Boyle's brother Kevin served as a representative of Pennsylvania's 172nd House district having been elected in 2010. Kevin lost his seat following a primary defeat in 2024. The Boyles were the first brothers to serve simultaneously in the Pennsylvania House.

== Electoral history ==
=== Pennsylvania General Assembly ===
Pennsylvania's 170th State House district results, 2008
Party	Candidate	Votes	%
Democratic	Brendan Boyle	15,865	59.21
Republican	Matt Taubenberger	10,931	40.79
Total votes		26,796	100
Democratic gain from Republican			

Pennsylvania's 170th State House district results, 2010
Party	Candidate	Votes	%
Democratic	Brendan Boyle (incumbent)	10,860	63.59
Republican	Marc Collazzo	6,219	36.41
Total votes		17,079	100
Democratic hold			

Pennsylvania's 170th State House district results, 2012
Party	Candidate	Votes	%
Democratic	Brendan Boyle (incumbent)	18,612	100.00
Total votes		18,612	100
Democratic hold			

=== United States Congress ===
Pennsylvania's 13th congressional district results, 2014
Primary election
Party	Candidate	Votes	%
Democratic	Brendan Boyle	24,775	40.61
Democratic	Marjorie Margolies	16,723	27.41
Democratic	Daylin Leach	10,130	16.60
Democratic	Valerie Arkoosh	9,386	15.38
Total votes		61,014	100
General election
Democratic	Brendan Boyle	123,601	67.12
Republican	Carson Dee Adcock	60,549	32.88
Total votes		184,150	100
Democratic hold			

Pennsylvania's 13th congressional district results, 2016
Party	Candidate	Votes	%
Democratic	Brendan Boyle (incumbent)	239,316	100.00
Total votes		239,316	100
Democratic hold			

Pennsylvania's 2nd congressional district results, 2018
Primary election
Party	Candidate	Votes	%
Democratic	Brendan Boyle (incumbent)	23,641	64.57
Democratic	Michele Lawrence	12,974	35.43
Total votes		36,615	100
General election
Democratic	Brendan Boyle (incumbent)	159,600	79.02
Republican	David Torres	42,382	20.98
Total votes		201,982	100
Democratic hold			

Pennsylvania's 2nd congressional district results, 2020
Party	Candidate	Votes	%
Democratic	Brendan Boyle (incumbent)	198,140	72.54
Republican	David Torres	75,022	27.46
Total votes		273,162	100
Democratic hold			

Pennsylvania's 2nd congressional district results, 2022
Party	Candidate	Votes	%
Democratic	Brendan Boyle (incumbent)	141,229	75.65
Republican	Haroon "Aaron" Bashir	45,454	24.35
Total votes		186,683	100
Democratic hold			

Pennsylvania's 2nd congressional district results, 2024
Party	Candidate	Votes	%
Democratic	Brendan Boyle (incumbent)	193,691	71.46
Republican	Haroon "Aaron" Bashir	77,355	28.54
Total votes		271,046	100
Democratic hold			

== Awards and honors ==
In August 2008 Boyle was named "one of top 10 rising stars" in politics by the Philadelphia Daily News.

In 2011 the Aspen Institute chose Boyle as one of its Rodel Fellows, a program that "seeks to enhance our democracy by identifying and bringing together the nation's most promising young political leaders."

U.S. House of Representatives
Preceded by Allyson Schwartz	Member of the U.S. House of Representatives from Pennsylvania's 2nd congressional district 2015–2019	Succeeded by John Joyce
Preceded by Dwight Evans	Member of the U.S. House of Representatives from Pennsylvania's 2nd congressional district 2019–present	Incumbent
Party political offices
Preceded by Elizabeth Warren	Keynote Speaker of the Democratic National Convention; 2020; Served alongside: Stacey Abrams, Raumesh Akbari, Colin Allred, Yvanna Cancela, Kathleen Clyde, Nikki Fried, Robert Garcia, Malcolm Kenyatta, Marlon Kimpson, Conor Lamb, Mari Manoogian, Victoria Neave, Jonathan Nez, Sam Park, Denny Ruprecht, Randall Woodfin	Succeeded by Angela Alsobrooks
U.S. order of precedence (ceremonial)
Preceded by Mike Bost	United States representatives by seniority 130th	Succeeded by Buddy Carter
