= Stable Genius Act =

Proposed requirement for presidential candidate medical exams

- Long title: To amend the Federal Election Campaign Act of 1971 to require the principal campaign committee of a candidate in a general election for the office of President to file a certification that the candidate has undergone a medical examination conducted by a medical office under the jurisdiction of the Secretary of the Navy.
- Acronyms (colloquial): STABLE GENIUS Act
- Nicknames: Standardizing Testing and Accountability Before Large Elections Giving Electors Necessary Information for Unobstructed Selection Act
- Announced in: the 115th United States Congress
- Sponsored by: Rep. Boyle, Brendan F. D-PA-13

Citations
- Public law: Pub. L. 115–4742 (text) (PDF)

Codification
- Acts affected: Federal Election Campaign Act
- Titles affected: 52
- U.S.C. sections affected: 304

Legislative history
- Introduced in the House as H.R. 4742 by Brendan Boyle on January 9, 2018; Committee consideration by House Committee on House Administration

The STABLE GENIUS Act was a proposed Act of Congress authored by U.S. Rep. Brendan Boyle (D–PA–02) to require presidential candidates to have a medical exam and publicly disclose the results before the general election. The name of the act is a backronym for "Standardizing Testing and Accountability Before Large Elections Giving Electors Necessary Information for Unobstructed Selection". It is a reference to a two-part tweet sent by President Donald Trump referring to himself as a "stable genius". It was originally proposed on January 9, 2018 to the 115th Congress as HR 4742, and was reintroduced on July 12, 2019 to the 116th Congress as HR 3736. No action on the bills was taken after being referred to committee.

== Background ==
President Donald Trump's first use of the term was in response to allegations of mental health problems in Fire and Fury, a book published on January 5, 2018, which was followed by extensive discussion of the subject on cable news. On January 6, 2018 Trump tweeted "Actually, throughout my life, my two greatest assets have been mental stability and being, like, really smart.... I went from VERY successful businessman, to top T.V. Star... to President of the United States (on my first try). I think that would qualify as not smart, but genius....and a very stable genius at that!" He has described himself as an "extremely stable genius" or "true stable genius" on several subsequent occasions. On one such occasion he also called on multiple members of his staff to testify that he was calm and under control.

== Legislation ==
Brendan Boyle (D–PA–02) introduced the legislation as HR 4742 on January 9, 2018. It was immediately referred to the House Committee on House Administration, but no further action was taken.

In July 2019, months after the Democrats won majority status in the House of Representatives, Boyle reintroduced the legislation as HR 3736, where it was again referred to the House Committee on House Administration, but no further action was taken.

== Reaction ==
On the January 10, 2018 edition of MSNBC's Morning Joe, Boyle said "Hopefully I have the best words to describe this", referring to the comment Trump made on the campaign trail: "I'm very highly educated. I know words, I know the best words. But there's no better word than stupid."

That night, Tonight Show host Jimmy Fallon suggested an alternate name for the bill: "It is called the Too Little, Too Late Act."
