= 2018 Pennsylvania elections =

- November 6, 2018

Elections were held in Pennsylvania on November 6, 2018. On that date, the state held elections for governor and lieutenant governor (on one ticket), U.S. Senate, U.S. House of Representatives, Pennsylvania State Senate, Pennsylvania House of Representatives, and various others. Primary elections took place on May 15, 2018.

== Background ==
On Election Day, Democratic Gov. Tom Wolf was re-elected with new Lt. Gov. John Fetterman, as was incumbent Democratic U.S. Senator Bob Casey Jr. Democrats gained five seats in Pennsylvania's congressional delegation, bringing the delegation to a 9–9 split. Democrats also broke a Republican supermajority in the Pennsylvania State Senate by gaining five seats, and gained eleven seats in the Pennsylvania House of Representatives.

== United States Senate ==
Incumbent Democratic Senator Bob Casey Jr. sought reelection against Republican Congressman Lou Barletta in the general election. He won with 56% of the vote.

== United States House of Representatives ==
=== Redistricting ===
Court-mandated districts for 2018 elections

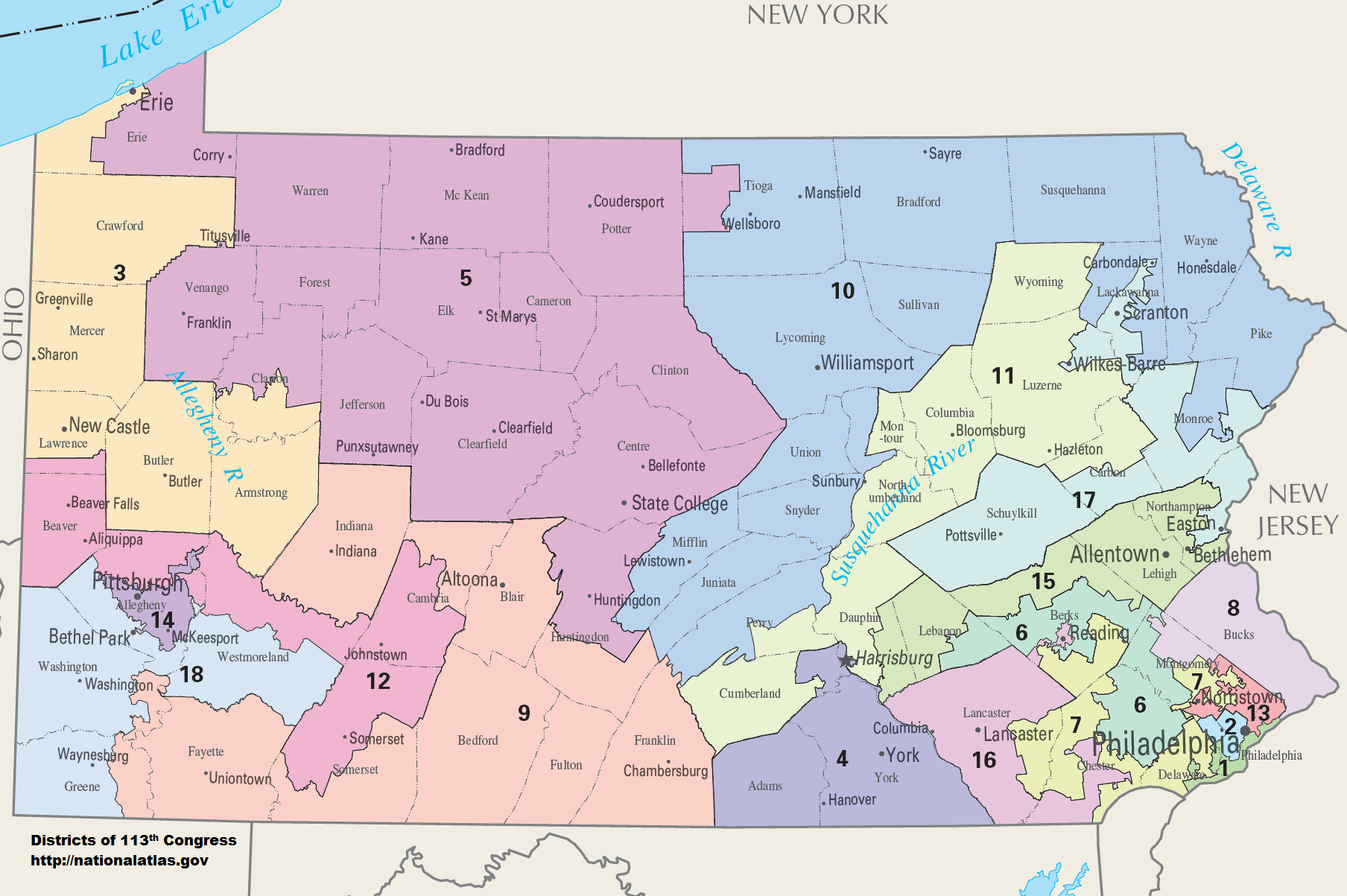
Congressional district map (2013–2018)

In January 2018, the Pennsylvania Supreme Court struck down the state's congressional map, ruling it had been unfairly gerrymandered to favor Republicans. New maps were subsequently adopted in February 2018, for use in 2018's elections and taking effect with representation in 2019.

=== Special elections ===
==== 18th congressional district ====
A special election for Pennsylvania's 18th congressional district was held on March 13, 2018, following the resignation of Republican Rep. Tim Murphy.

==== 7th and 15th congressional districts ====
Along with the general election, special elections were also held on November 6, following the resignations of Republican Reps. Pat Meehan (PA-7) and Charlie Dent (PA-15).

=== General election ===
Voters in Pennsylvania elected 18 candidates to serve in the U.S. House, one from each of the 18 congressional districts.

District	Democratic nominee	Republican nominee	Libertarian nominee
District 1	Scott Wallace	Brian Fitzpatrick, incumbent	
District 2	Brendan Boyle, incumbent	David Torres	
District 3	Dwight Evans, incumbent	Bryan E. Leib	
District 4	Madeleine Dean	Dan David	
District 5	Mary Gay Scanlon	Pearl Kim	
District 6	Chrissy Houlahan	Greg McCauley	
District 7	Susan Wild	Marty Nothstein	Tim Silfies
District 8	Matt Cartwright, incumbent	John Chrin	
District 9	Denny Wolff	Dan Meuser	
District 10	George Scott	Scott Perry, incumbent	
District 11	Jess King	Lloyd Smucker, incumbent	
District 12	Marc Friedenburg	Tom Marino, incumbent	
District 13	Brent Ottaway	John Joyce	
District 14	Bibiana Boerio	Guy Reschenthaler	
District 15	Susan Boser	Glenn Thompson, incumbent	
District 16	Ronald DiNicola	Mike Kelly, incumbent	Ebert "Bill" Beeman
District 17	Conor Lamb, incumbent	Keith Rothfus, incumbent	
District 18	Michael Doyle, incumbent		

== Governor and lieutenant governor ==
One-term Governor Tom Wolf and Lt. Governor Mike Stack were both eligible for re-election. Stack was defeated in his primary by Braddock mayor John Fetterman. Wolf and Fetterman went on to defeat the Republican ticket of State Senator Scott Wagner and businessman Jeff Bartos.

== Pennsylvania Senate ==
25 of 50 seats (even-numbered districts) in the Pennsylvania Senate were up for election in Pennsylvania's general election.

== Pennsylvania House of Representatives ==
=== Special elections ===
Special elections were held for the 35th, 48th, 68th, and 178th districts prior to the general election.

=== General election ===
All 203 seats in the Pennsylvania House of Representatives were up for election in the general election.

== Pennsylvania ballot measures ==
There were no statewide ballot measures up for election in this general election; however, there were local ballot measures in Allengeny and Philadelphia Counties.

== See also ==
- Elections in Pennsylvania
- Electoral reform in Pennsylvania
- Bilingual elections requirement for Pennsylvania (per Voting Rights Act Amendments of 2006)
- Political party strength in Pennsylvania
- Politics of Pennsylvania
