= 2018 United States House of Representatives elections in Pennsylvania =

- November 6, 2018

All 18 Pennsylvania seats to the United States House of Representatives
	Majority party	Minority party
Party	Democratic	Republican
Last election	5	13
Seats before	6	12
Seats won	9	9
Seat change	▲3	▼3
Popular vote	2,712,665	2,206,260
Percentage	55.03%	44.75%
Swing	▲9.33%	▼9.16%

Democratic hold Democratic gain
Republican hold Republican gain
Democratic
50–60%
60–70%
70–80%
80–90%
>90%
Republican
50–60%
60–70%
70–80%
80–90%

The 2018 United States House of Representatives elections in Pennsylvania were held on November 6, 2018, to elect the 18 U.S. representatives from the Commonwealth of Pennsylvania, one from each of the state's 18 congressional districts.

The elections coincided with the 2018 gubernatorial election, as well as other elections to the House of Representatives, elections to the United States Senate, and various state and local elections.

In January 2018, the Pennsylvania Supreme Court struck down the state's congressional map, ruling it had been unfairly gerrymandered to favor Republicans. New maps were subsequently adopted in February 2018.

The 2018 general election saw the Democrats gain four seats and the Republicans gain one seat, for a Democratic net gain of three seats, changing the state's representation from 12 to 6 Republican to a 9–9 tie. In addition, Pennsylvanians in several districts elected female candidates to the U.S. House, thus ending four years of all-male Congressional representation in the state.

== Redistricting ==
Court-mandated districts for 2018 elections

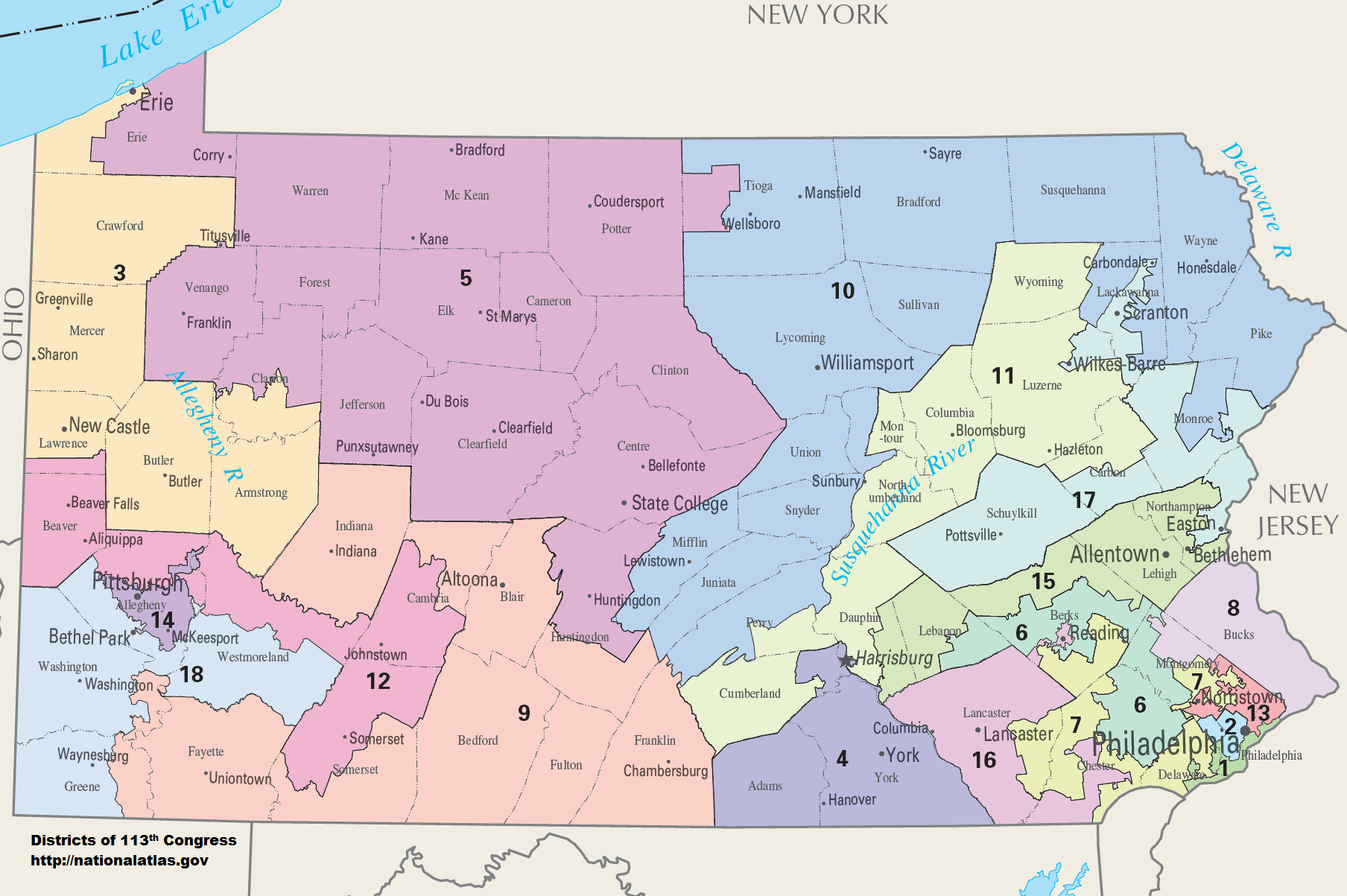
Congressional district map (2013–2018)

In January 2018, the Pennsylvania Supreme Court struck down the state's congressional map, ruling it had been unfairly gerrymandered to favor Republicans. New maps were subsequently adopted in February 2018, for use in the 2018 elections; they took effect with representation in 2019.

== Overview ==
=== Statewide ===
Party	Candidates	Votes		Seats		
Party	Candidates	No.	%	No.	+/–	%
Democratic	18	2,712,665	54.92%	9	▲3	50.00%
Republican	17	2,206,260	44.67%	9	▼3	50.00%
Libertarian	2	10,950	0.22%	0	Steady	0.00%
Write-in	1	9,452	0.19%	0	Steady	0.00%
Total	38	4,939,327	100.0%	18	Steady	100.00%

Popular vote
Democratic	54.97%
Republican	44.81%
Libertarian	0.22%
Write-in	0.19%

House seats
Democratic	50.00%
Republican	50.00%
Libertarian	0.00%

=== District ===
Results of the 2018 United States House of Representatives elections in Pennsylvania:

District	Democratic		Republican		Others		Total		Result
District	Votes	%	Votes	%	Votes	%	Votes	%	Result
District 1	160,745	48.74%	169,053	51.26%	0	0.00%	329,798	100.0%	Republican hold
District 2	159,600	79.02%	42,382	20.98%	0	0.00%	201,982	100.0%	Democratic hold
District 3	287,610	93.38%	20,387	6.62%	0	0.00%	307,997	100.0%	Democratic hold
District 4	211,524	63.52%	121,467	36.48%	0	0.00%	332,991	100.0%	Democratic hold
District 5	198,639	65.19%	106,075	34.81%	0	0.00%	304,714	100.0%	Democratic gain
District 6	177,704	58.88%	124,124	41.12%	0	0.00%	301,828	100.0%	Democratic gain
District 7	140,813	53.49%	114,437	43.47%	8,011	3.04%	263,261	100.0%	Democratic gain
District 8	135,603	54.64%	112,563	45.36%	0	0.00%	248,166	100.0%	Democratic hold
District 9	100,204	40.25%	148,723	59.75%	0	0.00%	248,927	100.0%	Republican hold
District 10	141,668	48.68%	149,365	51.32%	0	0.00%	291,033	100.0%	Republican hold
District 11	113,876	41.02%	163,708	58.98%	0	0.00%	277,584	100.0%	Republican hold
District 12	82,825	33.96%	161,047	66.04%	0	0.00%	243,872	100.0%	Republican hold
District 13	74,733	29.51%	178,533	70.49%	0	0.00%	253,266	100.0%	Republican hold
District 14	110,051	42.09%	151,386	57.91%	0	0.00%	261,437	100.0%	Republican gain
District 15	78,327	32.16%	165,245	67.84%	0	0.00%	243,572	100.0%	Republican hold
District 16	124,109	47.30%	135,348	51.58%	2,939	1.12%	262,396	100.0%	Republican hold
District 17	183,162	56.26%	142,417	43.74%	0	0.00%	325,579	100.00%	Democratic gain
District 18	231,472	96.08%	0	0.00%	9,452	3.92%	240,924	100.0%	Democratic hold
Total	2,712,665	54.92%%	2,206,260	44.67%	20,402	0.41%	4,939,327	100.0%	

== District 1 ==
2018 Pennsylvania's 1st congressional district election
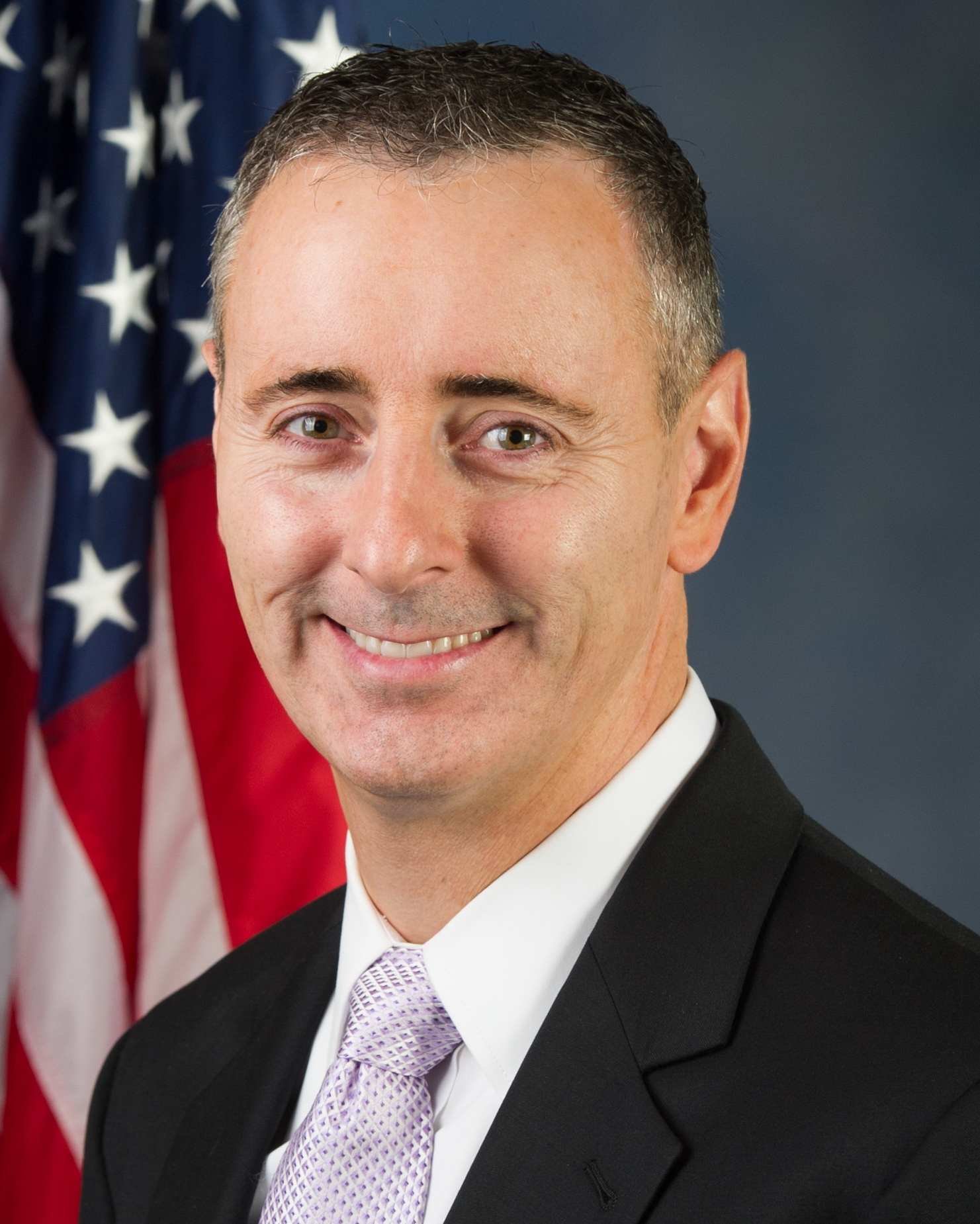

Nominee	Brian Fitzpatrick	Scott Wallace
Party	Republican	Democratic
Popular vote	169,053	160,745
Percentage	51.3%	48.7%
- Fitzpatrick: 50–60% 60–70% Wallace: 50–60% 60–70% 70–80% >90% Tie: 50%
U.S. Representative before election
Brian Fitzpatrick (8th)
Republican
Elected U.S. Representative
Brian Fitzpatrick
Republican

The 1st district previously consisted of central and South Philadelphia, the City of Chester, the Philadelphia International Airport and other small sections of Delaware County. Under the new congressional map that was in place in 2019 (represented per 2018's elections), the first district overlaps with much of the former 8th district, which was represented by Republican Representative Brian Fitzpatrick. Fitzpatrick took office in 2017, succeeding his brother, former Representative Mike Fitzpatrick. The new 1st district consists of Bucks County and a small portion of Montgomery County.

=== Republican primary ===
==== Candidates ====
===== Nominee =====
- Brian Fitzpatrick, incumbent U.S. representative

===== Eliminated in primary =====
- Dean Malik, former Bucks County assistant district attorney and candidate for this seat in 2010 & 2016

===== Withdrawn =====
- Valerie Mihalek, former Yardley Borough council member and deputy district director for former U.S. Rep. Mike Fitzpatrick

==== Primary results ====
Republican primary results
Party	Candidate	Votes	%
Republican	Brian Fitzpatrick (incumbent)	31,374	67.00
Republican	Dean Malik	15,451	33.00
Total votes		46,825	100.00

=== Democratic primary ===
The old 8th district was included on the initial list of Republican held seats being targeted by the Democratic Congressional Campaign Committee.

==== Candidates ====
===== Nominee =====
- Scott Wallace, charitable foundation director and grandson of former Vice President Henry Wallace

===== Eliminated in primary =====
- Steven Bacher, environmentalist
- Rachel Reddick, former Navy prosecutor

===== Declined =====
- Diane Ellis-Marseglia, Bucks County commissioner

==== Campaign ====
The race featured a number of negative ads between Reddick and Wallace. With Reddick's campaign releasing an ad calling Wallace a “Maryland multi-millionaire” and stating that he had case an absentee ballot cast from his second home in a South African “gated luxury estate”. The Wallace campaign responded with an ad higlishting Reddick flubbing a question about the so-called “global gag rule” during a campaign stop in Ottsville, and for her having been registered as a Republican for most of her adult life.

Many DC Democrats expressed excitement about Wallace's potential to spend big to defeat Fitzpatrick, especially in the expensive Philadelphia market. He loaned his campaign $2.5 million while Reddick only raised $363,000 and was shunned by most party strategists.

==== Endorsements ====
Rachel Reddick

U.S. representatives

- Lois Frankel, U.S. representative from Florida's 21st congressional district
- Seth Moulton, U.S. representative from Massachusetts's 6th congressional district

Statewide officials

- Ed Rendell, former governor of Pennsylvania

Organizations

- EMILY's List
- Moms Demand Action
- Montgomery County Democratic Committee
- VoteVets
- With Honor Fund
Scott Wallace

Organizations

- Bucks County Democratic Committee
- Congressional Progressive Caucus
- Friends of the Earth Action
- People for the American Way

Local officials

- Diane Ellis-Marseglia, Bucks County commissioner

==== Primary results ====
Democratic primary results
Party	Candidate	Votes	%
Democratic	Scott Wallace	27,652	56.49
Democratic	Rachel Reddick	17,288	35.32
Democratic	Steven Bacher	4,006	8.18
Total votes		48,946	100.00

=== General election ===
==== Endorsements ====
Brian Fitzpatrick (R)

U.S. representatives

- Lou Barletta, U.S. representative from Pennsylvania's 11th congressional district

Statewide officials

- Mark Schweiker, former governor of Pennsylvania

Labor unions

- AFL-CIO
- American Federation of Government Employees
- American Federation of State, County and Municipal Employees
- Communications Workers of America
- International Brotherhood of Boilermakers
- International Brotherhood of Teamsters
- International Organization of Masters, Mates & Pilots
- National Education Association
- United Mine Workers of America

Organizations

- BIPAC
- Everytown for Gun Safety
- Giffords
- Humane Society of the United States
- National Federation of Independent Business
- National Republican Congressional Committee "Patriot" Program
- United States Chamber of Commerce
Scott Wallace (D)

U.S. executive branch officials

- Joe Biden, former vice president of the United States
- Barack Obama, former president of the United States

U.S. senators

- Elizabeth Warren, U.S. senator from Massachusetts (2013–present)

Labor unions

- Service Employees International Union
- United Auto Workers
- United Steelworkers

Organizations

- 21st Century Democrats
- Congressional Progressive Caucus
- Democratic Congressional Campaign Committee "Red to Blue" Program
- End Citizens United
- Friends of the Earth Action
- Indivisible
- J Street
- Moms Demand Action
- MoveOn
- National Organization for Women
- People for the American Way
- Planned Parenthood Action Fund
- Sierra Club
- Working Families Party

Local officials

- Diane Ellis-Marseglia, Bucks County commissioner
Steve Scheetz (L)

Organizations

- Firearm Owners Against Crime

==== Debate ====
2018 Pennsylvania's 1st congressional district debate
No.	Date	Host	Moderator	Link	Republican	Democratic
Key: P Participant A Absent N Not invited I Invited W Withdrawn						
Key: P Participant A Absent N Not invited I Invited W Withdrawn					Brian Fitzpatrick	Scott Wallace
1	October 19, 2018	Bucks County Chamber of Commerce; Pennsylvania Cable Network; League of Women Voters of Bucks County	Carlo Borgia		P	P

==== Polling ====
Poll source	Date(s) administered	Sample size	Margin of error	Brian Fitzpatrick (R)	Scott Wallace (D)	Other	Undecided
NYT Upshot/Siena College	October 26–29, 2018	502	± 4.7%	47%	46%	–	7%
NYT Upshot/Siena College	October 11–14, 2018	570	± 4.6%	43%	50%	–	8%
Public Opinion Strategies (R-Fitzpatrick)	October 2–4, 2018	400	± 4.9%	50%	42%	–	–
Monmouth University	September 27 – October 1, 2018	353	± 5.2%	50%	46%	1%	3%
Monmouth University	May 31 – June 3, 2018	254 LV	± 6.5%	48%	47%	0%	5%
Monmouth University	May 31 – June 3, 2018	451 RV	± 4.6%	49%	42%	1%	8%
DCCC (D)	May 12–14, 2018	540	± 4.2%	48%	46%	—	6%

==== Predictions ====
Source	Ranking	As of
The Cook Political Report	Tossup	November 5, 2018
Inside Elections	Tossup	November 5, 2018
Sabato's Crystal Ball	Lean R	November 5, 2018
RCP	Tossup	November 5, 2018
Daily Kos	Tossup	November 5, 2018
538	Tossup	November 7, 2018
CNN	Tossup	October 31, 2018
Politico	Tossup	November 4, 2018

==== Results ====
Pennsylvania's 1st congressional district, 2018
Party	Candidate	Votes	%
Republican	Brian Fitzpatrick (incumbent)	169,053	51.26
Democratic	Scott Wallace	160,745	48.74
Total votes		329,798	100.00
Republican hold			

==== Analysis ====
Fitzpatrick held out to win re-election, despite many similar suburban districts held by Republicans falling to Democrats in the 2018 cycle. Fitzpatrick did this by establishing a reputation for himself as an independent centrist who attained endorsements from several usually-left-leaning and nonpartisan groups without enraging the more fervently pro-Trump wing of the Republican party. Analysts considered the Democratic nominee Scott Wallace an unusually weak candidate: he was a wealthy heir who moved to the district, opening up accusations of carpetbagging, and made several gaffes and missteps. Editor Dave Wasserman of the Cook Political Report wrote that Wallace was perhaps the weakest candidate of the 2018 cycle.

== District 2 ==
2018 Pennsylvania's 2nd congressional district election
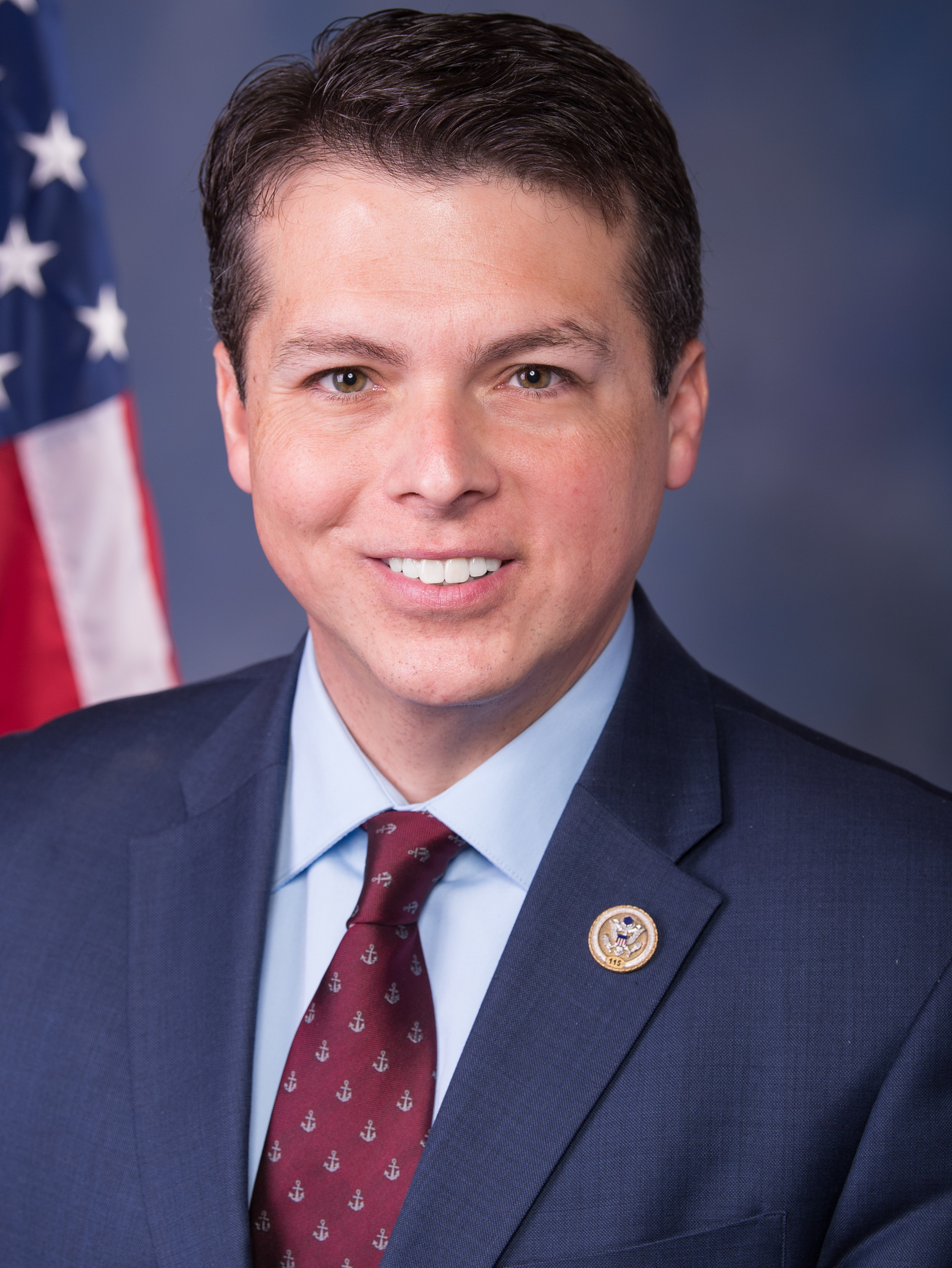

Nominee	Brendan Boyle	Dave Torres
Party	Democratic	Republican
Popular vote	159,600	42,382
Percentage	79.0%	21.0%
- Boyle: 50–60% 60–70% 70–80% 80–90% >90% Torres: 50–60%
U.S. Representative before election
Bob Brady (1st)
Democratic
Elected U.S. Representative
Brendan Boyle
Democratic

The 2nd district consists of the northern half of Philadelphia. It mostly overlaps with the old 1st District. That district's incumbent, Democrat Bob Brady, had served since 1998, but did not run for reelection. The incumbent of the old 2nd district was Dwight Evans, but Evans opted to follow most of his constituents into the 3rd District.

The new map drew the home of fellow Democrat Brendan Boyle, who had represented the neighboring 13th District since 2015, into the 2nd, leading to speculation that he would run for reelection there. Soon after the new map was released, Boyle confirmed that he would indeed run in the 2nd.

=== Democratic primary ===
==== Candidates ====
===== Nominee =====
- Brendan Boyle, incumbent U.S. representative

===== Eliminated in primary =====
- Michele Lawrence, former senior vice president for Wells Fargo

===== Declined =====
- Bob Brady, incumbent U.S. representative

==== Endorsements ====
Brendan Boyle (D)

Labor unions

- AFL-CIO
- Service Employees International Union

==== Primary results ====
Democratic primary results
Party	Candidate	Votes	%
Democratic	Brendan Boyle (incumbent)	23,261	64.5
Democratic	Michele Lawrence	12,814	35.5
Total votes		36,075	100.0

=== Republican primary ===
==== Candidates ====
===== Nominee =====
- David Torres, community activist

==== Primary results ====
Republican primary results
Party	Candidate	Votes	%
Republican	David Torres	7,443	100.0
Total votes		7,443	100.0

=== General election ===
==== Predictions ====
Source	Ranking	As of
The Cook Political Report	Safe D	November 5, 2018
Inside Elections	Safe D	November 5, 2018
Sabato's Crystal Ball	Safe D	November 5, 2018
RCP	Safe D	November 5, 2018
Daily Kos	Safe D	November 5, 2018
538	Safe D	November 7, 2018
CNN	Safe D	October 31, 2018
Politico	Safe D	November 4, 2018

==== Endorsements ====
Brendan Boyle (D)

Labor unions

- AFL-CIO
- Communications Workers of America
- International Brotherhood of Boilermakers
- Service Employees International Union

Organizations

- End Citizens United
- Sierra Club

==== Results ====
Pennsylvania's 2nd congressional district, 2018
Party	Candidate	Votes	%
Democratic	Brendan Boyle (incumbent)	159,600	79.0
Republican	David Torres	42,382	21.0
Total votes		201,982	100.0
Democratic hold			

== District 3 ==
2018 Pennsylvania's 3rd congressional district election
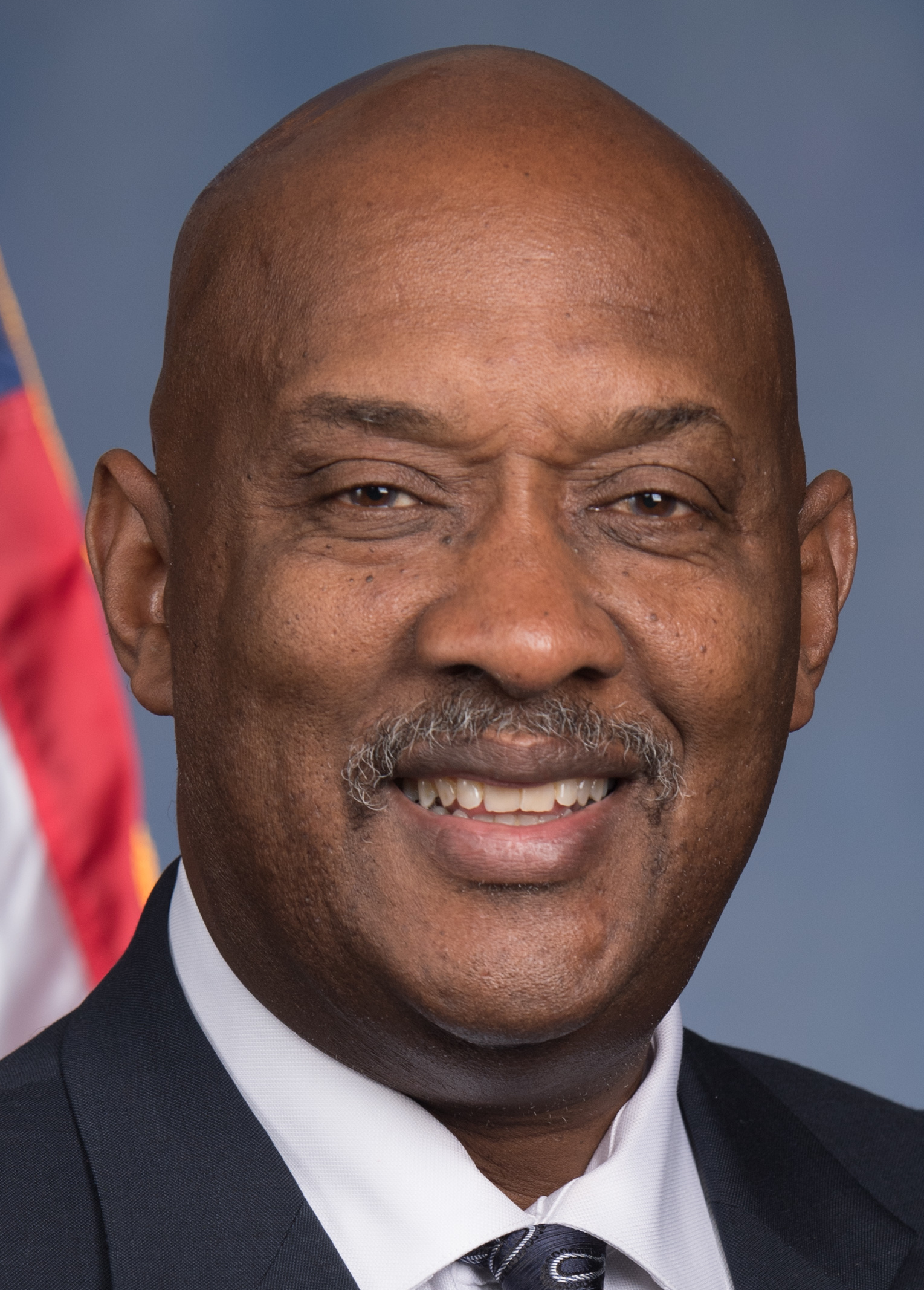

Nominee	Dwight Evans	Bryan E. Leib
Party	Democratic	Republican
Popular vote	287,610	20,387
Percentage	93.4%	6.6%
- Evans: 50–60% 60–70% 70–80% 80–90% >90%
U.S. Representative before election
Dwight Evans (2nd)
Democratic
Elected U.S. Representative
Dwight Evans
Democratic

The 3rd district was previously located in Northwestern Pennsylvania, but now covers downtown and northern Philadelphia, and overlaps with much of the previous 2nd district. The incumbent from the 2nd district was Democrat Dwight Evans, who had held office since 2016. Evans defeated incumbent Democratic Representative Chaka Fattah in the 2016 Democratic primary, and then went on to be elected with 90% in both the general election and a simultaneous special election for the remainder of the term after Fattah resigned.

=== Democratic primary ===
==== Candidates ====
===== Nominee =====
- Dwight Evans, incumbent U.S. representative

===== Eliminated in primary =====
- Kevin Johnson

==== Endorsements ====
Dwight Evans

Labor unions

- AFL-CIO
- Service Employees International Union

==== Primary results ====
Democratic primary results
Party	Candidate	Votes	%
Democratic	Dwight Evans (incumbent)	72,106	80.8
Democratic	Kevin Johnson	17,153	19.2
Total votes		89,259	100.0

=== Republican primary ===
==== Candidates ====
===== Nominee =====
- Bryan Leib

==== Primary results ====
Republican primary results
Party	Candidate	Votes	%
Republican	Bryan E. Leib	3,331	100.0
Total votes		3,331	100.0

=== General election ===
==== Predictions ====
Source	Ranking	As of
The Cook Political Report	Safe D	November 5, 2018
Inside Elections	Safe D	November 5, 2018
Sabato's Crystal Ball	Safe D	November 5, 2018
RCP	Safe D	November 5, 2018
Daily Kos	Safe D	November 5, 2018
538	Safe D	November 7, 2018
CNN	Safe D	October 31, 2018
Politico	Safe D	November 4, 2018

==== Endorsements ====
Dwight Evans (D)

Labor unions

- AFL-CIO
- Communications Workers of America
- International Brotherhood of Boilermakers
- Service Employees International Union

Organizations

- Sierra Club

==== Results ====
Pennsylvania's 3rd congressional district, 2018
Party	Candidate	Votes	%
Democratic	Dwight Evans (incumbent)	287,610	93.4
Republican	Bryan E. Leib	20,387	6.6
Total votes		307,997	100.0
Democratic hold			

== District 4 ==
2018 Pennsylvania's 4th congressional district election
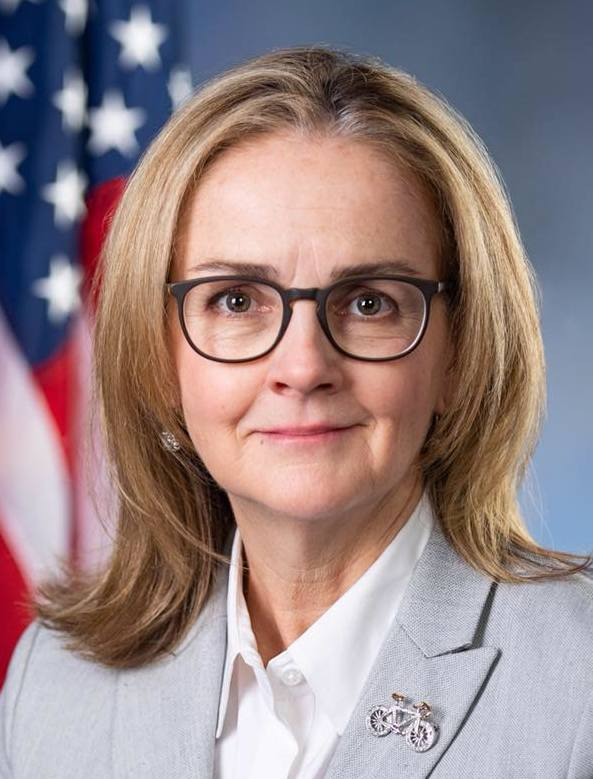

Nominee	Madeleine Dean	Dan David
Party	Democratic	Republican
Popular vote	211,524	121,467
Percentage	63.5%	36.5%
- Dean: 50–60% 60–70% 70–80% 80–90% >90% David: 50–60% 60–70% 70–80%
U.S. Representative before election
Brendan Boyle (13th)
Democratic
Elected U.S. Representative
Madeleine Dean
Democratic

The old 4th district was in South Central Pennsylvania, but the new 4th district is centered in Montgomery County. The district overlaps with the former 13th district. The incumbent from this district, Democrat Brendan Boyle, could have sought re-election in either this district or the new 2nd district, which absorbed his home and most of the old 13th's share of Philadelphia. Boyle opted to run in the 2nd, making the 4th an open seat.

=== Democratic primary ===
State Senator Daylin Leach had announced that he would run for Congress in the old 7th District, but was expected to switch races after his home was drawn into the new 4th. However, on February 24, 2018, Leach succumbed to pressures from fellow Democrats, including Governor Tom Wolf, to abandon his congressional campaign in the face of accusations of sexual harassment. However, he remained in his Pennsylvania Senate seat.

==== Candidates ====
===== Nominee =====
- Madeleine Dean, state representative

===== Eliminated in primary =====
- Shira Goodman, public policy advocate
- Joe Hoeffel, former U.S. representative, nominee for Senate in 2004 and candidate for governor in 2010

===== Withdrawn =====
- Mary Jo Daley, state representative (endorsed Dean)
- Daylin Leach, state senator and candidate for the 13th district in 2014

===== Declined =====
- Allyson Schwartz, former U.S. representative and candidate for governor in 2014

==== Endorsements ====
Madeleine Dean

State legislators

- Mary Jo Daley, state representative

Labor unions

- AFL-CIO
- Service Employees International Union

==== Primary results ====
Democratic primary results
Party	Candidate	Votes	%
Democratic	Madeleine Dean	42,625	72.6
Democratic	Shira Goodman	9,645	16.4
Democratic	Joe Hoeffel	6,431	11.0
Total votes		58,701	100.0

=== Republican primary ===
==== Candidates ====
===== Nominee =====
- Dan David, investor

==== Primary results ====
Republican primary results
Party	Candidate	Votes	%
Republican	Dan David	28,889	100.0
Total votes		28,889	100.0

=== General election ===
==== Predictions ====
Source	Ranking	As of
The Cook Political Report	Safe D	November 5, 2018
Inside Elections	Safe D	November 5, 2018
Sabato's Crystal Ball	Safe D	November 5, 2018
RCP	Safe D	November 5, 2018
Daily Kos	Safe D	November 5, 2018
538	Safe D	November 7, 2018
CNN	Safe D	October 31, 2018
Politico	Safe D	November 4, 2018

==== Endorsements ====
Madeleine Dean (D)

Executive branch officials

- Barack Obama, 44th president of the United States (2009–2017)

State legislators

- Mary Jo Daley, state representative

Labor unions

- AFL-CIO
- Communications Workers of America
- International Brotherhood of Boilermakers
- Service Employees International Union

Organizations

- Brady Campaign
- EMILY's List
- End Citizens United
- Sierra Club

==== Results ====
Pennsylvania's 4th congressional district, 2018
Party	Candidate	Votes	%
Democratic	Madeleine Dean	211,524	63.5
Republican	Dan David	121,467	36.5
Total votes		332,991	100.0
Democratic hold			

== District 5 ==
2018 Pennsylvania's 5th congressional district election
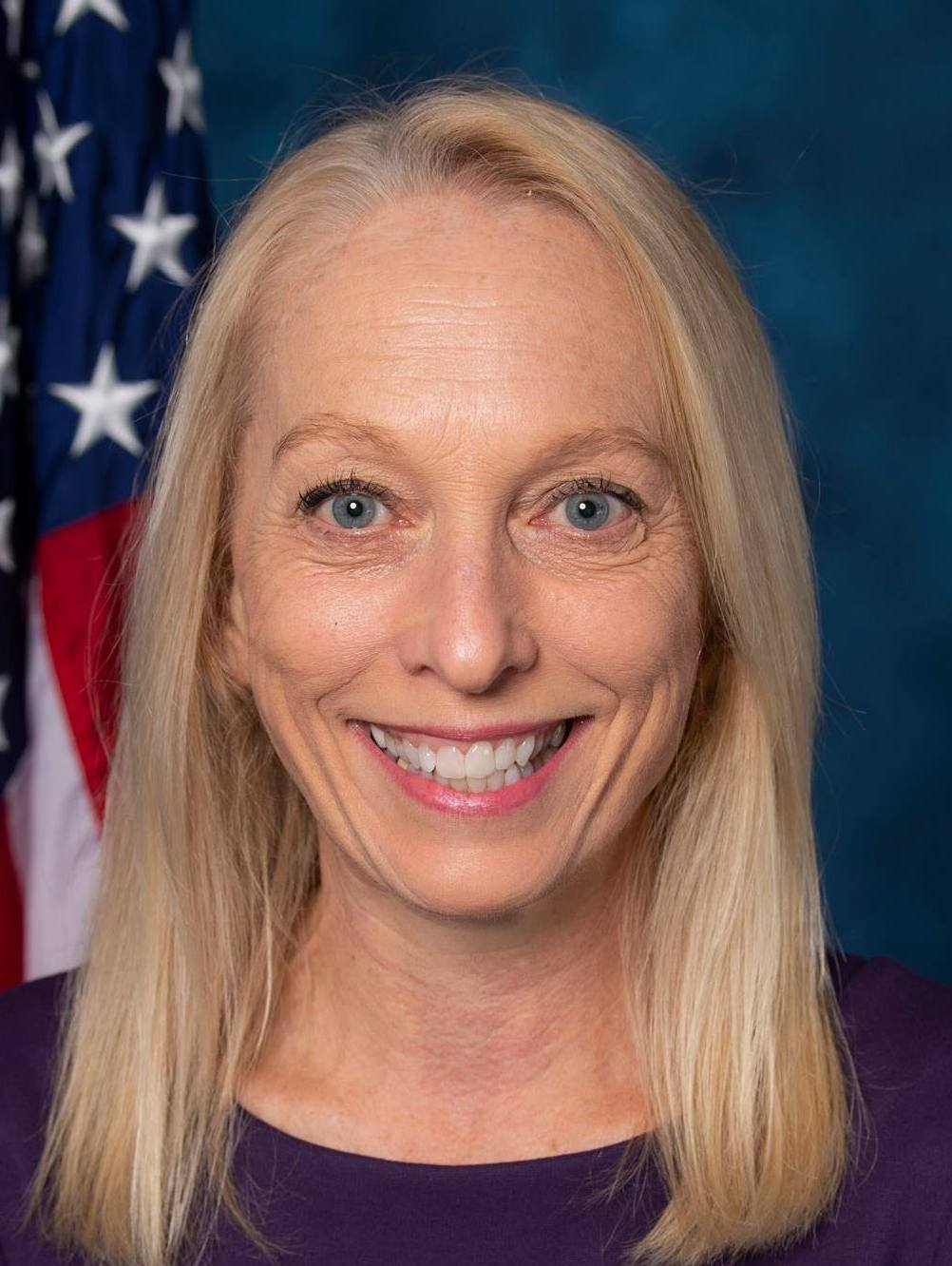

Nominee	Mary Gay Scanlon	Pearl Kim
Party	Democratic	Republican
Popular vote	198,639	106,075
Percentage	65.2%	34.8%
- Scanlon: 50–60% 60–70% 70–80% 80–90% >90% Kim: 50–60% 60–70% Tie: 50% No votes
U.S. Representative before election
Mary Gay Scanlon (7th)
Democratic
Elected U.S. Representative
Mary Gay Scanlon
Democratic

The old 5th district was in North Central Pennsylvania, but the new 5th district consists of Delaware County, portions of southern Philadelphia, and a sliver of Montgomery County. The district overlaps with much of the old 7th district, whose incumbent Republican Representative Pat Meehan chose not to seek re-election, due to allegations regarding a sexual harassment complaint that was settled with the use of taxpayer funds, and subsequently resigned from office in April.

=== Republican primary ===
==== Candidates ====
===== Nominee =====
- Pearl Kim, former deputy attorney general of Pennsylvania

===== Disqualified =====
- Paul Addis

===== Declined =====
- Pat Meehan, incumbent U.S. representative

==== Primary results ====
Republican primary results
Party	Candidate	Votes	%
Republican	Pearl Kim	33,685	100.0
Total votes		33,685	100.0

=== Democratic primary ===
==== Candidates ====
===== Nominee =====
- Mary Gay Scanlon, attorney and former Wallingford-Swarthmore School Board member

===== Eliminated in primary =====
- Larry Arata, teacher and environmental advocate
- Margo L. Davidson, state representative
- Thaddeus Kirkland, mayor of Chester
- Richard Lazer, former deputy mayor of Philadelphia
- Lindy Li, financial manager
- Ashley Lunkenheimer, former assistant U.S. attorney in the Eastern District of Pennsylvania
- Molly Sheehan, scientist
- Greg Vitali, state representative
- Theresa Wright, entrepreneur

===== Withdrawn =====
- George Badey III, attorney and nominee for this seat in 2012
- Shelly Chauncey, attorney and former CIA agent (endorsed Lunkenheimer)
- Dan Muroff, attorney
- David Wertime, journalist

==== Endorsements ====
Richard Lazer

Local officials

- Jim Kenney, mayor of Philadelphia (2016–)

Labor unions

- AFL-CIO
- International Brotherhood of Electrical Workers Local 98
- Service Employees International Union
Dan Muroff

Labor unions

- Pennsylvania Conference of Teamsters
- United Association Local 690
Mary Gay Scanlon

Governors

- Ed Rendell, former governor of Pennsylvania (2003–2011)

==== Polling ====
Poll source	Date(s) administered	Sample size	Margin of error	Margo Davidson	Thaddeus Kirkland	Rich Lazer	Lindy Li	Ashley Lunkenheimer	Mary Gay Scanlon	Molly Sheehan	Greg Vitali	Theresa Wright	Other	Undecided
Chism Strategies Advocacy & Elections	May 2018	638	±3.8	—	—	7%	—	11%	22%	—	17%	—	—	57%
Independence Communications and Consulting	April 2018	858	±3.3	—	—	7%	12%	10%	17%	7%	13%	—	7%	27%
Public Policy Polling (D-Vitali)	April 23–24, 2018	562	—	5%	4%	5%	—	6%	18%	6%	17%	8%	5%	25%

==== Forum ====
2018 Pennsylvania's 5th congressional district democratic primary candidate forum
No.	Date	Host	Moderator	Link	Democratic	Democratic	Democratic	Democratic	Democratic	Democratic	Democratic	Democratic	Democratic	Democratic	Democratic	Democratic	Democratic	Democratic
Key: P Participant A Absent N Not invited I Invited W Withdrawn																		
Key: P Participant A Absent N Not invited I Invited W Withdrawn					Larry Arata	George Badey III	Shelly Chauncey	Margo L. Davidson	Thaddeus Kirkland	Richard Lazer	Lindy Li	Ashley Lunkenheimer	Dan Muroff	Mary Gay Scanlon	Molly Sheehan	Greg Vitali	David Wertime	Theresa Wright
1	April 5, 2018				P	P	P	P	P	P	P	P	P	P	P	P	P	A
2	May 1, 2018	League of Women Voters of Central Delaware County	Jennifer Levy-Tatum	YouTube	P	W	W	P	A	A	P	P	W	P	P	P	W	P

==== Primary results ====
Democratic primary results
Party	Candidate	Votes	%
Democratic	Mary Gay Scanlon	16,804	28.4
Democratic	Ashley Lunkenheimer	9,044	15.3
Democratic	Richard Lazer	8,892	15.0
Democratic	Molly Sheehan	6,099	10.3
Democratic	Greg Vitali	5,558	9.4
Democratic	Lindy Li	4,126	7.0
Democratic	Theresa Wright	3,046	5.2
Democratic	Thaddeus Kirkland	2,327	3.9
Democratic	Margo L. Davidson	2,275	3.9
Democratic	Larry Arata	913	1.5
Total votes		59,084	100.0

=== General election ===
==== Debate ====
2018 Pennsylvania's 5th congressional district debate
No.	Date	Host	Moderator	Link	Democratic	Republican
Key: P Participant A Absent N Not invited I Invited W Withdrawn						
Key: P Participant A Absent N Not invited I Invited W Withdrawn					Mary Gay Scanlon	Pearl Kim
1	Oct. 25, 2018	League of Women Voters of Central Delaware County; Pennsylvania Cable Network	Heidi Gold	C-SPAN	P	P

==== Endorsements ====
Mary Gay Scanlon (D)

Labor unions

- AFL-CIO
- Communications Workers of America
- International Brotherhood of Boilermakers
- Service Employees International Union

Organizations

- Brady Campaign
- EMILY's List
- End Citizens United
- MoveOn

==== Predictions ====
Source	Ranking	As of
The Cook Political Report	Likely D (flip)	November 5, 2018
Inside Elections	Likely D (flip)	November 5, 2018
Sabato's Crystal Ball	Safe D (flip)	November 5, 2018
RCP	Likely D (flip)	November 5, 2018
Daily Kos	Safe D (flip)	November 5, 2018
538	Safe D (flip)	November 7, 2018
CNN	Likely D (flip)	October 31, 2018
Politico	Safe D (flip)	November 4, 2018

==== Results ====
Pennsylvania's 5th congressional district, 2018
Party	Candidate	Votes	%
Democratic	Mary Gay Scanlon	198,639	65.2
Republican	Pearl Kim	106,075	34.8
Total votes		304,714	100.0
Democratic gain from Republican			

== District 6 ==
2018 Pennsylvania's 6th congressional district election
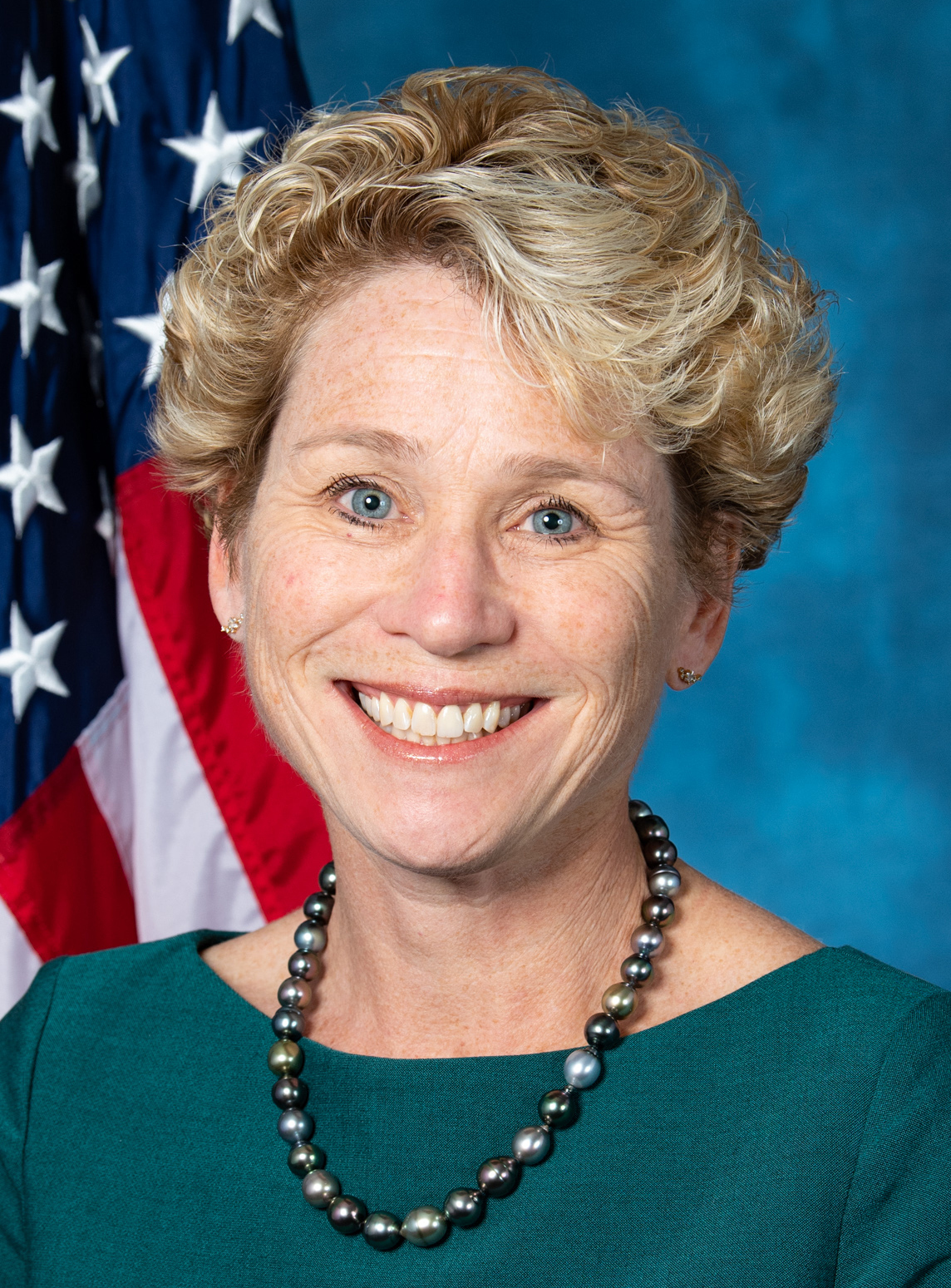

Nominee	Chrissy Houlahan	Greg McCauley
Party	Democratic	Republican
Popular vote	177,704	124,124
Percentage	58.9%	41.1%
- Houlahan: 50–60% 60–70% 70–80% 80–90% >90% McCauley: 50–60% 60–70% >90%
U.S. Representative before election
Ryan Costello
Republican
Elected U.S. Representative
Chrissy Houlahan
Democratic

The 6th district consists of Chester County and Reading. The incumbent was Republican Ryan Costello, who had represented the district since 2015. He was re-elected to a second term with 57% of the vote in 2016. On March 24, 2018, Costello announced that he would no longer seek re-election due to the growing Democratic voter demographic in the 6th district. Costello formally withdrew his name on March 27.

=== Republican primary ===
==== Candidates ====
===== Nominee =====
- Greg McCauley

===== Withdrawn =====
- Ryan Costello, incumbent U.S. representative

==== Primary results ====
Republican primary results
Party	Candidate	Votes	%
Republican	Greg McCauley	31,611	100.0
Total votes		31,611	100.0

=== Democratic primary ===
==== Candidates ====
===== Nominee =====
- Chrissy Houlahan, former United States Air Force captain, engineer and businesswoman

==== Primary results ====
Democratic primary results
Party	Candidate	Votes	%
Democratic	Chrissy Houlahan	34,947	100.0
Total votes		34,947	100.0

=== General election ===
==== Endorsements ====
Chrissy Houlahan (D)

Executive branch officials

- Joe Biden, 47th vice president of the United States (2009–2017), U.S. senator from Delaware (1973–2009)

U.S. senators

- Bob Casey Jr., U.S. senator from Pennsylvania (2007–present), 34th Treasurer of Pennsylvania (2005–2007), 49th Auditor General of Pennsylvania (1997–2005)

U.S. representatives

- Brendan Boyle, U.S. representative from Pennsylvania's 13th congressional district (2015–2019), state representative from the 170th district (2009–2015)
- Matt Cartwright, U.S. representative from Pennsylvania's 17th congressional district (2013–2019)
- Dwight Evans, U.S. representative from Pennsylvania's 2nd congressional district (2016–2019), state representative from the 203rd district
- Conor Lamb, U.S. representative from Pennsylvania's 18th congressional district (2018–2019)

State officials

- Jason Kander, 39th Missouri Secretary of State (2013–2017), host of Majority 54 and founder of Let America Vote
- Tom Wolf, 74th governor of Pennsylvania (2015–present)

Labor unions

- AFL-CIO
- American Federation of Teachers Pennsylvania
- Communications Workers of America
- International Brotherhood of Boilermakers
- Plumbers and Pipefitters Local 520
- Plumbers Local 690
- Service Employees International Union Pennsylvania State Council
- Sheet Metal Workers' Local Union No. 19

Organizations

- 314 Action
- Brady Campaign
- Democratic Congressional Campaign Committee "Red to Blue" Program
- EMILY's List
- End Citizens United
- Feminist Majority Political Action Committee
- Human Rights Campaign
- NARAL Pro-Choice America
- New Democrat Coalition
- New Politics
- Off the Sidelines
- Sierra Club
- VoteVets.org
- With Honor Fund

Local officials

- John Fetterman, mayor of Braddock (2006–2019) and Democratic nominee for lieutenant governor in 2018

==== Predictions ====
Source	Ranking	As of
The Cook Political Report	Likely D (flip)	November 5, 2018
Inside Elections	Likely D (flip)	November 5, 2018
Sabato's Crystal Ball	Safe D (flip)	November 5, 2018
RCP	Likely D (flip)	November 5, 2018
Daily Kos	Safe D (flip)	November 5, 2018
538	Safe D (flip)	November 7, 2018
CNN	Likely D (flip)	October 31, 2018
Politico	Likely D (flip)	November 4, 2018

==== Results ====
Pennsylvania's 6th congressional district, 2018
Party	Candidate	Votes	%
Democratic	Chrissy Houlahan	177,704	58.9
Republican	Greg McCauley	124,124	41.1
Total votes		301,828	100.0
Democratic gain from Republican			

== District 7 ==
2018 Pennsylvania's 7th congressional district election
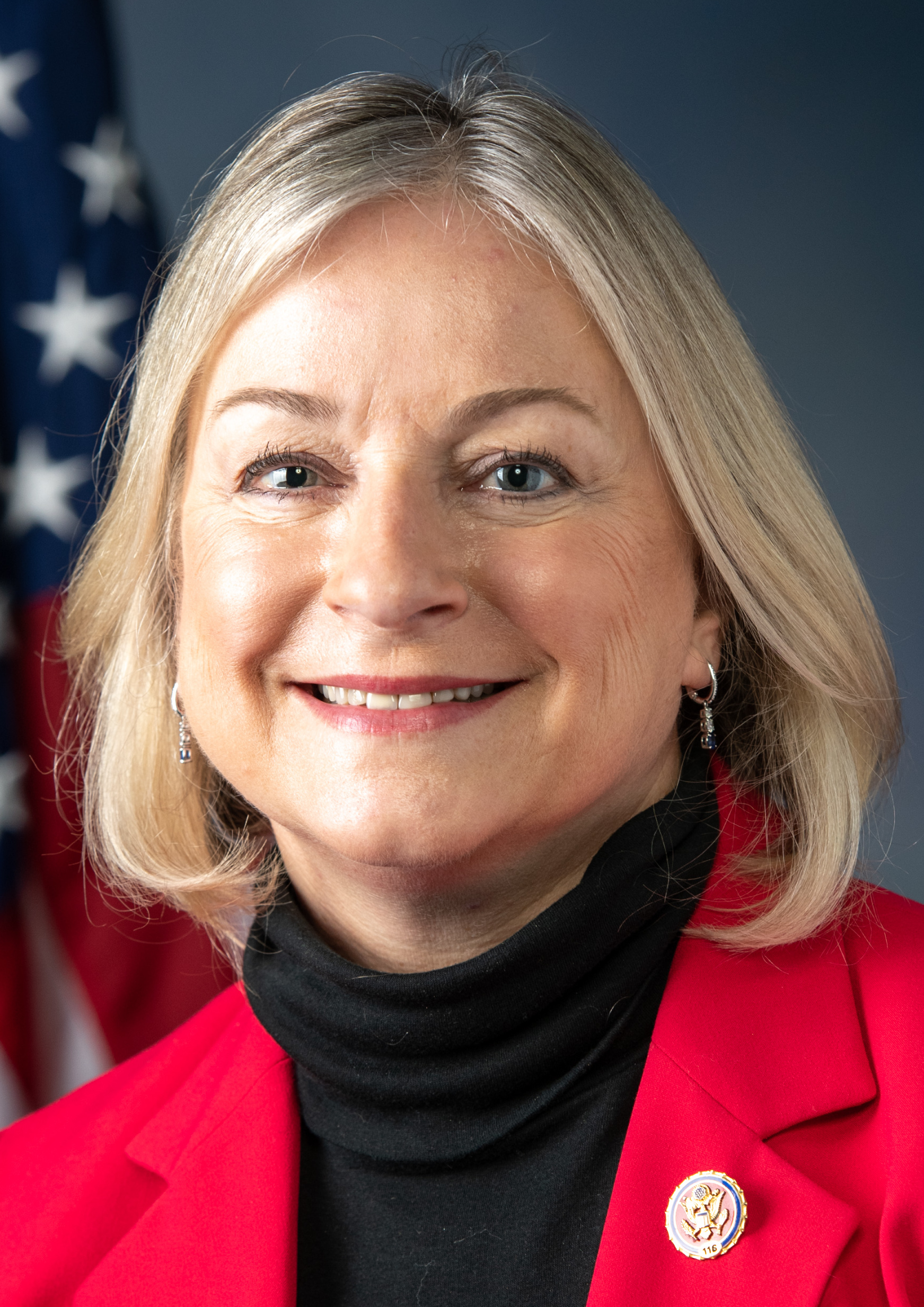

Nominee	Susan Wild	Marty Nothstein
Party	Democratic	Republican
Popular vote	140,813	114,437
Percentage	53.5%	43.5%
- Wild: 40–50% 50–60% 60–70% 70–80% 80–90% Nothstein: 40–50% 50–60% 60–70% Tie: 40–50%
U.S. Representative before election
Susan Wild (15th)
Democratic
Elected U.S. Representative
Susan Wild
Democratic

The 7th district was formerly centered on Delaware County, but the new district consisted of much of the Lehigh Valley. The new 7th district overlapped with much of the former 15th district, which was represented by retired Republican Representative Charlie Dent, who resigned early.

=== Republican primary ===
==== Candidates ====
===== Nominee =====
- Marty Nothstein, chairman of the Lehigh County Board of Commissioners

===== Eliminated in primary =====
- Dean Browning, former member of the Lehigh County Board of Commissioners

===== Withdrawn =====
- Ryan Mackenzie, state representative
- Mike Pries, Dauphin County commissioner
- Justin Simmons, state representative

==== Primary results ====
Republican primary results
Party	Candidate	Votes	%
Republican	Marty Nothstein	16,004	50.5
Republican	Dean Browning	15,696	49.5
Total votes		31,700	100.0

=== Democratic primary ===
==== Candidates ====
===== Nominee =====
- Susan Wild, former Allentown solicitor

===== Eliminated in primary =====
- David Clark, Catasauqua resident
- Rick Daugherty, former chair of the Lehigh County Democratic Party and nominee for this seat in 2012 & 2016
- Greg Edwards, pastor
- John Morganelli, Northampton County district attorney, candidate for Pennsylvania attorney general in 2000, 2004 & 2016 and nominee in 2008
- Roger Ruggles, Easton city councilmember

==== Withdrawn ====
- David Weidman, Army veteran

==== Endorsements ====
Greg Edwards

U.S. senators

- Bernie Sanders, U.S. senator from Vermont (2007–present)

Labor unions

- Service Employees International Union

Organizations

- 350 Action
- Congressional Black Caucus
- Congressional Progressive Caucus
- Justice Democrats
- Our Revolution
- Working Families Party
John Morganelli

State legislators

- Lisa Boscola, state senator
Susan Wild

U.S. representatives

- Lois Frankel, U.S. representative from Florida's 21st congressional district

Statewide officials

- Ed Rendell, former governor of Pennsylvania

Organizations

- EMILY's List
- NARAL Pro-Choice America

==== Primary results ====
Democratic primary results
Party	Candidate	Votes	%
Democratic	Susan Wild	15,001	33.3
Democratic	John Morganelli	13,565	30.1
Democratic	Greg Edwards	11,510	25.6
Democratic	Roger Ruggles	2,443	5.4
Democratic	Rick Daugherty	1,718	3.8
Democratic	David Clark	766	1.7
Total votes		45,003	100.0

=== General election ===
==== Endorsements ====
Marty Nothstein (R)

Organizations

- BIPAC
- National Republican Congressional Committee "Young Guns" Program

Local officials

- Jim Martin, Lehigh County district attorney
Susan Wild (D)

Executive branch officials

- Barack Obama, 44th president of the United States (2009–2017)

U.S. representatives

- Lois Frankel, U.S. representative from Florida's 21st congressional district

Statewide officials

- Ed Rendell, former governor of Pennsylvania

Labor unions

- AFL-CIO
- Communications Workers of America
- International Brotherhood of Boilermakers
- Service Employees International Union

Organizations

- Democratic Congressional Campaign Committee "Red to Blue" Program
- EMILY's List
- End Citizens United
- MoveOn
- NARAL Pro-Choice America
- Sierra Club

Individuals

- Tim Heidecker, comedian

==== Polling ====
Poll source	Date(s) administered	Sample size	Margin of error	Marty Nothstein (R)	Susan Wild (D)	Tim Silfies (L)	Undecided
Muhlenberg College	October 14–18, 2018	411	± 5.5%	41%	48%	5%	–
DeSales University	September 28 – October 7, 2018	405	± 4.5%	31%	50%	8%	11%
NYT Upshot/Siena College	September 21–25, 2018	539	± 4.7%	42%	50%	–	8%
Monmouth University	September 5–9, 2018	299 LV	± 5.7%	45%	47%	2%	7%
Monmouth University	September 5–9, 2018	401 RV	± 4.9%	40%	46%	3%	11%
Muhlenberg College	April 24 – May 3, 2018	408	± 5.5%	31%	42%	5%	21%

==== Predictions ====
Source	Ranking	As of
The Cook Political Report	Lean D (flip)	November 5, 2018
Inside Elections	Lean D (flip)	November 5, 2018
Sabato's Crystal Ball	Lean D (flip)	November 5, 2018
RCP	Lean D (flip)	November 5, 2018
Daily Kos	Lean D (flip)	November 5, 2018
538	Safe D (flip)	November 7, 2018
CNN	Lean D (flip)	October 31, 2018
Politico	Lean D (flip)	November 4, 2018

==== Results ====
Pennsylvania's 7th congressional district, 2018
Party	Candidate	Votes	%
Democratic	Susan Wild	140,813	53.5
Republican	Marty Nothstein	114,437	43.5
Libertarian	Tim Silfies	8,011	3.0
Total votes		263,261	100.0
Democratic gain from Republican			

== District 8 ==
2018 Pennsylvania's 8th congressional district election
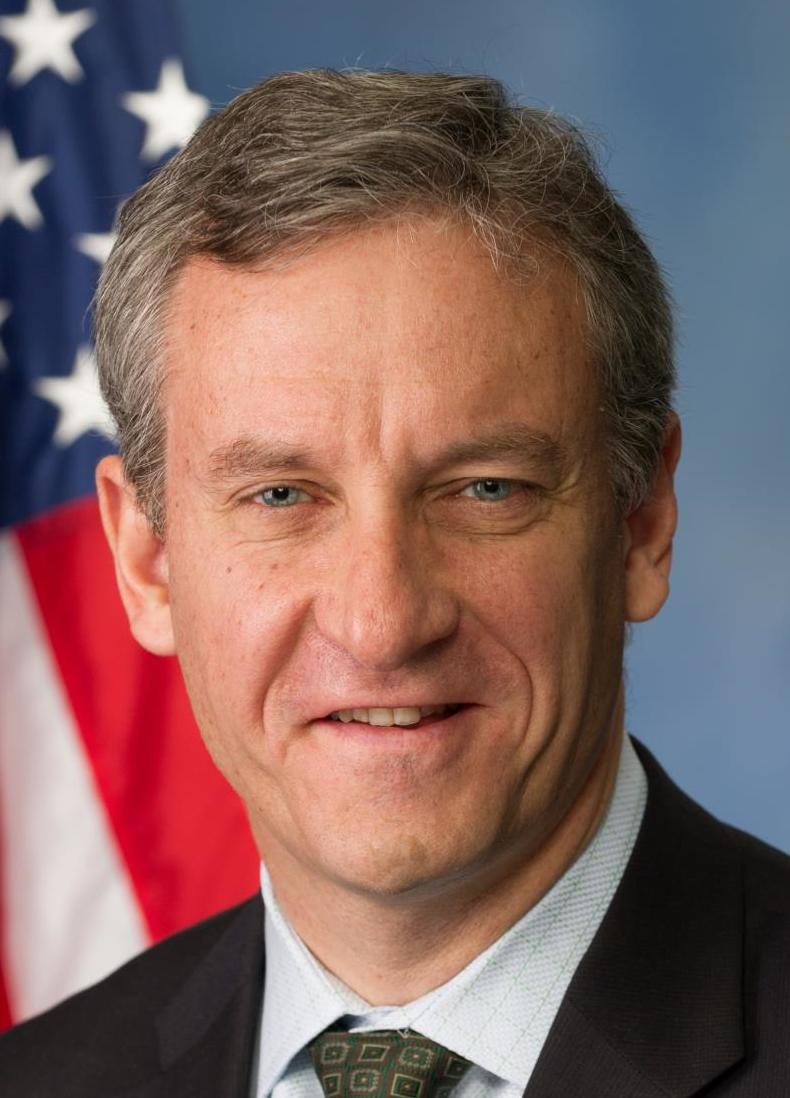

Nominee	Matt Cartwright	John Chrin
Party	Democratic	Republican
Popular vote	135,603	112,563
Percentage	54.6%	45.4%
- Cartwright: 50–60% 60–70% 70–80% 80–90% Chrin: 50–60% 60–70% 70–80%
U.S. Representative before election
Matt Cartwright (17th)
Democratic
Elected U.S. Representative
Matt Cartwright
Democratic

The 8th district was previously centered on Bucks County, but now consists of portions of Northeastern Pennsylvania, including the city of Scranton. The new district overlaps with much of the former 17th district, which was represented by Democratic Representative Matt Cartwright. Cartwright had held office since 2013.

=== Democratic primary ===
==== Candidates ====
===== Nominee =====
- Matt Cartwright, incumbent U.S. representative

==== Primary results ====
Democratic primary results
Party	Candidate	Votes	%
Democratic	Matt Cartwright (incumbent)	36,040	100.0
Total votes		36,040	100.0

=== Republican primary ===
==== Candidates ====
===== Nominee =====
- John Chrin, businessman

===== Eliminated in primary =====
- Robert Kuniegel
- Joe Peters, former federal prosecutor

==== Primary results ====
Republican primary results
Party	Candidate	Votes	%
Republican	John Chrin	15,136	48.4
Republican	Joe Peters	10,927	34.9
Republican	Robert Kuniegel	5,218	16.7
Total votes		31,281	100.0

=== General election ===
==== Endorsements ====
Matt Cartwright (D)

Labor unions

- AFL-CIO
- Communications Workers of America
- International Brotherhood of Boilermakers
- Service Employees International Union

Organizations

- Congressional Progressive Caucus
- End Citizens United
- MoveOn
- Sierra Club
John Chrin (R)

Executive branch officials

- Mike Pence, 48th vice president of the United States (2017–2021)
- Donald Trump, 45th president of the United States (2017–2021)

Organizations

- National Federation of Independent Business
- National Republican Congressional Committee "Young Guns" Program
- National Right to Life Committee
- NRA Political Victory Fund

State representatives

- Aaron Kaufer, state representative from the 120th district (2015–present)

==== Polling ====
Poll source	Date(s) administered	Sample size	Margin of error	Matt Cartwright (D)	John Chrin (R)	Other	Undecided
Susquehanna Polling & Research	October 28–29, 2018	446	± 4.6%	57%	40%	1%	2%
NYT Upshot/Siena College	October 16–19, 2018	506	± 4.7%	52%	40%	–	8%

==== Predictions ====
Source	Ranking	As of
The Cook Political Report	Likely D	November 5, 2018
Inside Elections	Lean D	November 5, 2018
Sabato's Crystal Ball	Likely D	November 5, 2018
RCP	Likely D	November 5, 2018
Daily Kos	Likely D	November 5, 2018
538	Safe D	November 7, 2018
CNN	Likely D	October 31, 2018
Politico	Likely D	November 4, 2018

==== Results ====
Pennsylvania's 8th congressional district, 2018
Party	Candidate	Votes	%
Democratic	Matt Cartwright (incumbent)	135,603	54.6
Republican	John Chrin	112,563	45.4
Total votes		248,166	100.0
Democratic hold			

== District 9 ==
2018 Pennsylvania's 9th congressional district election
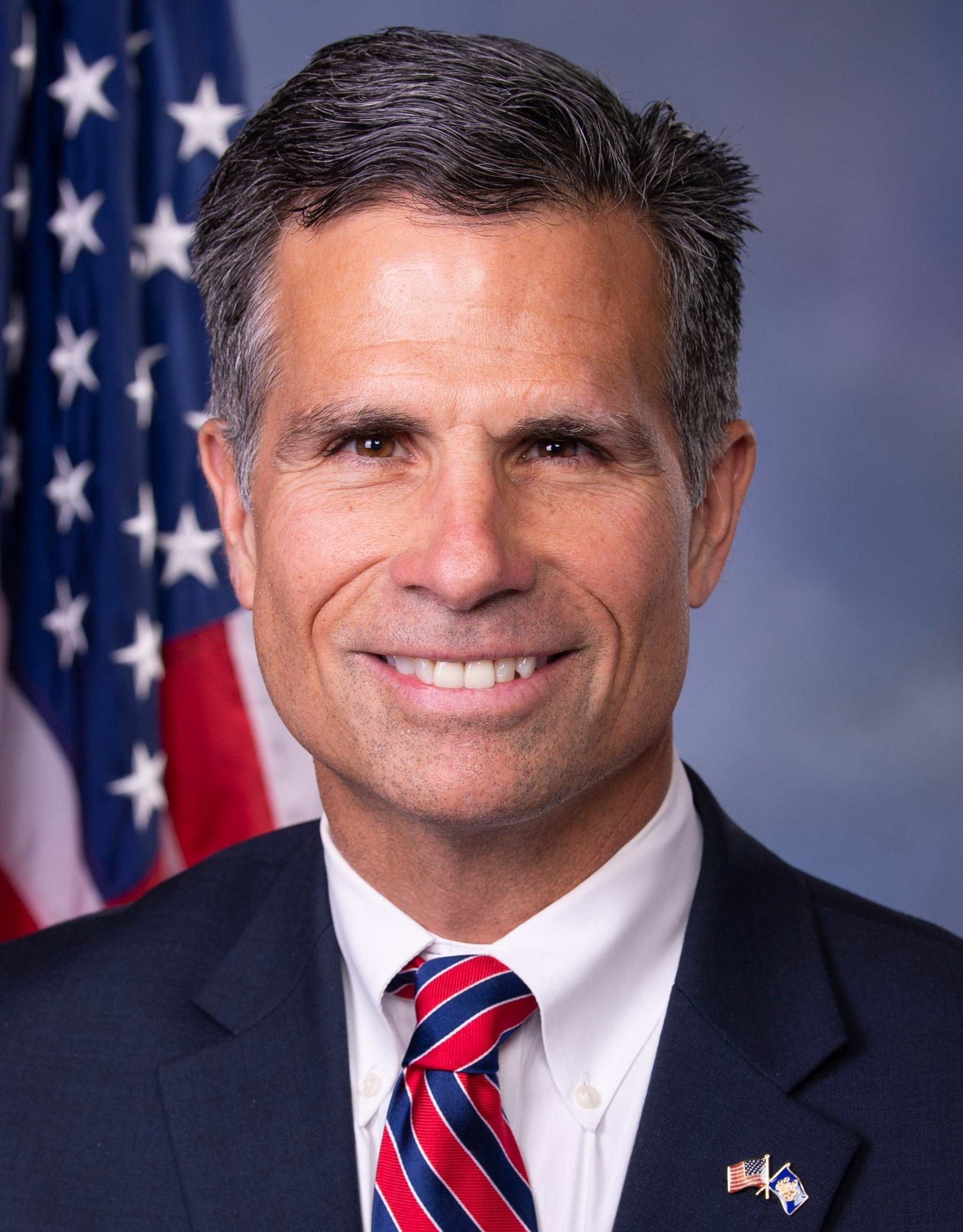

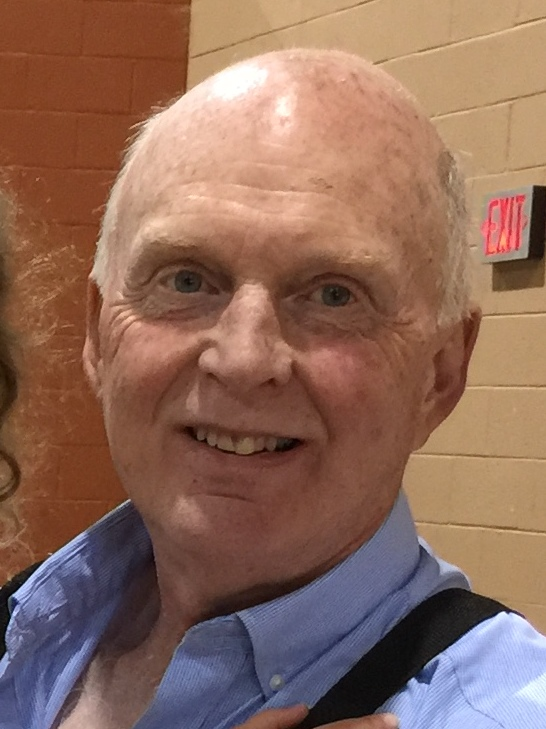
Nominee	Dan Meuser	Denny Wolff
Party	Republican	Democratic
Popular vote	148,723	100,204
Percentage	59.7%	40.3%
- Meuser: 50–60% 60–70% 70–80% 80–90% >90% Wolff: 50–60% 60–70% 70–80%
U.S. Representative before election
Lou Barletta (11th)
Republican
Elected U.S. Representative
Dan Meuser
Republican

The old 9th district was in South Central Pennsylvania, but the new 9th district is in east central Pennsylvania. The new district overlaps with the old 11th district, which was represented by retiring Republican Representative Lou Barletta.

=== Republican primary ===
==== Candidates ====
===== Nominee =====
- Dan Meuser, former Secretary of Revenue of Pennsylvania

===== Eliminated in primary =====
- George Halcovage Jr.
- Scott Uehlinger, delegate to the 2016 Republican National Convention

==== Primary results ====
Republican primary results
Party	Candidate	Votes	%
Republican	Dan Meuser	26,568	53.0
Republican	George Halcovage Jr.	12,032	24.0
Republican	Scott Uehlinger	11,541	23.0
Total votes		50,141	100.0

=== Democratic primary ===
==== Candidates ====
===== Nominee =====
- Denny Wolff, former Secretary of Agriculture of Pennsylvania

===== Eliminated in primary =====
- Laura Quick, delivery driver
- Gary Wegman, dentist

==== Endorsements ====
Laura Quick

Labor unions

- AFL-CIO

==== Primary results ====
Democratic primary results
Party	Candidate	Votes	%
Democratic	Denny Wolff	11,020	40.7
Democratic	Gary Wegman	8,450	31.2
Democratic	Laura Quick	7,616	28.1
Total votes		27,086	100.0

=== General election ===
==== Predictions ====
Source	Ranking	As of
The Cook Political Report	Safe R	November 5, 2018
Inside Elections	Safe R	November 5, 2018
Sabato's Crystal Ball	Safe R	November 5, 2018
RCP	Safe R	November 5, 2018
Daily Kos	Safe R	November 5, 2018
538	Safe R	November 7, 2018
CNN	Safe R	October 31, 2018
Politico	Safe R	November 4, 2018

==== Debate ====
2018 Pennsylvania's 9th congressional district debate
No.	Date	Host	Moderator	Link	Republican	Democratic
Key: P Participant A Absent N Not invited I Invited W Withdrawn						
Key: P Participant A Absent N Not invited I Invited W Withdrawn					Dan Meuser	Denny Wolff
1	Oct. 30, 2018	WVIA-TV	Larry Vojtko	YouTube	P	P

==== Endorsements ====
Denny Wolff (D)

Labor unions

- AFL-CIO
- Communications Workers of America
- International Brotherhood of Boilermakers
- Service Employees International Union

==== Polling ====
Poll source	Date(s) administered	Sample size	Margin of error	Dan Meuser (R)	Denny Wolff (D)	Other	Undecided
Susquehanna Polling and Research	October 23–25, 2018	271	± 5.9%	57%	36%	1%	6%

==== Results ====
Pennsylvania's 9th congressional district, 2018
Party	Candidate	Votes	%
Republican	Dan Meuser	148,723	59.7
Democratic	Denny Wolff	100,204	40.3
Total votes		248,927	100.0
Republican hold			

== District 10 ==
2018 Pennsylvania's 10th congressional district election
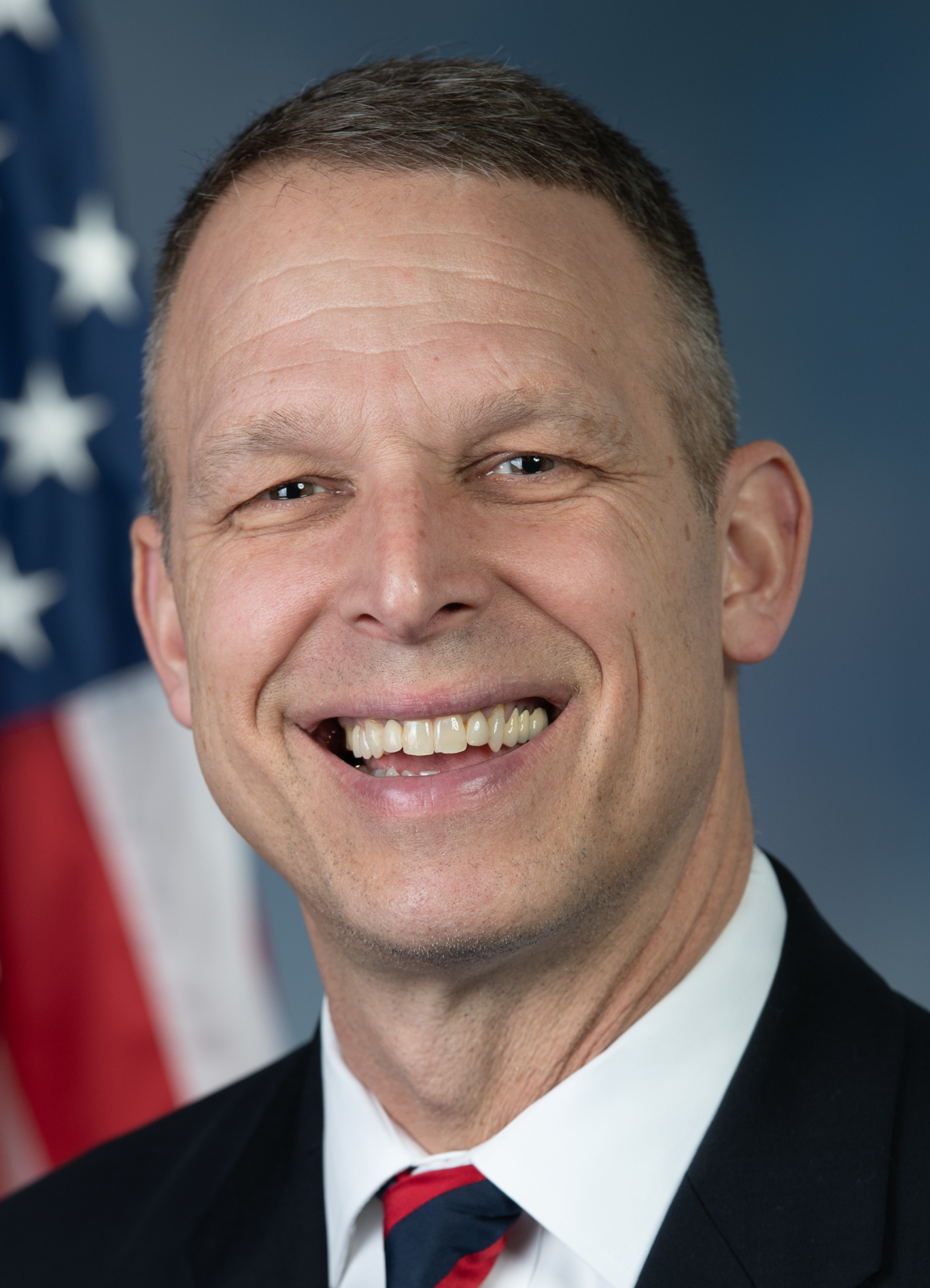

Nominee	Scott Perry	George Scott
Party	Republican	Democratic
Popular vote	149,365	141,668
Percentage	51.3%	48.7%
- Perry: 40–50% 50–60% 60–70% 70–80% 80–90% >90% Scott: 50–60% 60–70% 70–80% 80–90% >90%
U.S. Representative before election
Scott Perry (4th)
Republican
Elected U.S. Representative
Scott Perry
Republican

The 10th district was previously in Northeastern Pennsylvania, but it now overlaps with much of the former 4th district in South Central Pennsylvania. Under the map released in 2018, the 10th district includes Harrisburg and a portion of York County. The incumbent from the 4th district was Republican Scott Perry, who had represented his district since 2013. He was re-elected to a third term with 66% of the vote in 2016. Several Democrats sought to challenge Perry in 2018, with George Scott, a 20-year Army veteran and Lutheran pastor, receiving the party's nomination.

=== Republican primary ===
==== Candidates ====
===== Nominee =====
- Scott Perry, incumbent U.S. representative

==== Primary results ====
Republican primary results
Party	Candidate	Votes	%
Republican	Scott Perry (incumbent)	57,407	100.0
Total votes		57,407	100.0

=== Democratic primary ===
==== Candidates ====
===== Nominee =====
- George Scott, Lutheran pastor and former Army Lieutenant Colonel

===== Eliminated in primary =====
- Shavonnia Corbin-Johnson, former assistant to the director for the Office of Management and Budget
- Eric Ding, public health scientist
- Alan Howe, Air Force veteran

===== Withdrawn =====
- Christina Hartman, former nonprofit executive and nominee for Pennsylvania's 16th congressional district in 2016

==== Primary results ====
Democratic primary results
Party	Candidate	Votes	%
Democratic	George Scott	13,924	36.3
Democratic	Shavonnia Corbin-Johnson	13,376	34.9
Democratic	Eric Ding	6,912	18.0
Democratic	Alan Howe	4,157	10.8
Total votes		38,369	100.0

=== General election ===
==== Endorsements ====
Scott Perry (R)

Executive branch officials

- Donald Trump, 45th president of the United States (2017–2021)

Organizations

- Club for Growth
George Scott (D)

Labor unions

- AFL-CIO
- Communications Workers of America
- International Brotherhood of Boilermakers
- Service Employees International Union

Organizations

- Democratic Congressional Campaign Committee "Red to Blue" Program
- End Citizens United
- Indivisible
- Sierra Club
- With Honor Fund

==== Debates ====
2018 Pennsylvania's 10th congressional district debates
No.	Date	Host	Moderator	Link	Republican	Democratic
Key: P Participant A Absent N Not invited I Invited W Withdrawn						
Key: P Participant A Absent N Not invited I Invited W Withdrawn					Scott Perry	George Scott
1	September 17, 2018	Rotary Club of York			P	P
2	October 18, 2018	American Association of University Women; WGAL-TV	Janelle Stelson; Mike Straub		P	P

==== Polling ====
Poll source	Date(s) administered	Sample size	Margin of error	Scott Perry (R)	George Scott (D)	Other	Undecided
NYT Upshot/Siena College	October 23–26, 2018	498	± 4.7%	45%	43%	–	12%
Susquehanna Polling and Research	October 19–21, 2018	366	± 5.2%	49%	46%	1%	4%
Public Policy Polling (D)	September 24–25, 2018	650	–	44%	43%	–	12%
Public Policy Polling (D-Scott)	June 8–10, 2018	654	± 4.1%	45%	41%	–	14%

==== Predictions ====
Source	Ranking	As of
The Cook Political Report	Tossup	November 5, 2018
Inside Elections	Lean R	November 5, 2018
Sabato's Crystal Ball	Lean R	November 5, 2018
RCP	Tossup	November 5, 2018
Daily Kos	Lean R	November 5, 2018
538	Lean R	November 7, 2018
CNN	Lean R	October 31, 2018
Politico	Lean R	November 4, 2018

==== Results ====
Pennsylvania's 10th congressional district, 2018
Party	Candidate	Votes	%
Republican	Scott Perry (incumbent)	149,365	51.3
Democratic	George Scott	141,668	48.7
Total votes		291,033	100.0
Republican hold			

== District 11 ==
2018 Pennsylvania's 11th congressional district election
- November 6, 2018
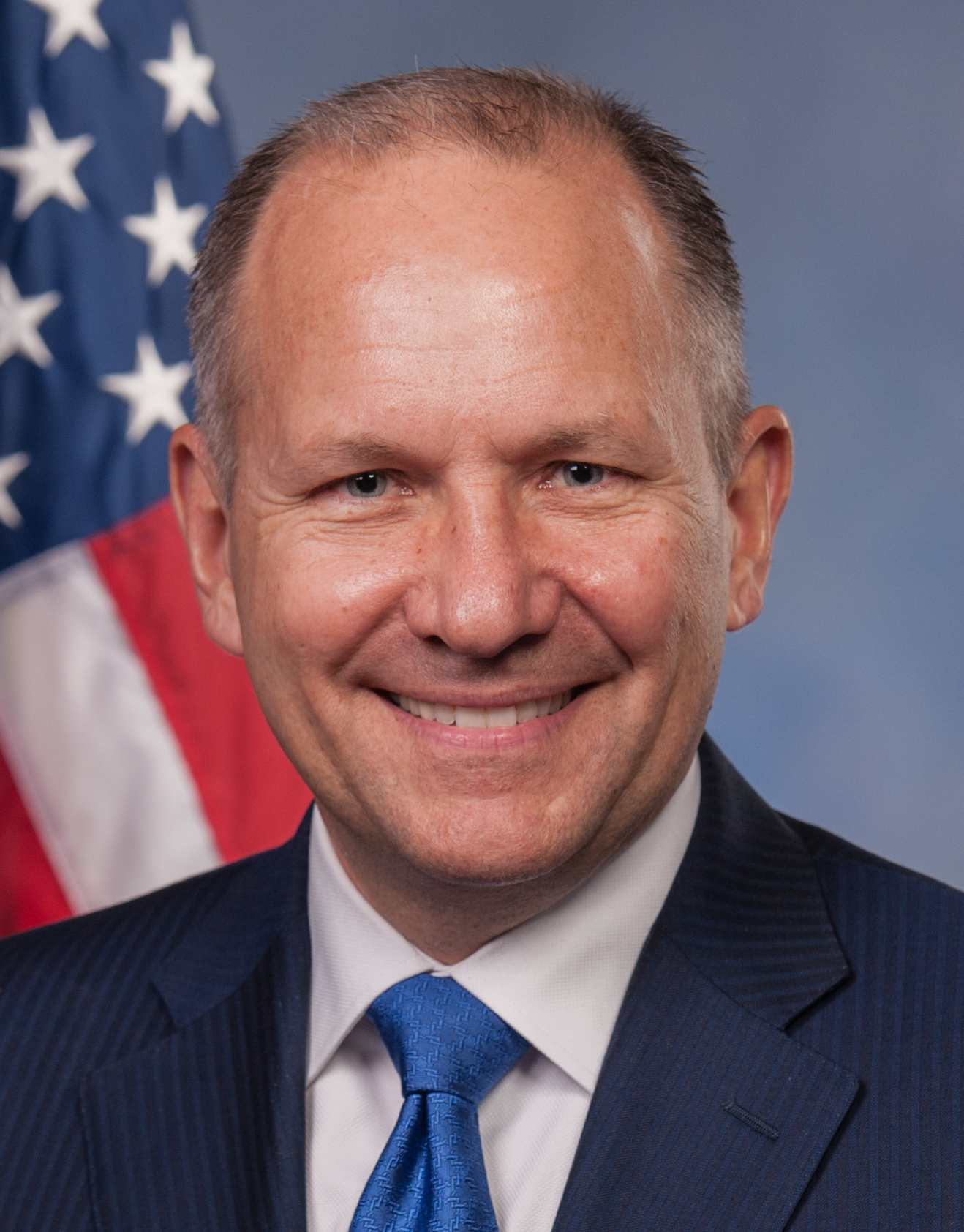

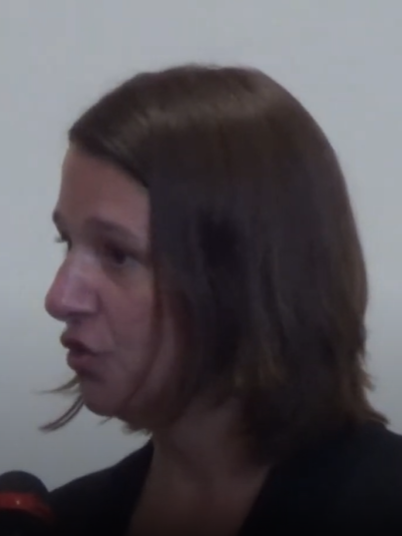
Nominee	Lloyd Smucker	Jess King
Party	Republican	Democratic
Popular vote	162,835	114,831
Percentage	58.6%	41.4%
- Smucker: 50–60% 60–70% 70–80% 80–90% King: 50–60% 60–70% 70–80% 80–90% >90% Tie: 50%
U.S. Representative before election
Lloyd Smucker (16th)
Republican
Elected U.S. Representative
Lloyd Smucker
Republican

The old 11th district was in Northeastern Pennsylvania, but the district now overlaps with much of the former 16th district in South Central Pennsylvania. The new district consists of Lancaster County and portions of York County. The incumbent from the former 16th district was Republican Lloyd Smucker, who had held office since 2017.

=== Republican primary ===
==== Candidates ====
===== Nominee =====
- Lloyd Smucker, incumbent U.S. representative

==== Primary results ====
Republican primary results
Party	Candidate	Votes	%
Republican	Lloyd Smucker (incumbent)	34,002	58.6
Republican	Chet Beiler	24,063	41.4
Total votes		58,065	100.0

=== Democratic primary ===
Christina Hartman, a former nonprofit executive who lost against Smucker in 16th had filed for a rematch; however, following the court-ordered redrawing, she considered switching to run in the more competitive 10th before withdrawing from the race altogether.

==== Candidates ====
===== Nominee =====
- Jess King, nonprofit director

===== Withdrawn =====
- John George, former Warwick superintendent
- Christina Hartman, former nonprofit executive and nominee for this seat in 2016
- Charles Klein, pharmacist and candidate for state representative in 2016

==== Endorsements ====
Christina Hartman (withdrawn)

State legislators

- Mike Sturla, state representative

Statewide officials

- Katie McGinty, former chief of staff to Governor Tom Wolf, former secretary of the Pennsylvania Department of Environmental Protection, candidate for the governorship in 2014 and nominee for Senate in 2016
- Ed Rendell, former governor of Pennsylvania

Organizations

- EMILY's List
- End Citizens United
Jess King

State legislators

- Tom Houghton, former state representative and nominee for PA-16 seat in 2014

Labor unions

- Service Employees International Union

Organizations

- 350 Action
- Democracy for America
- Justice Democrats

Local officials

- Bill Peduto, mayor of Pittsburgh

==== Primary results ====
Democratic primary results
Party	Candidate	Votes	%
Democratic	Jess King	22,794	100.0
Total votes		22,794	100.0

=== General election ===
Meteorologist Drew Anderson planned to run without party affiliation and expected to be listed that way on the November ballot. However, he failed to file papers in time, and was not in the race.

==== Debate ====
2018 Pennsylvania's 11th congressional district debate
No.	Date	Host	Moderator	Link	Republican	Democratic
Key: P Participant A Absent N Not invited I Invited W Withdrawn						
Key: P Participant A Absent N Not invited I Invited W Withdrawn					Lloyd Smucker	Jess King
1	Oct. 30, 2018	Eastern York School District; WGAL; York County Economic Alliance	Janelle Stelson; Mike Straub		P	P

==== Endorsements ====
Jess King (D)

U.S. senators

- Bernie Sanders, U.S. senator from Vermont (2007–present)

Labor unions

- AFL-CIO
- Communications Workers of America
- International Brotherhood of Boilermakers
- Service Employees International Union

Organizations

- Climate Hawks Vote
- End Citizens United
- Indivisible
- Justice Democrats
- MoveOn
- Our Revolution
- Peace Action
- Sierra Club
- Sunrise Movement
- Working Families Party

==== Polling ====
Poll source	Date(s) administered	Sample size	Margin of error	Lloyd Smucker (R)	Jess King (D)	Other	Undecided
Susquehanna Polling and Research	October 21–22, 2018	311	± 5.6%	50%	46%	1%	3%
Public Policy Polling (D-King)	September 12–13, 2018	552	± 4.2%	44%	35%	–	21%

==== Predictions ====
Source	Ranking	As of
The Cook Political Report	Safe R	November 5, 2018
Inside Elections	Safe R	November 5, 2018
Sabato's Crystal Ball	Safe R	November 5, 2018
RCP	Safe R	November 5, 2018
Daily Kos	Safe R	November 5, 2018
538	Likely R	November 7, 2018
CNN	Safe R	October 31, 2018
Politico	Safe R	November 4, 2018

==== Results ====
Pennsylvania's 11th congressional district, 2018
Party	Candidate	Votes	%
Republican	Lloyd Smucker (incumbent)	163,708	59.0
Democratic	Jess King	113,876	41.0
Total votes		277,584	100.0
Republican hold			

== District 12 ==
Pennsylvania's 12th congressional district, 2018
- November 6, 2018
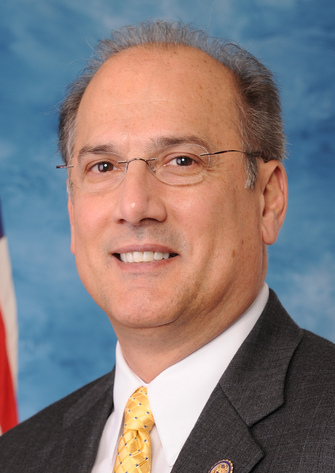

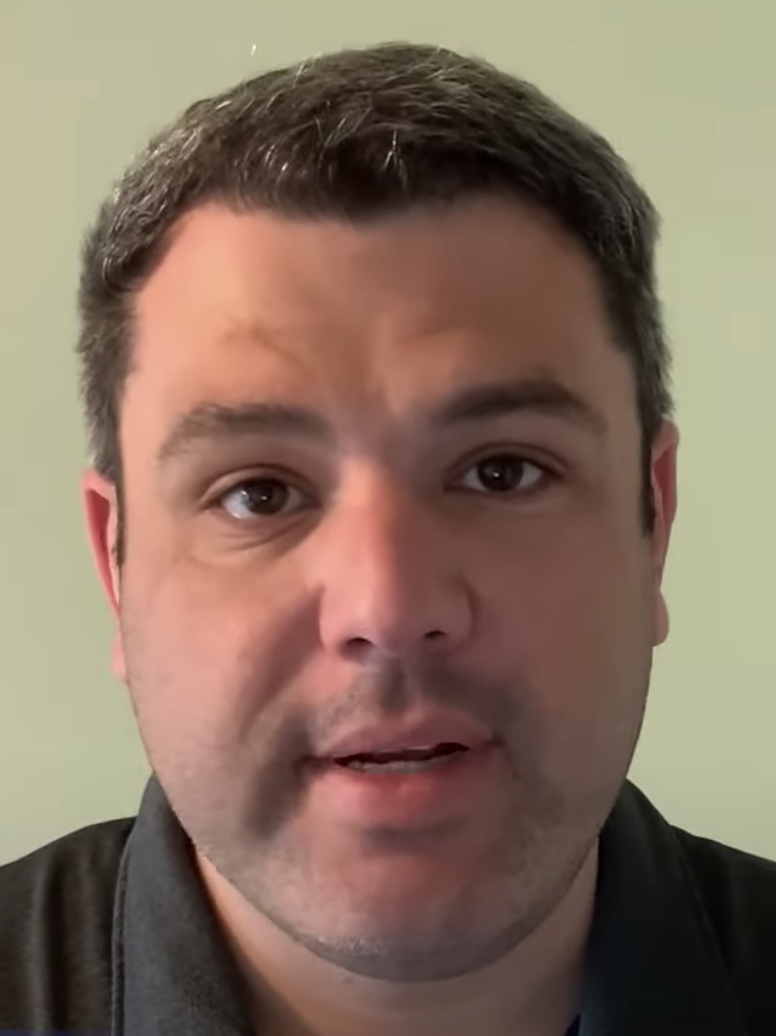
Nominee	Tom Marino	Marc Friedenburg
Party	Republican	Democratic
Popular vote	160,193	82,122
Percentage	66.1%	33.9%
- Marino: 50–60% 60–70% 70–80% 80–90% >90% Friedenburg: 50–60% 60–70% 70–80% 80–90%
U.S. Representative before election
Tom Marino (10th)
Republican
Elected U.S. Representative
Tom Marino
Republican

The old 12th district was in Southwestern Pennsylvania, but the new district is in North Central Pennsylvania. It overlaps with the former 10th district, which was represented by Republican Tom Marino. Marino had held office since 2011.

=== Republican primary ===
==== Candidates ====
===== Nominee =====
- Tom Marino, incumbent U.S. representative

===== Eliminated in primary =====
- Douglas McLinko

==== Primary results ====
Republican primary results
Party	Candidate	Votes	%
Republican	Tom Marino (incumbent)	39,537	67.0
Republican	Douglas McLinko	19,435	33.0
Total votes		58,972	100.0

=== Democratic primary ===
==== Candidates ====
===== Nominee =====
- Marc Friedenburg, teacher

===== Eliminated in primary =====
- Judith Herschel, certified drug and alcohol counselor

==== Primary results ====
Democratic primary results
Party	Candidate	Votes	%
Democratic	Marc Friedenburg	12,713	50.6
Democratic	Judith Herschel	12,407	49.4
Total votes		25,120	100.0

=== General election ===
==== Predictions ====
Source	Ranking	As of
The Cook Political Report	Safe R	November 5, 2018
Inside Elections	Safe R	November 5, 2018
Sabato's Crystal Ball	Safe R	November 5, 2018
RCP	Safe R	November 5, 2018
Daily Kos	Safe R	November 5, 2018
538	Safe R	November 7, 2018
CNN	Safe R	October 31, 2018
Politico	Safe R	November 4, 2018

==== Endorsements ====
Marc Friedenburg (D)

Labor unions

- AFL-CIO
- Communications Workers of America
- International Brotherhood of Boilermakers

==== Results ====
Pennsylvania's 12th congressional district, 2018
Party	Candidate	Votes	%
Republican	Tom Marino (incumbent)	161,047	66.0
Democratic	Marc Friedenburg	82,825	34.0
Total votes		243,872	100.0
Republican hold			

== District 13 ==
2018 Pennsylvania's 13th congressional district election
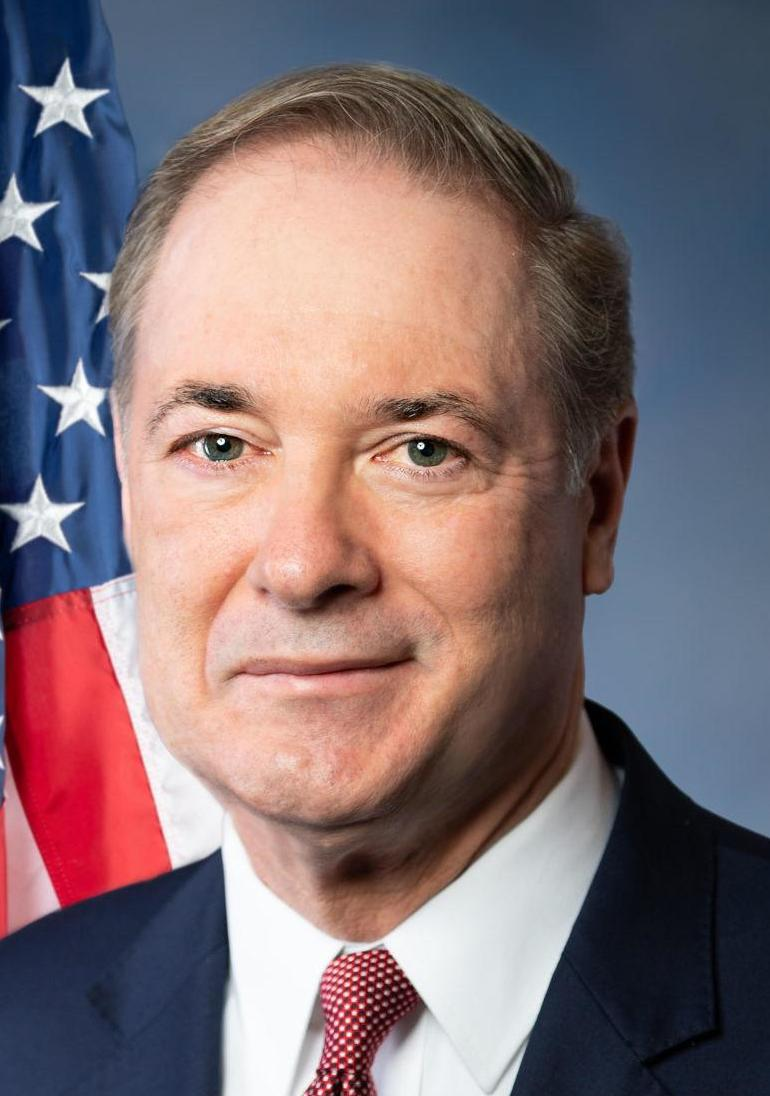

Nominee	John Joyce	Brent Ottaway
Party	Republican	Democratic
Popular vote	178,533	74,733
Percentage	70.5%	29.5%
- Joyce: 50–60% 60–70% 70–80% 80–90% >90% Ottaway: 50–60% 60–70% 70–80% 80–90% Tie: 40–50% No votes
U.S. representative before election
Bill Shuster (9th)
Republican
Elected U.S. representative
John Joyce
Republican

The old 13th district was in Southeastern Pennsylvania, but the new district is in Western Pennsylvania. The new district overlaps with much of the old 9th district, which was represented by retiring Republican Representative Bill Shuster.

=== Republican primary ===
==== Candidates ====
===== Nominee =====
- John Joyce, physician

===== Eliminated in primary =====
- Stephen Bloom, state representative
- John Eichelberger, state senator
- Art Halvorson, businessman, Coast Guard veteran and candidate for this seat in 2014 & 2016
- Benjamin Hornberger, laborer and former Marine
- Doug Mastriano, retired Army colonel
- Travis Schooley, businessman and candidate for this seat in 2012 & 2014
- Bernard Washabaugh II

===== Declined =====
- Bill Shuster, incumbent U.S. representative

==== Primary results ====
Results by county: Joyce: 20–30%; 30–40%; Eichelberger: 20–30%; 40–50%; Bloom: 40–50%; 70–80%; Mastriano: 30–40%; Halvorson: 30–40%

Republican primary results
Party	Candidate	Votes	%
Republican	John Joyce	14,615	21.9
Republican	John Eichelberger	13,101	19.6
Republican	Stephen Bloom	12,195	18.3
Republican	Doug Mastriano	10,485	15.7
Republican	Art Halvorson	10,161	15.2
Republican	Travis Schooley	3,030	4.5
Republican	Bernie Washabaugh	1,908	2.9
Republican	Ben Hornberger	1,182	1.8
Total votes		66,677	100.0

=== Democratic primary ===
==== Candidates ====
===== Nominee =====
- Brent Ottaway

==== Primary results ====
Democratic primary results
Party	Candidate	Votes	%
Democratic	Brent Ottaway	21,096	100.0
Total votes		1,096	100.0

=== General election ===
==== Predictions ====
Source	Ranking	As of
The Cook Political Report	Safe R	November 5, 2018
Inside Elections	Safe R	November 5, 2018
Sabato's Crystal Ball	Safe R	November 5, 2018
RCP	Safe R	November 5, 2018
Daily Kos	Safe R	November 5, 2018
538	Safe R	November 7, 2018
CNN	Safe R	October 31, 2018
Politico	Safe R	November 4, 2018

==== Endorsements ====
Brent Ottaway (D)

Labor unions

- AFL-CIO
- Communications Workers of America
- International Brotherhood of Boilermakers

==== Polling ====
Poll source	Date(s) administered	Sample size	Margin of error	John Joyce (R)	Brent Ottaway (D)	Other	Undecided
Susquehanna Polling and Research	October 25–26, 2018	303	± 5.6%	57%	36%	2%	5%

==== Results ====
Pennsylvania's 13th congressional district, 2018
Party	Candidate	Votes	%
Republican	John Joyce	178,533	70.5
Democratic	Brent Ottaway	74,733	29.5
Total votes		253,266	100.0
Republican hold			

== District 14 ==
2018 Pennsylvania's 14th congressional district election
- November 6, 2018
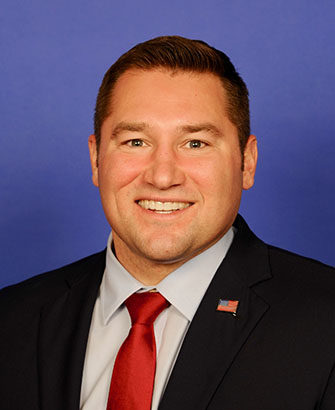

Nominee	Guy Reschenthaler	Bibiana Boerio
Party	Republican	Democratic
Popular vote	149,147	108,179
Percentage	58.0%	42.0%
- Reschenthaler: 50–60% 60–70% 70–80% 80–90% Boerio: 50–60% 60–70% 70–80% 80–90% Tie: 40–50% 50% No votes
U.S. Representative before election
Conor Lamb (18th)
Democratic
Elected U.S. Representative
Guy Reschenthaler
Republican

The old 14th district consisted of the city of Pittsburgh and parts of surrounding suburbs, but the new district consists of suburbs to the south and west of Pittsburgh. The district overlaps with much of the former 18th district. The winner of the 2018 special election, Democrat Conor Lamb, ran in the more competitive 17th district.

=== Democratic primary ===
==== Candidates ====
===== Nominee =====
- Bibiana Boerio, businesswoman and chief of staff to former representative Joe Sestak

===== Eliminated in primary =====
- Tom Prigg
- Adam Sedlock, psychologist
- Bob Solomon, physician and candidate for this seat in 2018

===== Declined =====
- Conor Lamb, incumbent U.S. representative (running in the 17th)

==== Primary results ====
Democratic primary results
Party	Candidate	Votes	%
Democratic	Bibiana Boerio	17,755	43.0
Democratic	Adam Sedlock	9,944	24.1
Democratic	Bob Solomon	7,831	19.0
Democratic	Tom Prigg	5,724	13.9
Total votes		41,254	100.0

=== Republican primary ===
==== Candidates ====
===== Nominee =====
- Guy Reschenthaler, state senator and candidate for this seat in 2018

===== Eliminated in primary =====
- Rick Saccone, state representative and nominee for this seat in 2018

==== Primary results ====
Republican primary results
Party	Candidate	Votes	%
Republican	Guy Reschenthaler	23,245	55.4
Republican	Rick Saccone	18,734	44.6
Total votes		41,979	100.0

=== General election ===
==== Endorsements ====
Bibiana Boerio (D)

Labor unions

- AFL-CIO
- Communications Workers of America

Organizations

- Sierra Club
Guy Reschenthaler (R)

Labor unions

- International Brotherhood of Boilermakers

==== Predictions ====
Source	Ranking	As of
The Cook Political Report	Likely R (flip)	November 5, 2018
Inside Elections	Likely R (flip)	November 5, 2018
Sabato's Crystal Ball	Safe R (flip)	November 5, 2018
RCP	Likely R (flip)	November 5, 2018
Daily Kos	Safe R (flip)	November 5, 2018
538	Safe R (flip)	November 7, 2018
CNN	Safe R (flip)	October 31, 2018
Politico	Safe R (flip)	November 4, 2018

==== Results ====
Pennsylvania's 14th congressional district, 2018
Party	Candidate	Votes	%
Republican	Guy Reschenthaler	151,386	57.9
Democratic	Bibiana Boerio	110,051	42.1
Total votes		261,437	100.0
Republican gain from Democratic			

== District 15 ==
2018 Pennsylvania's 15th congressional district election
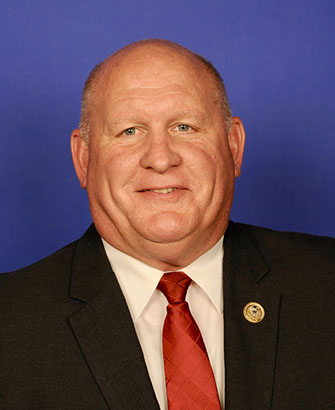

Nominee	Glenn Thompson	Susan Boser
Party	Republican	Democratic
Popular vote	165,245	78,327
Percentage	67.8%	32.2%
- Thompson: 40–50% 50–60% 60–70% 70–80% 80–90% >90% Boser: 50–60% 60–70% 70–80% Tie: 50%
U.S. representative before election
Glenn Thompson (5th)
Republican
Elected U.S. representative
Glenn Thompson
Republican

The old 15th district was in Eastern Pennsylvania, but the new district is in Western Pennsylvania. The new district overlaps with much of the former 5th district, which was represented by Republican G.T. Thompson. Thompson had held office since 2009.

=== Republican primary ===
==== Candidates ====
===== Nominee =====
- G.T. Thompson, incumbent U.S. representative

===== Declined =====
- Dave Reed, majority leader of the Pennsylvania House of Representatives

===== Withdrew =====
- Ryan Mackenzie, member of the Pennsylvania House of Representatives for the 134th district; withdrew in March following redistricting

==== Primary results ====
Republican primary results
Party	Candidate	Votes	%
Republican	G.T. Thompson (incumbent)	44,893	100.0
Total votes		44,893	100.0

=== Democratic primary ===
==== Candidates ====
===== Nominee =====
- Susan Boser, teacher

===== Eliminated in primary =====
- Wade Jodun

==== Primary results ====
Democratic primary results
Party	Candidate	Votes	%
Democratic	Susan Boser	20,135	74.5
Democratic	Wade Jodun	6,902	25.5
Total votes		27,037	100.0

=== General election ===
==== Predictions ====
Source	Ranking	As of
The Cook Political Report	Safe R	November 5, 2018
Inside Elections	Safe R	November 5, 2018
Sabato's Crystal Ball	Safe R	November 5, 2018
RCP	Safe R	November 5, 2018
Daily Kos	Safe R	November 5, 2018
538	Safe R	November 7, 2018
CNN	Safe R	October 31, 2018
Politico	Safe R	November 4, 2018

==== Endorsements ====
Susan Boser (D)

Labor unions

- AFL-CIO
- Communications Workers of America
- International Brotherhood of Boilermakers

Organizations

- Indivisible

==== Results ====
Pennsylvania's 15th congressional district, 2018
Party	Candidate	Votes	%
Republican	G.T. Thompson (incumbent)	165,245	67.8
Democratic	Susan Boser	78,327	32.2
Total votes		243,572	100.0
Republican hold			

== District 16 ==
2018 Pennsylvania's 16th congressional district election
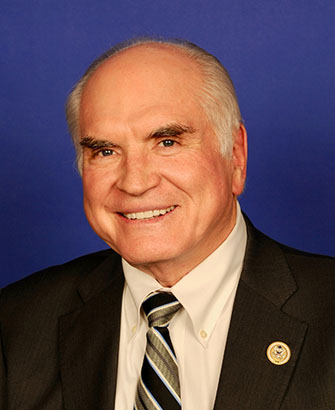

Nominee	Mike Kelly	Ronald DiNicola
Party	Republican	Democratic
Popular vote	135,348	124,109
Percentage	51.5%	47.3%
- Kelly: 40–50% 50–60% 60–70% 70–80% 80–90% >90% DiNicola: 40–50% 50–60% 60–70% 70–80% 80–90% >90% Tie: 40–50%
U.S. representative before election
Mike Kelly (3rd)
Republican
Elected U.S. representative
Mike Kelly
Republican

The former 16th district was in Southeastern Pennsylvania, but the redrawn 16th district is in Northwestern Pennsylvania, overlapping with the former 3rd district. The incumbent from the 3rd district was Republican Mike Kelly, who had represented the district since 2011. He was re-elected to a fourth term unopposed in 2016. Kelly had considered running for the U.S. Senate, but announced he would run for re-election instead.

=== Republican primary ===
==== Candidates ====
===== Nominee =====
- Mike Kelly, incumbent U.S. representative

==== Primary results ====
Republican primary results
Party	Candidate	Votes	%
Republican	Mike Kelly (incumbent)	39,412	98.7
Write-in		525	1.3
Total votes		39,937	100.0

=== Democratic primary ===
==== Candidates ====
===== Nominee =====
- Ron DiNicola, U.S. Marine veteran, Erie County solicitor, nominee for Pennsylvania's 21st congressional district in 1996

===== Eliminated in primary =====
- Robert Multari, physician
- Chris Rieger, attorney

==== Endorsements ====
Ron DiNicola

Labor unions

- Service Employees International Union

==== Debate ====
2018 Pennsylvania's 16th congressional district Democratic primary debate
No.	Date	Host	Moderator	Link	Democratic	Democratic	Democratic
Key: P Participant A Absent N Not invited I Invited W Withdrawn							
Key: P Participant A Absent N Not invited I Invited W Withdrawn					Ron DiNicola	Robert Multari	Chris Rieger
1	April 16, 2018	Allegheny College Center for Political Participation; The Meadville Tribune	Rick Green; Keith Gushard; Marley Parish		P	P	P

==== Primary results ====
Democratic primary results
Party	Candidate	Votes	%
Democratic	Ron DiNicola	23,480	59.7
Democratic	Chris Rieger	9,758	24.8
Democratic	Robert Multari	5,914	15.0
Write-in		172	0.4
Total votes		39,324	100.0

=== General election ===
==== Endorsements ====
Ron DiNicola (D)

Newspapers

- Erie Times-News

Labor unions

- AFL-CIO
- Communications Workers of America
- International Brotherhood of Boilermakers
- Service Employees International Union

Organizations

- Democratic Congressional Campaign Committee "Red to Blue" Program
- End Citizens United
- Human Rights Campaign
- National Committee to Preserve Social Security and Medicare
- Sierra Club

==== Debate ====
2018 Pennsylvania's 16th congressional district debate
No.	Date	Host	Moderator	Link	Republican	Democratic
Key: P Participant A Absent N Not invited I Invited W Withdrawn						
Key: P Participant A Absent N Not invited I Invited W Withdrawn					Mike Kelly	Ron DiNicola
1	October 8, 2018	Mercyhurst University; WKBN-TV	Sean Lafferty		P	P

==== Polling ====
Poll source	Date(s) administered	Sample size	Margin of error	Mike Kelly (R)	Ron DiNicola (D)	Other	Undecided
Susquehanna Polling & Research	October 29–30, 2018	405	± 4.9%	47%	51%	1%	1%
DCCC (D)	October 9–10, 2018	548	± 4.2%	49%	46%	–	5%
NYT Upshot/Siena College	October 5–8, 2018	532	± 4.8%	50%	42%	–	8%
Normington, Petts & Associates (D-DiNicola)	June 5–7, 2018	400	± 4.9%	50%	44%	–	6%
Public Policy Polling (D-DiNicola)	May 21–22, 2018	623	± 3.9%	48%	43%	–	10%

==== Predictions ====
Source	Ranking	As of
The Cook Political Report	Lean R	November 5, 2018
Inside Elections	Likely R	November 5, 2018
Sabato's Crystal Ball	Lean R	November 5, 2018
RCP	Tossup	November 5, 2018
Daily Kos	Lean R	November 5, 2018
538	Likely R	November 7, 2018
CNN	Lean R	October 31, 2018
Politico	Lean R	November 4, 2018

==== Results ====
Pennsylvania's 16th congressional district, 2018
Party	Candidate	Votes	%
Republican	Mike Kelly (incumbent)	135,348	51.5
Democratic	Ronald DiNicola	124,109	47.3
Libertarian	Ebert "Bill" Beeman	2,939	1.1
Write-in		167	0.1
Total votes		262,563	100.0
Republican hold			

== District 17 ==
2018 Pennsylvania's 17th congressional district election
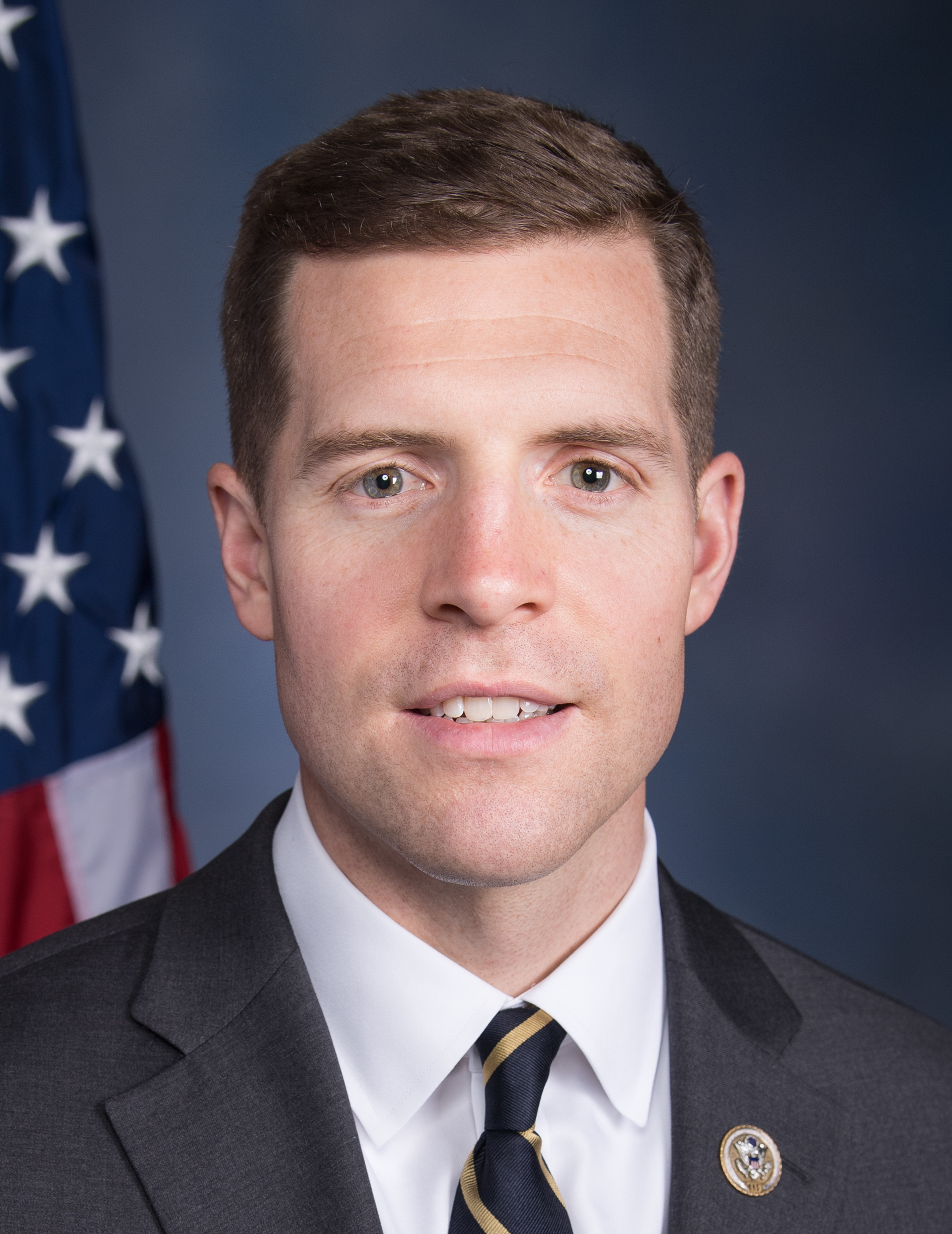

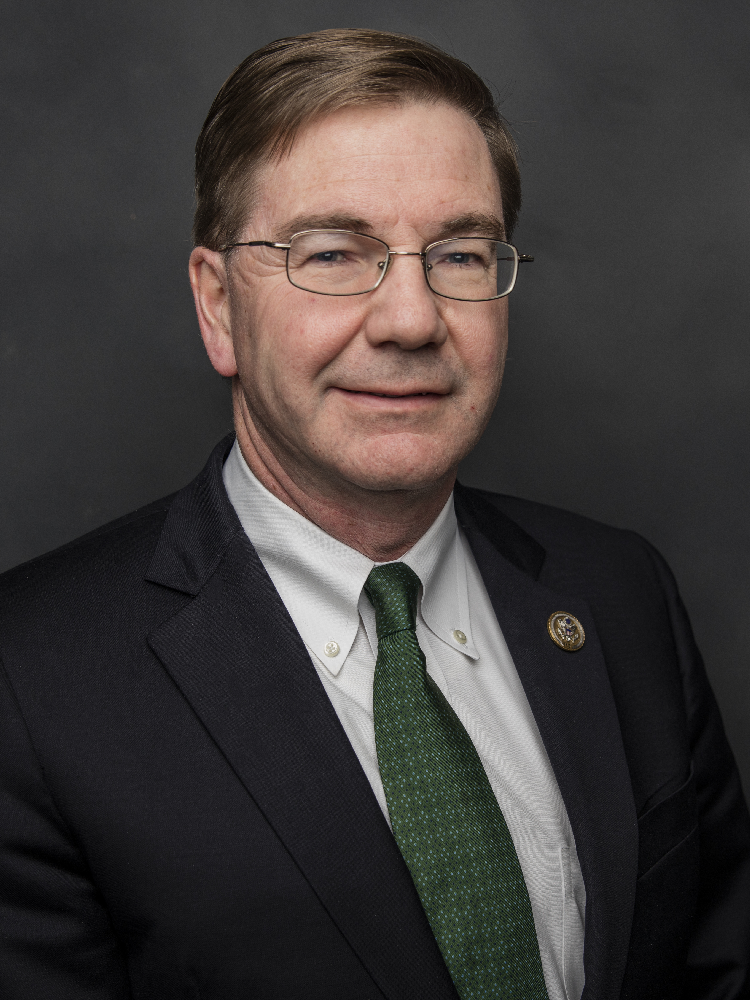
Nominee	Conor Lamb	Keith Rothfus
Party	Democratic	Republican
Popular vote	183,162	142,417
Percentage	56.2%	43.7%
- Lamb: 40–50% 50–60% 60–70% 70–80% 80–90% >90% Rothfus: 50–60% 60–70% 70–80% Tie: 50%
U.S. Representative before election
Keith Rothfus (12th)
Republican
Elected U.S. Representative
Conor Lamb
Democratic

The former 17th district was in Northeastern Pennsylvania, but the new 17th district consists of suburbs west of Pittsburgh. The district overlaps with parts of the former 12th district, which was represented by Republican Keith Rothfus. Rothfus had held office since 2013, and ran for reelection in the new 17th.

The new map drew the home of Democrat Conor Lamb, who won a special election for the old 18th District, into the new 17th. The 17th is far less Republican than its predecessor, and voted for Democrats downballot, leading to speculation that Lamb would run for a full term in the 17th regardless of the special election result. On March 14, Democratic officials in Beaver County, which is entirely within the 17th, received a written request from Lamb for their endorsement in the 2018 general election. On March 20, Lamb formally filed to run for a full term in the 17th.

=== Republican primary ===
==== Candidates ====
===== Nominee =====
- Keith Rothfus, incumbent U.S. representative

==== Primary results ====
Republican primary results
Party	Candidate	Votes	%
Republican	Keith Rothfus (incumbent)	38,513	98.3
Write-in		649	1.7
Total votes		39,162	100.0

=== Democratic primary ===
==== Candidates ====
===== Nominee =====
- Conor Lamb, incumbent U.S. representative

==== Primary results ====
Democratic primary results
Party	Candidate	Votes	%
Democratic	Conor Lamb (incumbent)	52,590	99.1
Write-in		467	0.9
Total votes		53,057	100.0

=== General election ===
==== Endorsements ====
Keith Rothfus (R)

Executive branch officials

- Donald Trump, 45th president of the United States (2017–2021)

Organizations

- BIPAC
- National Republican Congressional Committee "Patriot" Program
Conor Lamb (D)

Labor unions

- AFL-CIO
- Communications Workers of America
- International Brotherhood of Boilermakers
- Service Employees International Union

Organizations

- End Citizens United
- MoveOn
- With Honor Fund

==== Debate ====
2018 Pennsylvania's 17th congressional district debate
No.	Date	Host	Moderator	Link	Democratic	Republican
Key: P Participant A Absent N Not invited I Invited W Withdrawn						
Key: P Participant A Absent N Not invited I Invited W Withdrawn					Conor Lamb	Keith Rothfus
1	October 16, 2018	WTAE-TV	Mike Clark		P	P

==== Polling ====
Poll source	Date(s) administered	Sample size	Margin of error	Keith Rothfus (R)	Conor Lamb (D)	Other	Undecided
Monmouth University	October 5–8, 2018	354	± 5.2%	42%	54%	0%	4%
Monmouth University	July 19–22, 2018	355 LV	± 5.2%	40%	53%	2%	5%
Monmouth University	July 19–22, 2018	401 RV	± 4.9%	39%	51%	2%	9%

==== Predictions ====
Source	Ranking	As of
The Cook Political Report	Likely D (flip)	November 5, 2018
Inside Elections	Lean D (flip)	November 5, 2018
Sabato's Crystal Ball	Likely D (flip)	November 5, 2018
RCP	Likely D (flip)	November 5, 2018
Daily Kos	Likely D (flip)	November 5, 2018
538	Safe D (flip)	November 7, 2018
CNN	Lean D (flip)	October 31, 2018
Politico	Likely D (flip)	November 4, 2018

==== Results ====
Pennsylvania's 17th congressional district, 2018
Party	Candidate	Votes	%
Democratic	Conor Lamb (incumbent)	183,162	56.2
Republican	Keith Rothfus (incumbent)	142,417	43.7
Write-in		184	0.1
Total votes		325,763	100.0
Democratic gain from Republican			

== District 18 ==
2018 Pennsylvania's 18th congressional district election
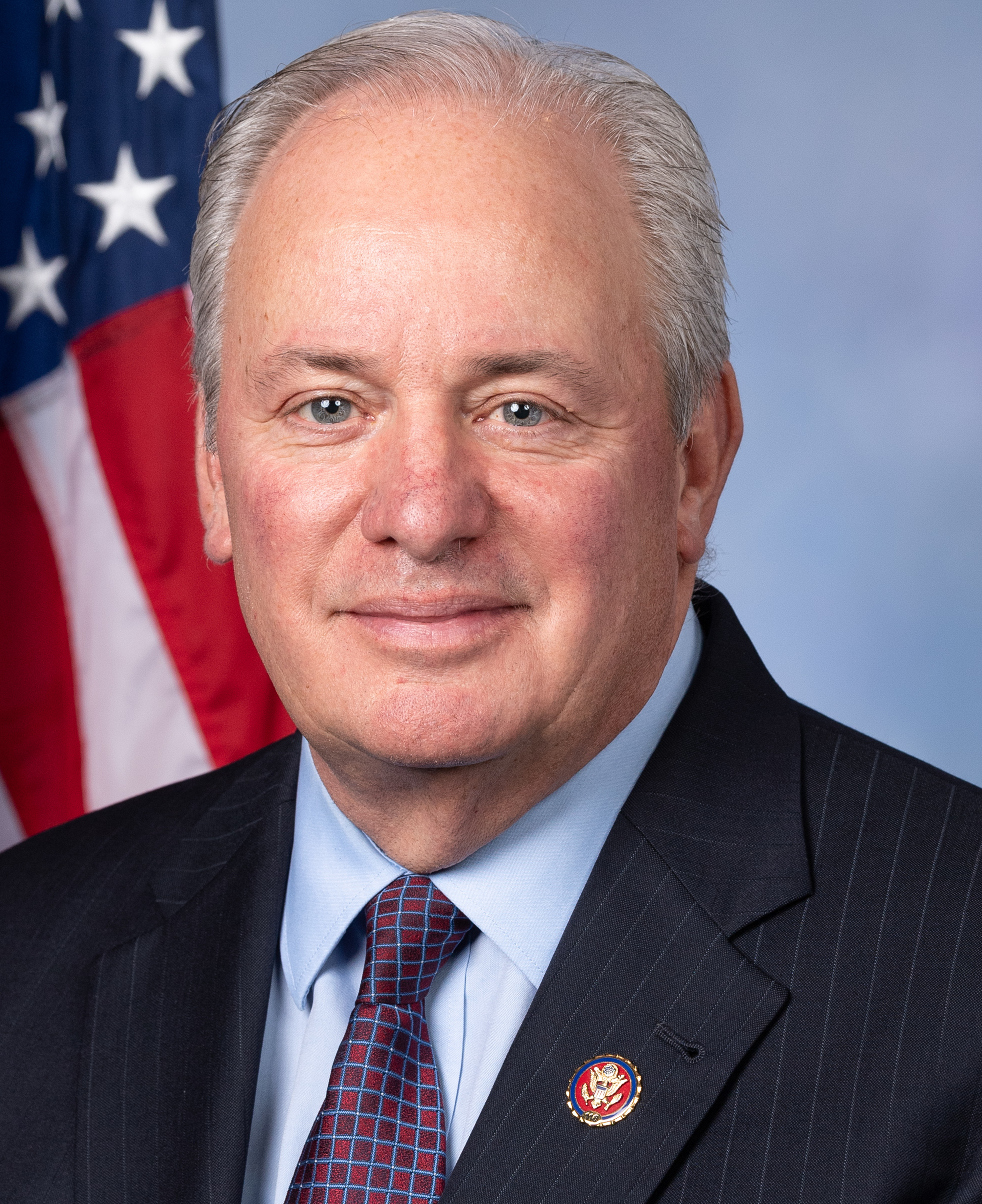
Nominee	Mike Doyle
Party	Democratic
Popular vote	231,472
Percentage	96.1%
- Doyle: 70–80% 80–90% >90% No votes
U.S. Representative before election
Mike Doyle (14th)
Democratic
Elected U.S. Representative
Mike Doyle
Democratic

The 18th district formerly consisted of the southern suburbs of Pittsburgh, but the new district is now centered on Pittsburgh itself. The district overlaps with the former 14th district, which was represented by Democrat Michael F. Doyle. Doyle had held office since 1995. He ran unopposed in the general election.

=== Democratic primary ===
==== Candidates ====
===== Nominee =====
- Michael F. Doyle, incumbent U.S. representative

===== Eliminated in primary =====
- Janis C. Brooks, pastor, CEO/founder of Citizens to Abolish Domestic Apartheid and candidate for this seat in 2012, 2014 & 2016

==== Primary results ====
Democratic primary results
Party	Candidate	Votes	%
Democratic	Mike Doyle (incumbent)	52,080	75.6
Democratic	Janis Brooks	16,549	24.0
Write-in		260	0.4
Total votes		68,889	100.0

=== General election ===
==== Predictions ====
Source	Ranking	As of
The Cook Political Report	Safe D	November 5, 2018
Inside Elections	Safe D	November 5, 2018
Sabato's Crystal Ball	Safe D	November 5, 2018
RCP	Safe D	November 5, 2018
Daily Kos	Safe D	November 5, 2018
538	Safe D	November 7, 2018
CNN	Safe D	October 31, 2018
Politico	Safe D	November 4, 2018

==== Endorsements ====
Mike Doyle (D)

Labor unions

- AFL-CIO
- Communications Workers of America
- International Brotherhood of Boilermakers
- Service Employees International Union

Organizations

- Sierra Club

==== Results ====
Pennsylvania's 18th congressional district, 2018
Party	Candidate	Votes	%
Democratic	Mike Doyle (incumbent)	231,472	96.1
Write-in		9,452	3.9
Total votes		240,924	100.0
Democratic hold			

== See also ==
- 2018 United States House of Representatives elections

Official campaign websites
- District 1
  - Brian Fitzpatrick (R) for Congress
  - Scott Wallace (D) for Congress
- District 2
  - Brendan Boyle (D) for Congress
  - David Torres (R) for Congress
- District 3
  - Dwight Evans (D) for Congress
  - Bryan Leib (R) for Congress
- District 4
  - Dan David (R) for Congress
  - Madeleine Dean (D) for Congress
- District 5
  - Pearl Kim (R) for Congress
  - Mary Gay Scanlon (D) for Congress
- District 6
  - Chrissy Houlahan (D) for Congress
  - Greg McCauley (R) for Congress Archived May 14, 2018, at the Wayback Machine
- District 7
  - Marty Nothstein (R) for Congress
  - Tim Silfies (L) for Congress Archived August 25, 2018, at the Wayback Machine
  - Susan Wild (D) for Congress
- District 8
  - Matt Cartwright (D) for Congress
  - John Chrin (R) for Congress
- District 9
  - Dan Meuser (R) for Congress
  - Denny Wolff (D) for Congress
- District 10
  - Scott Perry (R) for Congress
  - George Scott (D) for Congress
- District 11
  - Jess King (D) for Congress Archived August 28, 2017, at the Wayback Machine
  - Lloyd Smucker (R) for Congress
- District 12
  - Marc Friedenberg (D) for Congress
  - Tom Marino (R) for Congress
- District 13
  - John Joyce (R) for Congress
  - Brent Ottaway (D) for Congress
- District 14
  - Bibiana Boerio (D) for Congress
  - Guy Reschenthaler (R) for Congress
- District 15
  - Susan Boser (D) for Congress Archived March 21, 2018, at the Wayback Machine
  - G.T. Thompson (R) for Congress
- District 16
  - Ron DiNicola (D) for Congress
  - Mike Kelly (R) for Congress
- District 17
  - Conor Lamb (D) for Congress Archived November 7, 2017, at the Wayback Machine
  - Keith Rothfus (R) for Congress
- District 18
  - Mike Doyle (D) for Congress
