= Bibiana Boerio =

American businesswoman (born 1954)

Personal details
- Born: March 17, 1954 (age 72) Latrobe, Pennsylvania, U.S.
- Party: Democratic
- Education: Seton Hill University (BA); University of Pittsburgh (MBA)

Bibiana Boerio (born 17 March 1954) is an American businesswoman. She has served as the managing director of Jaguar Cars (the first woman to hold that post), chief of staff to U.S. Representative Joe Sestak (D-PA), and interim president of Seton Hill University. She was the Democratic nominee for Pennsylvania's 14th congressional district in the 2018 election, losing to Republican Guy Reschenthaler.

== Early life ==
Boerio was born in Latrobe, Pennsylvania to an Italian-American father, James Boerio. Boerio has two brothers and two sisters, including a twin sister. Her father was a skilled manual machining worker. She graduated from Greensburg Central Catholic School in 1971. She received her bachelor's degree in textiles and design from Seton Hill University and an MBA from Joseph M. Katz Graduate School of Business at the University of Pittsburgh. She was awarded a Distinguished Alumna Leadership Award in 1995 and an honorary Doctor of Laws in 2000 from Seton Hill. As of 2018 Boerio is on the board of directors of Saint Vincent College, and in 2018 she was awarded the college's Presidential Medal of Honor. Her twin sister, Juliana, is a chemistry professor.

== Career ==
Boerio was recruited by J. Edward Lundy, leaving business school and joining Ford Motor Company in September 1976. She joined Ford's British affiliate, Jaguar Cars, in August 1995, becoming their chief finance officer - making her the first woman to serve on Jaguar's board of directors - until 2000. By October 2000, she had become head of Ford Motor Credit Company (Ford Credit), staying there until 2003. In 2004, she returned to Jaguar, this time as managing director, and in late 2005 she oversaw the launch of the all-aluminum Jaguar XK (X150).

Boerio served as chief of staff to United States Representative Joe Sestak from 2008 to 2010. She also served as interim president of Seton Hill University from 2013 to 2014.

On September 19, 2012, Boerio was nominated by President Barack Obama to become director of the United States Mint, however Congress never acted to confirm her appointment.

=== 2018 U.S. House campaign ===
Boerio announced a congressional run in March 2018 for Pennsylvania's 14th congressional district. On May 15, 2018, she won the Democratic primary and became the party's nominee. In the November 2018 general election, Boerio was defeated by Republican Guy Reschenthaler. Boerio won 42.1% of the vote to Reschenthaler's 57.9%

Business positions
Preceded by Mike Wright	Managing Director of Jaguar Cars; 2004–2007	Succeeded by Mike O'Driscoll
