= Gregory James Edwards =

American politician

Rev. Dr. Gregory James Edwards
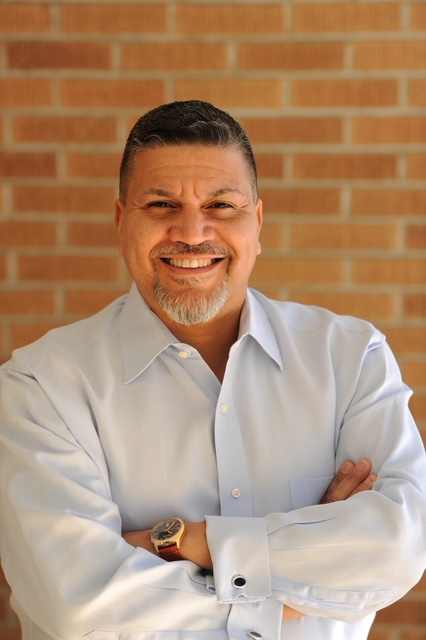
- Education: Geneva College, University of Delaware, New Brunswick Theological Seminary.
- Occupations: Minister, clergy, community activist, politician, and author.

Rev. Dr. Gregory James Edwards is an American minister, clergyman, community activist, progressive politician, and author. He is also the Executive Director for POWER Interfaith.

== Education ==
Edwards earned a Bachelor of Science degree in Urban Ministry from Geneva College. He later received certification in Community Economic Development from the University of Delaware, a Master's of Divinity from Drew University, and a Doctorate in Ministry from the New Brunswick Theological Seminary.

== Career ==
=== Religion ===
Edwards was raised in the African Methodist Episcopal Church (1969–1987), and licensed for ministry in the Baptist Church (1995). In 2002, after graduating from seminary (Drew University Theological School) he founded Resurrected Life Community Church (RLCC). In 2011, he established the Resurrected Community Development Corporation (RCDC), a 501(c) non-profit organization based in Greater Lehigh Valley. In 2019, the congregation became affiliated with the United Church of Christ.

His contextual approach to ministry is based upon the intersection of faith, education, economic self-sufficiency, and public policy.

To serve more children and families, Edwards led Resurrected Life’s acquisition of the historic Zion’s Reformed United Church of Christ (aka the Liberty Bell Church) in 2023 and its subsequent $1 million renovation in 2024.

In 2025, under his visionary leadership, Resurrected Life and RCDC will complete an $8 million renovation to the church’s Old Allentown Campus, which will further the organizations’ ability to serve more children, students, and families in an area of the city with the highest concentration of poverty and lowest literacy levels.

=== Community education ===
In 2011, Rev. Edwards established the Resurrected Life Children's Academy, an early education center licensed by the Pennsylvania Department of Human Services; and in 2014, he established the James Lawson Freedom School in partnership with the Children's Defense Fund. Both programs are initiatives of the Resurrected Community Development Corporation.

=== Politics ===
In 2018, Edwards became one of six Democratic candidates to run for the U.S. House of Representatives Pennsylvania District 7 (formerly District 15) seat, following the retirement of Republican representative Charlie Dent.

On April 29, 2018, Edwards's congressional campaign was endorsed by Vermont Senator and former U.S. presidential candidate Bernie Sanders. He also received endorsements from other political groups.

In a tight Democratic primary race, Edwards followed candidates Susan Wild and John Morganelli, and ultimately, the U.S. Democratic Congressional Campaign Committee chose Wild as its candidate.

Although Edwards did not win the race, he made history as the first African-American in the Lehigh Valley to run for a federal office position and was featured in Battleground, the PBS documentary covering Lehigh Valley politics.

Edwards remains active in local, state, and national politics. He was named Chair of the Lehigh County Democratic Black Caucus in 2019, and he was appointed to the Pennsylvania Democratic State Committee in 2020.

=== Activism ===
Edwards is a community organizer and activist for the civil and human rights of all. He is most vocal on issues concerning the African-American and Latinx communities and low-income families. Throughout his career, Edwards has been known to participate in protests, write open letters and op-eds to oppose corrupt policies and politicians, and organize groups of people to take non-violent, direct action.

In 2015, when the Allentown School District ranked 487 out of 500 Pennsylvania districts, Edwards led a rally calling for a sweeping change that would correct the curriculum, leadership, racism, and sexual harassment issues and claims that were prevalent at the time.

In 2017, Edwards was arrested along with eight other demonstrators when he protested outside Pat Meehan's Washington D.C. office to oppose the controversial GOP tax bill. The same year, he was the keynote speaker at a rally held in memory of Trayvon Martin.

In 2020, following the murders of George Floyd, Ahmaud Arbery, and Breonna Taylor, Edwards organized a protest in Allentown, Pennsylvania, to bring attention to racial injustices and the need for police reform.

During Donald Trump's presidency, Edwards was also a speaker at the May Day rally at the Pennsylvania Capitol building. He joined hundreds of immigrants opposing the administration's anti-immigration policies.

Leading up to the 2024 Presidential Election, Edwards contributed to a variety of news outlets. He appeared on NPR's Morning Edition with Michel Martin to discuss his efforts in Allentown, Pa., to encourage younger generations of Black Americans to vote. Edwards also co-authored a Newsweek op-ed with Marcus Bass of the North Carolina Black Alliance that tackled the growing political disillusionment among young Black men.

=== POWER Interfaith ===
As the Executive Director for POWER Interfaith, Pennsylvania’s largest multiracial, multi-faith, multi-class community organizing entity advancing racial and economic justice, Edwards serves on several local and national boards, including Finanta, formerly known as the Community First Fund, the Church Building and Loan Fund, and the Amistad Redevelopment Corporation of the United Church of Christ.

== Awards and honors ==
- Man of Vision Award | National Association for the Advancement of Colored People (NAACP)
- Community Development Award | Allentown Human Relations Commission
- Morehouse College - Martin Luther King Jr. College of Pastoral Leadership
- Morehouse College - Martin Luther King Jr. Board of Preachers
