= 2018 United States Senate election in Pennsylvania =

- November 6, 2018
- Turnout: 58.18%
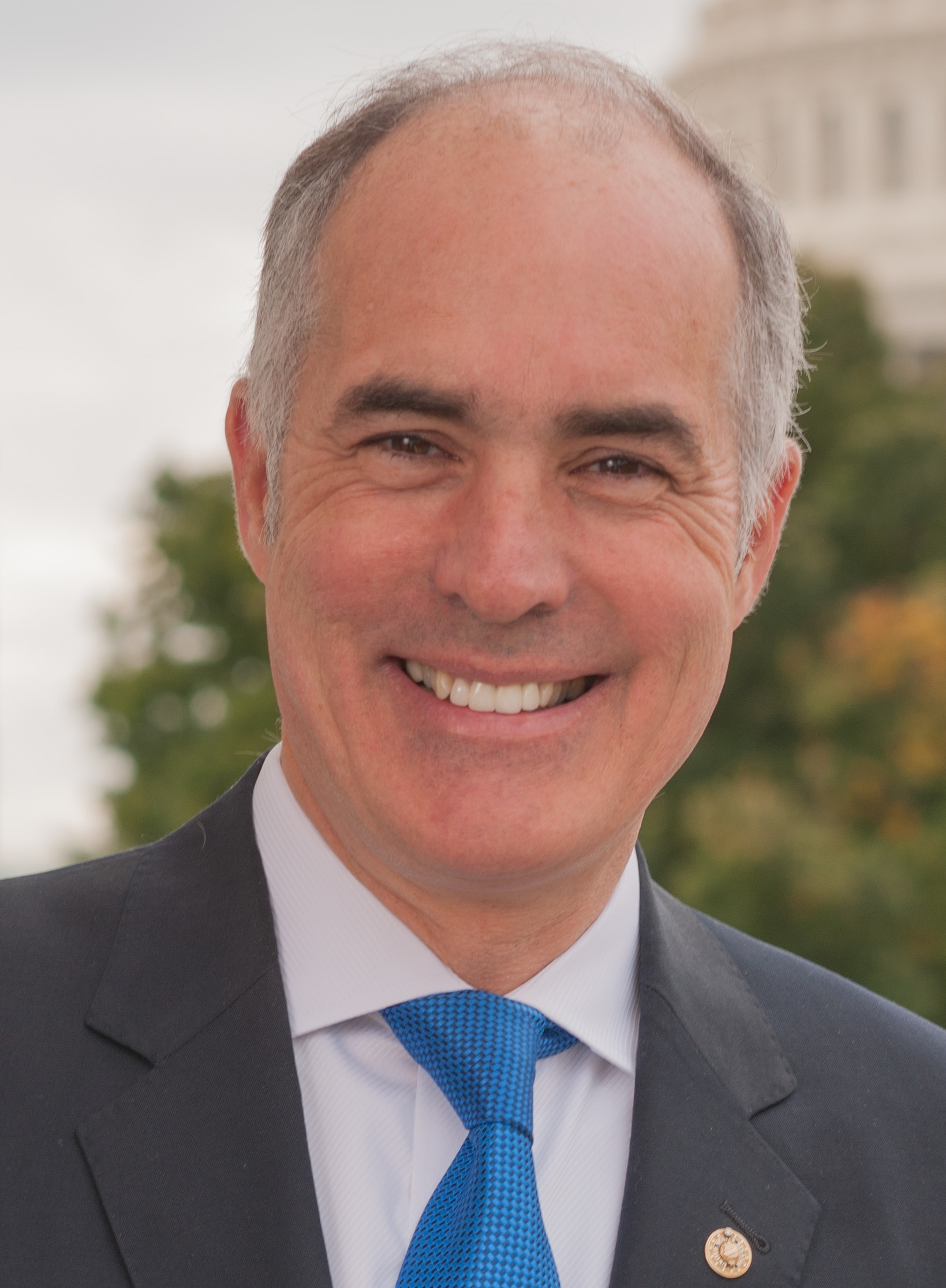

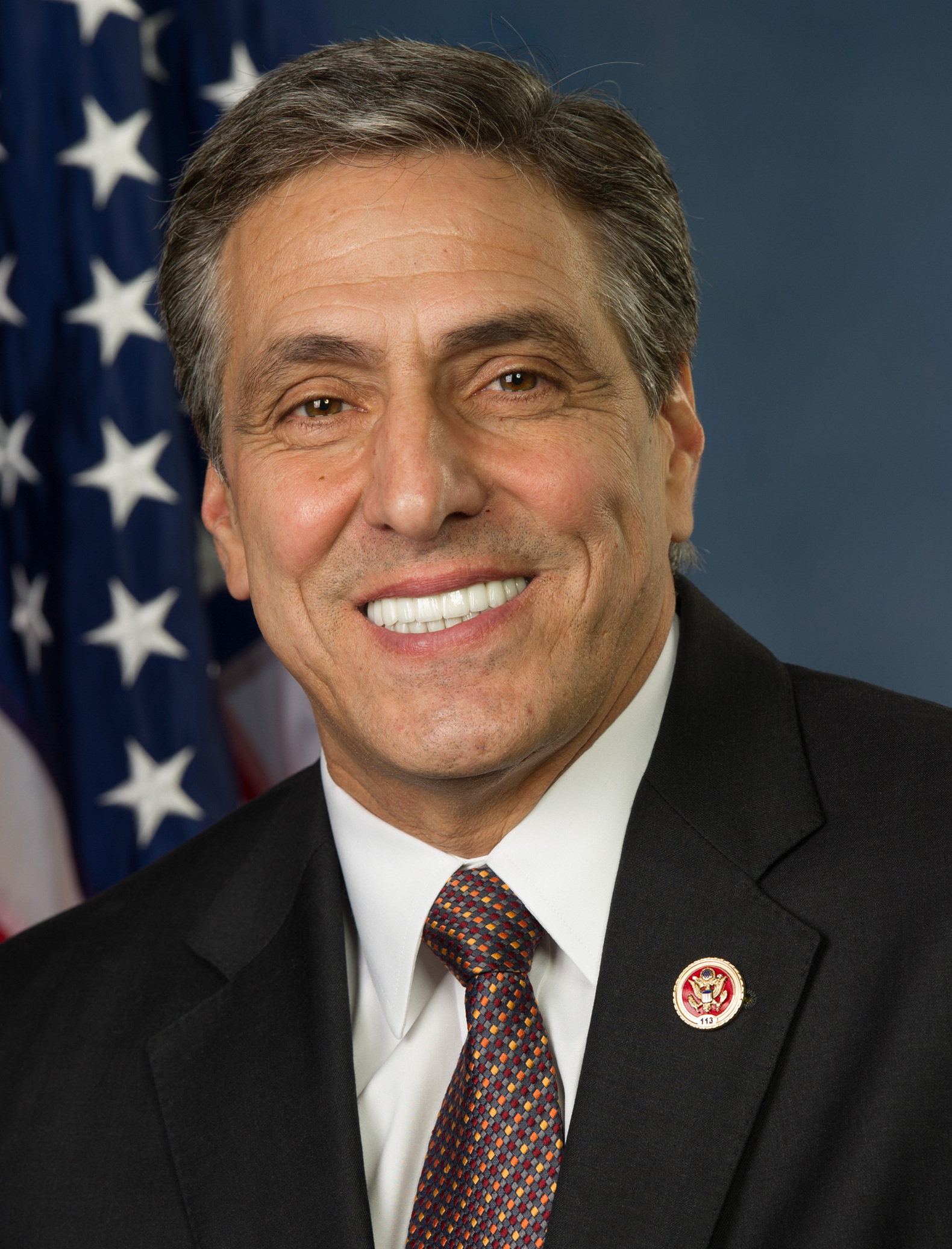
Nominee	Bob Casey Jr.	Lou Barletta
Party	Democratic	Republican
Popular vote	2,792,437	2,134,848
Percentage	55.73%	42.60%
- Casey: 40–50% 50–60% 60–70% 70–80% 80–90% >90% Barletta: 40–50% 50–60% 60–70% 70–80% 80–90% >90% Tie: 40–50% 50% No data
U.S. senator before election
Bob Casey Jr.
Democratic
Elected U.S. Senator
Bob Casey Jr.
Democratic

The 2018 United States Senate election in Pennsylvania took place on November 6, 2018, to elect a member of the United States Senate to represent the State of Pennsylvania, concurrently with other elections to the United States Senate, elections to the United States House of Representatives, and various state and local elections. This was one of ten Democratic-held Senate seats up for election in a state that Donald Trump won in the 2016 presidential election. The primary elections were held on May 15. Incumbent Democratic Senator Bob Casey Jr. ran for re-election to a third term. Casey, who faced no primary opposition, defeated the Republican nominee, Lou Barletta, Green Party nominee Neal Gale, and Libertarian Party nominee Dale Kerns. Casey was the first senator to be elected to a third term from Pennsylvania since Arlen Specter in 1992, and the first Pennsylvania Democrat to be popularly elected to three terms in the Senate.

== Democratic primary ==
=== Candidates ===
==== On ballot ====
- Bob Casey Jr., incumbent U.S. Senator

=== Results ===
Democratic primary results
Party	Candidate	Votes	%
Democratic	Bob Casey Jr. (incumbent)	Unopposed	
Total votes		752,008	100.00%

== Republican primary ==
=== Candidates ===
==== On ballot ====
- Lou Barletta, U.S. Representative from Hazleton
- Jim Christiana, state representative from Beaver

==== Withdrew ====
- Paul Addis, businessman (running for PA-5)
- Cynthia E. Ayers, cyber security consultant and former National Security Agency employee
- Jeff Bartos, real estate developer (running for lieutenant governor)
- Paul DeLong, candidate for the U.S. Senate in 2004
- Bobby Lawrence, small business owner (endorsed Dale Kerns)
- Rick Saccone, state representative (ran for PA-18, ran for PA-14)
- Andrew Shecktor, Berwick Borough Councilman (running for PA-9)

==== Declined ====
- Mike Kelly, U.S. Representative
- Pat Meehan, former U.S. Representative
- Dave Reed, Majority Leader of the Pennsylvania House of Representatives

=== Endorsements ===
Jim Christiana

State senators

- Jake Corman, State Senator from the 34th district (1999–2022), Pennsylvania State Senate Majority Leader (2015–2020)

State representatives

- Kerry Benninghoff, State Representative from the 171st district (1997–present)
- Garth Everett, State Representative from the 84th district (2007–2020)
- Mark Mustio, State Representative from the 44th district (2003–2019)
- Dave L. Reed, State Representative from the 62nd district (2003–2018), Pennsylvania House Majority Leader (2015–2018)
- Jesse Topper, State Representative from the 78th district (2014–present)
- Mike Turzai, 140th Speaker of the Pennsylvania House of Representatives (2015–2020), State Representative from the 28th district (2001–2020), candidate for Governor in 2018

Newspapers

- The Beaver County Times
Cynthia E. Ayers (withdrew)

Individuals

- Brigadier General Ken Chrosniak, former instructor at the U.S. Army War College
- Henry Cooper, former Director of the Strategic Defense Initiative
- Dr. Brian Hay, business executive and national security expert
- Major General Robert B. Newman Jr., former Adjutant General of Virginia (USAF)
- Dr. Peter Pry, Director of the United States Nuclear Strategy Forum, an advisory board to Congress on policies to counter Weapons of Mass Destruction.
Bobby Lawrence (withdrew)

Individuals

- Jeremy Hanson, host of Unleashed: The Jeremy Hanson Show

=== Polling ===
Poll source	Date(s) administered	Sample size	Margin of error	Lou Barletta	Jim Christiana	Other	Undecided
Susquehanna Polling & Research (R-Christiana)	April 2018	>400	–	32%	11%	–	58%
Bellwether Research (R-Addis)	September 20–24, 2017	600	± 4.0%	22%	–	<10%	60%

=== Results ===
Results by county: Barletta—>90% Barletta—80–90% Barletta—70–80% Barletta—60–70% Barletta—50–60% Christiana—50–60% Christiana—60–70% Christiana—70–80%

Republican primary results
Party	Candidate	Votes	%
Republican	Lou Barletta	433,312	63.03%
Republican	Jim Christiana	254,118	36.97%
Total votes		687,430	100.00%

== Libertarian Party ==
Dale Kerns ran unopposed for the Libertarian nomination and received the official nomination from the Pennsylvania Libertarian Party at the state convention on March 6, 2018.

=== Candidates ===
==== Nominee ====
- Dale Kerns, former Republican Eddystone Borough council member and board of directors member for Goodwill Industries

== Green Party ==
=== Candidates ===
==== Nominee ====
- Neal Gale, clean energy consultant

== General election ==
=== Candidates ===
- Lou Barletta (R), U.S. Representative
- Bob Casey Jr. (D), incumbent senator
- Neal Gale (G), clean energy consultant
- Dale Kerns (L), former Eddystone Borough council member

=== Predictions ===
Source	Ranking	As of
The Cook Political Report	Likely D	October 26, 2018
Inside Elections	Safe D	November 1, 2018
Sabato's Crystal Ball	Safe D	November 5, 2018
Daily Kos	Safe D	November 5, 2018
Fox News (Note: The Fox News Midterm Power Rankings uniquely does not contain a category for Safe/Solid races)	Likely D	November 5, 2018
CNN	Likely D	November 5, 2018
RealClearPolitics	Likely D	November 5, 2018

=== Endorsements ===
Lou Barletta (R)

Federal officials

- Mike Pence, 48th Vice President of the United States (2017–2021)
- Donald Trump, 45th President of the United States (2017–2021)

U.S. Senators

- Rick Santorum, U.S. Senator from Pennsylvania (1995–2007)

U.S. Representatives

- Ryan Costello, U.S. Representative from Pennsylvania's 6th congressional district (2015–2019)
- Charlie Dent, U.S. Representative from Pennsylvania's 15th congressional district (2005–2018)
- Brian Fitzpatrick, U.S. Representative from Pennsylvania's 8th congressional district (2017–2019)
- Mike Kelly, U.S. Representative from Pennsylvania's 3rd congressional district (2011–2019)
- Tom Marino, U.S. Representative from Pennsylvania's 10th congressional district (2011–2019)
- Pat Meehan, U.S. Representative from Pennsylvania's 7th congressional district (2011–2018)
- Scott Perry, U.S. Representative from Pennsylvania's 4th congressional district (2013–2019)
- Keith Rothfus, U.S. Representative from Pennsylvania's 12th congressional district (2013–2019)
- Bill Shuster, U.S. Representative from Pennsylvania's 9th congressional district (2001–2019)
- Lloyd Smucker, U.S. Representative from Pennsylvania's 16th congressional district (2017–2019)
- Glenn Thompson, U.S. Representative from Pennsylvania's 5th congressional district (2009–2019)

State officials

- Jim Cawley, 32nd Lieutenant Governor of Pennsylvania (2011–2015)

State senators

- Lisa Baker, state senator from the 20th district (2007–present)
- Camera Bartolotta, state senator from the 46th district (2015–present)
- John DiSanto, state senator from the 15th district (2017–present)
- John Gordner, state senator from the 27th district (2003–2022)
- Scott Martin, state senator from the 13th district (2017–present)
- Mike Regan, state senator from the 31st district (2017–present)
- Mario Scavello, state senator from the 40th district (2015–2022)
- Robert Tomlinson, state senator from the 6th district (1995–present)
- Kim Ward, state senator from the 39th district (2009–present)

State representatives

- Steve Bloom, state representative from the 199th district (2011–2019)
- Sheryl Delozier, state representative from the 88th district (2009–present)
- Doyle Heffley, state representative from the 122nd district (2011–present)
- Sue Helm, state representative from the 104th district (2007–present)
- Dawn Keefer, state representative from the 92nd district (2017–present)
- Fred Keller, state representative from the 85th district (2011–2019)
- Jerry Knowles, state representative from the 124th district (2009–present)
- Ryan Mackenzie, state representative from the 134th district (2012–present)
- John Maher, state representative from the 40th district (1997–2019)
- Kurt Masser, state representative from the 107th district (2011–present)
- Tom Mehaffie, state representative from the 106th district (2017–present)
- Daryl Metcalfe, state representative from the 12th district (1999–present)
- Dave Millard, state representative from the 109th district (2004–present)
- Kristin Phillips-Hill, state representative from the 93rd district (2015–2019)
- Greg Rothman, state representative from the 87th district (2015–present)
- Justin Simmons, state representative from the 131st district (2011–2021)
- Mike Tobash, state representative from the 125th district (2011–2020)
- Tarah Toohil, state representative from the 116th district (2011–present)

Individuals

- Nigel Farage, chair of Europe of Freedom and Direct Democracy (2004–2019), Member of the European Parliament for South East England (1999–2020), and former chair and leader of the UK Independence Party (1998–2000)
- Paul Mango, candidate for Governor in 2018
- Eric Trump, businessman and son of U.S. President Donald Trump
- Lara Trump, television host and daughter-in-law of U.S. President Donald Trump

Organizations

- Associated Builders and Contractors
- Fraternal Order of Police Fort Pitt Lodge #1
- National Electrical Contractors Association (NECA)
- National Federation of Independent Business
- National Right to Life
- Penn-Del-Jersey Chapter of NECA
- Pennsylvania GOP
- Students For Trump
- Western Pennsylvania Chapter of NECA

Newspapers

- The Patriot-News
Bob Casey Jr. (D)

Federal officials

- Joe Biden, 47th Vice President of the United States (2009–2017)
- Barack Obama, 44th President of the United States (2009–2017)

U.S. Senators

- Cory Booker, U.S. Senator from New Jersey (2013–present)
- Catherine Cortez Masto, U.S. Senator from Nevada (2017–present)
- Dick Durbin, Senate Minority Whip (2015–2021), U.S. Senator from Illinois (1997–present)
- Kamala Harris, U.S. Senator from California (2017–2021)
- Ed Markey, U.S. Senator from Massachusetts (2013–present)
- Jeff Merkley, U.S. Senator from Oregon (2009–present)
- Gary Peters, U.S. Senator from Michigan (2015–present)
- Elizabeth Warren, U.S. Senator from Massachusetts (2013–present)

U.S. Representatives

- Dwight Evans, U.S. Representative from Pennsylvania's 2nd congressional district (2016–2019)
- Conor Lamb, U.S. Representative from Pennsylvania's 18th congressional district (2018–2019)

Local and state officials

- John Fetterman, Mayor of Braddock (2006–2019) and Democratic nominee for Lieutenant Governor in 2018
- Josh Shapiro, 50th Attorney General of Pennsylvania (2017–2023)
- Tom Wolf, 47th Governor of Pennsylvania (2015–2023)

Labor unions

- Pennsylvania State AFL–CIO
- United Mine Workers of America

Organizations

- Council for a Livable World
- End Citizens United
- Equality Pennsylvania
- League of Conservation Voters
- National Committee to Preserve Social Security and Medicare
- Natural Resources Defense Council Action Fund
- Sierra Club
Neal Gale (G)

Organizations

- Green Party
- Green Party of Pennsylvania
Dale Kerns (L)

Governors

- Gary Johnson, 29th Governor of New Mexico (1995–2003), Libertarian nominee for President in 2012 and 2016, nominee for Senate in New Mexico in 2018
- Bill Weld, 68th Governor of Massachusetts (1991–1997), Libertarian nominee for Vice President in 2016

State and local politicians

- Brandon Magoon, Majority Inspector of Elections Erie 6-1 (Republican)
- Jennifer Moore, Upper Providence Township Auditor (Libertarian)
- Bruno Novak, Judge of Elections, Hempfield-3 (Libertarian)
- Michael Oehling Jr, Buffalo Township Republican Committeeman and Auditor

Individuals

- Bobby Lawrence, former Republican U.S. Senate candidate and small business owner

Organizations

- Libertarian Party
- Libertarian Party of Pennsylvania

=== Polling ===
View source data.

Poll source	Date(s) administered	Sample size	Margin of error	Bob Casey Jr. (D)	Lou Barletta (R)	Other	Undecided
Change Research	November 2–4, 2018	1,833	–	51%	44%	3%	–
Research Co.	November 1–3, 2018	450	± 4.6%	56%	39%	1%	4%
Muhlenberg College	October 28 – November 1, 2018	421	± 5.5%	54%	40%	–	–
Franklin & Marshall College	October 22–28, 2018	214 LV	± 9.5%	50%	35%	–	14%
Franklin & Marshall College	October 22–28, 2018	537 RV	± 6.0%	50%	31%	4%	14%
Morning Consult	October 1–2, 2018	1,188	± 3.0%	47%	32%	–	21%
Franklin & Marshall College	September 17–23, 2018	204 LV	–	50%	33%	–	15%
Franklin & Marshall College	September 17–23, 2018	545 RV	± 6.1%	48%	30%	4%	20%
Ipsos	September 12–20, 2018	1,080	± 3.0%	53%	37%	3%	7%
Muhlenberg College	September 13–19, 2018	404	± 5.5%	53%	35%	7%	6%
Rasmussen Reports	September 12–13, 2018	800	± 3.5%	52%	38%	2%	8%
Franklin & Marshall College	August 20–26, 2018	222 LV	–	47%	34%	1%	19%
Franklin & Marshall College	August 20–26, 2018	511 RV	± 6.1%	48%	29%	3%	20%
NBC News/Marist	August 12–16, 2018	713	± 4.2%	53%	38%	1%	8%
Commonwealth Leaders Fund (R)	August 13–15, 2018	2,012	± 3.6%	47%	45%	2%	6%
SurveyMonkey/Axios	June 11 – July 2, 2018	990	± 4.5%	55%	41%	–	5%
Suffolk University	June 21–25, 2018	500	± 4.4%	47%	32%	1%	21%
Franklin & Marshall College	June 4–10, 2018	472	± 6.5%	44%	27%	1%	28%
Muhlenberg College	April 4–12, 2018	414	± 5.5%	48%	32%	8%	18%
Franklin & Marshall College	March 19–26, 2018	423	± 6.8%	43%	25%	2%	30%
Public Policy Polling (D-Protect Our Care)	March 15–16, 2018	1,056	± 3.0%	54%	36%	–	10%
SurveyMonkey/Axios	February 12 – March 5, 2018	2,165	± 3.8%	52%	43%	–	5%

Hypothetical polling

with Jim Christiana

Poll source	Date(s) administered	Sample size	Margin of error	Bob Casey Jr. (D)	Jim Christiana (R)	Other	Undecided
Muhlenberg College	April 4–12, 2018	414	± 5.5%	48%	29%	3%	20%

with generic Democrat and Republican

Poll source	Date(s) administered	Sample size	Margin of error	Generic Democrat	Generic Republican	Undecided
Public Policy Polling (D-Protect Our Care)	March 15–16, 2018	1,056	± 3.0%	53%	41%	7%

=== Results ===
United States Senate election in Pennsylvania, 2018
Party	Candidate	Votes	%	±%
Democratic	Bob Casey Jr. (incumbent)	2,792,437	55.73%	+2.06%
Republican	Lou Barletta	2,134,848	42.60%	−1.97%
Libertarian	Dale Kerns	50,907	1.02%	−0.70%
Green	Neal Gale	31,208	0.62%	N/A
Write-in		1,568	0.03%	-0.01%
Total votes		5,010,968	100.0%	N/A
Democratic hold				

==== Results by county ====
County	Bob Casey Jr. Democratic		Lou Barletta Republican		Various candidates Other parties		Margin		Total votes cast
County	#	%	#	%	#	%	#	%	Total votes cast
Adams	14,880	38.054%	23,419	59.892%	803	2.054%	−8,539	−21.838%	39,102
Allegheny	355,907	65.7015%	176,351	32.5549%	9,445	1.7436%	179,556	33.1466%	541,703
Armstrong	8,065	28.3849%	19,575	68.8945%	773	2.7206%	−11,510	−40.5096%	28,413
Beaver	34,442	50.92%	31,916	47.18%	1,284	1.90%	2,526	3.74%	68,884
Bedford	4,567	24.26%	14,044	74.61%	212	1.13%	−9,477	−50.35%	18,823
Berks	73,714	51.00%	68,159	47.16%	2,660	1.84%	5,555	3.84%	144,533
Blair	14,599	33.82138%	27,826	64.46427%	740	1.71435%	−13,227	−30.6429%	43,165
Bradford	6,926	34.07123%	13,032	64.10862%	370	1.82015%	−6,106	−30.03739%	20,328
Bucks	165,408	56.20%	124,133	42.18%	4,776	1.62%	41,275	14.02%	294,317
Butler	31,010	39.009%	46,875	58.966%	1,610	2.025%	−15,865	−19.957%	79,495
Cambria	21,590	43.52%	27,367	55.17%	650	1.31%	−5,777	−11.65%	49,607
Cameron	653	37.00%	1,080	61.19%	32	1.81%	−427	−24.19%	1,765
Carbon	8,739	38.71%	13,519	59.89%	316	1.40%	−4,780	−31.46%	22,574
Centre	34,778	57.33%	24,332	40.11%	1,554	2.56%	10,446	17.22%	60,664
Chester	140,138	59.60%	92,380	39.29%	2,613	1.11%	47,758	20.31%	235,131
Clarion	4,924	35.09%	8,838	62.99%	269	1.92%	−3,914	−27.90%	14,031
Clearfield	9,540	35.59%	16,852	62.87%	411	1.54%	−7,312	−27.28%	26,803
Clinton	5,289	42.73%	6,869	55.49%	220	1.78%	−1,580	−12.76%	18,448
Columbia	8,837	39.036%	13,437	59.356%	364	1.608%	−4,600	−20.320%	22,638
Crawford	11,720	39.02%	17,813	59.31%	502	1.67%	−6,093	−20.29%	30,035
Cumberland	47,738	45.726%	54,525	52.227%	2,137	2.047%	−6,787	−6.501%	104,400
Dauphin	59,533	54.764%	47,152	43.375%	2,023	1.861%	12,381	11.389%	108,708
Delaware	163,216	65.03%	84,423	33.63%	3,363	1.34%	78,793	31.40%	251,002
Elk	4,498	39.87%	6,610	58.59%	174	1.54%	−2,112	−18.72%	11,282
Erie	58,906	58.39%	40,348	39.99%	1,635	1.62%	18,558	18.40%	100,889
Fayette	19,563	48.06%	20,514	50.40%	628	1.54%	−951	−2.34%	40,735
Forest	693	35.87%	1,201	62.16%	38	1.97%	−508	−26.29%	1,932
Franklin	17,385	31.59%	36,735	66.76%	907	1.65%	−19,350	−35.17%	55,027
Fulton	1,061	20.00%	4,173	78.68%	70	1.32%	−3,112	−58.68%	5,304
Greene	5,819	46.8217%	6,422	51.6736%	187	1.5047%	−603	−4.8519%	12,428
Huntingdon	5,126	32.2167%	10,491	65.9355%	294	1.8478%	−5,365	−33.7188%	15,911
Indiana	12,702	42.995%	16,314	55.221%	527	1.784%	−3,612	−12.226%	29,543
Jefferson	4,437	28.49%	10,872	69.80%	267	1.71%	−6,435	−41.31%	15,576
Juniata	2,412	28.48%	5,853	69.12%	203	2.40%	−3,441	−40.64%	8,468
Lackawanna	51,444	61.057%	31,922	37.887%	890	1.056%	19,522	23.170%	84,256
Lancaster	90,521	44.73%	107,454	53.10%	4,389	2.17%	−16,933	−8.37%	202,364
Lawrence	14,324	44.56%	17,375	54.05%	448	1.39%	−3,051	−9.49%	32,147
Lebanon	18,368	37.37%	29,836	60.71%	945	1.92%	−11,468	−23.34%	49,149
Lehigh	73,632	57.33%	52,576	40.93%	2,230	1.74%	21,056	16.40%	128,438
Luzerne	49,200	45.43%	58,040	53.59%	1,056	0.98%	−8,840	−8.16%	108,296
Lycoming	13,893	33.82%	26,488	64.48%	699	1.70%	−12,595	−30.66%	41,080
McKean	3,972	31.8934%	8,285	66.5248%	197	1.5818%	−4,313	−34.6314%	12,454
Mercer	18,136	44.13%	22,290	54.24%	671	1.63%	−4,154	−10.11%	41,097
Mifflin	3,934	28.607%	9,564	69.546%	254	1.847%	−5,630	−40.939%	13,752
Monroe	30,626	55.27%	23,968	43.25%	818	1.48%	6,658	12.02%	55,412
Montgomery	248,454	65.23%	126,666	33.26%	5,745	1.51%	121,788	31.97%	380,865
Montour	2,966	42.1666%	3,943	56.0563%	125	1.7771%	−977	−13.8897%	7,034
Northampton	62,275	54.33%	50,385	43.96%	1,956	1.71%	11,890	10.37%	124,550
Northumberland	10,524	36.45%	17,926	62.08%	425	1.47%	−−7,402	−25.63%	28,875
Perry	5,186	30.19%	11,607	67.57%	385	2.24%	−6,421	−37.38%	17,178
Philadelphia	481,467	86.83%	66,653	12.02%	6,387	1.15%	414,814	74.81%	554,507
Pike	8,696	41.82%	11,772	56.61%	326	1.57%	−3,076	−14.79%	20,794
Potter	1,537	24.78%	4,564	73.59%	101	1.63%	−3,027	−48.81%	6,202
Schuylkill	17,691	36.22%	30,452	62.35%	699	1.43%	−12,761	−26.13%	48,842
Snyder	4,322	32.27%	8,826	65.90%	245	1.83%	−4,504	−33.63%	28,637
Somerset	9,322	32.5523%	18,896	65.9846%	419	1.4631%	−9,574	−33.4323%	28,637
Sullivan	962	35.24%	1,720	63.00%	48	1.76%	−758	−27.76%	2,730
Susquehanna	5,521	34.69%	10,112	63.53%	283	1.78%	−4,591	−28.84%	15,916
Tioga	4,145	28.19%	10,242	69.65%	317	2.16%	−6,097	−41.46%	14,704
Union	5,901	40.863%	8,317	57.593%	223	1.544%	−2,416	−16.730%	14,441
Venango	6,945	37.5162%	11,210	60.5553%	357	1.9285%	−4,265	−23.0391%	18,512
Warren	5,390	37.51%	8,734	60.78%	245	1.71%	−3,344	−23.27%	14,369
Washington	39,220	47.54%	41,958	50.86%	1,318	1.60%	−2,738	−3.32%	82,496
Wayne	7,625	37.82%	12,269	60.85%	268	1.33%	−4,644	−23.03%	20,162
Westmoreland	63,778	43.91%	79,078	54.44%	2,402	1.65%	−15,300	−10.53%	145,258
Wyoming	3,868	36.39443%	6,582	61.93075%	178	1.67482%	−2,714	−25.53632%	10,628
York	69,272	41.03%	95,814	56.76%	3,726	2.21%	−26,542	−15.73%	168,812
Totals	2,792,437	55.74%	2,134,848	42.62%	82,115	1.64%	657,589	13.12%	5,009,400

==== Counties that flipped from Democratic to Republican ====
- Fayette (largest borough: Uniontown)
- Luzerne (largest city: Wilkes-Barre)

==== By congressional district ====
Casey won 11 of 18 congressional districts, including the 1st and 10th districts, which elected Republicans to the House.

District	Casey Jr.	Barletta	Representative
1st	57%	42%	Brian Fitzpatrick
2nd	79%	20%	
2nd	79%	20%	Brendan Boyle
3rd	93%	6%	Dwight Evans
4th	64%	34%	Madeleine Dean
5th	68%	31%	Mary Gay Scanlon
6th	59%	39%	Chrissy Houlahan
7th	56%	42%	Susan Wild
8th	52%	47%	
8th	52%	47%	Matt Cartwright
9th	40%	59%	Dan Meuser
10th	50%	48%	Scott Perry
11th	42%	56%	Lloyd Smucker
12th	38%	60%	Tom Marino
13th	44%	64%	John Joyce
14th	46%	52%	Guy Reschenthaler
15th	38%	60%	Glenn Thompson
16th	48%	50%	Mike Kelly
17th	57%	41%	Conor Lamb
18th	71%	27%	Mike Doyle

== See also ==
- 2018 United States Senate elections
- 2018 United States House of Representatives elections in Pennsylvania
- 2018 Pennsylvania gubernatorial election
