= 2018 Pennsylvania gubernatorial election =

- November 6, 2018
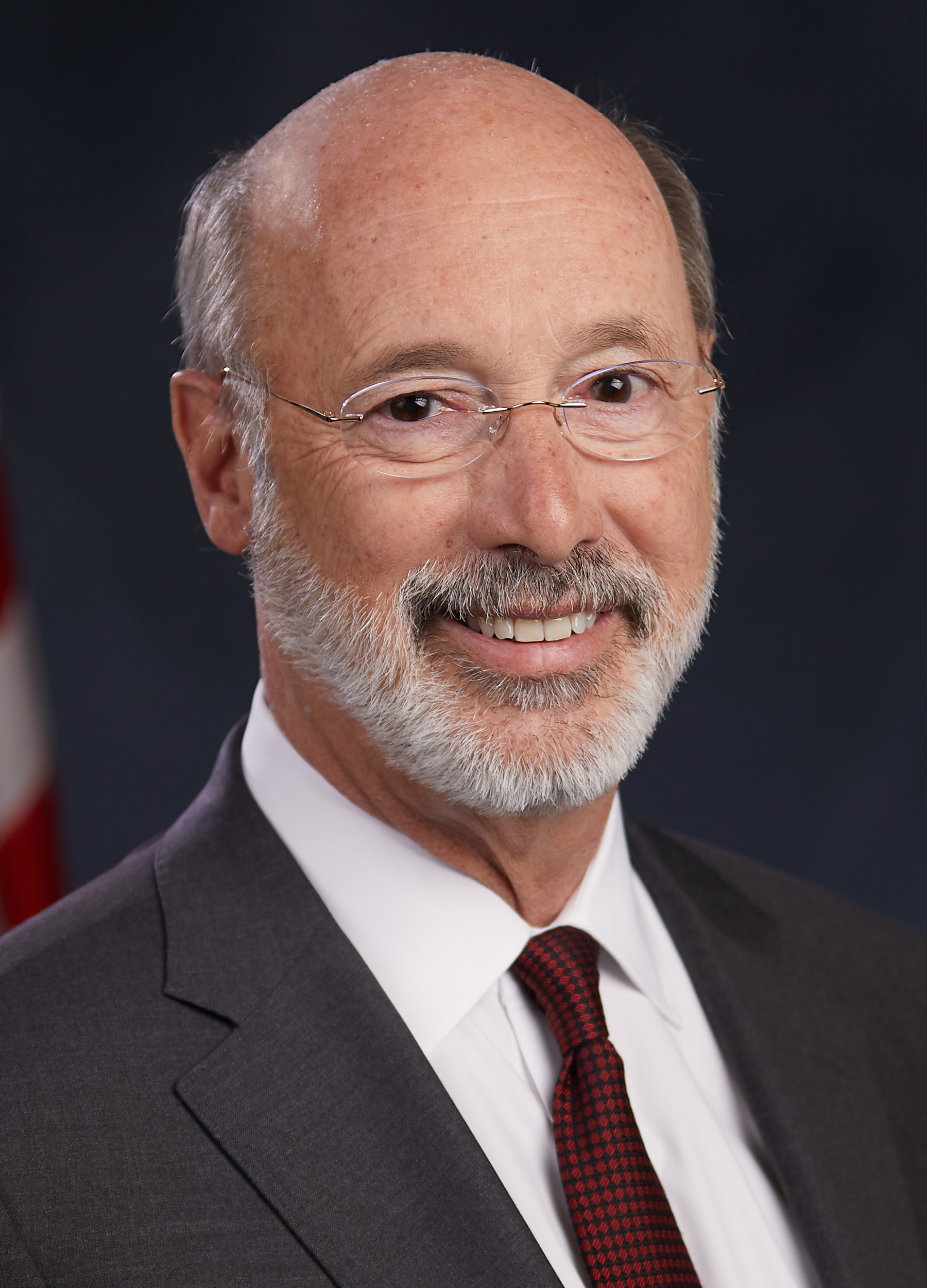

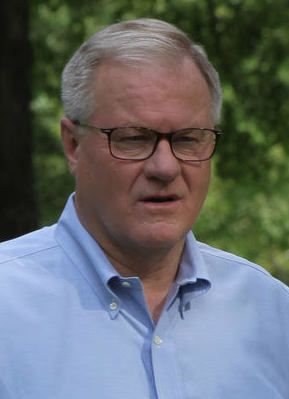
Nominee	Tom Wolf	Scott Wagner
Party	Democratic	Republican
Running mate	John Fetterman	Jeff Bartos
Popular vote	2,895,652	2,039,882
Percentage	57.74%	40.67%
- Wolf: 40–50% 50–60% 60–70% 70–80% 80–90% >90% Wagner: 40–50% 50–60% 60–70% 70–80% 80–90% >90% Tie: 40–50% 50% No data
Governor before election
Tom Wolf
Democratic
Elected Governor
Tom Wolf
Democratic

The 2018 Pennsylvania gubernatorial election took place on November 6, 2018, to elect the governor and lieutenant governor of Pennsylvania, concurrently with the election of Pennsylvania's Class I U.S. Senate seat, elections to the United States House of Representatives, and various local elections. Incumbent Governor Tom Wolf won a second term by a double-digit margin, defeating Republican challenger Scott Wagner and two third-party candidates, Paul Glover from the Green Party, and Ken Krawchuk from the Libertarian Party. The primary elections were held on May 15. This was the only Democratic-held governorship up for election in a state that Donald Trump won in the 2016 presidential election.

Wagner won eight counties that Wolf won in 2014: Lawrence, Greene, Fayette, Cambria, Clinton, Northumberland, Carbon, and Schuylkill. Meanwhile, this was the first time since Bob Casey Jr.'s landslide state treasurer win in 2004 that Cumberland County voted for the Democrat in a statewide election.

== Democratic primary ==
=== Governor ===
==== Candidate ====
===== Nominated =====
- Tom Wolf, incumbent governor

===== Results =====
Democratic primary results
Party	Candidate	Votes	%
Democratic	Tom Wolf (incumbent)	741,676	100.0
Total votes		741,676	100.0

=== Lieutenant governor ===
Incumbent Lieutenant Governor Mike Stack faced several controversies during his term, including mistreatment of state police officers assigned as his security detail. As a result, he faced several challengers in the primary, including 2016 Senate candidate John Fetterman. Stack was ultimately defeated by Fetterman, placing fourth overall.

==== Candidates ====
===== Nominated =====
- John Fetterman, mayor of Braddock and candidate for the U.S. Senate in 2016

==== Eliminated in the primary ====
- Nina Ahmad, former deputy mayor of Philadelphia
- Kathi Cozzone, Chester County commissioner
- Ray Sosa, banker and insurance broker
- Mike Stack, incumbent lieutenant governor

===== Withdrawn =====
- Aryanna Berringer, Iraq War veteran and nominee for PA-16 in 2012 (endorsed Kathi Cozzone)
- Madeleine Dean, state representative (ran for PA-04)
- Craig Lehman, Lancaster County commissioner (endorsed Kathi Cozzone)

===== Declined =====
- Erin McClelland, nominee for PA-12 in 2014 and 2016 (endorsed Fetterman)

==== Endorsements ====
Kathi Cozzone

State legislators

- Carolyn Comitta, state representative from the 156th district (2017–2020)
- John Galloway, state representative from the 140th district (2007–present)
Madeleine Dean (withdrawn)
Federal officials
- Allyson Schwartz, U.S. representative from Pennsylvania's 13th congressional district (2005–2015)

State legislators

- Matthew Bradford, state representative from the 70th district (2009–present)
- Tim Briggs, state representative from the 149th district (2009–present)
- Mary Jo Daley, state representative from the 148th district (2013–present)
- Frank Dermody, state representative from the 33rd district (1991–2020), Pennsylvania House Democratic leader (2011–2020)
- Dan Frankel, state representative from the 23rd district (1999–present)
- Joseph Markosek, state representative from the 25th district (1983–2018)
John Fetterman
Federal officials
- Bernie Sanders, U.S. senator from Vermont (2007–present) (Independent)

State officials

- Ed Rendell, 45th governor of Pennsylvania (2003–2011)

State legislators

- Ed Gainey, state representative from the 24th district (2013–2022)

Municipal officials

- Pete Buttigieg, 32nd mayor of South Bend, Indiana (2012–2020)
- Eric Papenfuse, mayor of Harrisburg (2014–2022)
- Bill Peduto, 60th mayor of Pittsburgh (2014–2022)

Labor unions

- United Steelworkers District 10

Organizations

- National Organization for the Reform of Marijuana Laws
- Steel City Stonewall Democrats

Individuals

- Randy Bryce, ironworker and candidate for Wisconsin's 1st congressional district

Newspapers

- The Philadelphia Inquirer
Mike Stack
Federal officials
- Bob Brady, U.S. representative from Pennsylvania's 1st congressional district (1998–2019)

State legislators

- Lisa Boscola, state senator from the 18th district (1999–present)
- Jim Brewster, state senator from the 45th district (2010–present)
- Jay Costa, state senator from the 43rd district (1996–present), Pennsylvania Senate minority leader (2011–present)
- Andy Dinniman, state senator from the 19th district (2006–2020)
- Larry Farnese, state senator from the 1st district (2009–2020)
- Wayne Fontana, state senator from the 42nd district (2005–present)
- Vincent Hughes, state senator from the 7th district (1994–present)
- Rich Kasunic, state senator from the 32nd district (1995–2015)
- Shirley Kitchen, state senator from the 3rd district (1996–2016)
- Daylin Leach, state senator from the 17th district (2009–2020)
- Judy Schwank, state senator from the 11th district (2011–present)
- Christine Tartaglione, state senator from the 2nd district (1995–present)
- Anthony Williams, state senator from the 8th congressional district (1999–present)
- John Yudichak, state senator from the 14th district (2011–2022)

Municipal officials

- Bobby Henon, Philadelphia City Council member from the 6th district (2012–2022)
- Jonathan Saidel, Philadelphia city controller (1990–2006)
Declined to endorse
- Pittsburgh DSA
- Tom Wolf, 47th governor of Pennsylvania (2015–2023)

==== Polling ====
Poll source	Date(s) administered	Sample size	Margin of error	Aryanna Berringer	Kathi Cozzone	Madeleine Dean	John Fetterman	Craig Lehman	Mike Stack	Undecided
Independence Communications & Campaigns, LLC	February 2–4, 2018	467	± 4.53%	2%	10%	4%	20%	1%	8%	55%

==== Primary results ====
Results by county: Fetterman—70–80% Fetterman—60–70% Fetterman—50–60% Fetterman—40–50% Fetterman—<40% Ahmad—40–50% Ahmad—<40% Cozzone—60–70% Cozzone—<40% Stack—<40%

Democratic primary
Party	Candidate	Votes	%
Democratic	John Fetterman	288,229	38.0
Democratic	Nina Ahmad	182,309	23.8
Democratic	Kathi Cozzone	142,410	18.6
Democratic	Mike Stack (incumbent)	127,259	16.6
Democratic	Ray Sosa	27,427	3.6
Total votes		767,634	100.0

== Republican primary ==
=== Governor ===
==== Candidates ====
===== Nominated =====
- Scott Wagner, state senator

==== Eliminated in the primary ====
- Laura Ellsworth, attorney
- Paul Mango, businessman and former U.S. Army officer

===== Withdrawn =====
- Mike Turzai, speaker of the Pennsylvania House of Representatives and nominee for PA-04 in 1998

===== Declined =====
- Paul Addis, businessman (ran for U.S. Senate)
- Lou Barletta, U.S. representative (ran for U.S. Senate)
- Jake Corman, majority leader of the Pennsylvania State Senate
- Mike Kelly, U.S. representative
- Dave Reed, majority leader of the Pennsylvania House of Representatives

==== Endorsements ====
Laura Ellsworth

Municipal officials

- Jim Roddey, chief executive of Allegheny County (2000–2004)

Individuals

- Carly Fiorina, businesswoman

Newspapers

- The Daily Item
- The Patriot-News
- The Philadelphia Inquirer
Paul Mango

U.S. senators

- Tom Cotton, U.S. senator from Arkansas (2015–present)
- Rick Santorum, U.S. senator from Pennsylvania (1995–2007)

Organizations

- Family Research Council
- National Organization for Marriage
Scott Wagner

Federal officials

- Mike Pence, 48th vice president of the United States (2017–2021)
- Donald Trump, 45th president of the United States (2017–2021)

Governors

- Larry Hogan, 62nd governor of Maryland (2015–2023)

U.S. representatives

- Scott Perry, U.S. representative from Pennsylvania's 4th congressional district (2013–2019)

State senators

- Camera Bartolotta, state senator from the 46th district (2015–present)
- Mike Regan, state senator from the 31st district (2017–present)
- Guy Reschenthaler, state senator from the 37th district (2015–2019)
- Pat Stefano, state senator from the 32nd district (2015–present)
- Donald C. White, state senator from the 41st district (2001–2019)

State representatives

- Keith J. Gillespie, state representative from the 47th district (2003–present)
- Seth Grove, state representative from the 196th district (2009–present)
- Dawn Keefer, state representative from the 92nd district (2017–present)
- Kate Klunk, state representative from the 169th district (2015–present)
- Kristin Phillips-Hill, state representative from the 93rd district (2015–2019)
- Stan Saylor, state representative from the 94th district (1993–2022)

Individuals

- Diamond and Silk, social media personalities and political activists

Organizations

- Associated Builders and Contractors
- Luzerne County GOP
- Pennsylvania GOP
Mike Turzai (withdrawn)
State senators
- Scott Hutchinson, state senator from the 21st district (2013–present)

State representatives

- Matt Dowling, state representative from the 51st district (2017–2022)
- Brian L. Ellis, state representative from the 11th district (2005–2019)
- R. Lee James, state representative from the 64th district (2013–present)
- Jim E. Marshall, state representative 14th district (2007–present)
- Kathy Rapp, state representative from the 65th district (2005–present)
- Ryan Warner, state representative from the 52nd district (2015–present)

==== Polling ====
Poll source	Date(s) administered	Sample size	Margin of error	Laura Ellsworth	Paul Mango	Scott Wagner	Other	Undecided
Susquehanna Polling & Research	May 4–8, 2018	545	± 4.2%	18%	23%	37%	1%	22%
ColdSpark Media (R-Ellsworth)	May 2018	–	–	17%	24%	28%	–	30%
McLaughlin & Associates (R-Wagner)	April 2–3, 2018	500	± 4.5%	9%	24%	50%	–	17%
Revily (R-American Principles Project)	March 13–15, 2018	800	± 3.4%	4%	18%	20%	–	57%
McLaughlin & Associates (R-Wagner)	September 18–20, 2017	400	± 4.9%	–	16%	45%	–	39%
McLaughlin & Associates (R-Wagner)	September 18–20, 2017	400	± 4.9%	5%	13%	45%	–	37%

Hypothetical polling

Poll source	Date(s) administered	Sample size	Margin of error	Scott Wagner	Paul Mango	Mike Turzai	Undecided
McLaughlin & Associates (R-Wagner)	April 9–10, 2017	500	± 4.5%	38%	8%	10%	45%

Poll source	Date(s) administered	Sample size	Margin of error	Scott Wagner	Paul Mango	Undecided
McLaughlin & Associates (R-Wagner)	September 18–20, 2017	400	± 4.9%	45%	16%	39%
McLaughlin & Associates (R-Wagner)	April 9–10, 2017	500	± 4.5%	42%	13%	46%

==== Results ====
Results by county: Wagner—60–70% Wagner—50–60% Wagner—40–50% Mango—40–50% Mango—50–60%

Republican primary
Party	Candidate	Votes	%
Republican	Scott Wagner	324,013	44.3
Republican	Paul Mango	270,014	36.9
Republican	Laura Ellsworth	137,650	18.8
Total votes		731,677	100.0

=== Lieutenant governor ===
==== Candidates ====
===== Nominated =====
- Jeff Bartos, businessman (running with Scott Wagner)

==== Eliminated in the primary ====
- Kathy Coder, political activist
- Peg Luksik, political activist
- Diana Irey Vaughan, Washington County commissioner (running with Paul Mango)

===== Removed from the ballot =====
- Joe Gale, Montgomery County commissioner (did not meet minimum age requirement of 30)

===== Withdrawn =====
- Gordon Denlinger, former state representative
- Otto Voit, candidate for state treasurer in 2016

===== Considered potential =====
- Dave Argall, state senator and nominee for PA-17 in 2010
- Erin Elmore, attorney, political correspondent and The Apprentice contestant

===== Declined =====
- Dan Meuser, former Pennsylvania secretary of revenue and candidate for PA-10 in 2008 (running for PA-09)
- Justin Simmons, state representative (running for PA-15)

==== Endorsements ====
Jeff Bartos
- Pennsylvania GOP

==== Results ====
Results by county: Bartos—60–70% Bartos—50–60% Bartos—40–50% Bartos—<40% Coder—40–50% Coder—<40% Vaughan—70–80% Vaughan—50–60% Vaughan—40–50% Luksik—50–60% Luksik—<40%

Republican primary
Party	Candidate	Votes	%
Republican	Jeff Bartos	317,619	46.8
Republican	Kathy Coder	147,805	21.8
Republican	Diana Irey Vaughan	119,400	17.6
Republican	Peg Luksik	93,667	13.8
Total votes		678,491	100.0

== Green Party ==
=== Governor ===
==== Candidates ====
===== Nominated =====
- Paul Glover, community organizer

=== Lieutenant governor ===
==== Candidates ====
===== Nominated =====
- Jocolyn Bowser-Bostick

==== Endorsements ====
Paul Glover
- Patch Adams, physician and activist

== Libertarian Party ==
=== Governor ===
==== Candidates ====
===== Nominated =====
- Ken Krawchuk, technology consultant and nominee for governor in 1998, 2002, and 2014

=== Lieutenant governor ===
==== Nominated ====
- Kathleen Smith, entrepreneur (running with Ken Krawchuk)

== General election ==
=== Candidates ===
- Paul Glover (G), author, community organizer
- Ken Krawchuk (L), IT entrepreneur, freelance writer
- Scott Wagner (R), former state senator
- Tom Wolf (D), incumbent governor

=== Debates ===
- October 1, 2018: Complete video of debate (begins at 08:50)

=== Endorsements ===
Scott Wagner (R)

Federal officials

- Mike Pence, 48th vice president of the United States (2017–2021)
- Donald Trump, 45th president of the United States (2017–2021)

Governors

- Larry Hogan, 62nd governor of Maryland (2015–2023)

U.S. representatives

- Scott Perry, U.S. representative from Pennsylvania's 4th congressional district (2013–2019)

State senators

- Camera Bartolotta, state senator from the 46th district (2015–present)
- Mike Regan, state senator from the 31st district (2017–present)
- Guy Reschenthaler, state senator from the 37th district (2015–2019)
- Pat Stefano, state senator from the 32nd district (2015–present)
- Donald C. White, state senator from the 41st district (2001–2019)

State representatives

- Keith J. Gillespie, state representative from the 47th district (2003–present)
- Seth Grove, state representative from the 196th district (2009–present)
- Dawn Keefer, state representative from the 92nd district (2017–present)
- Kate Klunk, state representative from the 169th district (2015–present)
- Kristin Phillips-Hill, state representative from the 93rd district (2015–2019)
- Stan Saylor, state representative from the 94th district (1993–2022)

County Commissioners

- Chris Reilly, York County commissioner (1996–2020)

Individuals

- Diamond and Silk, social media personalities and political activists

Organizations

- Associated Builders and Contractors
- Luzerne County GOP
- Pennsylvania GOP
Tom Wolf (D)
Federal officials
- Joe Biden, 47th vice president of the United States (2009–2017)
- Eric Holder, 82nd United States attorney general (2009–2015)
- Barack Obama, 44th president of the United States (2009–2017)

Governors

- Ricardo Rosselló, governor of Puerto Rico (2017–2019)

U.S. representatives

- Dwight Evans, U.S. representative from Pennsylvania's 2nd congressional district (2016–2019)

State representatives

- Madeleine Dean, state representative from the 153rd district (2012–2018)
- Brian Joseph Kirkland, state representative from the 159th district (2017–2022)
- Leanne Krueger, state representative from the 161st district (2015–present)

Individuals

- Laura Gómez, actress
- Kevin Hart, actor and comedian
- Meek Mill, rapper
- Tom Perez, chair of the DNC (2017–2021)
- Zachary Quinto, actor and film producer
- Michael G. Rubin, businessman
- Mary Gay Scanlon, former member of the Wallingford-Swarthmore School Board
- Wanda Sykes, actress

Organizations

- Democratic Governors Association
- Human Rights Campaign
- Pennsylvania Democratic Party
- Planned Parenthood

=== Predictions ===
Source	Ranking	As of
The Cook Political Report	Likely D	October 26, 2018
The Washington Post	Likely D	November 5, 2018
FiveThirtyEight	Safe D	November 5, 2018
Rothenberg Political Report	Likely D	November 1, 2018
Sabato's Crystal Ball	Safe D	November 5, 2018
RealClearPolitics	Safe D	November 4, 2018
Daily Kos	Safe D	November 5, 2018
Fox News (Note: The Fox News Midterm Power Rankings uniquely does not contain a category for Safe/Solid races)	Likely D	November 5, 2018
Politico	Likely D	November 5, 2018
Governing	Likely D	November 5, 2018

=== Polling ===
View source data.

Poll source	Date(s) administered	Sample size	Margin of error	Tom Wolf (D)	Scott Wagner (R)	Other	Undecided
Change Research	November 2–4, 2018	1,833	–	53%	42%	3%	–
Research Co.	November 1–3, 2018	450	± 4.6%	54%	39%	1%	6%
Muhlenberg College	October 28 – November 1, 2018	421	± 5.5%	58%	37%	–	–
Franklin & Marshall College	October 22–28, 2018	214 LV	± 9.5%	59%	33%	–	5%
Franklin & Marshall College	October 22–28, 2018	537 RV	± 6.0%	57%	27%	6%	10%
Morning Consult	October 1–2, 2018	1,188	± 3.0%	48%	36%	–	16%
Franklin & Marshall College	September 17–23, 2018	204 LV	–	52%	30%	–	17%
Franklin & Marshall College	September 17–23, 2018	545 RV	± 6.1%	52%	28%	2%	18%
Ipsos	September 12–20, 2018	1,080	± 3.0%	55%	38%	2%	6%
Muhlenberg College	September 13–19, 2018	404	± 5.5%	55%	36%	6%	2%
Rasmussen Reports	September 12–13, 2018	800	± 3.5%	52%	40%	3%	5%
Franklin & Marshall College	August 20–26, 2018	222 LV	–	52%	35%	1%	12%
Franklin & Marshall College	August 20–26, 2018	511 RV	± 6.1%	51%	32%	5%	14%
Marist College	August 12–16, 2018	713	± 4.2%	54%	40%	<1%	6%
Commonwealth Leaders Fund (R)	August 13–15, 2018	2,012	± 3.6%	46%	43%	3%	8%
Suffolk University	June 21–25, 2018	500	± 4.4%	49%	36%	1%	14%
Franklin & Marshall College	June 4–10, 2018	472	± 6.5%	48%	29%	1%	23%
Muhlenberg College	April 4–12, 2018	414	± 5.5%	47%	31%	5%	16%
Franklin & Marshall College	March 19–26, 2018	137	± 6.8%	38%	21%	6%	35%

Hypothetical polling

with Paul Mango

Poll source	Date(s) administered	Sample size	Margin of error	Tom Wolf (D)	Paul Mango (R)	Other	Undecided
Muhlenberg College	April 4–12, 2018	414	± 5.5%	47%	27%	5%	22%
Franklin & Marshall College	March 19–26, 2018	143	± 6.8%	49%	22%	4%	25%

with Laura Ellsworth

Poll source	Date(s) administered	Sample size	Margin of error	Tom Wolf (D)	Laura Ellsworth (R)	Other	Undecided
Muhlenberg College	April 4–12, 2018	414	± 5.5%	46%	26%	4%	24%
Franklin & Marshall College	March 19–26, 2018	143	± 6.8%	51%	22%	2%	25%

=== Results ===
The election was not close, with Wolf defeating Wagner by about 17 percentage points. Wolf won by running up large margins in Allegheny County, including Pittsburgh, and Philadelphia County, including Philadelphia. Wolf's victory can also be attributed to his strong performance in Philadelphia suburbs.

2018 Pennsylvania gubernatorial election
Party	Candidate	Votes	%	±%
Democratic	Tom Wolf (incumbent) John Fetterman	2,895,652	57.74%	+2.90%
Republican	Scott Wagner Jeff Bartos	2,039,882	40.67%	−4.32%
Libertarian	Ken Krawchuk Kathleen Smith	49,229	0.98%	N/A
Green	Paul Glover Jocolyn Bowser-Bostick	27,792	0.55%	N/A
Write-in		2,706	0.05%	-0.11%
Total votes		5,015,261	100.0%	N/A
Democratic hold				

==== Results by county ====
County	Tom Wolf Democratic		Scott Wagner Republican		Ken Krawchuk Libertarian		Paul Glover Green		Margin		Total votes cast
County	#	%	#	%	#	%	#	%	#	%	Total votes cast
Adams	15,862	40.62%	22,501	57.62%	435	1.11%	255	0.65%	-6,639	-17.00%	39,053
Allegheny	364,710	67.38%	168,893	31.20%	5,244	0.97%	2,458	0.45%	195,817	36.18%	541,305
Armstrong	8,839	35.87%	15,373	62.38%	278	1.13%	153	0.62%	-6,534	-26.51%	24,643
Beaver	36,166	53.28%	30,593	45.07%	711	1.05%	406	0.60%	5,573	8.21%	67,876
Bedford	4,408	23.37%	14,261	75.60%	110	0.58%	84	0.45%	-9,853	-52.23%	18,863
Berks	76,136	52.72%	65,756	45.53%	1,619	1.12%	915	0.63%	10,380	7.19%	144,426
Blair	14,622	33.60%	28,175	64.74%	508	1.17%	217	0.50%	-13,553	-31.14%	43,522
Bradford	6,852	33.56%	13,068	64.00%	319	1.56%	181	0.89%	-6,216	-30.44%	20,420
Bucks	172,302	58.54%	117,912	40.06%	2,602	0.88%	1,513	0.51%	54,390	18.48%	294,329
Butler	32,891	41.26%	45,242	56.76%	1,088	1.36%	490	0.61%	-12,351	-15.50%	79,711
Cambria	21,639	43.37%	27,530	55.18%	413	0.83%	312	0.63%	-5,891	-11.81%	49,894
Cameron	619	34.91%	1,127	63.56%	17	0.96%	10	0.56%	-508	-28.65%	1,773
Carbon	9,659	42.85%	12,476	55.35%	267	1.18%	140	0.62%	-2,817	-12.50%	22,542
Centre	34,961	57.62%	24,353	40.13%	849	1.40%	515	0.85%	10,608	17.49%	60,678
Chester	145,212	61.33%	87,873	37.11%	2,448	1.03%	1,242	0.52%	57,339	24.22%	236,775
Clarion	5,191	36.83%	8,594	60.98%	195	1.38%	114	0.81%	-3,403	-24.15%	14,094
Clearfield	9,235	34.34%	17,241	64.11%	251	0.93%	165	0.61%	-8,006	-29.77%	26,892
Clinton	5,517	44.22%	6,727	53.92%	165	1.32%	67	0.54%	-1,210	-9.70%	12,476
Columbia	9,822	43.39%	12,424	54.88%	244	1.08%	148	0.65%	-2,602	-11.49%	22,638
Crawford	12,137	39.74%	17,859	58.47%	342	1.12%	206	0.67%	-5,722	-18.73%	30,544
Cumberland	52,807	50.54%	49,496	47.37%	1,504	1.44%	671	0.64%	3,311	3.17%	104,478
Dauphin	64,045	59.00%	42,436	39.09%	1,362	1.25%	706	0.65%	21,609	19.91%	108,549
Delaware	167,211	66.71%	80,576	32.15%	1,780	0.71%	1,076	0.43%	86,635	34.56%	250,643
Elk	4,206	37.22%	6,918	61.22%	101	0.89%	76	0.67%	-2,712	-24.00%	11,301
Erie	60,790	59.77%	39,387	38.72%	929	0.91%	605	0.59%	21,403	21.05%	101,711
Fayette	19,791	48.38%	20,471	50.04%	384	0.94%	263	0.64%	-680	-1.66%	40,909
Forest	746	38.49%	1,159	59.80%	19	0.98%	14	0.72%	-413	-21.31%	1,938
Franklin	18,447	33.59%	35,634	64.88%	525	0.96%	316	0.58%	-17,187	-31.29%	54,922
Fulton	1,037	19.58%	4,202	79.34%	39	0.74%	18	0.34%	-3,165	-59.76%	5,296
Greene	5,844	46.95%	6,381	51.26%	115	0.92%	108	0.87%	-537	-4.31%	12,448
Huntingdon	5,037	31.68%	10,586	66.57%	177	1.11%	101	0.64%	-5,549	-34.89%	15,901
Indiana	12,715	43.25%	16,179	55.04%	289	0.98%	213	0.72%	-3,464	-11.79%	29,396
Jefferson	4,277	27.46%	11,036	70.86%	173	1.11%	88	0.57%	-6,759	-43.40%	15,574
Juniata	2,550	30.02%	5,780	68.06%	101	1.19%	62	0.73%	-3,230	-38.04%	8,493
Lackawanna	54,237	64.63%	28,616	34.10%	624	0.74%	436	0.52%	25,621	30.53%	83,913
Lancaster	96,040	47.49%	102,229	50.55%	2,837	1.40%	1,118	0.55%	-6,189	-3.06%	202,224
Lawrence	15,035	46.63%	16,714	51.84%	291	0.90%	201	0.62%	-1,679	-5.21%	32,241
Lebanon	20,159	41.05%	28,096	57.21%	598	1.22%	255	0.52%	-7,937	-16.16%	49,108
Lehigh	77,248	60.07%	49,071	38.16%	1,485	1.15%	802	0.62%	28,177	21.91%	128,606
Luzerne	55,734	51.69%	50,701	47.02%	826	0.77%	562	0.52%	5,033	4.67%	107,823
Lycoming	14,727	35.90%	25,570	62.33%	453	1.10%	275	0.67%	-10,843	-26.43%	41,025
McKean	3,899	30.96%	8,512	67.59%	104	0.83%	78	0.62%	-4,613	-36.63%	12,593
Mercer	18,200	44.28%	22,211	54.04%	413	1.00%	276	0.67%	-4,011	-9.76%	41,100
Mifflin	4,127	30.03%	9,408	68.45%	130	0.95%	80	0.58%	-5,281	-38.42%	13,745
Monroe	32,064	57.84%	22,530	40.64%	481	0.87%	362	0.65%	9,534	17.20%	55,437
Montgomery	256,252	67.18%	120,206	31.51%	3,260	0.85%	1,728	0.45%	136,046	35.67%	381,446
Montour	3,228	46.02%	3,642	51.92%	97	1.38%	48	0.68%	-414	-5.90%	7,015
Northampton	65,749	57.11%	47,527	41.28%	1,211	1.05%	635	0.55%	18,222	15.83%	115,122
Northumberland	12,135	42.10%	16,122	55.94%	360	1.25%	204	0.71%	-3,987	-13.84%	28,821
Perry	5,905	34.34%	10,915	63.47%	262	1.52%	144	0.66%	-5,010	-29.13%	17,196
Philadelphia	484,124	87.36%	64,514	11.64%	2,593	0.47%	2,944	0.53%	419,160	76.28%	554,175
Pike	9,074	43.63%	11,408	54.85%	184	0.88%	134	0.64%	-2,334	-11.22%	20,800
Potter	1,452	23.24%	4,687	75.02%	67	1.07%	42	0.67%	-3,235	-51.78%	6,248
Schuylkill	21,179	43.47%	26,640	54.68%	570	1.17%	329	0.68%	-5,461	-11.21%	48,718
Snyder	4,833	36.25%	8,283	62.13%	149	1.12%	67	0.50%	-3,450	-25.88%	13,332
Somerset	9,138	31.81%	19,020	66.21%	366	1.27%	204	0.71%	-9,882	-34.40%	28,728
Sullivan	977	36.20%	1,661	61.54%	50	1.85%	11	0.41%	-684	-25.34%	2,699
Susquehanna	5,273	33.55%	10,137	64.49%	177	1.13%	132	0.84%	-4,864	-30.94%	15,719
Tioga	3,991	27.01%	10,472	70.86%	179	1.21%	136	0.92%	-6,481	-43.85%	14,778
Union	6,426	44.64%	7,676	53.32%	201	1.40%	93	0.65%	-1,250	-8.68%	14,396
Venango	7,431	39.90%	10,856	58.29%	242	1.30%	96	0.52%	-3,425	-18.39%	18,625
Warren	5,447	37.61%	8,766	60.53%	162	1.12%	108	0.75%	-3,319	-22.92%	14,483
Washington	39,898	48.41%	40,662	49.34%	1,282	1.56%	576	0.70%	-764	-0.93%	82,418
Wayne	8,023	39.94%	11,751	58.50%	178	0.89%	134	0.67%	-3,728	-18.56%	20,086
Westmoreland	67,950	46.45%	76,126	52.04%	1,529	1.05%	690	0.47%	-8,176	-5.59%	146,295
Wyoming	4,101	38.51%	6,344	59.57%	100	0.94%	104	0.98%	-2,243	-21.06%	10,649
York	75,313	44.57%	90,590	53.61%	2,165	1.28%	910	0.54%	-15,277	-9.04%	168,978
Totals	2,895,652	57.77%	2,039,882	40.70%	49,229	0.98%	27,792	0.55%	855,770	17.07%	5,012,555

==== Counties that flipped from Democratic to Republican ====
- Cambria (largest municipality: Johnstown)
- Carbon (largest municipality: Lehighton)
- Clinton (largest city: Lock Haven)
- Fayette (largest borough: Uniontown)
- Greene (largest municipality: Waynesburg)
- Lawrence (largest municipality: New Castle)
- Northumberland (largest borough: Sunbury)
- Schuylkill (largest city: Pottsville)

==== Counties that flipped from Republican to Democratic ====
- Cumberland (largest municipality: Carlisle)

==== By congressional district ====
Wolf won 12 of 18 congressional districts, including three that elected Republicans.

District	Wolf	Wagner	Representative
1st	59%	40%	Brian Fitzpatrick
2nd	79%	20%	Brendan Boyle
3rd	93%	6%	Dwight Evans
4th	66%	32%	Madeleine Dean
5th	69%	29%	Mary Gay Scanlon
6th	61%	37%	Chrissy Houlahan
7th	59%	39%	Susan Wild
8th	56%	43%	Matt Cartwright
9th	44%	54%	Dan Meuser
10th	54%	44%	Scott Perry
11th	45%	53%	Lloyd Smucker
12th	39%	59%	Tom Marino
13th	35%	63%	John Joyce
14th	48%	51%	Guy Reschenthaler
15th	38%	60%	Glenn Thompson
16th	50%	49%	Mike Kelly
17th	59%	39%	Conor Lamb
18th	72%	26%	Mike Doyle

== See also ==
- 2018 United States gubernatorial elections
- 2018 United States Senate election in Pennsylvania
- 2018 United States House of Representatives elections in Pennsylvania
- 2018 Pennsylvania Senate election
- 2018 Pennsylvania House of Representatives election
