= Jeff Bartos =

American businessman and diplomat

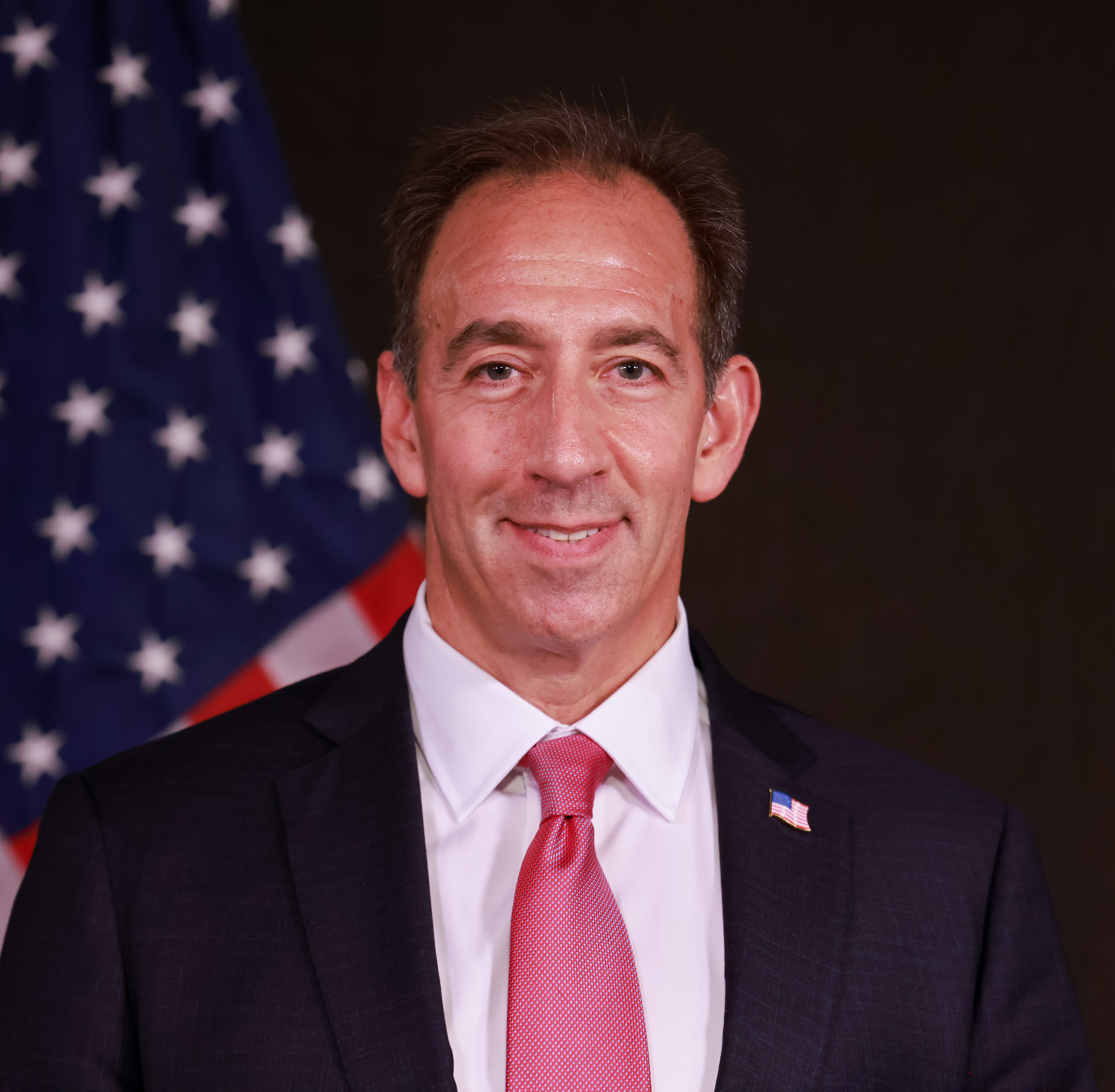
- Official portrait, 2025

United States Ambassador to the United Nations for Management and Reform
- Incumbent
- Assumed office November 3, 2025
- President: Donald Trump
- Preceded by: Chris Lu

Personal details
- Born: 1972 or 1973 (age 53–54)
- Party: Republican
- Spouse: Sheryl
- Children: 2
- Education: Emory University (BA); University of Virginia (JD)

Jeff Bartos (born 1972 or 1973) is an American real estate developer, lawyer, and diplomat currently serving as the U.S. ambassador to the United Nations for Management and Reform since 2025. A member of the Republican Party, he was the party's nominee for lieutenant governor of Pennsylvania in the 2018 election as the running mate of state legislator Scott Wagner.

Bartos was nominated by president Donald Trump to serve as ambassador in May 2025. He was confirmed by a U.S. Senate vote of 51–47 on September 18, 2025.

== Early life, education, and career ==
Bartos was born in 1972 or 1973. Bartos grew up in Reading, Pennsylvania. He studied political science at Emory University and went on to earn a J.D. degree from the University of Virginia School of Law. He initially began a practicing law before moving into real estate, holding senior executive roles at the Mark Group and Toll Brothers. Bartos would later establish ESB Holdings, a family-owned real estate development company, serving as president.

During the COVID-19 pandemic in Pennsylvania, Bartos was approached by entrepreneur Pete Snyder about starting a Pennsylvania branch of Snyder's Virginia 30 Day Fund, which worked to provide small businesses with forgivable loans during state-mandated lockdowns. He was convinced to establish the Pennsylvania 30 Day Fund, which provided $3,000 loans to over a thousand small businesses across the state.

== Political campaigns ==
=== 2018 lieutenant gubernatorial campaign ===
Bartos initially began his first political campaign in the election for U.S. senator, challenging Democratic incumbent Bob Casey Jr. He chose to withdraw once it became clear that president Donald Trump would choose to support congressman Lou Barletta, and instead ran as a candidate for lieutenant governor of Pennsylvania. He began his campaign in a joint ticket with state senator Scott Wagner, and the two were later endorsed by the Pennsylvania Republican Party. Bartos won the May 2018 primary election with 46.8% of the vote, joining Wagner in the general election to face incumbent governor Tom Wolf and his new running mate, Braddock mayor John Fetterman.

Bartos and Fetterman formed what was referred to as an "unlikely friendship" on the campaign trail. In October, the two had a "cordial but lively" televised debate on WPXI, rarely mentioning each other's names and choosing only to attack the top of each other's ticket. Wagner and Bartos would lose the general election to Wolf and Fetterman by 17 points, the worst performance for a Republican ticket since 2006.

=== 2022 U.S. Senate campaign ===
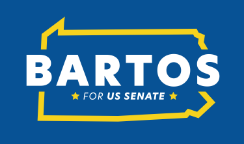
Logo for Bartos' 2022 Senate campaign.

Bartos declared his candidacy for the United States Senate in March 2021, running to succeed Republican senator Pat Toomey, who announced his retirement in October 2020. He was noted as a frontrunner in the early stages of the campaign, winning the state Republican Party Central Caucus straw poll in January 2022, though he would ultimately fall behind candidates such as hedge fund CEO Dave McCormick and television personality Mehmet Oz, the latter of which was endorsed by Trump in April. In response, Bartos referred to his opponents as "political tourists" who had only moved to Pennsylvania in order to run for office. In the May 2022 primary election, Bartos finished in fifth place with just under 5% of the vote.

== Diplomatic career ==
Congress received Trump's nomination of Bartos to serve as representative to the United Nations for Management and Reform on May 6, 2025. The Senate Committee on Foreign Relations held a hearing on July 9, where Bartos declared that Trump's leadership provided a "unique window of opportunity" to compel change and reform in the U.N., including its alleged bias against Israel. He was reported favorably by committee chairman Jim Risch on July 16, and was ultimately confirmed by the Senate on September 18 by a vote of 51 to 47.

== Personal life ==
Bartos is Jewish and resides in Montgomery County with his wife Sheryl and their two daughters. He lives an athletic lifestyle, having completed two Ironman Triathlons and seven marathons.

Party political offices
| Preceded by Jim Cawley | Republican nominee for Lieutenant Governor of Pennsylvania; 2018 | Succeeded by Carrie DelRosso |
Diplomatic posts
| Preceded by Chris Lu | United States Ambassador to the United Nations for Management and Reform; 2025–present | Incumbent |
