= Jane Alexander (politician) =

American lawyer and politician (1929–2020)

Member of the Pennsylvania House of Representatives from the 92nd district
- In office 1965–1969
- Succeeded by: Eugene Geesey

Personal details
- Born: November 29, 1929 Wilkes-Barre, Pennsylvania, U.S.
- Died: May 6, 2020 (aged 90) Harrisburg, Pennsylvania, U.S.
- Party: Democratic
- Spouse(s): P. Nelson Alexander; James A. McHale
- Education: Dickinson College of Law; Dickinson College
- Occupation: lawyer

Jane M. Alexander (November 10, 1929 – May 6, 2020) was an American politician and lawyer who served in the Pennsylvania House of Representatives from 1965 to 1969.

== Personal life ==
Jane Lehmer was born in Wilkes-Barre, Pennsylvania, on November 10, 1929. Her family returned to Dillsburg, Pennsylvania, by the time she turned two, to live on land owned by her family since shortly after William Penn founded the Colony of Pennsylvania. Lehmer's grandfather was a justice of the peace, and allowed her, aged five, to observe court proceedings over which he presided. After Lehmer graduated from Dillsburg High School, she earned her bachelor's degree from Dickinson College in 1951, followed by a degree in law from the Dickinson College of Law in 1954. She married P. Nelson Alexander, with whom she raised two biological children. Her second marriage was to James A. McHale, whom she met while both worked at the Pennsylvania Department of Agriculture.

== Legal and public service career ==
In 1955, Jane Alexander was admitted to the York County Bar Association. She was the second woman to gain membership within the county bar, and the first to actively practice law. Alexander began her legal career in criminal law. She was elected to her first political office in 1955, and sat on the Dillsburg Borough Council as its first woman member. She was named president of the body, serving from 1958 to 1959, and was also the first woman to lead the council. Alexander subsequently served as a member of the Northern Joint School Board. Affiliated with the Democratic Party, Alexander was elected to two terms on the Pennsylvania House of Representatives, serving the 92nd District from 1965 to 1969. Upon taking office, Alexander became the first women to represent York County in the Pennsylvania General Assembly. She lost her second reelection campaign in 1968. Between 1969 and 1972, Alexander was appointed to the Children's Services Advisory Board. She then worked for the Pennsylvania Department of Agriculture's Bureau of Foods and Chemistry. Governor Milton Shapp subsequently named her deputy agricultural secretary for the state. Alexander became the first woman in the United States to serve as deputy secretary of agriculture at the state level. She remained in that role through 1978, when she became the owner and president of J&J Agri-Products and Services Inc., in Dillsburg. Alexander practiced law until her death, focusing on family law, estates and real estate. Alexander died at Harrisburg Hospital, in Harrisburg, Pennsylvania, aged 90, on May 6, 2020.
