= Marc Anderson (politician) =

American politician (born c.1970)

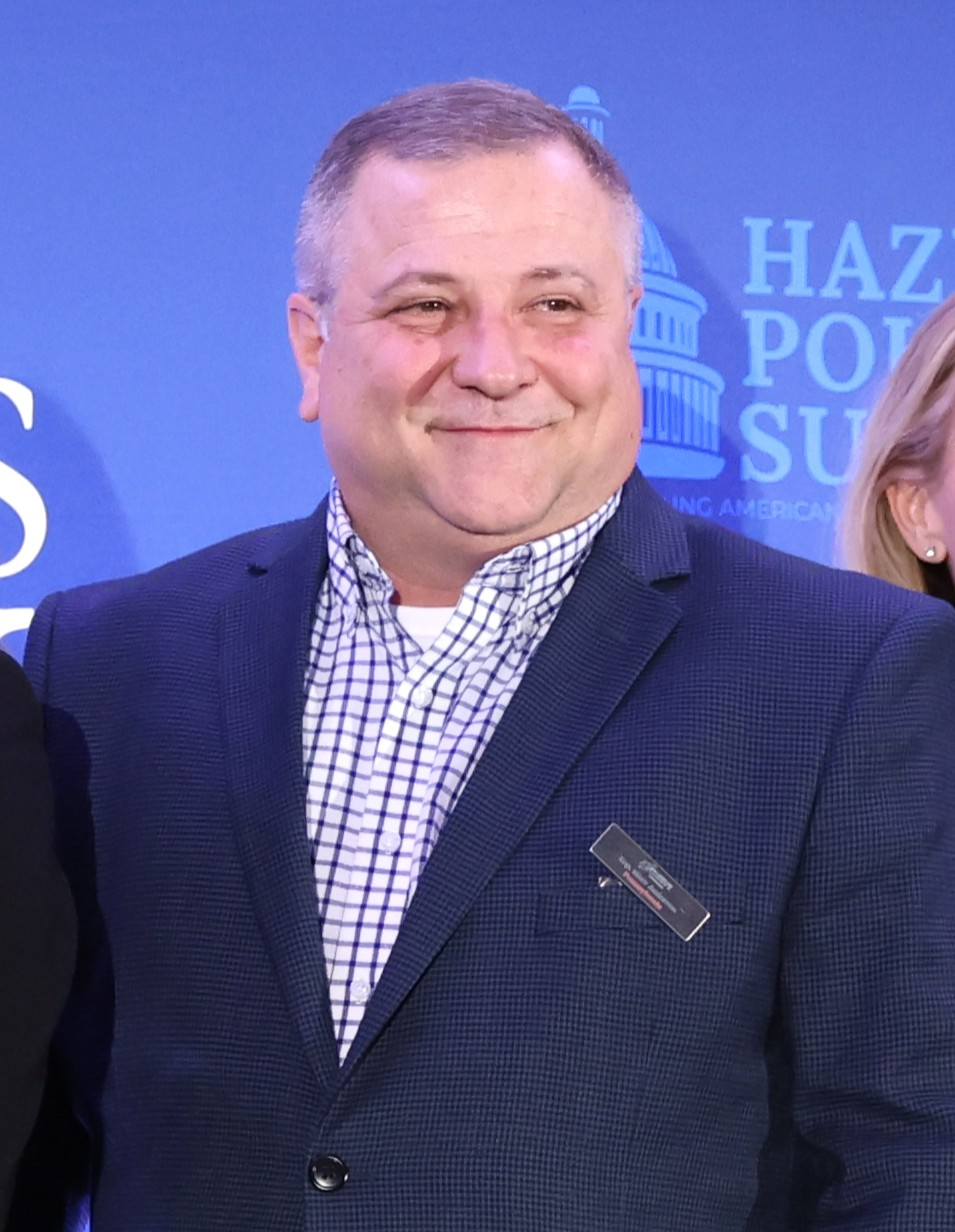

Member of the Pennsylvania House of Representatives from the 92nd district
- Incumbent
- Assumed office January 7, 2025
- Preceded by: Dawn Keefer

Personal details
- Born: c. 1970
- Party: Republican
- Spouse: Cindy
- Children: 2
- Education: Undergraduate- York College & Graduate - Penn State University

Marc S. Anderson is an American politician who is a Republican member of the Pennsylvania House of Representatives from the 92nd legislative district. He was first elected in 2024.

== Early life and education ==
Marc Anderson was born in York, PA and graduated from Mechanicsburg High School and York College. He received his Masters degree from Penn State University. A veteran of the United States Air Force, Anderson enrolled in the Troops to Teachers Program.

== Career ==
Marc Anderson served as a school administrator and teacher for 27 years, 20 of which were within the Northern York County School District.

In 2024, Anderson ran for Pennsylvania House of Representatives District 92 following the retirement of incumbent Dawn Keefer. He defeated Democratic candidate Dan Almoney in the general election, winning 70.25% of the vote.

Anderson serves on the Education, Game and Fisheries, Human Services, and Labor and Industry House Committees.

== House of Representatives ==
Marc Anderson was elected in 2024 to replace outgoing Rep. Dawn Keefer.

For the 2025-2026 Session, Anderson sits on the following committees:

- Education
- Game & Fisheries
- Human Services
- Labor & Industry

== Political positions ==
Anderson received A− ratings from the NRA Political Victory Fund and PA Pro Life Federation.

Anderson is a strong advocate for school choice and a member of the PA House Freedom Caucus.

== Personal life ==
Marc and his wife Cindy live in Carroll Township, York County PA. They raised two children.
