= Eugene Geesey =

American politician (1931–2023)

Eugene R. Geesey

Member of the Pennsylvania House of Representatives from the 92nd district
- In office 1969–1980
- Preceded by: Jane Alexander
- Succeeded by: Bruce I. Smith

Personal details
- Born: December 1, 1931 Dallastown, Pennsylvania, U.S.
- Died: January 5, 2023 (aged 91) New Oxford, Pennsylvania, U.S.
- Party: Republican

Eugene Ronald Geesey (December 1, 1931 – January 5, 2023) was a Republican member of the Pennsylvania House of Representatives.
