= Akin Rotimi =

Nigerian politician

Akintunde Rotimi

Federal Representative
- Preceded by: Peter Owolabi
- Constituency: Ekiti North (Ikole/Oye)

Personal details
- Occupation: Politician

Akintunde Rotimi also known as Akin Rotimi is a Nigerian politician. He currently serve as a member of the House of Representatives, representing Ekiti North (Ikole/Oye) Federal Constituency in the 10th National assembly. He succeeded Peter Owolabi.
