= Bruce I. Smith =

American politician

Bruce Smith

Member of the Pennsylvania House of Representatives from the 92nd district
- In office January 6, 1981 – November 30, 2006
- Preceded by: Eugene R. Geesey
- Succeeded by: Scott Perry

Personal details
- Born: February 19, 1934 (age 92) Harrisburg, Pennsylvania, U.S.
- Party: Republican
- Spouse: Patricia A. Smith
- Education: Elizabethtown College; Penn State University

Bruce Smith (born 1934) is a former Republican member of the Pennsylvania House of Representatives for the 92nd District, which covers parts of York and Cumberland counties. Smith was elected in 1980 and retired in 2006. He served as chairman of the House Game and Fisheries committee.

== Biography ==
Smith is a native of Harrisburg, Pennsylvania. He graduated from John Harris High School in 1952 and Elizabethtown College in 1956. He earned a Master of Education degree from Penn State University in 1961.

He is the college's first alumnus elected to the Pennsylvania State House.
