= James A. McHale =

American politician

James A. McHale (1928–1989) was an American politician who led the Pennsylvania Department of Agriculture from January 1971 to December 1975.

== Career ==
McHale was born in western Pennsylvania, near Ohio, in 1928. His biological father died in 1933, when McHale was five years old. McHale's mother remarried, to the veterinarian David Royer, in 1937. Royer acquired a farm in Jamestown, Pennsylvania, when McHale was nine, where McHale began working. McHale started working with another farmer, Don Leach, at age 15. Though McHale had planned to attend veterinary school upon graduating from high school, Leach offered to sell his dairy farm to McHale. After securing loans from his parents, McHale bought Leach's operation. Soon after that, McHale married his first wife, with whom he had one child. On the advice of local agricultural publications, McHale expanded his farming operations. However, this caused McHale to fall into severe debt. In 1957, McHale and other local farmers invested in bulk production and began selling their product to Beverly Farms, the only company in the area equipped to handle bulk production. As milk prices fell, McHale organized a three-week strike in August 1959, as Local 205 of the Teamsters Union. After discovering that he and local farmers were not being paid the price set by the Pennsylvania milk marketing board, McHale met with an attorney, F. Joseph Thomas. Subsequent meetings drew an attendance of 400 farmers, and the collective became the Western Pennsylvania Milk Producers Association. McHale soon switched political affiliations from the Republican Party to the Democratic Party. In 1961, McHale met with a representative of the National Farmers Union, who called United States Secretary of Agriculture Orville Freeman and arranged for McHale and Thomas to attended a meeting of agricultural organizations in Washington, D.C. Following the meeting, McHale recruited 1,200 members for the National Farmers Union during the summer. Later, McHale opted to sell his dairy farm and invest in a grain farm, so he could have more time for union work. He divested entirely from farming in 1967, and acquired a new operation in 1973.

McHale was appointed to lead the Pennsylvania Department of Agriculture on January 5, 1971. There, he met and later married Jane Alexander, who was named a deputy secretary of agriculture in 1972. He stepped down from the office in December 1975, and began an advisership to Governor Milton Shapp's administration, as Special Coordinator for Rural Planning and Programs. McHale was later a consultant for the Appalachain Regional Commission. Upon retirement from public service, McHale became president of J&J Agri-Products and Services Inc., in Dillsburg, Pennsylvania. McHale died, aged 61, on June 6, 1989, at home in York Springs, Pennsylvania.
