= Dawn Keefer =

American politician (born 1972)

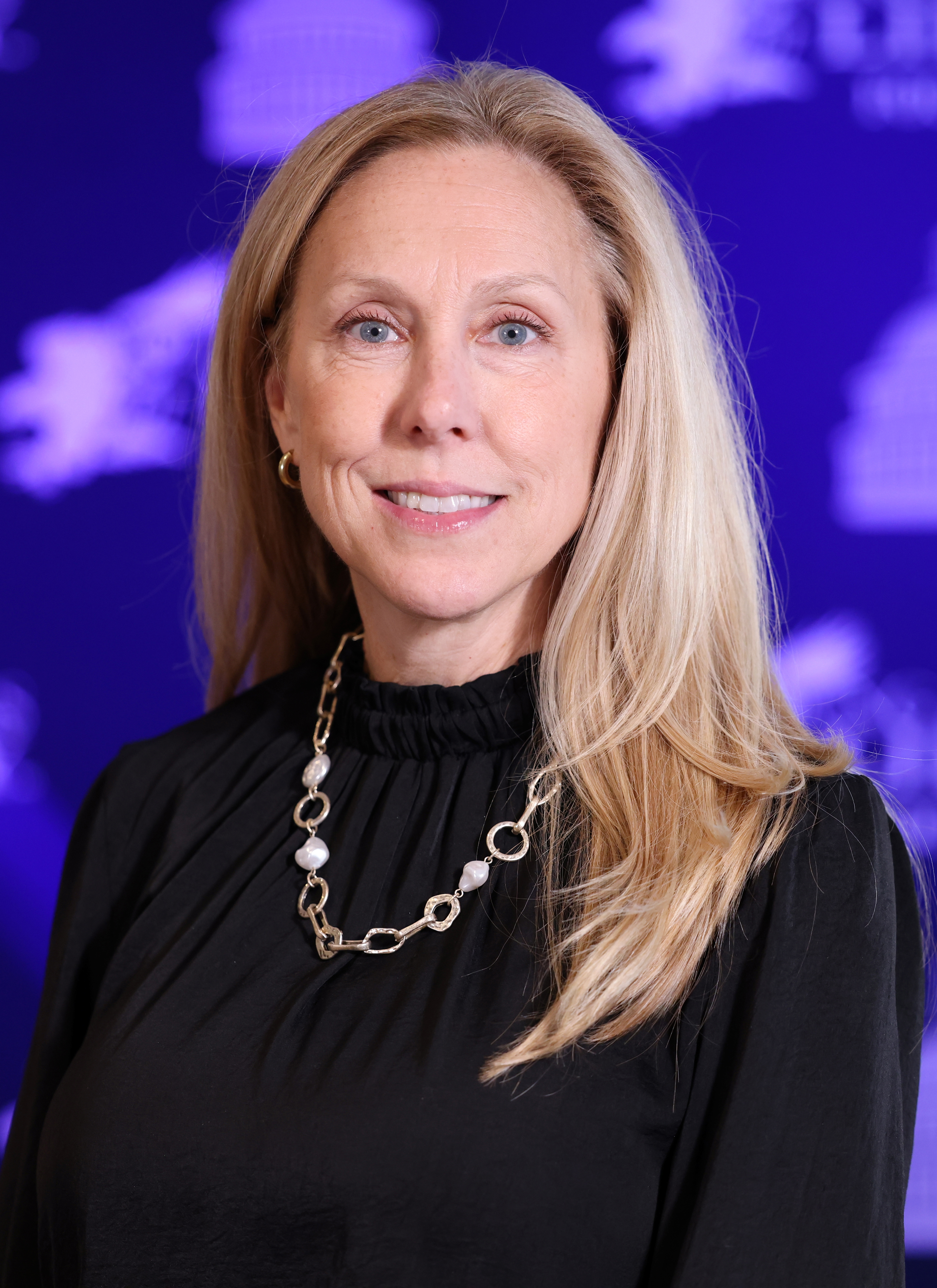
- Keefer at the 2024 Hazlitt Summit hosted by Young Americans for Liberty Foundation

Member of the Pennsylvania Senate from the 31st district
- Incumbent
- Assumed office January 7, 2025
- Preceded by: Mike Regan

Member of the Pennsylvania House of Representatives from the 92nd district
- In office January 3, 2017 – November 30, 2024
- Preceded by: Mike Regan
- Succeeded by: Marc Anderson

Personal details
- Born: October 6, 1972 (age 53) Gettysburg, Pennsylvania, U.S.
- Party: Republican
- Spouse: Tom
- Children: 3
- Education: George Mason University

Dawn Wetzel Keefer (born October 6, 1972) is an American politician who is currently a Pennsylvania State Senator from the 31st district since 2025. A member of the Republican Party, she represented the 92nd district in the Pennsylvania House of Representatives from 2017 to 2024.

== Early life and education ==
Keefer was born on October 6, 1972, in Gettysburg, Pennsylvania. She graduated from Gettysburg Area High School in 1991. In 1995, Keefer earned a BA degree in government and politics from George Mason University.

== Political career ==
Keefer was initially elected to represent the 92nd district in the Pennsylvania House of Representatives in 2016 and won reelection in 2018, 2020, and 2022.

Following the 2020 United States presidential election, Keefer supported efforts to overturn the election results in Pennsylvania, advocating for an audit of the election and an investigation into claims of election fraud despite lacking evidence. She was one of 26 Pennsylvania House Republicans who signed a letter requesting the disqualification of Pennsylvania's electoral votes. Keefer was also one of several lawmakers in contact with Congressman Scott Perry following the election; Perry was one of the chief architects of attempts to reverse the election results to favor then-President Donald Trump.

Keefer was the inaugural chairwoman of the Pennsylvania Freedom Caucus. Under her leadership, the caucus called for Pennsylvania libraries to withdraw from the American Library Association after its president, Emily Drabinski, referred to herself as a "Marxist" in a social media post. The caucus also sued the administration of Governor Josh Shapiro in 2024 after he implemented automatic voter registration in the state, claiming it to be executive overreach.

On January 11, 2024, Keefer announced her candidacy for the Pennsylvania State Senate in the 31st district following the retirement of Mike Regan. She defeated Democratic candidate Mark Temons in the general election. Keefer was appointed as the chair of the Senate Local Government Committee upon assuming office.

After President Trump issued a 2025 executive order calling for the elimination of the U.S. Department of Education, Keefer introduced a resolution to support the devolvement of education policy to the states.

For the 2025–2026 Session Keefer sits on the following committees in the State Senate:

- Local Government (Chair)
- Urban Affairs & Housing (Vice Chair)
- Consumer Protection & Professional Licensure
- Education
- Finance
- Intergovernmental Operations
- Law & Justice

== Political positions ==
Keefer is frequently described as a fiscal conservative and an advocate for small government due to her efforts to cut back and restrict government spending. She was recognized by the Conservative Political Action Committee (CPAC) for her high score on their Award for Conservative Excellence.

In 2021, Keefer and four other Republicans in the State House sponsored a bill that would have banned transgender athletes participating in the sport of their gender identity. She also co-sponsored a similar bill as a state senator.

Keefer was heavily critical of Governor Tom Wolf's efforts to mitigate the growth of the COVID-19 pandemic, chastising him for shuttering businesses to stop the spread of the disease and causing the state's subsequent growth of unemployment. She supported the immediate end of Wolf's public health mandates in 2022.

In 2026, Keefer introduced a bill to eliminate school property taxes, replacing this revenue with income and sales taxes. Keefer defended taxing pension incomes, saying, "I love retirees, but you can't drive an economy on them."

== Personal life ==
Keefer's husband is Tom. They have three children and live in Dillsburg, Pennsylvania.
