= Peter Owolabi =

Nigerian politician

Peter Owolabi is a Nigerian politician and hails from Ekiti State. He was a member representing Oye/Ikole Federal Constituency in the House of Representatives. He was succeeded by Akintunde Rotimi.

== Political career and legal challenge ==
Peter Owolabi was elected into the Federal House of Assembly at the 2019 elections. A High Court sitting in the Federal Capital Territory nullified Owolabi’s victory, declaring Kehinde Agboola of the Peoples Democratic Party (PDP) winner. Owolabi contested this judgment at the Court of Appeal and gained victory, with an order to be sworn in with a certificate of return. His rival, Agboola again challenged this ruling at the Supreme Court, but he lost as the apex court affirmed Owolabi’s victory.
In December 2023, he commenced building the Ikole Civic Center, Ekiti.
