= Mark Group =

UK company

Mark Group Limited
- Company type: Private limited company
- Industry: Energy-saving, Insulation, Microgeneration, Renewables
- Founded: 1974 (as Mark Insulations)
- Defunct: 2015 (administration)
- Fate: administration
- Headquarters: Leicester, England, United Kingdom
- Key people: Mark Babcock (VP SunEdison Europe)
- Owner: Inderpendent
- Number of employees: 2,500
- Subsidiaries: Mark Group Inc (US)
- Website: www.markgroup.co.uk www.markgroup.com

Mark Group Limited is a UK based energy advice and installation company, who focus upon energy efficiency. Mark Group went into administration on 7 October 2015. They work with homeowners, businesses, housebuilders and the construction industry, local authorities and social housing providers. Mark Group operates out of 17 locations throughout England, Scotland and Wales. Its head office is based in Leicester, East Midlands, where approximately 500 of its staff operate.

== History ==
Mark Group started in 1974 as a small family-run business, installing cavity wall and loft insulation in Leicestershire, under the name Mark Insulations.

The company was overhauled in 2006, with the introduction of renewable technology options; by 2007, the company had grown from 400 to over 1000 employees.

Mark Group sponsors Leicester Tigers RFC's Community Programme, which encourages young people to get involved in the sport. Mark Group has been supporting The Prince's Trust since 2008 and in January 2013 became the charity's first Gold Patron in the East Midlands, working to help young people locally to have a brighter future.

In 2013 Mark Group was recognised as the 'Fastest Growing Business' in the UK's Sunday Times HSBC International Track 200 Awards.

Following a change of government policy, it was announced in 2014 that Mark Group were cutting 670 jobs across the UK. Mark Group USA went out of business in December 2014. In February 2015, Mark Group New Zealand was placed in liquidation with staff laid off.

The home insulation elements of Mark Group were purchased by 4 former directors as part of a management buy out. That company became BillSaveUK in October 2015.

== International Bases ==
In 2009, Mark Group opened a base in Sydney, Australia. Mark Group Australia mirrors UK operations.

In 2010, Mark Group opened North American headquarters in Philadelphia, Pennsylvania. The opening was announced by Pennsylvania State Governor, Ed Rendell and Philadelphia Mayor, Michael Nutter.

In July, 2011, Mark Group announced its acquisition of New Zealand energy saving business, Right House. The business was acquired from electricity generator, Meridian Energy. Through the acquisition, it was stated that all of Right House's employees and operational bases would be retained and Hamish Sisson would remain as chief executive officer.

Mark Group USA went out of business in December 2014. In February 2015, Right House was placed in liquidation with staff given notice.

== Services ==
Mark Group advises on and installs energy-saving products, including: cavity wall and loft insulation, solid wall insulation, solar electric, solar hot water and air source heat pumps. The Mark Group Academy opened in 2007 for the training and development of its installers, at a purpose-built site in Leicester. The 1,000th Academy graduate was congratulated by Minister for Energy and Climate Change, Greg Barker in June 2010.

== Energy Saving Partnership ==
Energy Saving Partnership is a sister company to Mark Group. In 2008, they launched HeatSeekers vehicles, which use thermal imaging to look at heat loss, and identifying areas for better insulation. HeatSeekers works with the agreement of local authorities to image houses and its vehicles can gather up to 1,000 images every hour.

== Media ==
Mark Group has featured on both BBC and ITV providing comment for features which have focussed on energy-efficiency. The BBC's 'Low Carbon Family' broadcast in 2007 where Mark Group helped make the Hawksworth family home in Leicestershire more energy-efficient. In 2010, Mark Group featured on ITV's Tonight Show: 'Money to Burn',> looking at how consumers could fight back against the rising cost of energy bills. In June 2011, Mark Group featured in the New York Times; the article focussed on its expansion into the US.

== Administration ==
On 7 October 2015, Chris Farrington, Matt Cowlishaw and William Dawson, partners in Deloitte LLP, were appointed Joint Administrators of Mark Group Limited – In Administration ("the Company")

The affairs, business and property of the Company are currently being managed by the Joint Administrators. The Joint Administrators act as agents of the Company only and contract without personal liability. The Joint Administrators are authorised by the Institute of Chartered Accountants in England and Wales (ICAEW).

Residential & Domestic Customers (Solar Panel and Insulation Installations) Regrettably, all appointments have been cancelled for surveys and installations. We will be writing to customers shortly.

For the PV (solar panel business) the customer contracts are with SunEdison and not Mark Group Limited. SunEdison have released the following statement for customers and will be speaking directly to customers.

"SunEdison will continue to look after our existing customers, honouring existing planned installations via our channel partners."

If you have any queries in the meantime, please contact the dedicated customer service team on 0800 633 5036 or via email on UKFAmarkgroupcustomers[at]deloitte.co.uk.

New build (Insulation) The New Build business will continue to trade for a short period of time whilst a sale of the business and assets is pursued. A member of the Joint Administrators' team or the Company's management team will contact you shortly to discuss the position.

If you have any specific queries regarding New Build work in the meantime, please contact the Company's head office and ask to speak to the New Build sales team.

Suppliers The Joint Administrators are not personally adopting any contracts that may have been entered into by the Company, nor are they personally liable in respect of them. Suppliers will be contacted directly in relation to future orders. If it is necessary to place orders with you for goods and services, such orders must bear the signature of the Joint Administrators or one of their authorised representatives.

If any orders placed by the Company prior to the Administrators' appointment have not yet been completed, these should not be delivered unless you receive written confirmation, from the Joint Administrators or one of their authorised representatives, that the goods and services are still required.

Certain creditors may have a Retention of Title (ROT) claim over goods in the Company's possession. If you believe you have an ROT claim please contact one of the Joint Administrators' duly authorised representatives via email on UKFAmarkgroupsuppliers[at]deloitte.co.uk to make the necessary arrangements to deal with your claim. Such claims should be supported by relevant documentation.
