= Paul Mango =

American healthcare executive, government official and author

Paul Mango (July 5, 1959 – January 16, 2025) was an American healthcare executive, government official and author. He was best known for his role as the Deputy Chief of Staff for Policy at the U.S. Department of Health and Human Services (HHS) during the 2016 Trump administration, where he was a key figure in Operation Warp Speed, the initiative to accelerate the development, manufacturing, and distribution of COVID-19 vaccines and published a book about the subject. Mango's career spanned healthcare consulting, government service, and military service, and he was recognized for his contributions to public health policy and healthcare reform.

== Background ==
Mango was born in the United States and grew up in a military family. He attended the United States Military Academy at West Point, where he earned a Bachelor of Science degree in engineering. Following his graduation, Mango served as an officer in the United States Army, developing leadership and organizational skills that would later inform his career in healthcare and public policy.

After completing his military service, Mango pursued higher education, earning a Master of Business Administration (MBA) from Harvard Business School. His academic achievements at Harvard solidified his expertise in business strategy, preparing him for a career in consulting and healthcare leadership.

Mango died on January 16, 2025, at the age of 65.

== Work ==
After earning his MBA, Mango began his career at McKinsey & Company, a global management consulting firm, where he specialized in healthcare. Over nearly two decades, he advised hospitals, insurers, and pharmaceutical companies on strategic initiatives aimed at improving efficiency and patient outcomes. His work at McKinsey established him as a thought leader in the healthcare sector.

In 2017, Mango entered the political arena, running for the Republican nomination for Governor of Pennsylvania. Although he did not win the nomination, his campaign emphasized health care reform, fiscal responsibility, and economic growth.

Mango joined the U.S. Department of Health and Human Services in 2019, serving as the Deputy Chief of Staff for Policy. During his tenure, he played a pivotal role in Operation Warp Speed, coordinating efforts between government agencies, pharmaceutical companies, and military logisticians to expedite the development and distribution of COVID-19 vaccines. His leadership contributed to the rapid deployment of vaccines, a milestone in public health history.

In addition to his government service, Mango was an author. His book, Warp Speed: Inside the Operation That Beat COVID, the Critics, and the Odds, provides an insider's account of the vaccine development effort during the pandemic.
