= Carroll Township, York County, Pennsylvania =

Township in Pennsylvania, US

Coordinates: 40°07′00″N 77°01′59″W

- Township
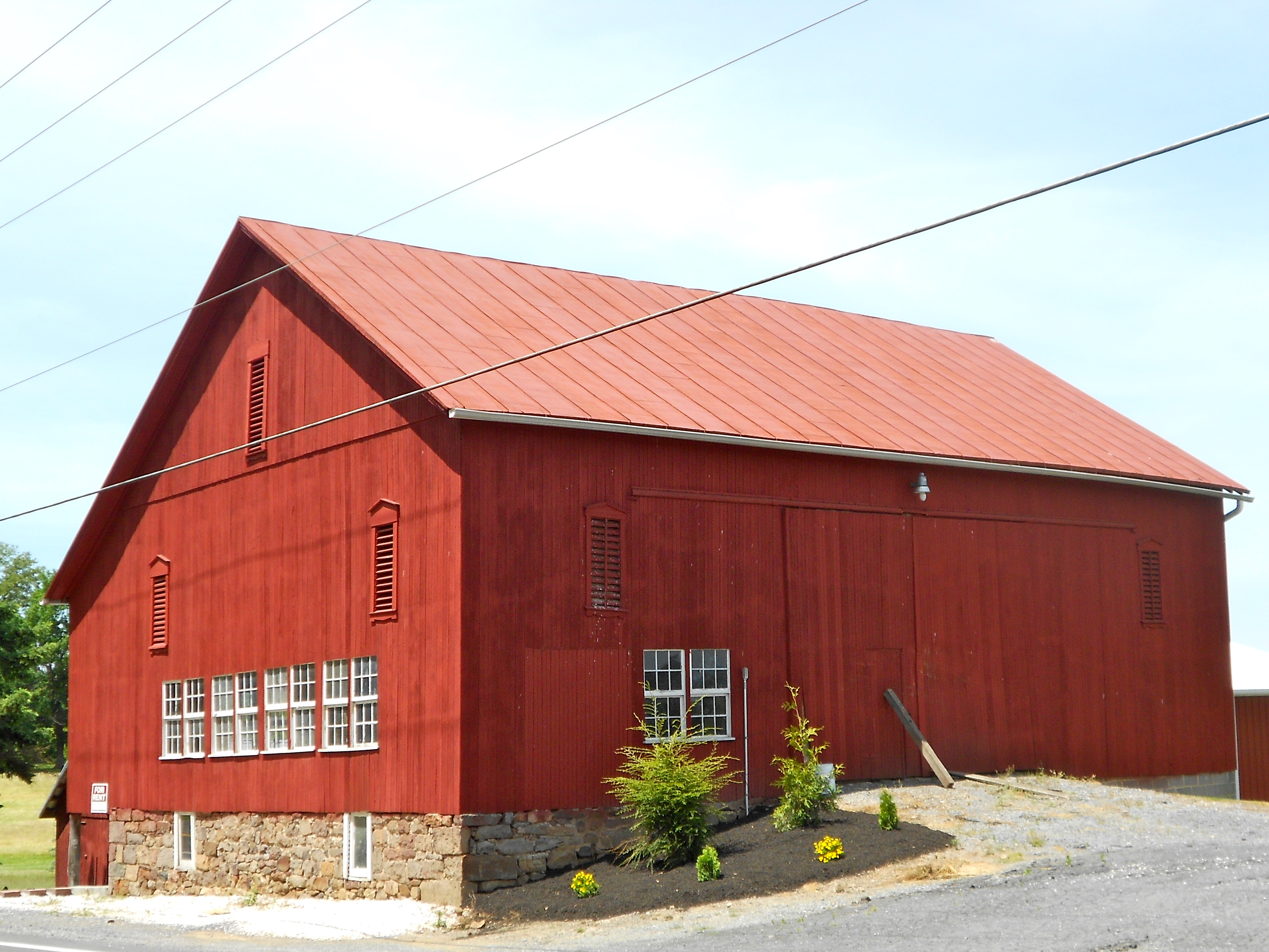
- Barn north of Dillsburg

- Location of Carroll Township in York County, Pennsylvania (bottom) and in Pennsylvania (top)
- Country: United States
- State: Pennsylvania
- County: York
- Settled: 1740
- Incorporated: 1831

Government
  - Type: Board of Supervisors

Area
  - Total: 15.00 sq mi (38.86 km^{2})
  - Land: 15.00 sq mi (38.86 km^{2})
  - Water: 0 sq mi (0.00 km^{2})

Population (2020)
  - Total: 6,861 ▲
  - Estimate (2023): 7,160
  - Density: 419.9/sq mi (162.12/km^{2})
- Time zone: UTC-5 (Eastern (EST))
  - Summer (DST): UTC-4 (EDT)
- Area code: 717
- FIPS code: 42-133-11432
- Website: Carroll Township

Historical population
Census	Pop.	Note	%±
1850	807		—
1860	902		11.8%
1870	898		−0.4%
1880	1,083		20.6%
1890	993		−8.3%
1900	882		−11.2%
1910	828		−6.1%
1920	745		−10.0%
1930	799		7.2%
1940	852		6.6%
1950	1,002		17.6%
1960	1,558		55.5%
1970	2,386		53.1%
1980	3,097		29.8%
1990	3,287		6.1%
2000	4,715		43.4%
2010	5,939		26.0%
2020	6,861		15.5%
2023 (est.)	7,160		4.4%
U.S. Decennial Census

Carroll Township is a township in York County, Pennsylvania, United States. The population was 6,861 at the 2020 census.

== Geography ==
According to the U.S. Census Bureau, the township has a total area of 15.0 square miles (39 km^{2}), all of which is land. It is located along the northern boundary of York County in south-central Pennsylvania and surrounds the borough of Dillsburg.

== Demographics ==
At the 2000 census, there were 4,715 people, 1,686 households, and 1,414 families living in the township. The population density was 314.2 inhabitants per square mile (121.3/km^{2}). There were 1,733 housing units at an average density of 115.5 units per square mile (44.6 units/km^{2}). The racial makeup of the township was 97.69% White, 0.40% African American, 0.06% Native American, 0.83% Asian, 0.04% Pacific Islander, 0.17% from other races, and 0.81% from two or more races. Hispanic or Latino of any race were 0.78%.

Of the 1,686 households, 39.4% had children under the age of 18 living with them, 75.7% were married couples living together, 5.6% had a female householder with no husband present, and 16.1% were non-families. 13.3% of households were one person and 5.6% were one person aged 65 or older. The average household size was 2.76 and the average family size was 3.01.

The age distribution was 26.4% under the age of 18, 5.6% from 18 to 24, 31.2% from 25 to 44, 25.8% from 45 to 64, and 11.0% 65 or older. The median age was 38 years. For every 100 females, there were 98.7 males. For every 100 females age 18 and over, there were 97.6 males.

The median household income was $54,273 and the median family income was $56,023. Males had a median income of $42,237 versus $27,176 for females. The per capita income for the township was $23,481. About 1.7% of families and 3.5% of the population were below the poverty line, including 4.3% of those under age 18 and 9.1% of those age 65 or over.
