= Mike Regan (politician) =

American politician (born 1961)

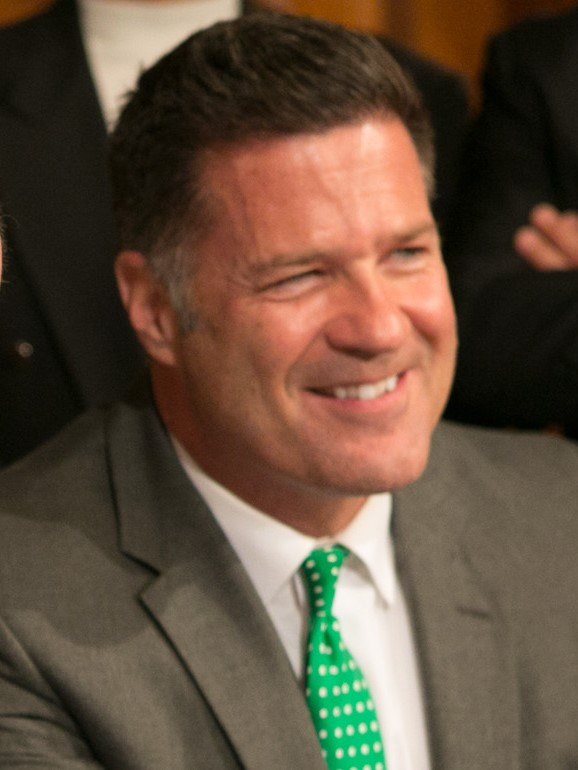

Member of the Pennsylvania Senate from the 31st district
- In office January 3, 2017 – November 30, 2024
- Preceded by: Pat Vance
- Succeeded by: Dawn Keefer

Member of the Pennsylvania House of Representatives from the 92nd district
- In office January 1, 2013 – November 30, 2016
- Preceded by: Scott Perry
- Succeeded by: Dawn Keefer

Personal details
- Born: September 10, 1961 (age 65) Harrisburg, Pennsylvania
- Party: Republican
- Spouse: Fran Regan
- Education: Albright College

Michael Regan (born September 10, 1961) is an American former politician and U.S. Marshal. A Republican, he served as the Pennsylvania State Senator for the 31st district from 2017 to 2024. Prior to that, he served as a member of the Pennsylvania House of Representatives, representing the 92nd district from 2013 to 2016.

== Early life and law enforcement career ==
Regan graduated from Cedar Cliff High School and received a bachelor's degree in criminal justice from Albright College. He began a career in law enforcement, serving as a US Marshal in Miami before returning to fill this same role in South Central Pennsylvania in 1990. In 2002, Regan was appointed as the U.S. Marshal for the United States District Court for the Middle District of Pennsylvania, which required a nomination by President George W. Bush and a confirmation by the United States Senate. In 2011, Regan retired from federal service and was appointed as Deputy Inspector General of Pennsylvania by Governor Tom Corbett.

== Pennsylvania House of Representatives ==
In 2012, Regan was elected to serve the 92nd District in the Pennsylvania House of Representatives. Regan won the Republican primary election with 35.6% of the vote among five candidates. He then defeated a Democrat in the general election with 71.7% of the vote.

In 2014, Regan won reelection to his House seat, running unopposed in both the primary and general elections.

== Pennsylvania State Senate ==
=== 2016 campaign ===
In August 2015, Regan announced that he was running for District 31 of the Pennsylvania Senate. In the Republican primary election, Regan faced dentist Brice Arndt, former NFL player Jon Ritchie, and attorney Scott Harper. Regan won the primary election with 52% of the vote. Many political pundits called the primary campaign one of the most competitive Republican primaries in recent history.

Regan was officially elected to the Pennsylvania Senate in November 2016, defeating Democrat John Bosha with 65% of the vote.

=== Tenure ===
Regan was sworn in as the Senator for Pennsylvania's 31st Senatorial District in January 2017.

Senator Regan currently serves as Chairman of the Veterans Affairs & Emergency Preparedness Committee and Vice Chairman of the Local Government Committee. He is also a member of the Consumer Protection & Professional Licensure Committee, Judiciary Committee, Law & Justice Committee, and the Rules & Executive Nominations Committee.

=== Media ===
In 2021, his wife, Frances Regan, was appointed by Jake Corman to a position on the Gaming Control Board. Fran Regan spent 24 years with the United States Probation Office in the Middle District of Pennsylvania. In her roles with the U.S. Probation Office, she has been involved in conducting background and criminal investigations and preparing presentencing reports for federal judicial officers.

In 2023, Regan physically removed a climate protester from blocking the door to a political event. Michael Bagdes-Canning, 70, who was convicted of obstruction of highways and disorderly conduct, will pay a $200 fine and serve 90 days of unsupervised release. Bagdes-Canning was previously convicted for blocking a revolving door to a Trump rally in 2016 in Western Pa.

=== Committee assignments ===
- Law & Justice, Chair
- Local Government, Vice Chair
- Community, Economic & Recreational Development
- Consumer Protection & Professional Licensure
- Judiciary
- Rules & Executive Nominations

=== Position on cannabis legalization ===
In 2021, Regan announced his intention to pass legislation to legalize recreational cannabis in Pennsylvania. Regan voted for House Bill 1024 in the 2020-2021 legislative session, which permitted medical marijuana companies to remediate products and use additional pesticides among other provisions.
