= Pennsylvania House of Representatives, District 92 =

American legislative district

Pennsylvania's 92nd State House of Representatives district
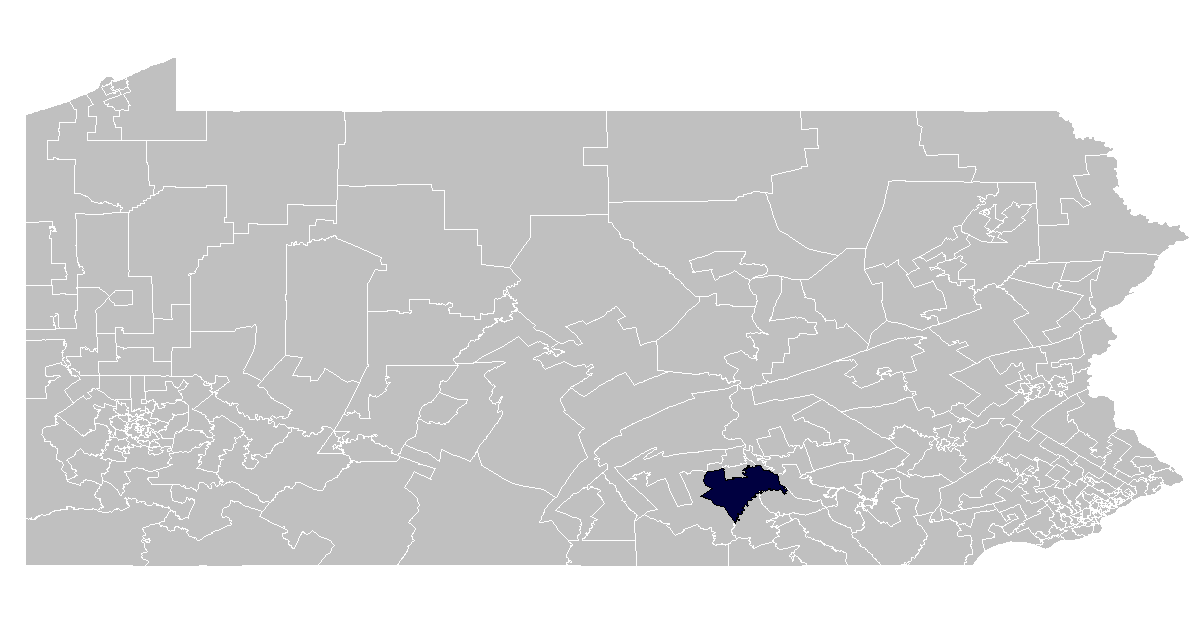
Representative
Marc Anderson; R–Carroll Township, York County
- Population (2022): 66,531

The 92nd Pennsylvania House of Representatives District is located in South Central Pennsylvania and has been represented by Marc Anderson since 2025.

== District profile ==
The 92nd District is located in York County and includes the following areas:

- Carroll Township
- Dillsburg
- Dover Township (part)
  - District 02
- Fairview Township
- Franklintown
- Franklin Township
- Goldsboro
- Lewisberry
- Monaghan Township
- Newberry Township
- Warrington Township
- Washington Township
- Wellsville
- York Haven

== Representatives ==
Representative	Party	Years	District home	Note
Prior to 1969, seats were apportioned by county.
Eugene R. Geesey	Republican	1969 – 1980		
Bruce I. Smith	Republican	1981 – 2006		
Scott Perry	Republican	2007 – 2013		
Mike Regan	Republican	2013 – 2017	Carroll Township	
Dawn Keefer	Republican	2017–2024	Dillsburg	
Marc Anderson	Republican	2025 – present	Carroll Township	Incumbent
