= Scott Perry =

American politician (born 1962)

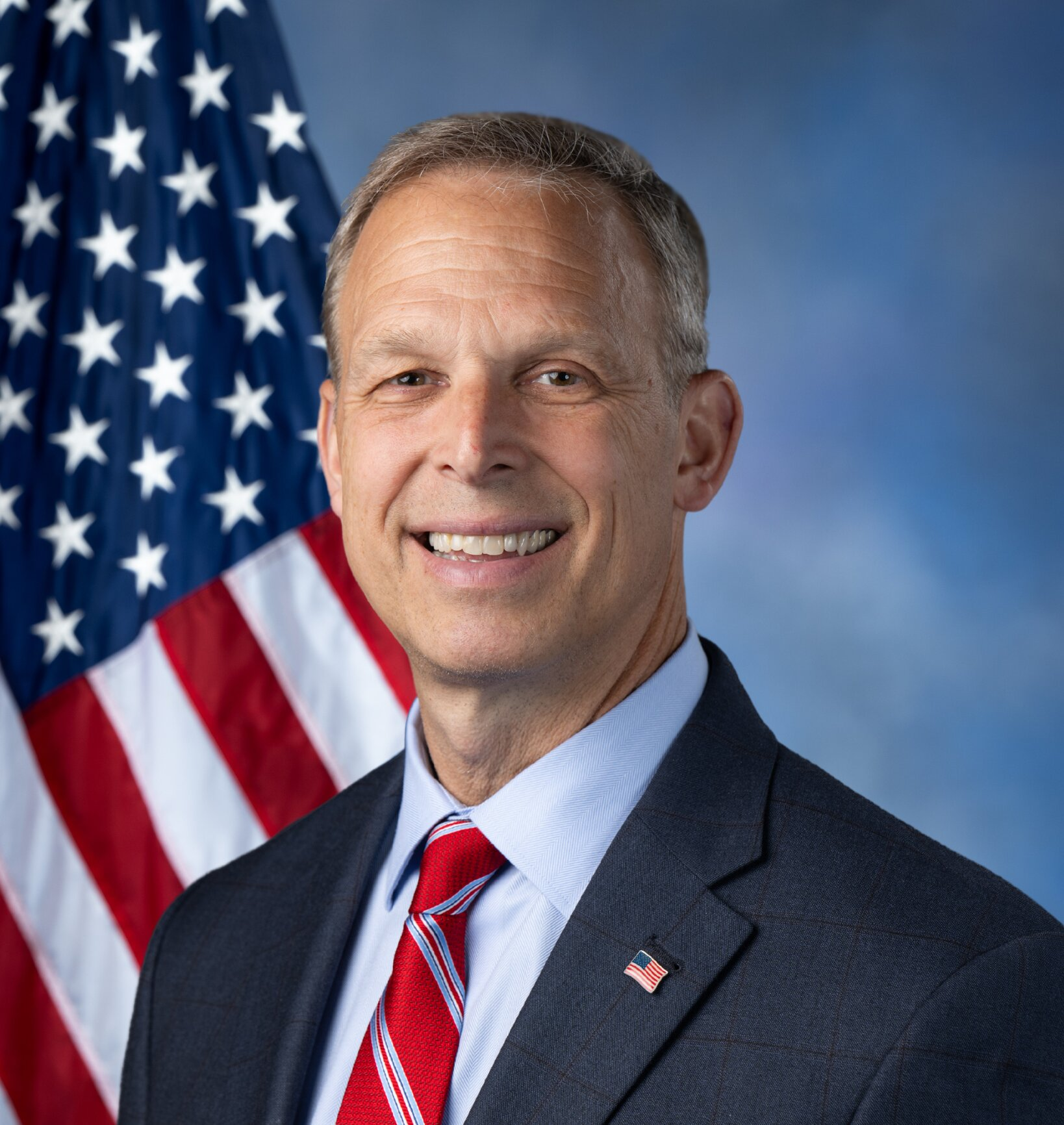
- Official portrait, 2024

Chair of the House Freedom Caucus
- In office January 1, 2022 – January 1, 2024
- Preceded by: Andy Biggs
- Succeeded by: Bob Good

Member of the U.S. House of Representatives from Pennsylvania
- Incumbent
- Assumed office January 3, 2013
- Preceded by: Todd Platts (redistricted)
- Constituency: 4th district (2013–2019); 10th district (2019–present)

Member of the Pennsylvania House of Representatives from the 92nd district
- In office January 2, 2007 – November 30, 2012
- Preceded by: Bruce Smith
- Succeeded by: Mike Regan

Personal details
- Born: Scott Gordon Perry; May 27, 1962 (age 64) San Diego, California, U.S.
- Party: Republican
- Spouse: Christy Perry
- Children: 2
- Education: Pennsylvania State University (BS); United States Army War College (MS)
- Website: House website Campaign website

Military service
- Branch/service: United States Army
- Years of service: 1980–2019
- Rank: Brigadier General
- Unit: Pennsylvania Army National Guard
- Commands: 2nd Battalion, 104th Aviation Regiment; 166th Regiment, Fort Indiantown Gap; 28th Infantry Division
- Battles/wars: Iraq War
- Perry's voice Perry on the 75th anniversary of Indian Rock Dam in York, Pennsylvania. Recorded October 26, 2017

Scott Gordon Perry (born May 27, 1962) is an American politician and retired Army National Guard brigadier general who is the U.S. representative for Pennsylvania's 10th congressional district, serving since 2013. The district, numbered as Pennsylvania's 4th congressional district from 2013 to 2019, is centered on Harrisburg, York, and most of their inner suburbs in Dauphin, Cumberland, and York counties. Perry is a member of the Republican Party.

In November 2021 Perry was elected chair of the House Freedom Caucus, the most conservative House Republican group, and served through 2023.

Perry participated in attempts to overturn the 2020 United States presidential election, including by attempting to replace Pennsylvania's slate of electors.

In the 2026 election, Perry was defeated by Democrat Janelle Stelson.

== Early life and education ==
Scott Gordon Perry was born in San Diego, California, to Cecile Lenig and Jim Perry. Scott's grandparents were Colombian immigrants. His mother was a flight attendant and left an abusive relationship with his father after he was born. She moved with him and his brother to south-central Pennsylvania, when he was seven. After losing her flight attendant job, she worked for a wholesale food company. The family lived first in Harrisburg and then soon afterwards moved to Dillsburg.

Perry and his family were on public assistance for several years during his youth. He was raised in a simple home that initially had no electricity and plumbing, pumping water from a well and cutting firewood with his older brother in the winter. When he was eleven years old, his mother married his step father, Daniel Chimel, who was an airplane pilot and air traffic controller.

In 1980, Perry graduated from Northern High School in Dillsburg and Cumberland-Perry Vo-Tech School in Cumberland County, Pennsylvania. He put himself through college while working full-time, earned his associate's degree from Harrisburg Area Community College, and graduated from Pennsylvania State University with a Bachelor of Science degree in business administration and management in 1991. In 2012, he received a Master of Science degree in strategic planning from the United States Army War College.

Perry began working at age 13, picking fruit at Ashcombe's Farm in Mechanicsburg, Pennsylvania. Since then, he has worked as a mechanic, dock worker, draftsman, and licensed insurance agent, among other jobs.

== Military service ==
=== Army National Guard ===
Perry enlisted in the Pennsylvania Army National Guard in 1980. He attended basic training at Fort Dix, New Jersey, and graduated from Advanced Individual Training at Fort Belvoir, Virginia, as a technical drafting specialist. He graduated from Pennsylvania's Officer Candidate School and was commissioned a second lieutenant in the Field Artillery.

After receiving his commission, Perry qualified as a helicopter pilot in the United States Army Aviation Branch, where he earned qualifications in numerous aircraft (Huey, Cayuse, Kiowa, Cobra, Chinook, Apache, and Blackhawk) and an Instructor Pilot rating. He commanded military units at the company, battalion and brigade levels and served in a variety of staff assignments as he advanced through the ranks, including executive officer of 1st Squadron, 104th Cavalry Regiment during deployment to Bosnia and Herzegovina in 2002–03, and commander of 2nd Battalion (General Support), 104th Aviation Regiment beginning in 2008.

=== Iraq War ===
In 2009–2010, Perry commanded 2nd Battalion, 104th Aviation Regiment during its service in Iraq for Operation Iraqi Freedom. As Task Force Diablo, 2-104th Aviation was credited with flying 1,400 missions, accruing over 10,000 combat flight hours, and transporting over 3 million pounds of cargo and 50,000 soldiers and civilians. Perry flew 44 combat missions in Iraq, and accrued nearly 200 combat flight hours. On Thanksgiving Day 2009, Perry and some of his soldiers participated in a race around the airfield at Camp Adder.

=== Post-Iraq ===
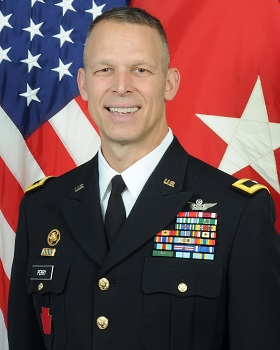
Perry in 2015

After returning from Iraq, Perry was promoted to colonel and assigned to command the Pennsylvania National Guard's 166th Regiment (Regional Training Institute). From 2012 to 2014, he commanded the garrison at the Fort Indiantown Gap National Training Center. In May 2014, Perry was assigned as assistant division commander of the 28th Infantry Division and promoted to brigadier general in November 2015. In May 2016, he was selected as assistant adjutant general at the Pennsylvania National Guard's Joint Force Headquarters. Perry retired from the Pennsylvania National Guard on March 1, 2019.

== Business career ==
After graduating from college, Perry co-founded mechanical contracting business Hydrotech Mechanical Services.

In 2002, Perry was charged with falsifying reports to the Pennsylvania Department of Environmental Protection (DEP). The reports regarded levels of chlorine and acidity at a sewage plant which had a maintenance contract with Hydrotech. He completed the state's Accelerated Rehabilitative Disposition program, and the company paid a $5,000 fine. Perry says he learned of problems at the sewage plant and reported the problems to the DEP; he said, "I saw something going on that I thought was wrong, and as bureaucrats often do, they pursued me in that regard.”

== Government service ==
Before entering politics, Perry chaired the Carroll Township Planning Commission and was a member of the Township Source Water Protection Committee. He chaired the Dillsburg Area Wellhead Protection Advisory Committee and served on the Dillsburg Revitalization Committee. He remains a member of the Jaycees and was once a regional director for the state organization. He is a member of Dillsburg American Legion Post #26, Dillsburg Veterans of Foreign Wars VFW Post #6771, and Lions Club International.

== Pennsylvania House of Representatives ==
=== Elections ===
In 2006, state representative Bruce Smith of Pennsylvania's 92nd House district decided to retire. Perry won the Republican primary with 41% of the vote. He won the general election with 71% of the vote, and took office on January 2, 2007. In 2008, Perry was reelected to a second term unopposed. In 2010, he was reelected to a third term unopposed.

=== Committee assignments ===
- Appropriations
- Rules
- Labor Relations
- Consumer Affairs
- Veterans Affairs and Emergency Preparedness

== U.S. House of Representatives ==
=== Elections ===
==== 2012 ====
In 2012, Perry gave up his state house seat to run for the 4th congressional district. The district had previously been the 19th district, represented by six-term incumbent Republican Todd Platts, who was giving up the seat to honor a self-imposed term limit. In 2010, when Platts wanted to become U.S. comptroller general, he spoke to Perry about running for the seat.

Perry won a seven-way primary with over 50% of the vote. Although he was outspent nearly 2 to 1 in the campaign, he beat his closest competitor with nearly three times as many votes. Political newcomer Harry Perkinson, an engineer, advanced in a two-way Democratic primary. Perry won the general election, 60%–34%.

==== 2014 ====
In 2014, Perry was unopposed in the Republican primary, and the former Harrisburg mayor, Linda D. Thompson, was unopposed in the Democratic primary. Perry won the general election, 75%–25%.

==== 2016 ====
Perry won the 2016 election with no primary challenge and no official Democratic opponent. Joshua Burkholder of Harrisburg, a political novice, withdrew from the Democratic primary after too many signatures on his qualifying petition were successfully challenged. His subsequent write-in candidacy won the Democratic primary, but he was unaffiliated in the general election. Perry defeated Burkholder, 66%–34%.

==== 2018 ====
After ruling the state's congressional map unconstitutional as a gerrymander, the Pennsylvania Supreme Court issued a new map for the 2018 elections. Perry's district was renumbered the 10th and made significantly more compact than its predecessor. It lost most of the more rural and Republican areas of York County to the neighboring 11th district (the old 16th). To make up for the loss in population, it was pushed slightly to the north, absorbing the remainder of Democratic-leaning Dauphin County that had not been in the old 4th. On paper, the new district was less Republican than its predecessor. Had the district existed in 2016, Donald Trump would have won it with 52% of the vote to Hillary Clinton's 43%; Trump carried the old 4th with 58% of the vote.

Pastor and Army veteran George Scott won the Democratic primary by a narrow margin and opposed Perry in the general election for the reconfigured 10th. The two debated in October before Perry won with 51.3% of the vote to Scott's 48.7%, with the new district boundaries taking effect in 2019. Perry held on by winning the district's share of his home county, York County, by 11,600 votes.

==== 2020 ====
In 2020, Perry had no Republican primary challenger, and the Pennsylvania auditor general, Eugene DePasquale, won a two-way Democratic primary. Perry was reelected with 53.3% of the vote in the general election.

==== 2022 ====
In 2022, Perry defeated Democratic nominee Shamaine Daniels with 54% of the vote.

==== 2024 ====
On January 2, 2024, a lawsuit seeking to bar Perry from the 2024 ballot via Section 3 of the 14th Amendment to the US Constitution was filed by Democratic activist Gene Stilp. The suit was withdrawn after the U.S. Supreme Court ruled in March that only Congress can disqualify federal candidates. Perry faced Democratic nominee Janelle Stelson in the general election. The race was closely watched because it took place in a swing district in a swing state. Perry ultimately defeated Stelson with 50.6% of the vote.

==== 2026 ====
Perry ran for reelection in 2026; losing by over ten percentage points in a rematch with his 2024 Democratic challenger Janelle Stelson.

=== Tenure ===
Perry is a member of the Freedom Caucus. In November 2021, he was elected to chair the group, succeeding Andy Biggs in January 2022; Bob Good succeeded Perry as chair in January 2024.

In October 2017, in the aftermath of Hurricane Maria, Perry accused CNN anchor Chris Cuomo of exaggerating the crisis in Puerto Rico.

In January 2018, Perry suggested that ISIS might have been involved in the 2017 Las Vegas shooting. ISIS claimed responsibility for the attack, but authorities have maintained that gunman Stephen Paddock acted alone.

In December 2019, Perry was one of 195 Republicans to vote against both articles of impeachment against President Trump.

Perry participated in attempts to overturn the 2020 United States presidential election, including by attempting to replace Pennsylvania's electors. The House committee investigating the January 6 Capitol attack sought to question Perry about his role in efforts to install Assistant Attorney General Jeffrey Clark as acting attorney general and his introduction of Clark to President Trump. Perry declined both the committee's initial request and subsequent subpoena, leading to his referral to the House Ethics Panel after the November 2022 elections.

In March 2021, Perry voted against the American Rescue Plan Act of 2021. The bill's main purpose was stated to be economic relief during the COVID-19 pandemic, but Perry claimed the majority of its funds were dedicated to partisan political efforts by the Democratic Party.

In June 2021, Perry was one of 21 House Republicans to vote against a resolution to give the Congressional Gold Medal to police officers who defended the U.S. Capitol on January 6. He cosponsored a bill, introduced the same day, that would give the same medal to police officers without mentioning the attack.

In July 2022, Perry was among 47 House Republicans to vote for the Respect for Marriage Act, which would protect the right to same-sex marriage at a federal level by repeal the Defense of Marriage Act. Perry said, "Agree or disagree with same-sex marriage, my vote affirmed my long-held belief that Americans who enter into legal agreements deserve to live their lives without the threat that our federal government will dissolve what they've built." In December 2022, Perry voted against the final version of the bill. He said his initial "yes" vote was a mistake based on a lack of time to review the legislation, claiming that his initial reasoning was primarily focused on protecting interracial marriage at the federal level, but that he did not want to "vote against traditional marriage."

In May 2024, CNN obtained a recording in which Perry told a closed-door briefing of the House Oversight Committee that Ku Klux Klan is "the military wing of the Democratic party" and that migrants coming to the U.S. "have no interest in being Americans." Perry said, "Replacement theory is real. They added white to it to stop everybody from talking about it," in reference to the Great Replacement conspiracy theory in the United States.

In June 2024, Perry shared an antisemitic meme on his Facebook page originating from the Freedom for Humanity mural, which depicts stereotypical Jewish bankers with hooked noses. After being asked about the meme by Jewish Insider, Perry deleted the post.

After voting for the initial version of the One Big Beautiful Bill Act, Perry supported Elon Musk's criticism that "this massive, outrageous, pork-filled Congressional spending bill is a disgusting abomination." Perry questioned House leadership, noting that the House expected the Senate to make major improvements to the bill. In July 2025, Perry voted for passage of the final version of the bill.

In June 2026, Perry, alongside Representative Keith Self, introduced a resolution to repeal the Seventeenth Amendment to the United States Constitution, which allows for the direct selection of U.S. senators by voters. Perry and Self's resolution would eliminate direct elections for the U.S. senate, instead returning to the state legislatures the appointment of senators. The resolution was introduced days after Perry criticized the U.S. Senate for not passing the SAVE America Act, with Perry accusing the Senate of "dereliction of duty".

==== Involvement in attempts to overturn the 2020 presidential election ====
According to The Philadelphia Inquirer, Perry was "one of the leading figures in the effort to throw out Pennsylvania's votes in the 2020 presidential election."

After the election, Perry promoted claims of election fraud. Days after the election, in text messages to White House chief of staff Mark Meadows, Perry suggested John Ratcliffe should direct the National Security Agency to investigate alleged Chinese hacking. Perry also asserted "the Brits" were behind a conspiracy to manipulate voting machines and that CIA director Gina Haspel was covering it up. The next month, he sent Meadows a link to a YouTube video that asserted voting machines had been manipulated via satellite from Italy; Meadows later sent the video to former acting attorney general Richard Donoghue, seeking an investigation. Donoghue told the committee the contentions in the video, originating from QAnon and far-right platforms which had been brought to the White House, were "pure insanity."

Perry was one of 126 Republican House members to sign an amicus brief in support of Texas v. Pennsylvania, a lawsuit filed at the United States Supreme Court contesting the results of the 2020 presidential election, in which Joe Biden defeated Trump.

Perry reportedly played a key role in a December 2020 crisis at the Justice Department, in which Trump considered firing acting attorney general Jeffrey A. Rosen and replacing him with Jeffrey Clark, the acting chief of the Civil Division of the DOJ. According to The Los Angeles Times, Perry "prompted" Trump to consider the replacement. The New York Times reported that Perry introduced Clark to Trump because Clark's "openness to conspiracy theories about election fraud presented Mr. Trump with a welcome change from Rosen, who stood by the results of the election and had repeatedly resisted the president's efforts to undo them."

Before the certification of the electoral college vote on January 6, Perry and Clark reportedly discussed a plan in which the Justice Department would send Georgia legislators a letter suggesting the DOJ had evidence of voter fraud and suggesting the legislators invalidate Georgia's electoral votes, even though the DOJ had investigated reports of fraud but found nothing significant, as attorney general Bill Barr had publicly announced weeks earlier. Clark drafted a letter to Georgia officials and presented it to Rosen and his deputy Donoghue. It claimed the DOJ had "identified significant concerns that may have impacted the outcome of the election in multiple States". It urged the Georgia legislature to convene a special session for the "purpose of considering issues pertaining to the appointment of Presidential Electors." Rosen and Donoghue rejected the proposal.

In August 2021, CNN reported that Ratcliffe had briefed top Justice Department officials that no evidence had been found of any foreign powers' interference with voting machines. Clark reportedly was concerned that intelligence community analysts were withholding information and believed that Perry and others knew more about possible foreign interference. Clark requested authorization from Rosen and Donoghue for another briefing from Ratcliffe, asserting hackers had found that "a Dominion machine accessed the Internet through a smart thermostat with a net connection trail leading back to China."

On January 6, 2021, Perry joined Missouri senator Josh Hawley in objecting to counting Pennsylvania's electoral votes in the 2020 presidential election. During the storming of the U.S. Capitol that day, Perry and his congressional colleagues were ushered to a secure location.

On December 20, 2021, House Select Committee on the January 6 Attack chairman Bennie Thompson wrote to Perry asking him to provide information about his involvement in the effort to install Clark as acting attorney general. Thompson believed Perry had been involved in the effort to install Clark, given previous testimony from Rosen and Donoghue, as well as communications between Perry and Meadows. Perry declined the request the next day, asserting the committee was illegitimate. Among several text messages to Meadows the committee released on December 14 was one attributed to a "member of Congress" dated January 5 that read "Please check your signal", a reference to the encrypted messaging system Signal. In his letter to Perry, Thompson mentioned evidence that Perry had communicated with Meadows using Signal, though Perry denied sending that particular text message. CNN acquired and published additional Meadows text messages in April 2022 that confirmed Perry had sent that message.

On June 9, 2022, Select Committee member Liz Cheney asserted that Perry requested a presidential pardon from Trump in the weeks after the January 6 attack. Perry denied Cheney's assertion, calling it "an absolute, shameless, and soulless lie". On June 23, 2022, the Select Committee broadcast testimony from Cassidy Hutchinson, a former aide to Meadows, who said Perry was one of several lawmakers who contacted her to "inquire about preemptive pardons." In response, Perry said he had never spoken with any White House staff about a pardon for him or any other members of Congress.

In August 2022, Perry reported that three FBI agents had seized his cellphone after presenting him with a warrant. He called the seizure an "unnecessary and aggressive action". Perry asked Chief Judge of the D.C. District Court Beryl Howell to prevent investigators from accessing 2,219 documents stored on his phone, citing the Speech or Debate Clause of the U.S. Constitution. On February 24, 2023, Howell unsealed her December 2022 ruling, which found Perry had an "astonishing view" of his immunity and ordered him to disclose 2,055 messages, including all 960 of his contacts with members of the executive branch. The ruling was appealed to a three-judge panel of the D.C. Circuit Court of Appeals, which in September 2023 directed Howell's successor Jeb Boasberg to scrutinize all 2,055 messages; he ruled in December 2023 that investigators could see 1,659 messages and Perry could withhold 396 others.

=== Committee assignments ===
- Committee on Foreign Affairs
  - Subcommittee on Asia, the Pacific and Nonproliferation
  - Subcommittee on Oversight and Investigations
- Committee on Transportation and Infrastructure
  - Subcommittee on Aviation
  - Subcommittee on Railroads, Pipelines, and Hazardous Materials

=== Caucus memberships ===
- Freedom Caucus (former chair)
- Second Amendment Caucus
- Congressional Caucus on Turkey and Turkish Americans
- Congressional Motorcycle Caucus
- Congressional Taiwan Caucus
- Sharia-Free America Caucus

== Political positions ==
=== Foreign policy ===
In March 2021, Perry was one of 14 House Republicans who voted against a measure condemning the Myanmar coup d'état, which overwhelmingly passed.

In July 2021, Perry voted against the bipartisan ALLIES Act, which would increase by 8,000 the number of special immigrant visas for Afghan allies of the U.S. military during its invasion of Afghanistan while also reducing some application requirements that caused long application backlogs; the bill passed in the House 407–16.

In April 2022, Perry voted against a bill to encourage documentation and preservation of Russian war crimes during its invasion of Ukraine.

In 2023, Perry was among 47 Republicans to vote in favor of H.Con.Res. 21, which directed President Joe Biden to remove U.S. troops from Syria within 180 days.

In 2024, Perry voted against two multi-billion-dollar foreign aid packages, which included money for Taiwan, Ukraine, and Israel. Perry opposed House Speaker Mike Johnson's tactic of bundling aid bills, saying he preferred single-subject bills. Perry also objected to $9 billion in humanitarian aid for Gaza, citing the Israeli government's claim that Hamas has been stealing aid intended for Gaza's civilians.

In 2025, amid efforts by DOGE to shut down USAID, Perry claimed that USAID had funded Nigerian terrorist group Boko Haram. United States Ambassador to Nigeria Richard Mills said "there is absolutely no evidence" for Perry's claim. Nigerian representative Akin Rotimi announced a parliamentary inquiry into Perry's allegations.

Perry said in April 2026 that the war with Iran is justified. In June 2026, he voted against a war powers resolution that would have limited President Trump's ability to wage war in Iran until congressional consent had been obtained.

=== Climate change ===
Perry frequently opposes proposed climate change policies in Congress, including policies which have support within the GOP. During 2023 testimony before the Foreign Affairs committee by the U.S. special presidential envoy for climate, Perry presented charts that he said showed climate change had stopped since 2016. This position is sharply at odds with the scientific consensus on climate change.

=== Abortion policy ===
Perry opposes a federal abortion ban. He has "repeatedly stated his support for IVF, and says that he maintains his personal pro-life stance while continuing to leave the issue to the states."

=== Islam ===
In 2015, Perry claimed on Frank Gaffney's radio show that the Obama administration was collaborating with ISIS. Perry refused to retract this claim but follow-up news reports indicated that he had "softened" the charge. Perry has made multiple guest appearances on Gaffney's radio show; Gaffney is the founder of the Center for Security Policy, which is designated an anti-Muslim hate group by the Southern Poverty Law Center.

In 2016, Perry met with Brigitte Gabriel, founder of ACT for America, an anti-Muslim organization designated as a hate group by the Southern Poverty Law Center. Perry called Gabriel "someone who demands (and deserves) to be heard about the security of our nation." Following criticism from a Gettysburg College professor for meeting with Gabriel, Perry denounced the SPLC as an "extremist left-wing organization" and denied that ACT for America was anti-Muslim, saying "One person's hate group is another person's patriot." Perry spoke at ACT for America's national conference where he praised Gabriel as a "hero".

In 2017, Perry criticized the FBI for rescinding training material during the Obama administration that had been characterized as spreading anti-Muslim stereotypes.

In 2021, when Representative Ilhan Omar, who is Muslim, introduced a bill to combat Islamophobia, Perry falsely accused Omar of being "affiliated with" unspecified terrorist organizations. Perry's remark was struck from the congressional record.

In 2025, Perry cosponsored legislation with Chip Roy to oppose Sharia, or Islamic law. The legislation would mandate the deportation of "Sharia-law-adherent aliens" and ban them from entering the United States.

In January 2026, Perry was named a founding member of the Sharia Free America Caucus in Congress, which seeks to ban Sharia law. He said, "We welcome oppressed people from around the globe to enhance and participate in the self governance model that is America; we did not, however, invite them to leave their theological oppression abroad to come and conquer America under the flag of violent submission and oppression that is Sharia law." The Council on American–Islamic Relations (CAIR), a civil rights organization, quoted Perry and other caucus members in a statement designating the Sharia Free America Caucus an anti-Muslim hate group and saying the caucus's agenda "would effectively ban the practice of the world's second largest religion in the United States.

== Personal life ==
Perry and his wife, Christy reside in northern York County. They have two children.

== See also ==
- List of Hispanic and Latino Americans in the United States Congress

U.S. House of Representatives
Preceded by Jason Altmire	Member of the U.S. House of Representatives from Pennsylvania's 4th congressional district 2013–2019	Succeeded by Madeleine Dean
Preceded by Tom Marino	Member of the U.S. House of Representatives from Pennsylvania's 10th congressional district 2019–present	Incumbent
Party political offices
Preceded by Andy Biggs	Chair of the House Freedom Caucus; 2022–2024	Succeeded by Bob Good
U.S. order of precedence (ceremonial)
Preceded by Grace Meng	United States representatives by seniority 109th	Succeeded by Scott Peters
