= Shelhamer =

Shelhamer is a surname. Notable people with the surname include:

- Alfred Shelhamer (1918-1986), American Thoroughbred horse racing jockey
- Kent Shelhamer (1924–2024), American politician
- Mark Shelhamer (fl. 1982–2021), American human spaceflight researcher
