= Roller coaster train =

Vehicle on an amusement park ride

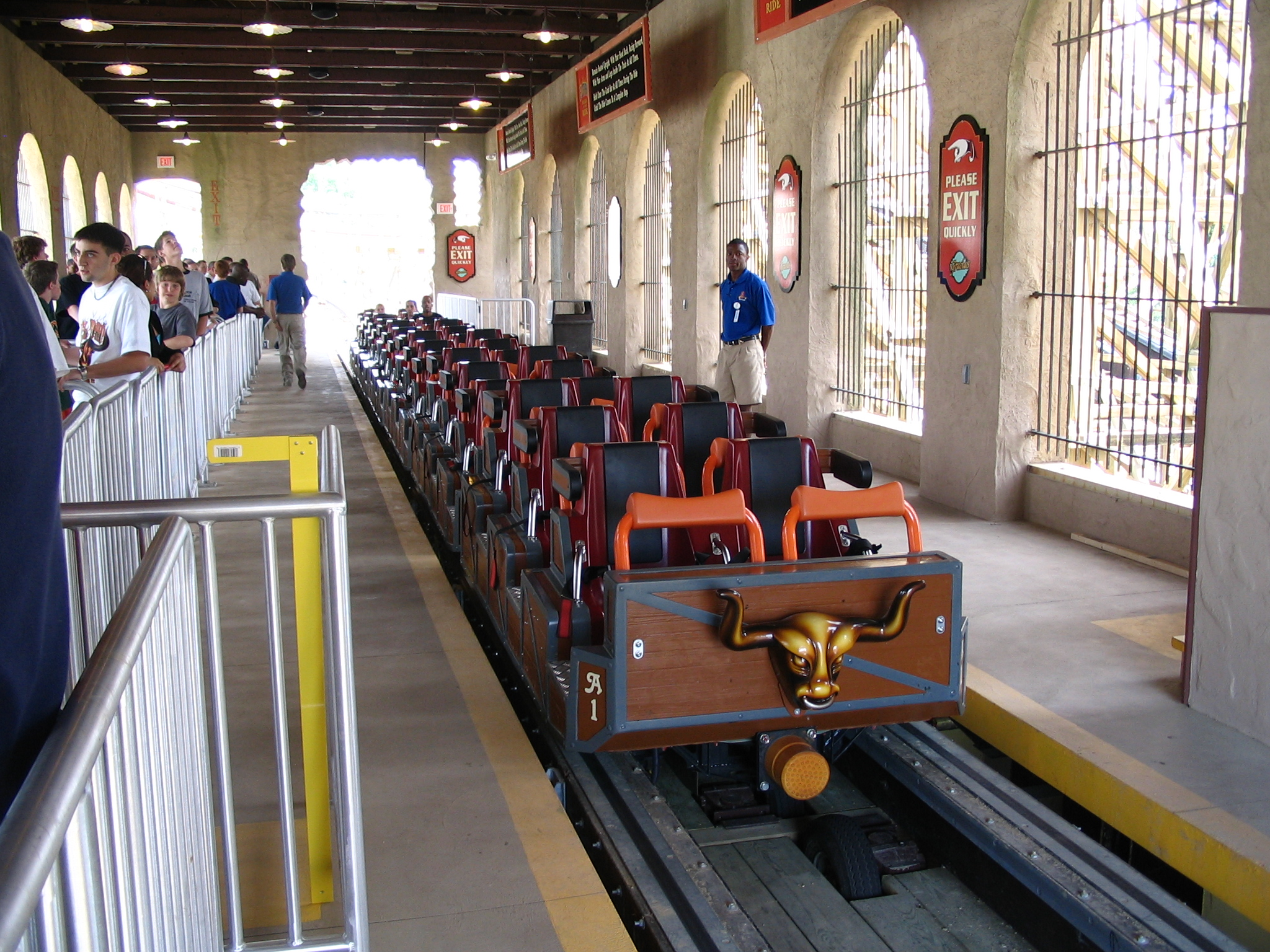
El Toro, a wooden roller coaster at Six Flags Great Adventure in New Jersey, uses traditional lap bars in its trains

A roller coaster train is a vehicle made up of two or more carts coupled together by specialized joints which transports passengers around a roller coaster's track. Roller coasters typically have multiple safety features, including specialized wheel assemblies and restraints. The rider vehicle is called a train because the carts are connected in a chain and follow each other along the track, just like a railroad train. Individual carts vary in design and can carry just one to eight or more passengers each.

== Operation ==
Many roller coasters operate more than one train, and sometimes operate several simultaneously. The average coaster will operate two trains at a time, with one train loading and unloading while the other train runs the ride's course.

== Basic safety features ==
=== Wheels ===
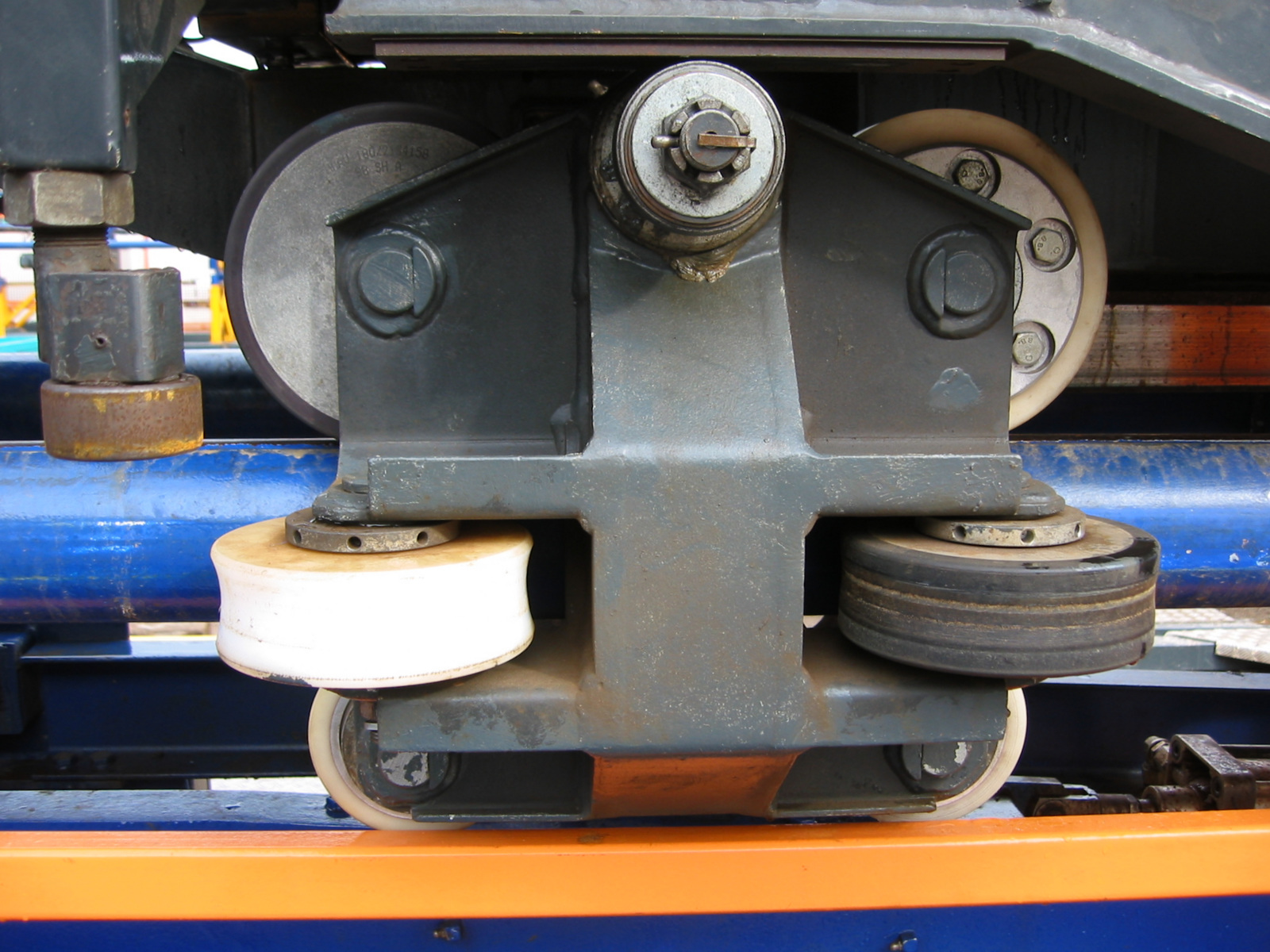
Wheel assembly of the Spinning Racer coaster at Fantasy Island

Roller coaster trains have wheels that run on the top of the track (road or running wheels), the sides of the track (side-friction or guide wheels), and underneath the track (upstop, underfriction, uplift, or underlocking wheels). Altogether, these lock the train to the tracks and prevent it from derailing. The side-friction wheels can be mounted on the outside or inside of the track, depending on the manufacturer (outside-mounted wheels are more common). The wheels are sometimes located between the carts, as well as at the front or rear of the entire train.

=== Restraints ===
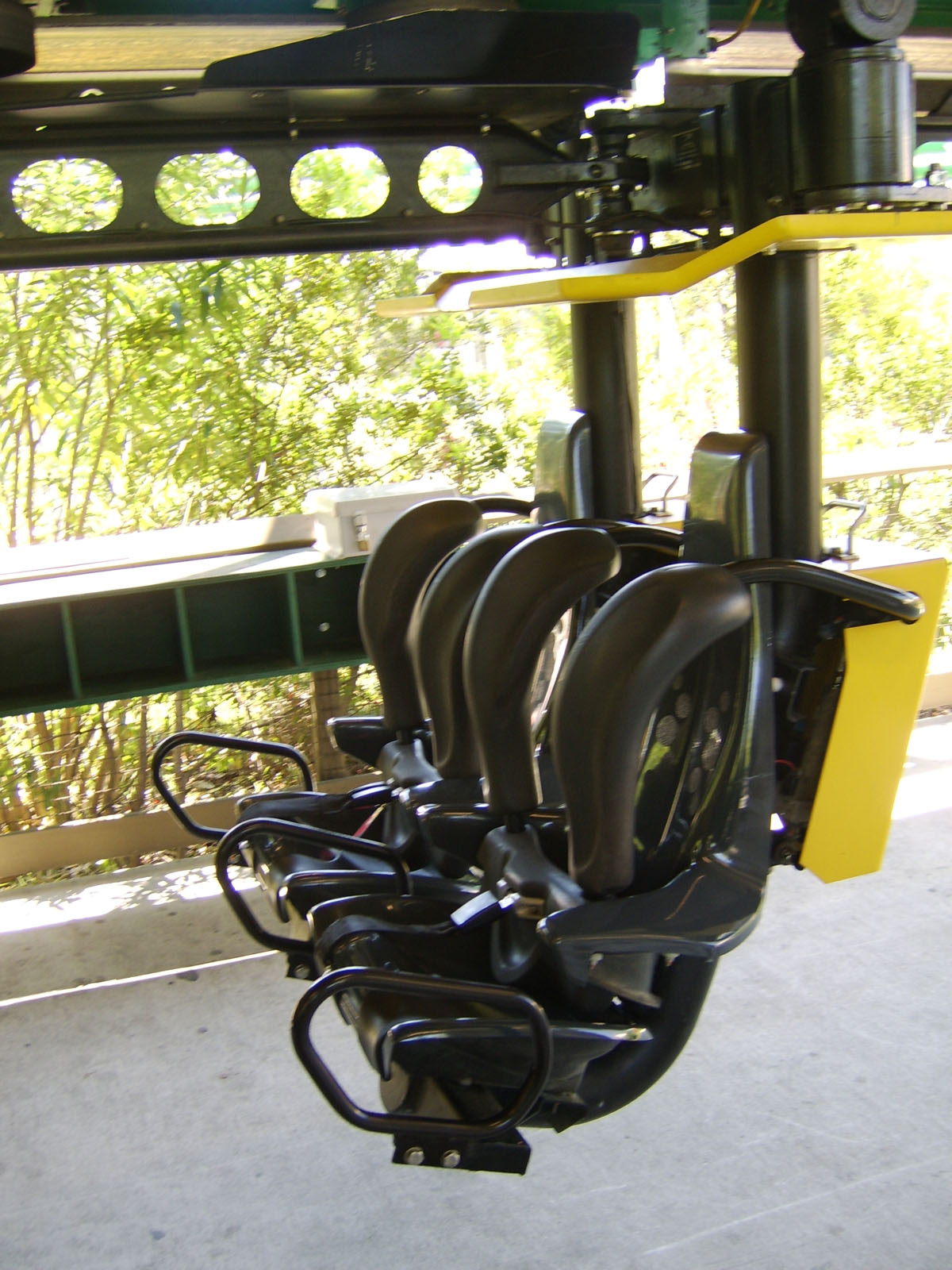
An inverted roller coaster car with over-the-shoulder restraints

Roller coaster trains also have restraints that keep passengers in their seats. There are two major types of restraints: lap bars and over-the-shoulder restraints. Restraints always use two locking mechanisms for redundancy, one on each side. If one fails, the restraint will remain locked through the other one. Most modern roller coasters also have lap seat belts that can act as secondary safety devices.

Lap bars were first seen in 1907 on Coney Island's Drop the Dip. Lap bar restraints consist of a padded bar mounted to the floor or side of the train that swings backwards or sideways into the rider's lap. These restraints are more commonly found on roller coasters that lack inversions, although some inverting roller coasters, such as those created by Schwarzkopf and by Rocky Mountain Coasters, safely operate without the need for shoulder restraints. Lap bar restraints like buzz bars (named for the buzzing sound they make when locked and unlocked) give the rider a greater sense of movement in the train than over-the-shoulder restraints.

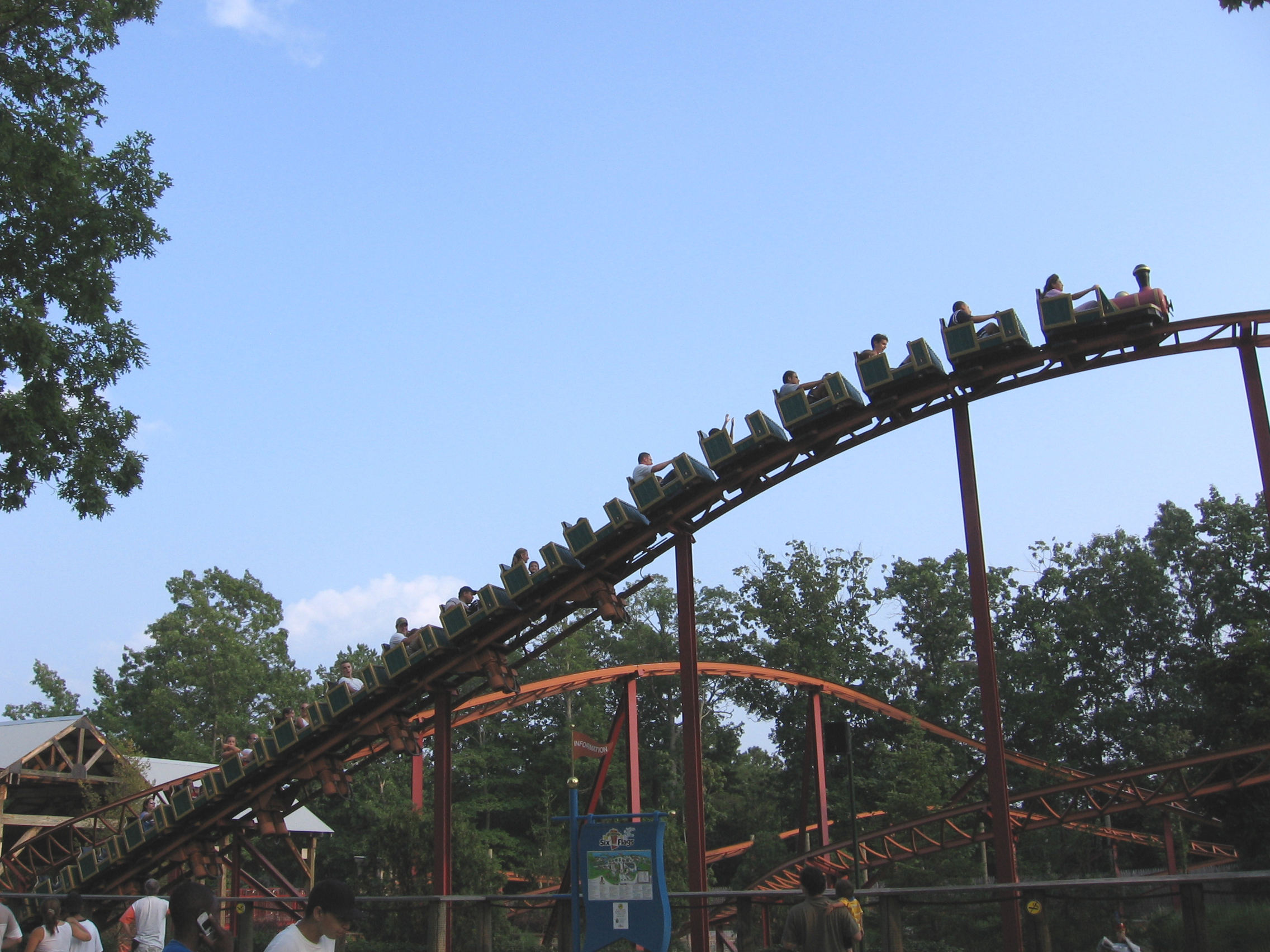
Harley Quinn Crazy Train at Six Flags Great Adventure has a train composed of 20 cars

Over-the-shoulder restraints consist of a u-shaped padded bar mounted to the top of each seat that swings downward into a rider's body. Roller coasters that have inversions usually have this type of restraint. Additionally, almost all inverted, floorless, Dive, and flying roller coasters have this type of restraint, since it is difficult to mount a lap bar restraint to the types of trains these rides utilize. One disadvantage of over-the-shoulder restraints is that they can provide discomfort to the rider as their head bangs against each side of the restraint, especially on rougher roller coasters. Some rides with over-the-shoulder restraints, like Maverick at Cedar Point, require that guests remove any earrings before riding to prevent injuries.

There are some operating roller coasters that do not have any restraint systems, save for a grab bar for riders to hold onto. Most coasters of this style opened in the early 1900s. Rollo Coaster at Idlewild and Soak Zone was a good example of this prior to the 2016 incident which mandated its train receive lap bars and seatbelts. Until early 2006, Nickelodeon Streak at Pleasure Beach Resort (better known as Blackpool Pleasure Beach) also operated without any restraints, although seatbelts were added to the ride in the 2007 season.
