= Pennsylvania Freedom Caucus =

US ultra-conservative political group

- Chair: Robert Leadbeter
- Vice Chair: Dave Zimmerman
- Founded: December 8, 2022; 3 years ago
- Ideology: Limited government; Right-wing populism
- Political position: Right-wing to far-right
- National affiliation: State Freedom Caucus Network
- Seats in the House Republican Conference: 16 / 97 (Note: Total representation may not be shown as some members are anonymous)
- Seats in the State House: 16 / 203
- Seats in the Senate Republican Conference: 1 / 27
- Seats in the State Senate: 1 / 50

The Pennsylvania Freedom Caucus is a legislative caucus in the Pennsylvania General Assembly that promotes ultra-conservative policies like limited governance, personal freedom, and a traditional social agenda on issues such as crime, transgender issues, public welfare, and abortion. It is affiliated with the State Freedom Caucus Network, modeled after the U.S. House Freedom Caucus, and more conservative than the majority Republican caucus. Its members all belong to the Republican Party.

== History ==
In an effort to promote ultra-conservative policies in state legislatures, the Conservative Partnership Institute launched the State Freedom Caucus Network, which provides training and resources to state lawmakers who launch or join a Freedom Caucus in their state legislature. In December 2022, the Caucus launched with the support of Pennsylvania Congressman Scott Perry. The state caucus is modeled after the Freedom Caucus in the U.S. House of Representatives. It claimed to have 23 charter members at the time of its launch.

Scott said the Caucus is important for the advancement of conservatism in the state legislature, criticizing some Republicans for failing to advance the party's policies and "negotiat[ing] backroom deals with far-left extremists." The founding Chairwoman, then-Representative Dawn Keefer, positioned the Caucus as protecting personal freedom, "economic aspirations without undue government influence, and the right to live and raise a family without Big Brother of government usurping individual liberties."

== Political positions and involvement ==
=== Intra-party relationship ===
The Caucus has been criticized by more moderate Republicans as jeopardizing the ability of Republicans to win state-wide races, like those for Governor or U.S. Senate. Spotlight PA, a local newspaper, reported one anonymous Republican Party insider as saying the Caucus fails to "read the room" following Pennsylvania Republican's defeat in the 2022 midterm elections and giving ammunition for Democrats to use against the party due to its staunchly conservative agenda. Former state Representative Todd Stephens argued that "far-right" Republicans made it difficult for all Republicans to earn the votes of suburban and urban voters who are skeptical of the Caucus' views.

On the other hand, Caucus members, like Rep. Aaron Bernstine, argue that the Party needs to "do a better job of putting words into action" and "be the party of fiscal responsibility . . . school choice . . . and individual freedom." rather than delaying controversial actions in fear of backlash.

=== Election issues ===
In the lead up to the 2024 presidential election, the Caucus echoed election fraud allegations by then-candidate Donald Trump. The Caucus claimed the York County Office of Elections and Voter Registration "uncovered thousands of suspected fraudulent registrations and mail ballot applications." A later investigation of the applications led to 24% being denied, with 85% of those being duplicated registration requests. The Pennsylvania Attorney General reported that similar attempts at fraudulent voter registration were detected and defeated in Lancaster, Berks, and Monroe counties. In January 2026, multiple canvassers were charged with various crimes involving public records tampering, providing false statements, and applying for fraudulent voter registration forms.

In the wake of the 2024 election, Keefer and 23 other Republican lawmakers filed suit against then-President Joe Biden and Governor Josh Shapiro for alleged violations of the federal Constitution's "time, place, and manner" clause (Article 1, Section 4), which delegates the regulation of congressional elections to state lawmakers. The lawmakers argued Biden's Executive Order 14019 violated the Clause by directing state executive agencies' handling of voter registration materials and efforts. They also argued Shapiro's Executive Order instituting automatic voter registration overstepped the Governor's authority and infringed on the separation of powers. A U.S. federal district court dismissed the suit in March 2024, and the U.S. Supreme Court declined to take up the case upon appeal by the Republicans.

Following the suit's dismissal, the Caucus requested the state's Auditor General audit the state's automatic voter registration program "to assess whether the Department of State is maintaining an accurate voter registration database . . ." and accused the program of allowing non-citizens to register to vote. In April 2026, the Auditor General found that the automatic registration system works well, but needs to be reinforced against human error. The audit also discovered once instance of a non-citizen being registered to vote, but was immediately flagged by the non-citizen and corrected.

=== American Library Association ===
In July 2023, the Caucus urged libraries in the state to end any connection with the American Library Association after the group elected Emily Drabinski , a self-described Marxist, its president. The Caucus called Drabinski's election "an affront to our constitutional republic."

=== Taxation ===
The Caucus supported efforts to reduce taxes on overtime pay, finding support from Democratic lawmakers in the state House. Caucus Chairman Rep. Robert Leadbeter said he welcomes "any opportunity to reduce the tax burden of hard working Pennsylvanians . . ."

=== Transgender issues ===
During the 2023–24 legislative session, the Caucus threatened to stall funding for in-state tuition subsidies to Penn State University due to Penn State Health hospitals providing puberty-blockers and other transgender medical interventions for minors under the age of ten. Hospital officials disputed that claim, arguing its puberty blockers are only given to those under ten experiencing premature puberty rather than gender dysphoria. Non-Freedom Caucus Republicans, like Rep. Tom Mehaffie, argued that the connection between Penn State Health hospitals and Penn State University was too weak to support the Caucus' objection, calling the defunding effort a "witch hunt."

In March 2024, the Caucus supported legislation introduced by Caucus member Rep. Joe D'Orsie that would protect a parent or teacher's refusal to use a child's preferred pronouns, prohibiting a suit or other disciplinary action. D'Orsie said the bill is a necessary step to protect freedom of speech. Leadbeter said the bill protects parental rights "from the government officials and bureaucrats pushing divisive agendas and undermining our conservative values. . ."

== Membership ==
Membership to the caucus is invitation only and undisclosed, though members may voluntarily identify themselves.

=== Current members ===
- Rep. Robert Leabeter – Chairman
- Rep. David Rowe – Vice Chair
- Rep. Marc Anderson
- Rep. Scott Barger
- Rep. Josh Bashline
- Rep. Aaron Bernstine
- Rep. Joe D'Orsie
- Rep. Wendy Fink
- Rep. Barb Gleim
- Rep. Mike Jones
- Rep. Tom Jones
- Former Rep. Frank Ryan
- Rep. Jamie Walsh
- Rep. Dave Zimmerman

=== Former members ===
- Sen. Dawn Keefer – Founding Chairwoman
- Rep. Stephanie Borowicz
- Rep. Kathy Rapp
- Former Rep. Paul Schemel
- Former Rep. Stephenie Scialabba
- Rep. Perry Stambaugh
- Rep. Eric Weaknecht
