= Rollo Coaster =

Roller coaster in United States

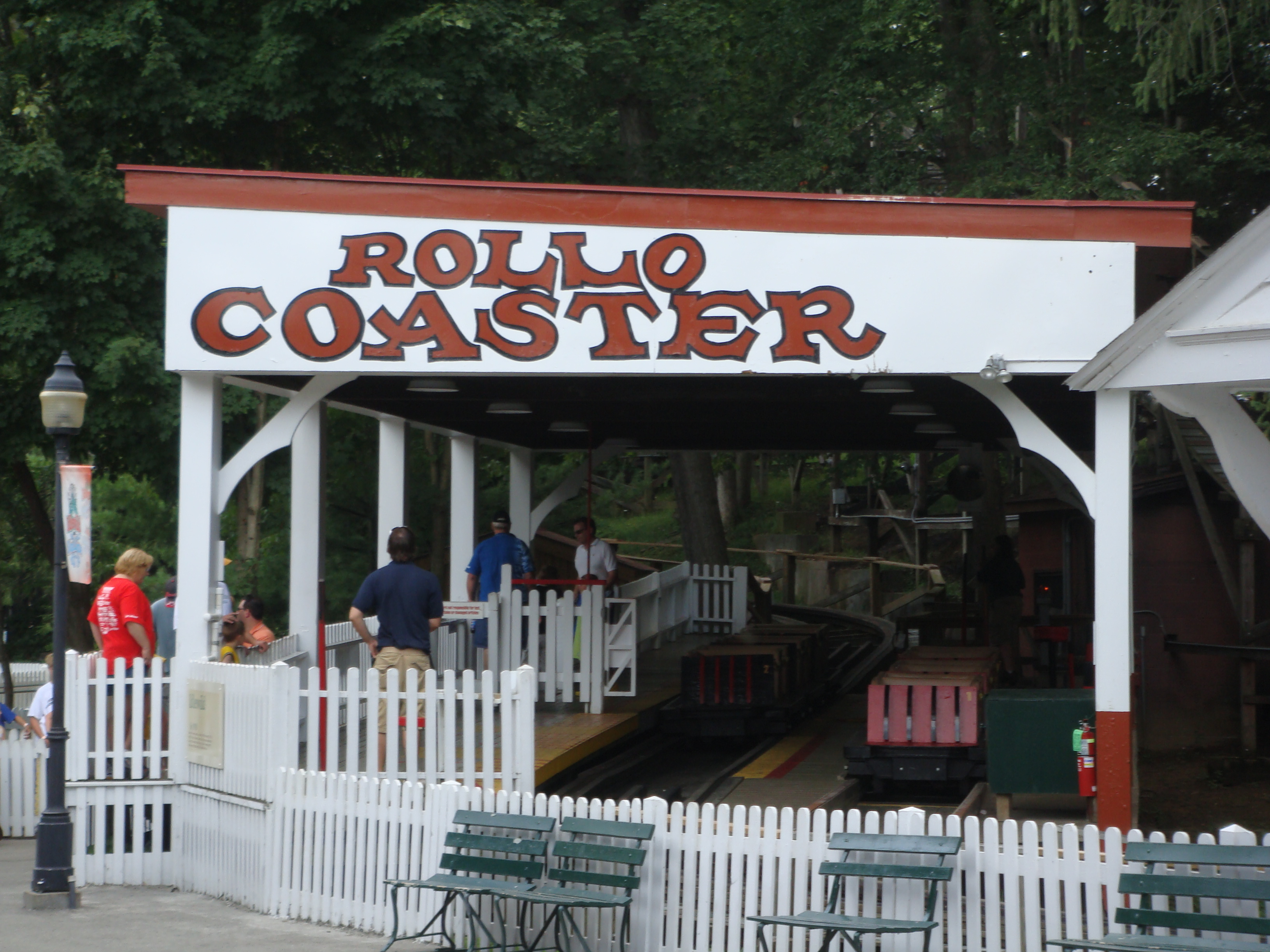
- Ride entrance in August 2008

Idlewild and Soak Zone
- Location: Idlewild and Soak Zone
- Coordinates: 40.2602°N 79.2814°W
- Status: Operating
- Opening date: 1938

General statistics
- Type: Wood
- Manufacturer: Philadelphia Toboggan Coasters
- Designer: Herbert Paul Schmeck
- Track layout: Terrain out-and-back
- Lift/launch system: Chain lift
- Height: 27 ft (8.2 m)
- Drop: 25 ft (7.6 m)
- Length: 900 ft (270 m)
- Speed: 25 mph (40 km/h)
- Duration: 1:15
- Restraint style: Lap bar with seat belt (since 2018)
- Height restriction: 42 in (107 cm)
- Trains: Single train with 4 cars; riders arranged 2 across in a single row with the exception of the first car which has 2 rows for a total of 10 riders per train.
- Rollo Coaster at RCDB

Rollo Coaster is a wooden roller coaster located at Idlewild and Soak Zone near Ligonier, Pennsylvania. It was built in 1938 by Philadelphia Toboggan Coasters (PTC). It was Idlewild's first and only roller coaster for decades, until the larger Wild Mouse coaster was erected in 1993. The coaster temporarily closed in 2016 following an incident, but reopened in 2018.

== History ==
Rollo Coaster opened in 1938. Its original train featured no restraints except for a grab bar. It was designated by American Coaster Enthusiasts (ACE) as an ACE Coaster Classic for the preservation of its historic standard of ride operations. This designation was rescinded upon the addition of its new trains, which utilize stricter restraints than the designation allows for.

=== 2016 incident and train redesign ===
On August 11, 2016, four riders boarded Rollo Coaster and the train was dispatched. The train traveled the course normally until the train reached the turnaround. As the train rolled through the turnaround, a three-year-old rider was ejected from the train, hitting a nearby fence. The train traversed the rest of the course without further issue. The ejected rider suffered head and chest injuries and was flown to the UPMC Children's Hospital of Pittsburgh.

The ride was closed pending an investigation and remained closed for the remainder of the 2016 season, as well as all of the 2017 season. In May 2017, the Division of Rides and Amusements of the Pennsylvania Department of Agriculture released its investigative report, detailing how the ride's restraints were not extensive enough to secure a rider as small as the three-year-old. In addition, the report noted several instances of excessive wear and movement of the train hitches and tracks, but it wasn't stated whether these factors caused or influenced the accident. The report listed several requirements for the ride to be reopened, including the addition of seat belts, a reevaluation of minimum rider height, and a ride evaluation by a professional engineer. Based on this report, the state also recommended amusement parks with similar roller coasters voluntarily take the same actions.

Idlewild announced they had purchased a new train for Rollo Coaster from PTC, which included seat belts and lap bars, and that they expected the ride to resume operation for the 2018 season, pending a state inspection. It reopened in 2018 and has operated since without further issue.

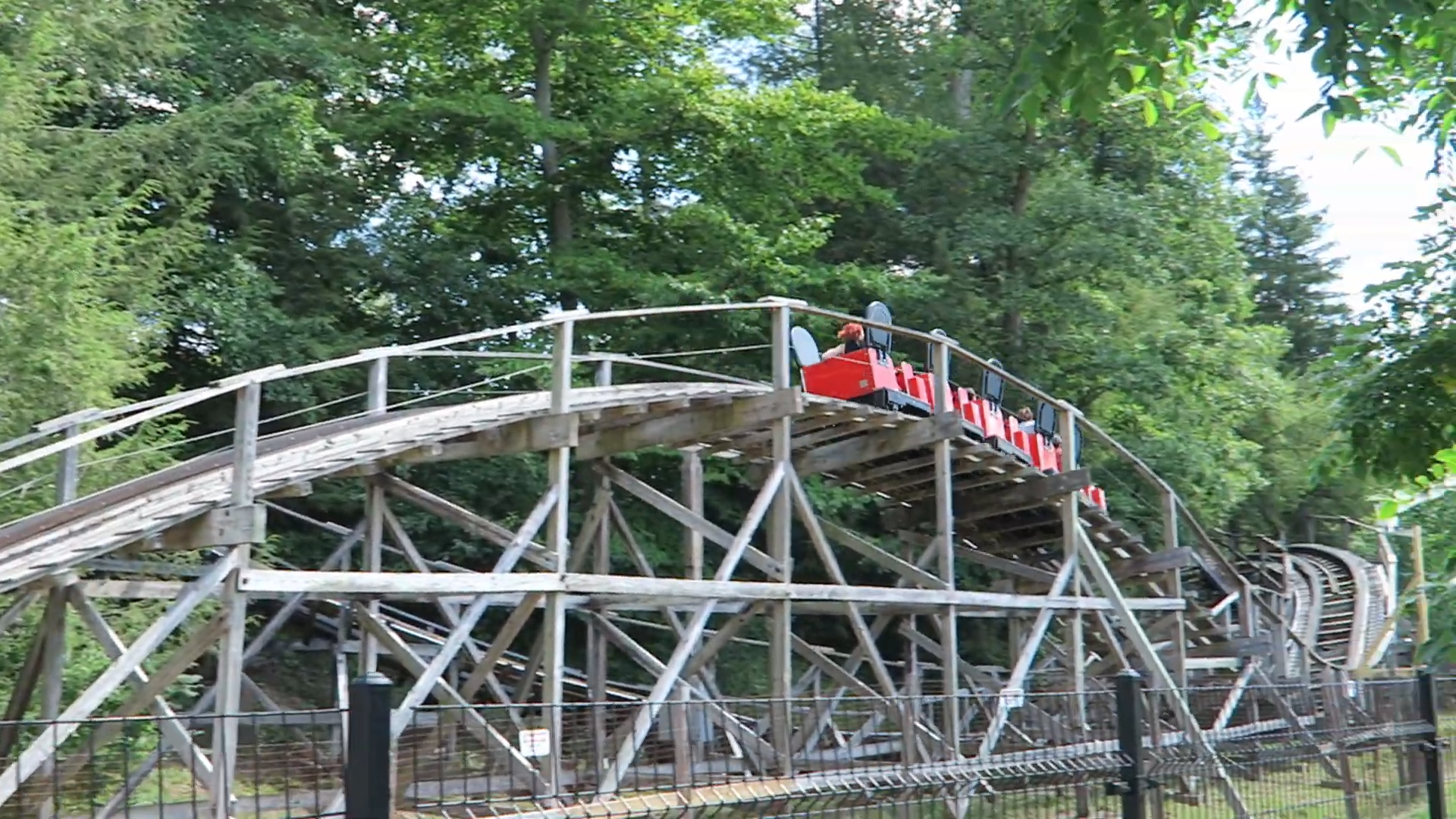
The train cresting a hill in 2022
