= Dennis C. Wolff =

American farmer, non-profit founder and public official

Denny Wolff
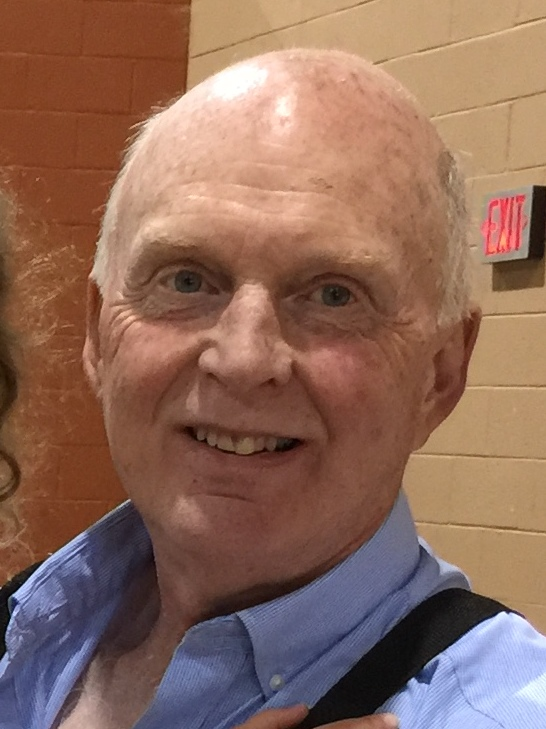

24th Secretary of Agriculture of Pennsylvania
- In office May 5, 2003 – December 16, 2009
- Governor: Ed Rendell
- Preceded by: Samuel Hayes
- Succeeded by: Russell Redding

Personal details
- Born: September 9, 1951 (age 74) Bloomsburg, Pennsylvania, U.S.
- Party: Democratic
- Spouse: Josey

Dennis C. "Denny" Wolff (born September 9, 1951) is an American farmer, non-profit founder, and former public official who was the 2018 Democratic nominee for U.S. Congress in Pennsylvania's (newly re-drawn) 9th Congressional District. Wolff is a former Secretary of the Pennsylvania Department of Agriculture, where he served in the cabinet of Governor Edward G. Rendell. Wolff is also the founder and president of The Nicholas Wolff Foundation, a non-profit which operates as Camp Victory, a summer camp for chronically ill children and their families.

== Dairy farmer ==
Wolff is the owner of Pen-Col Farms, based in Millville, Pennsylvania. He is a fifth-generation Pennsylvania dairy farmer and began his own farming operation in 1970. Wolff started in a rented farm with thirty-five Holstein cows and grew into an operation which spanned several farms and included over 500 Holsteins. From 1970 through the early 2000s, Pen-Col Farms operated a dairy store just outside of Millville. Pen-Col Farms began operating internationally in the 1980s.

== Camp Victory ==
Wolff is the president and chairman of the board of directors of Camp Victory, a 501(c)(3) non-profit organization. In 1984, Wolff's youngest son, Nicholas, was born with a rare liver disease, biliary atresia. Nicholas spent the first two years of his life in and out of hospitals until receiving a life-saving liver transplant in 1986 at the University of Minnesota. Wolff donated 35 acres of land to start a camp for chronically ill children. The camp hosted in first campers in 1994.

== Pennsylvania Secretary of Agriculture ==
Ed Rendell, the governor of Pennsylvania, appointed Wolff to be his Secretary of Agriculture, a cabinet-level appointment, in January 2003. He was confirmed by the Pennsylvania State Senate later that year. Wolff was involved in the annual Pennsylvania Farm Show, held at the Pennsylvania Farm Show Complex and Expo Center, the largest indoor agricultural exhibit in the United States.

During his time leading the Pennsylvania Department of Agriculture, Wolff implemented several programs intended to promote the agriculture industry. He set up the Center for Dairy Excellence, which "was created to develop and support programs for both the Center for Dairy Excellence and other Pennsylvania dairy organizations which educate, cultivate, and inspire a thriving and sustainable Pennsylvania dairy industry." Wolff implemented the "PA Preferred" program, a branding program to promote Pennsylvania agricultural products.

Wolff set up the "PA Grows" program, which helps agribusinesses in Pennsylvania obtain low-rate financing necessary to begin, continue or expand their operations.

Wolff resigned in 2009 and was succeeded by Russell Redding. After Wolff stepped down from his role as Secretary, Governor Tom Corbett signed state House Bill 1424 in 2011, making PA Preferred the permanent branding program of agricultural commodities produced in Pennsylvania.

== Congressional campaign ==
On October 12, 2017, Wolff announced his candidacy for the United States House of Representatives. He used the campaign slogan "Send a Farmer".

In his announcement, Wolff stated that "When I look at the United States Congress, I don’t see many people that have lived the same kind of life that I have, the same kind of life my neighbors have.” He ran as a moderate rural Democrat in a district drawn to favor a Republican. PoliticsPA in October 2017 added this race to their list of vulnerable districts in the 2018 election cycle, saying that "party officials are high on Dennis Wolff, a dairy farmer and former state secretary of agriculture." The Democratic Congressional Campaign Committee in November 2017 placed the district on their "battleground" lists for the 2018 election cycle. Wolff is a Blue Dog Democrat, a coalition of moderate and conservative Democrats, often from rural areas. Wolff was formally endorsed by the Blue Dogs on February 8, 2018. Wolff was only one of two Congressional candidates endorsed by the Blue Dogs in Pennsylvania during the 2018 election cycle, the other being Conor Lamb.

After the Pennsylvania Supreme Court struck down the 2011 congressional map on January 22, 2018, the Court put in place a redrawn "remedial" congressional map on February 19, 2018. Wolff indicated that regardless of other factors, he would run in whichever district his home in Columbia County was placed in. Columbia County was subsequently placed into the new 9th Congressional district, which included all of Carbon, Columbia, Montour, Schuylkill and Lebanon counties, as well as parts of Berks, Luzerne and Northumberland counties. The new 9th district was rated as having a Partisan Voting Index (PVI) of R+14, among the most conservative congressional districts in the country.

On May 15, 2018, Wolff won the Democratic primary for the 9th Congressional District, taking in 41% of the vote, compared to Gary Wegman's 31% and Laura Quick's 28%. Wolff won every county in the district except Wegman and Quick's home counties.

9th District Democratic primary results
Candidate	% of total votes	Votes
Denny Wolff	41%	11,020
Gary Wegman	31%	8,450
Laura Quick	28%	7,616

Wolff received several endorsements during his campaign, particularly from the agricultural and labor sectors. Wolff received the support of agricultural equipment manufacturer John Deere and the National Farmers Union. “It’s an exceptional thing for the [National Farmers Union] PAC to make a primary endorsement, but Denny Wolff is an exceptional candidate," said National Farmers Union President Roger Johnson. Wolff also received multiple blue-collar labor endorsements, including the SEIU PA State Council, PA AFL–CIO, International Association of Sheet Metal, Air, Rail and Transportation Workers (SMART), and the United Association of Plumbers and Pipefitters. In addition to his prior endorsement by the Blue Dogs, he was also endorsed by the Pennsylvania State Education Association, the largest group of educators in Pennsylvania.

The contest heated up in October, when Wolff claimed Meuser told him privately to "go to hell" at a debate in Berks County. Meuser's campaign denied the allegation, stating that Wolff's claim was "completely insane" and "completely made up," apparently unaware that video evidence of the interaction existed. Later, Meuser would concede and confess to making the comment.

The general election was held on November 6, 2018. Meuser defeated Wolff with 59.7% of the vote, compared to Wolff's 40.3%. Wolff outperformed the district's 2016 presidential election, roughly cutting in half President Trump's 2016 margin of victory.

Pennsylvania's 9th congressional district, 2018
Party	Candidate	Votes	%
Republican	Dan Meuser	148,723	59.75
Democratic	Denny Wolff	100,204	40.25
Total votes		248,927	100.0
Republican hold			

== Board Positions ==
Wolff has served on/as:

- The Agricultural Technical Committee of the World Trade Organization
- The Board of Directors at American Farmland Trust
- The Board of Trustees at Penn State University
- The Board of Overseers at the University of Pennsylvania
- The Board of Directors at Agway Insurance Company
- The Pennsylvania Gaming Control Board
- President of the Northeast Association of State Department of Agriculture
- President and Chairman of the Board of Camp Victory
- State Committee of the USDA's Farm Service Agency
