= Idlewild and Soak Zone =

Children's amusement park in Ligonier, Pennsylvania, US

- Previously known as Idlewild Park
- Interactive map of Idlewild and Soak Zone
- Location: Ligonier, Pennsylvania, United States
- Coordinates: 40°15′40″N 79°16′53″W
- Opened: 1878; 148 years ago
- Owner: Herschend
- Operating season: May–September (Soak Zone); May–October (Idlewild Park)

Attractions
- Total: 40
- Roller coasters: 2
- Water rides: 16
- Website: www.idlewild.com

Idlewild and Soak Zone, also known as Idlewild Park or simply Idlewild, is an amusement park in the Laurel Highlands near Ligonier, Pennsylvania, United States, about 50 miles (80 km) east of Pittsburgh. It has won several awards, including from industry publication Amusement Today, as the best children's park in the world.

Founded in 1878 as a campground along the Ligonier Valley Railroad by Thomas Mellon, Idlewild is the oldest amusement park in Pennsylvania and the third oldest operating amusement park in the United States behind Lake Compounce and Cedar Point.

The prominent Mellon family established the park in 1878, and it remained family-owned for over 100 years. It expanded greatly throughout the first half of the 20th century, adding several rides, including Rollo Coaster in 1938.

In 1983, the park was purchased by Kennywood Entertainment Company, which oversaw additional expansion, including an attraction designed and voiced by Fred Rogers based on his television show Mister Rogers' Neighborhood. In early 2025, the park was sold to Herschend.

== History ==
=== Ligonier Valley Railroad and Mellon family: 1878–1952 ===
The park is situated alongside U.S. Route 30, also historically known in Pennsylvania as the Lincoln Highway, the first U.S. transcontinental highway. The region surrounding the park is the Laurel Highlands, and the park sits in the foothills of the Laurel Ridge.

The region was prominent in the French and Indian War, with Fort Ligonier located just 2 miles (3.2 km) away. On November 12, 1758, volunteers led by George Washington marched from Ligonier to aid George Mercer and his troops. At night in heavy fog, the two units mistook one another for the enemy and exchanged fire. Thirteen soldiers and one lieutenant were killed. Realizing the mistake, Washington ran amongst both groups, shouting and raising the men's rifles. Washington later wrote of the incident that he had never felt in more danger in his life. Though the location had never been entirely verified, in Images of America: Idlewild, author Jeffrey S. Croushore acknowledges the opinion that the event took place in a section of Idlewild that was previously a wooded area known as the Woodlands.

On April 15, 1853, the Commonwealth of Pennsylvania granted a charter for a railroad to haul coal and timber between the towns of Ligonier and Latrobe. Latrobe and Ligonier Rail Road Company performed no work on the railroad for nearly twenty years, and renewed their charter in 1866 and 1869. Following an additional renewal in 1871, the company changed its name to the Ligonier Valley Railroad and acquired a 10.3 miles (16.6 km) stretch of land. Land grading and bridge construction for the narrow gauge line was mostly completed by 1873.

In 1875, the partially constructed railway was sold at a sheriff's sale after the Latrobe terminus of the Pennsylvania Railroad declined to assume financial responsibility. Thomas Mellon, a retired Court of Common Pleas judge from Allegheny County, purchased the Ligonier Valley Railroad at auction. Mellon had previously founded the T. Mellon & Sons' Bank, and was invested in many railroad ventures. To attract new passengers, Mellon implemented recreational grounds along the route.

On May 1, 1878, William Darlington, landowner and namesake of the nearby village of Darlington, responded to Mellon's request to use his land:

Dear Sir:

In compliance with your request, I will and do hereby agree to grant to the Ligonier Valley Rail Road Company the right and privilege to occupy for picnic purposes or pleasure grounds that portion of land in Ligonier Township, Westmoreland County as follows – the strip or piece of ground lying between the railway and the creek and extending from the old cornfield to Byards run – also two or three acres on the opposite side of the creek adjoining near the same. Without compensation in the shape of rent for three years from the first of April 1878, provided no timber or other trees are to be cut or injured – the underbrush you may clear out if you wish to do so.

Yours respectfully,

Wm. M. Darlington

The first structure, built that year, was a train depot measuring 10 feet (3.0 m) by 25 feet (7.6 m). The depot was the smallest full-service station in the United States. Initial land development included campsites, an artificial lake for fishing and boating, picnic tables, and a large hall. The railroad provided easy access to the site, attracting visitors from 50 miles (80 km) away, notably from Pittsburgh and its surrounding areas, for a getaway in the country. The Ligonier Echo noted that on July 4, 1890, the trains to the park were so crowded that the "tops of the coaches were covered with boys."

While the initial lease with Darlington confined the park between the railroad and the north bank of the Loyalhanna Creek, permission was later granted to construct a bridge across the river, allowing expansion to the south in the mid-1880s. Three lakes—Woodland, St. Clair, and Bouquet—were dug between 1880 and 1896. In 1896, the park added a T.M. Harton Company steam carousel in the park's center. By the end of the 19th century, attractions at the park included a bicycle track around Lake Bouquet, a hiking trail on Lake Boquet's island, fishing in Loyalhanna Creek, rowboating, and many walks and gardens. The park also featured dining halls, auditoriums, pavilions, a boathouse, an amphitheater, a bandstand, and athletic facilities.

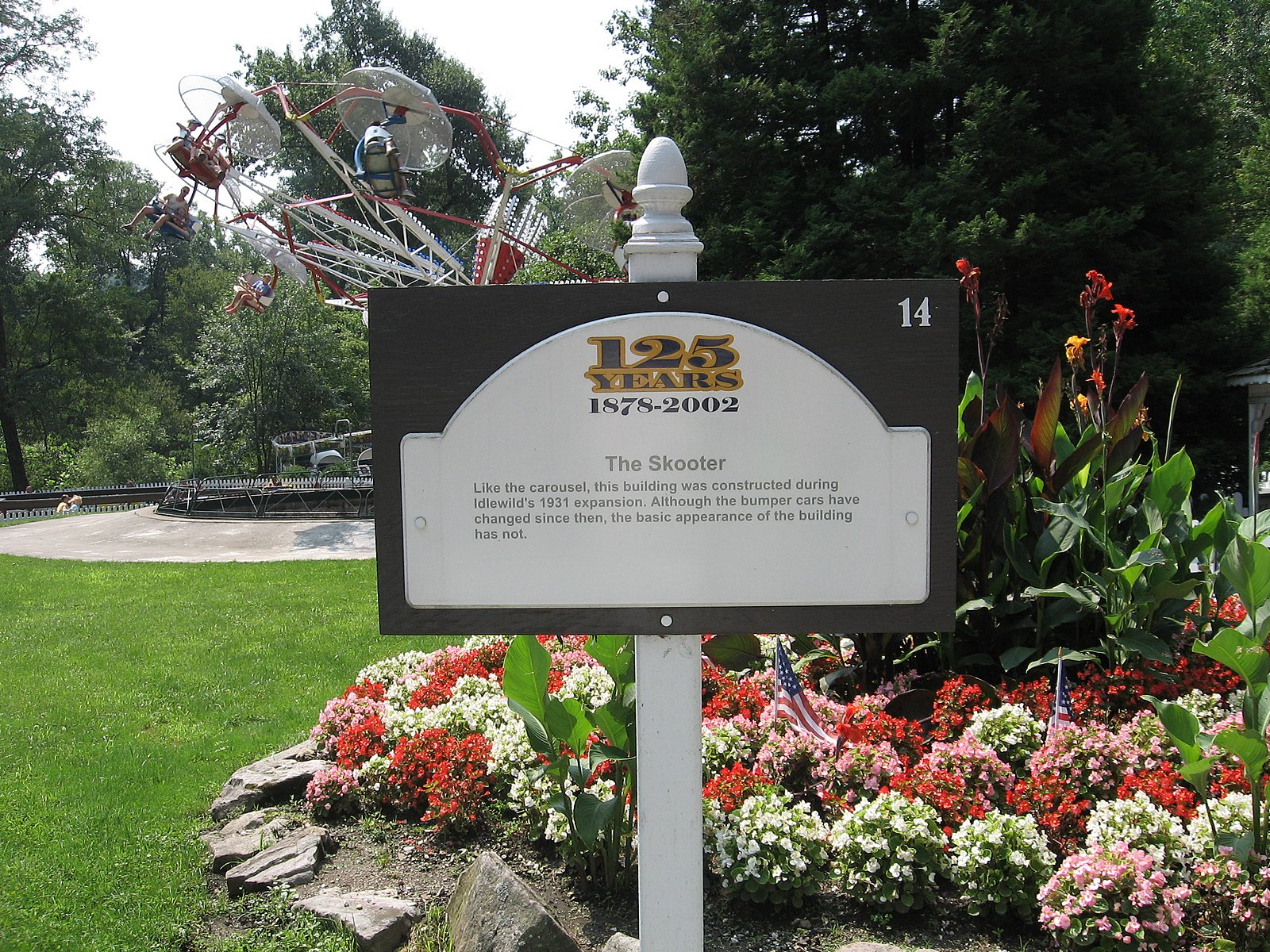
A sign acknowledging Skooters' 1931 construction. Several signs similar to this can be found all over the park, put up for the park's 125th anniversary in 2002.

In 1931, Mellon's son Richard B. Mellon, alongside C. C. Macdonald, acquired the park under a partnership known as the Idlewild Management Company. The first season under the financial support of Mellon and the management of Macdonald and his family brought electricity to the park, allowing for later operating hours and electric-powered rides, including a three-row Philadelphia Toboggan Company carousel. The park also debuted a caged group of black bears that year. Located near the bears was a cage of monkeys, who notably escaped their enclosure in 1932. Park management offered a reward of $3 each ($71 each in 2025) for the return of the seven monkeys, believing that they had been purposefully set loose. R. Z. Macdonald later said that his father, C. C., was always amused with and pleased by the escape's publicity.

In 1913, the Lincoln Highway was established as the first cross-country autoroute, and it passed directly by Idlewild on what is now U.S. Route 30. As automobile traffic to the park increased, several parking lots and a Gulf Oil gas station were added to the park in the 1930s.

The Macdonalds sought to maintain the park's natural beauty, planting 10,000 shrubs in their first year of ownership, and thousands of trees throughout the 1930s. During this time, the park added a circle swing, a Whip, a miniature railroad, and a roller coaster called Rollo Coaster. World War II and the subsequent wartime rationing forced the park to close temporarily in 1943. Upon reopening in 1946, the park added a Caterpillar and a small showboat that sailed in Lake Bouquet.

=== Macdonald family: 1952–1983 ===
The Macdonald family obtained complete ownership of the park in 1951. After leaving Idlewild, the Mellon family also abandoned the Ligonier Valley Railroad, which had been in decline following the closure of several area coal mines and decreasing passenger traffic. The railroad ceased operations entirely in 1952.

Under the Macdonalds, the park continued to expand. Kiddieland was constructed between 1954 and 1956, and featured many small rides intended for young children. Some of the rides included miniature boats, a Ferris wheel, a doodlebug, and pony rides.

Clinton "Jack" Macdonald became president of the park in 1957. In 1959, Macdonald and Lewis Davidson, a bagpipe director at the Carnegie Institute of Technology, started the Ligonier Highland Games, a Scottish highland games event held at the park. The games, held annually in early September after the park had closed for the summer, became one of the country's largest and most highly regarded Scottish athletic and cultural competitions. Macdonald said of the games, "We're not interested in becoming one of the biggest games. We just want to be one of the nicest." While initially attracting crowds of around 1,200, the festival now records average attendances near 10,000. During the same year he assumed control of the park, Macdonald was appointed the first commissioner of the Scottish Clan Donald for Pennsylvania.

The park sustained heavy damage when the remnants of Hurricane Agnes dropped 14 inches (360 mm) of rain on the area in 24 hours in June of 1972. Lake St. Clair and Lake Bouquet merged in the resulting flood, causing significant damage to the boathouse. The flood lifted and twisted the park's Loyalhanna Limited Railroad, which required extensive repairs.

In 1976, Historic Village was built to celebrate the US bicentennial. It was heavily inspired by 19th century Western towns.

=== Kennywood Entertainment Company era: 1983–2007 ===
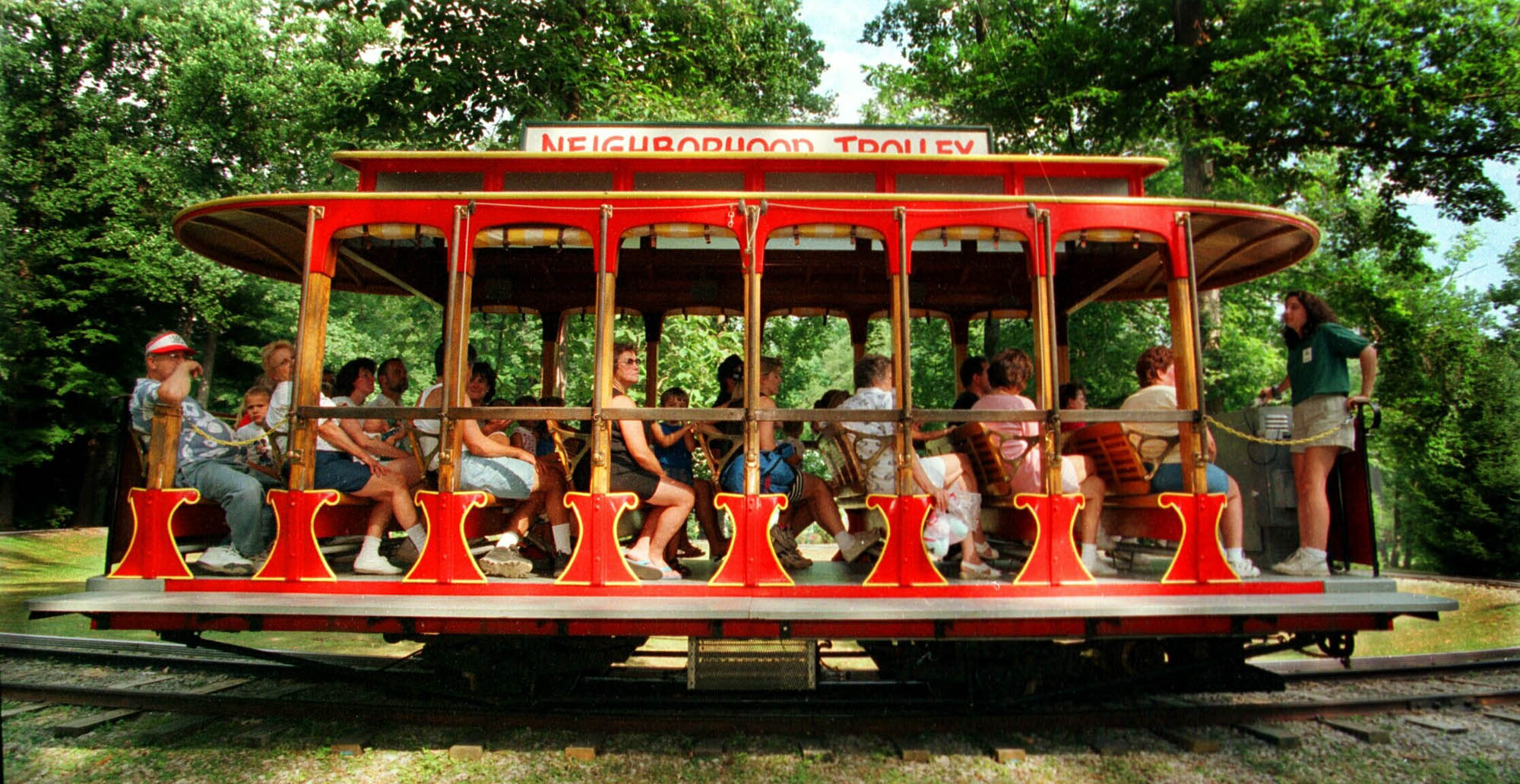
The replica trolley car that operated at Mister Rogers' Neighborhood of Make Believe attraction from 1989 to 2013

On January 27, 1983, Kennywood Entertainment Company of West Mifflin, Pennsylvania, bought the park from the Macdonald family for a reported price of $1.8 million. Both Kennywood and Idlewild were initially founded by the Mellon family. During the first winter in which the park was owned by Kennywood Entertainment Company, several changes occurred. Jumpin' Jungle, a children's play area, was added. Story Book Forest, which operated as a separate attraction, was merged with the rest of the park. Historic Village was relocated and renamed.

As the popularity of the park's pool increased, a designated water park called H20hhh Zone was established in 1985 with the addition of several water slides. In 1989, the park expanded across the Loyalhanna Creek by adding a trolley ride themed to Mister Rogers' Neighborhood, a popular children's television show. The ride was designed and voiced by children's entertainer Fred Rogers, a native of nearby Latrobe, and was called Mister Rogers' Neighborhood of Make-Believe. The area was expanded the following year to include Raccoon Lagoon, an area for children. A Ferris wheel, Tilt-A-Whirl, and water raft were added throughout the 1980s, along with games, food stands, and restaurants.

The 1990s saw the addition of Wild Mouse, the only wild mouse roller coaster designed by Vekoma. The roller coaster was initially built in 1985 and had previously operated at Prater in Austria and Alton Towers in England, before being relocated to Idlewild in 1993. Kennywood continued the Macdonald tradition of offering large-scale entertainment, presenting circuses, lumberjack and acrobatics shows, and stage performances at the new Hillside Theater. A large picnic area with several log pavilions and game fields was added in 1999. In the early 2000s, new additions to the waterpark doubled its previous size, and inspired a name change for the park: Idlewild and Soak Zone.

=== Palace Entertainment: 2007–2025 ===
Kennywood Entertainment Company had acquired several other previously family-owned and operated parks after it purchased Idlewild in 1983, becoming an amusement park chain. On December 11, 2007, Kennywood Entertainment announced that it would sell its parks to the Madrid-based amusement company, Parques Reunidos. The ownership of Kennywood ensured that despite the transaction all of the company's parks, the parks would experience few changes, and day-to-day park operations would remain local.

In December 2009, Idlewild announced that the Royal Hanneford Circus would perform at the park during the 2010 season, for the first time since 1997. For the 2011 season, the park added a $2 million, 280,600 gallon wave pool, replacing their swimming pool that had been in operation since 1931. The project was the largest capital improvement undertaken by the park. Before the 2013 season, Idlewild removed its 1947 Caterpillar ride and the Dizzy Lizzy's Saloon Haunted Swing attraction.

During the interim time between the 2013 and 2014 seasons, it was announced that the park had permanently closed Mister Rogers' Neighborhood of Make-Believe. The attraction was re-themed, in coordination with Fred Rogers Productions, to Daniel Tiger's Neighborhood, the modern spin-off of Mister Rogers' Neighborhood. The re-themed attraction reopened in the 2015 season.

On August 11, 2016, a three-year-old boy was thrown from Rollo Coaster and suffered serious injuries. The ride was closed pending an investigation for the remainder of the season, and remained closed for the 2017 season. A subsequent report from the Division of Rides and Amusements of the Pennsylvania Department of Agriculture listed several requirements for the ride to be reopened. To follow these requirements, Idlewild purchased a new train for the coaster in 2018, featuring seat belts and ratcheting lap bars.

Following the 2017 season, Idlewild removed its 1938 Whip attraction, which had been closed for the 2017 season due to flood damage. On November 3, 2020, Idlewild announced that it would be removing the Ferris wheel in Olde Idlewild, the Rainbow Wheel kiddie Ferris wheel in Raccoon Lagoon, and the Bubbling Springs ball pit in Jumpin' Jungle for the 2021 season.

=== Herschend: 2025–present ===
On March 18, 2025, it was announced that the park, alongside several other American Parques Reunidos parks, had been purchased by Herschend.

== Areas ==
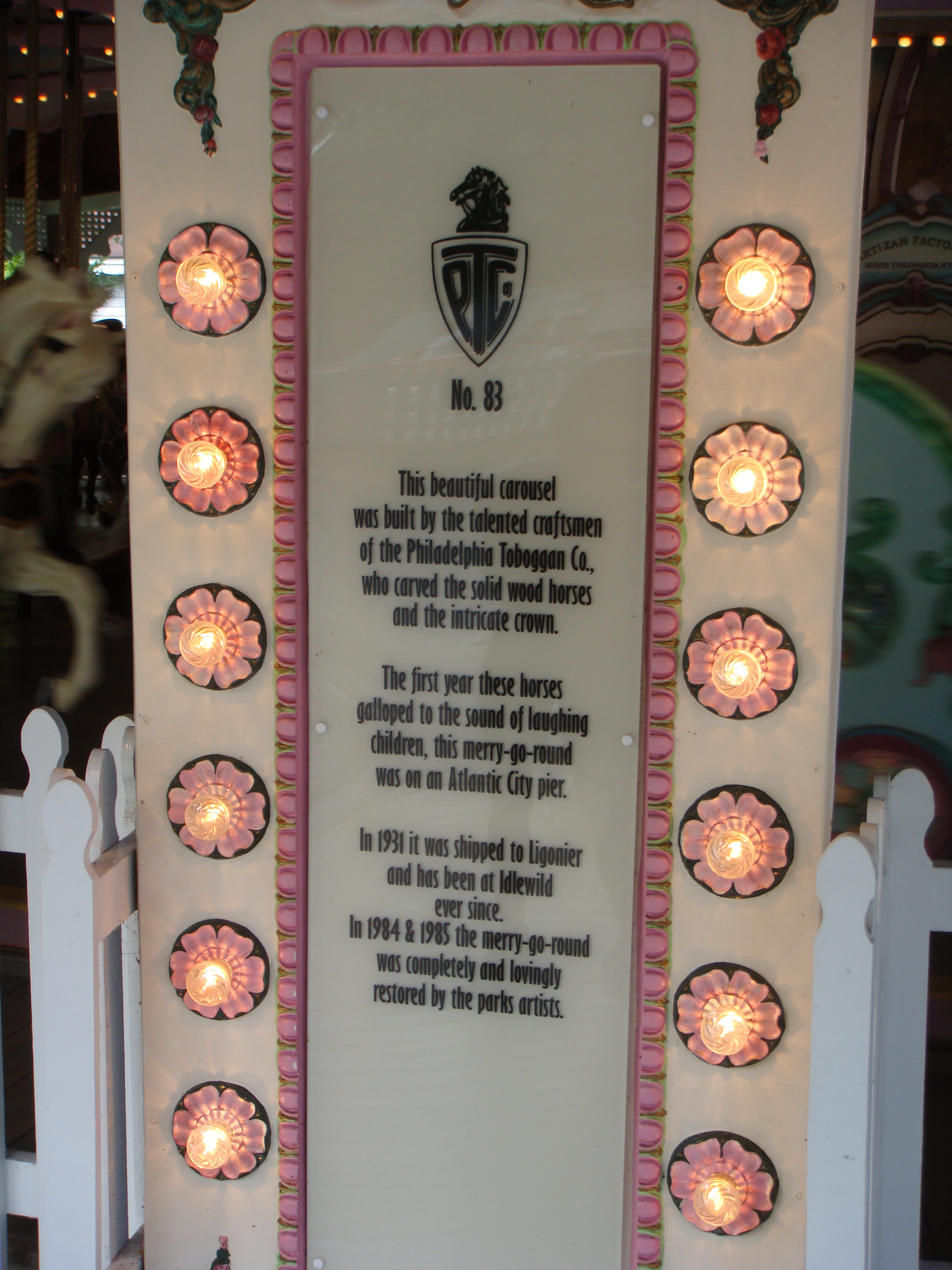
A sign at the carousel, identifying it as Philadelphia Toboggan Company Carousel No. 83

=== Olde Idlewild ===
Olde Idlewild's centerpiece is the park's Philadelphia Toboggan Company Carousel (PTC #83), built in 1930 and brought to Idlewild in 1931. The carousel's music is provided by two band organs: an Artizan Style D (fitted with a Wurlitzer #125 roll frame), and a Wurlitzer Caliola. Olde Idlewild contains many of the park's traditional rides. On the parking lot side of the carousel is the wooden coaster Rollo Coaster, built by Philadelphia Toboggan Company in 1938 with lumber from the park, using a sawmill built nearby specifically for the project. The American Coaster Enthusiasts named the Rollo Coaster an ACE Coaster Classic, though this designation was rescinded in 2018 after the installation of the ride's new trains. Sitting in the trees adjacent to the Loyalhanna Creek is Wild Mouse, added in 1993. Scrambler, Flying Aces, and Tilt-A-Whirl are also located near the carousel.

Another group of rides in Olde Idlewild is located around the park's Skooters, added in 1931. Also near Skooters are Balloon Race, Paratrooper, and Spider. Below Paratrooper is Super Round Up.

Olde Idlewild contained a Caterpillar ride until 2013. Built in 1947, Idlewild's model was one of three similar rides still in operation in North America, one of two featuring a working canopy that covers the riders, and the only one that still utilized an undercarriage fan. The park announced that the ride was removed to be refurbished and would return in the future. However, as of 2025, there has been no further word from the park regarding the Caterpillar.

=== Hootin' Holler ===
In 1976, Historic Village was built to commemorate the US bicentennial. Modeled after a typical 19th century Western town, the area included a general store, blacksmith and wood shops, sheriff's office, and jail, newspaper office, saloon and restaurant.

In 1984, Historic Village was relocated from near the park gates to the center of the park, and renamed Hootin' Holler. The area's main attraction is Confusion Hill, a themed walkthrough tour with optical illusions. The park's 2 ft (610 mm) narrow gauge Loyalhanna Limited Railroad attraction crosses the Loyalhanna Creek to Raccoon Lagoon and back. The area also includes Howler, a spinning ride modeled like a tornado, and Paul Bunyan's Loggin' Toboggan, a log flume ride.

=== Soak Zone ===
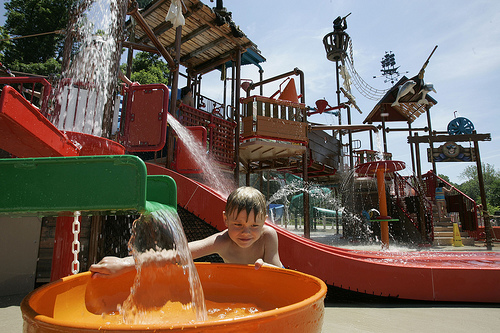
Captain Kidd's play area

The location of Soak Zone was originally an island known as Flower Island. In 1931, a swimming pool and bathhouse were constructed on the island. In 1985, waterslides were added and the area became known as H20hhh Zone, and later as Dr. Hydro's Soak Zone. A raft ride called Rafter's Run was added in 1986. Little Squirts, a kiddie area, was added in 1992. In 2000, part of the lake was filled in and several new attractions were added, including a new slide complex and a tipping bucket. Captain Kidd's Adventure Galley, a water playground, would be added in 2006. The swimming pool was replaced by a heated wave pool in 2011. For the 2013 season, the park added a lazy river and an expanded beach area. The speed slides, which were original 1985 additions, would be removed in 2008, and Rafter's Run was removed prior to the 2019 season after standing out of operation the previous season.

=== Jumpin' Jungle ===
Added in 1983, Jumpin' Jungle is an interactive play area for children. The area includes attractions such as slides, climbing nets, and a suspension bridge. A slide called Bigfoot's Mudslide was added to the area in 2008, taking its name from Westmoreland County's reputation for the most sightings in Pennsylvania of Bigfoot. Several features have been removed or changed over the years, including Bigfoot's Mudslide, which was removed following the 2023 season.

=== Raccoon Lagoon ===
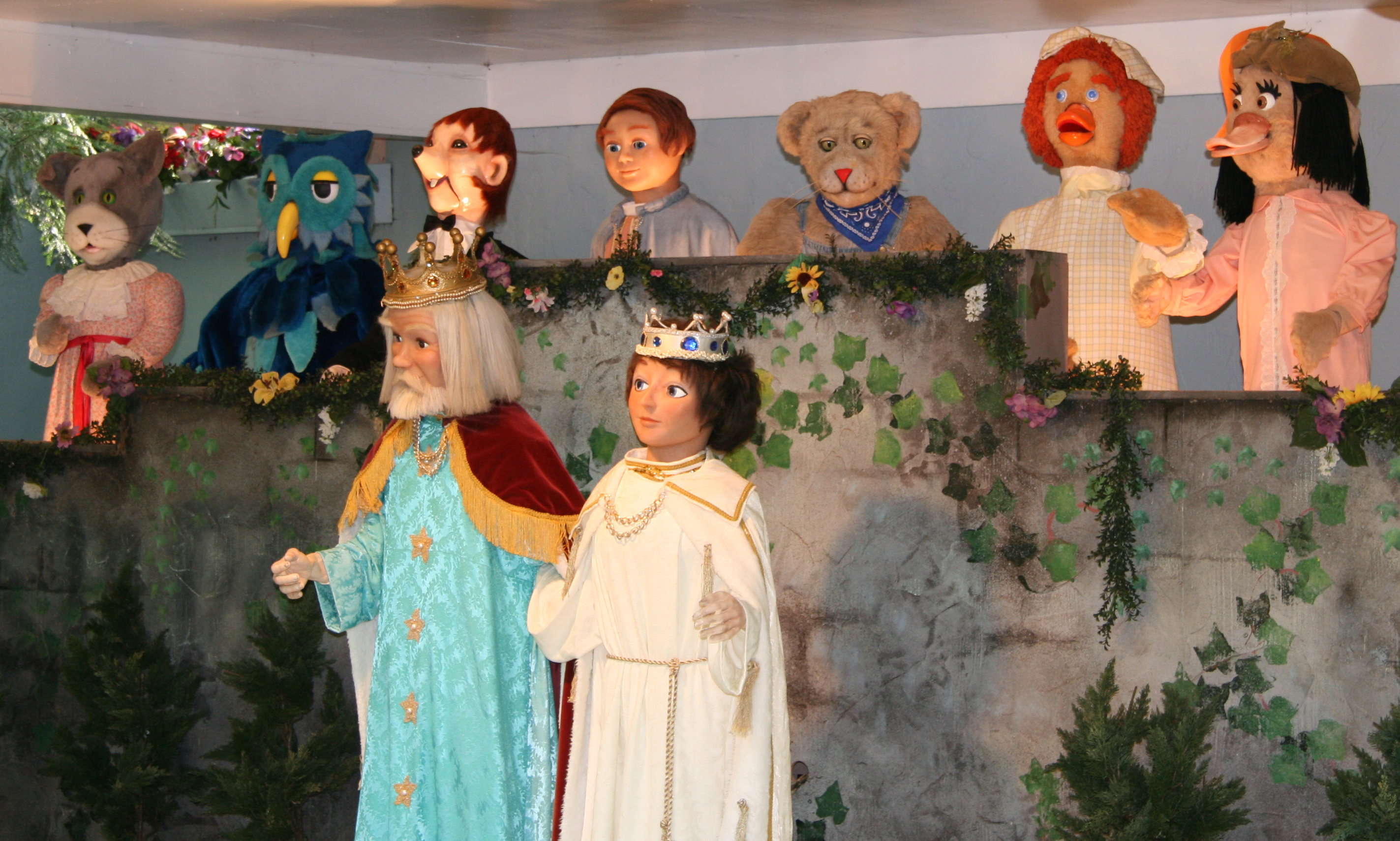
Animatronic characters from the former Mr. Rogers' Neighborhood of Make-Believe attraction

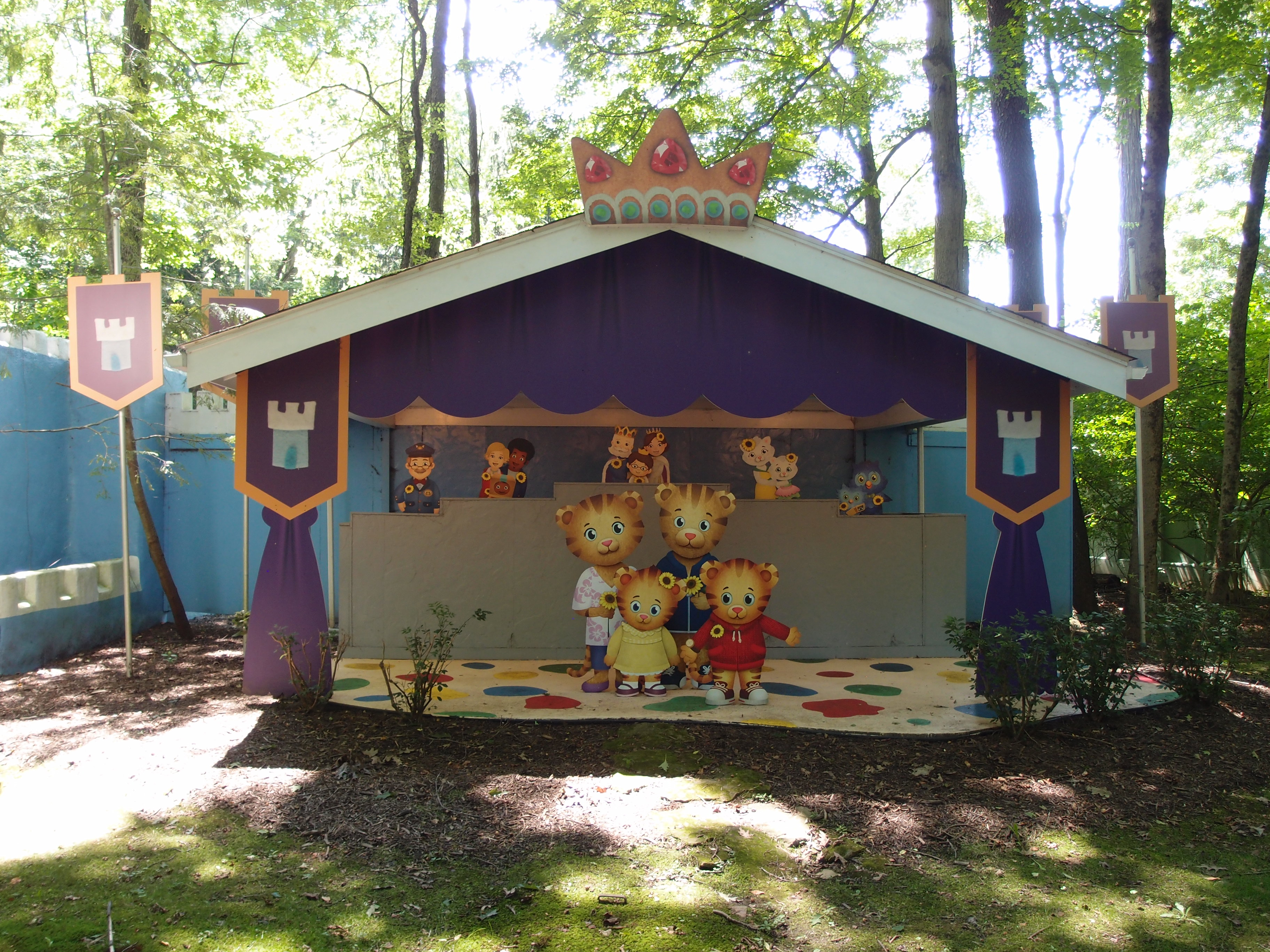
Daniel Tiger's Neighborhood

Raccoon Lagoon was added in 1990 after originally opening in a different location in 1954. The 9-acre (3.6 ha) area devoted to children-oriented rides is one of the largest in the United States. Raccoon Lagoon was originally home to the Mister Rogers' Neighborhood of Make-Believe attraction. Built in 1989, the 3 ft (914 mm) narrow gauge trolley ride was designed specifically for Idlewild by Fred Rogers, and was based on his popular children's television show. Before the 2014 season, it was announced that the ride would be re-themed in coordination with Fred Rogers Productions to their more recent children's show, Daniel Tiger's Neighborhood. The redone attraction, now called Daniel Tiger's Neighborhood Trolley Ride, reopened in 2015.

=== Story Book Forest ===
Arthur Jennings, who portrayed the clown character "Happy Dayze" in the park during the 1950s and an accomplished engineer, approached park management about creating Story Book Forest, a themed area based on "emotion rather than motion". Jennings did much of the work himself, including life-sized models of fairy tales. The park, originally separate from Idlewild, opened in 1956. Story Book Forest featured several attractions, including a pirate ship, a castle, and many live storybook characters. It was merged with the rest of the park in 1983. It celebrated its 50th anniversary in 2006.

== Rides and attractions ==
=== Roller coasters ===
Coaster	Park area	Picture	Opened	Manufacturer	Model	Notes
Rollo Coaster	Olde Idlewild		1938	Philadelphia Toboggan Coasters	Wooden roller coaster	Opened in 1938 with lumber sourced directly from the park, using a sawmill built nearby specifically for the project. In 2016, an incident occurred in which a young child was thrown from the ride and suffered severe injuries. The ride stood out of operation until 2018, when it received a new and more restrictive train from Philadelphia Toboggan Coasters.
Wild Mouse	Olde Idlewild		1993	Vekoma	Steel wild mouse roller coaster	The only wild mouse roller coaster built by Vekoma. Previously operated at Prater in Austria and Alton Towers in England.

=== Family rides ===
Rides	Park area	Opened	Manufacturer	Model	Notes
Balloon Race	Olde Idlewild	1995	Zamperla	Balloon Race	Previously operated at Kennywood in Pennsylvania from 1990 to 1994
Flying Aces	Olde Idlewild	2007	Premier Rides	Flying Scooters	
Howler	Hootin' Holler'	2004	Wisdom Rides	Tornado	
Paul Bunyan's Loggin' Toboggan	Hootin' Holler'	2005	Arrow Dynamics	Log flume	Originally operated at Old Indiana Fun Park in Indiana from 1988 to 1996 as Waterfull Flume
Loyalhanna Limited Railroad	Olde Idlewild	1965	Chance Rides	Train ride	Originally operated with a Crown Metal steam locomotive. Replaced with two C. P. Huntington trains in the 1990s.
Merry Go Round	Olde Idlewild	1931	Philadelphia Toboggan Coasters	Carousel	While the carousel has two band organs, they are rarely used, instead opting to use a recording of a band organ
Paratrooper	Olde Idlewild	1964	Frank Hrubetz & Company	Paratrooper	
Round Up	Olde Idlewild	1986	Frank Hrubetz & Company	Super Round Up	Previously operated at Kennywood
Scrambler	Olde Idlewild	1977	Eli Bridge Company	Scrambler	
Skooter	Olde Idlewild	1931	Reverchon Industries	Bumper cars	The building which holds the ride was built in 1931, and initially housed bumper cars from Lusse Brothers. At some point, they were replaced with more modern bumper cars.
Spider	Olde Idlewild	1982	Eyerly Aircraft Company	Spider	
Tilt-N-Twister	Hootin' Holler'	1993	Sellner Manufacturing	Tilt-A-Whirl	The current Tilt-A-Whirl was manufactured in 1993. It is the third to have operated at the park, with the first dating back to 1954. Ride was renamed in a relocation to the Hootin' Holler area in 2026.

=== Kiddie rides ===
Rides	Park area	Opened	Manufacturer	Model	Notes
Dino Soars	Raccoon Lagoon	2003	Zamperla	Miniature spinning ride	
Doodlebug	Raccoon Lagoon	1950s	San Antonio Roller Works	Trolley ride	
Little Rascals	Raccoon Lagoon	1954	Hampton Amusement Company	Miniature handcars	
Raccoon Racers	Raccoon Lagoon	1970	San Antonio Roller Works	Honda Cycle	
Red Baron	Raccoon Lagoon	1947	Allan Herschell Company	Plane ride	Converted helicopter ride
Ricky's Racers	Raccoon Lagoon	1998	Arrow Development	Arrowflite Junior	Relocated from Old Indiana Fun Park. Originally operated at Euclid Beach Park in Ohio.
Tea Party	Raccoon Lagoon	2008	Zamperla	Tea cups	Relocated from Geauga Lake in Ohio
Scampers	Raccoon Lagoon	1947	Allan Herschell Company	Car ride	
Turtles	Raccoon Lagoon	1952	R.E. Chambers Company	Miniature Tumble Bug	

=== Former rides & attractions ===
Rides	Park area	Year opened	Year closed	Manufacturer	Model	Notes
Adult Handcars	Raccoon Lagoon	Unknown	2023	In-house	Handcars	Currently in storage
Caterpillar	Olde Idlewild	1947	2012	Allan Herschell Company	Caterpillar	Currently in storage. The last Caterpillar to feature both a fan and cover.
Cattail Derby	Raccoon Lagoon	1960s	2023	Lusse Brothers	Miniature bumper cars	
Dizzy Lizzy's Saloon	Hootin' Holler	1999	2012	In-house	Haunted swing	Currently standing but not operating
Ferris Wheel	Olde Idlewild	1984	2019	Eli Bridge Company	Aristocrat series Ferris wheel	Relocated to The Terrortorium Haunted House & Amusements. Previously operated at Kennywood.
Flivver	Raccoon Lagoon	Unknown	data-sort-value="" style="background: var(--background-color-interactive, #ececec); color: var(--color-base, inherit); vertical-align: middle; text-align: center; " class="table-na" | Unknown	Model-T cars	Currently in storage	
Pollywog Regatta	Raccoon Lagoon	1949	data-sort-value="" style="background: var(--background-color-interactive, #ececec); color: var(--color-base, inherit); vertical-align: middle; text-align: center; " class="table-na" | Unknown	Boat ride		
Rainbow Wheel	Raccoon Lagoon	1952	2020	W. F. Mangels	Kiddie ferris wheel	Currently in storage
Rumpus	Olde Idlewild	1936	1947	Pretzel Amusement Ride Company	Dark ride	Burned in 1947
Trinado	Olde Idlewild	1998	2006	HUSS Park Attractions	Tri-Star	Previously operated at Kennywood and Lagoon in Utah. Relocated to Parque Diversiones in Costa Rica.
Whip	Olde Idlewild	1939	2017	W. F. Mangels	12-car The Whip	Currently in storage

== Recognition ==
Idlewild and Soak Zone is the oldest operating amusement park in Pennsylvania, the third oldest in the United States, and the twelfth oldest in the world. The park has been recognized by trade magazine Amusement Today with a Golden Ticket Award for Best Children's Park every year from 2010 to 2018. The park previously received Golden Ticket Awards for the fifth-best children's area in 2006 and 2007, and for the second-best children's park from 2004 to 2009. The National Amusement Park Historical Association recognized Idlewild as the best park for families in 2010, 2011, and 2012, having previously named it the fourth-best park in 2005, second in 2006, fourth in 2007 and 2008, and third in 2009. The park was also once named "America's Most Beautiful Theme Park".

== Incidents ==
- On August 12, 2016, a 3-year-old boy was injured when he was ejected from the Rollo Coaster train. He was airlifted to Children's Hospital in Pittsburgh. The ride remained closed for two years before reopening again to the public in 2018 with new trains and improved safety features.

== Works cited ==
- Croushore, Jeffrey S. (2004). Images of America: Idlewild. Arcadia Publishing. ISBN 0-7385-3564-8.
- Futrell, Jim (2002). "Idlewild and Soak Zone". Amusement Parks of Pennsylvania. Stackpole Books. pp. 51–63. ISBN 0-8117-2671-1.
- Sopko, Jennifer (2018). Idlewild: History and Memories of Pennsylvania's Oldest Amusement Park. History Press. ISBN 978-1-4671-1954-2.
