= Kent Shelhamer =

American politician (1924–2024)

Kent D. Shelhamer

Pennsylvania Secretary of Agriculture
- In office 1977–1979
- Governor: Milton Shapp
- Preceded by: Raymond J. Kerstetter
- Succeeded by: Penrose Hallowell

Member of the Pennsylvania House of Representatives from the 109th district
- In office 1969–1976
- Preceded by: District created
- Succeeded by: Ted Stuban

Member of the Pennsylvania House of Representatives from the Columbia County district
- In office 1965–1968

Personal details
- Born: November 30, 1924 Orangeville, Pennsylvania, U.S.
- Died: May 31, 2024 (aged 99) Danville, Pennsylvania, U.S.
- Party: Democratic

Kent D. Shelhamer (November 30, 1924 – May 31, 2024) was an American politician who was a Democratic member of the Pennsylvania House of Representatives and Pennsylvania Secretary of Agriculture. He died on May 31, 2024, at the age of 99.
