= Pennsylvania House of Representatives, District 109 =

American legislative district

Pennsylvania's 109th State House of Representatives district
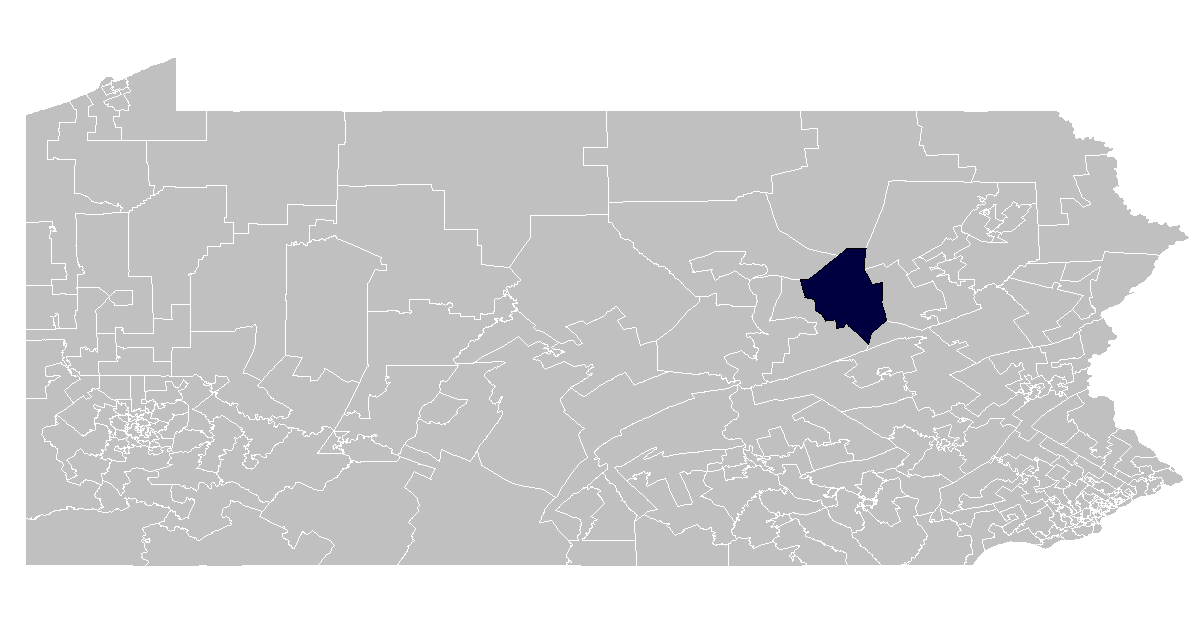
Representative
Robert Leadbeter; R–Catawissa

The 109th Pennsylvania House of Representatives District encompasses all of Columbia County.

== Representatives ==
Representative	Party	Years	District home	Note
Before 1969, seats were apportioned by county.
Kent D. Shelhamer	Democrat	1969 – 1976		
Ted Stuban	Democrat	1977 – 1993	Berwick	Retired 1992
John R. Gordner	Democrat	1993 – 2001	Berwick	Switched party in 2001
John R. Gordner	Republican	2001 – 2003	Berwick	Elected to the Pennsylvania State Senate
David R. Millard	Republican	2004 – 2023	Berwick	Elected January 27, 2004 to fill vacancy
Robert Leadbeter	Republican	2023 – present	Berwick	Incumbent
