= Robert Leadbeter =

American politician

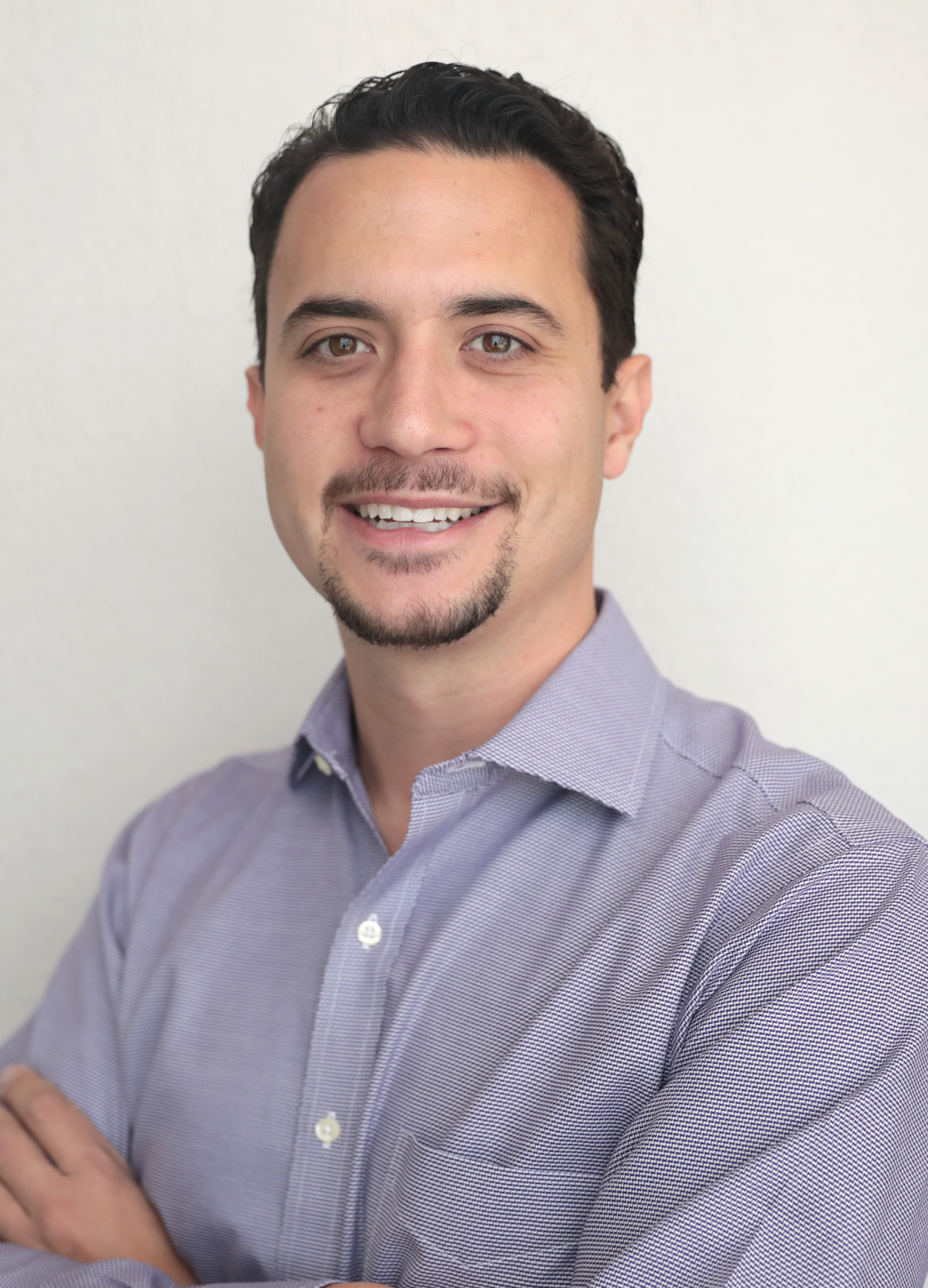

Member of the Pennsylvania House of Representatives from the 109th district
- Incumbent
- Assumed office December 1, 2022
- Preceded by: David R. Millard

Personal details
- Party: Republican
- Children: 2
- Education: Capella University (BBA, MBA)

Robert Leadbeter is an American politician and businessman serving as a member of the Pennsylvania House of Representatives for the 109th district. Elected in November 2022, he assumed office on December 1, 2022.

== Education ==
Leadbeter earned a Bachelor of Business Administration degree and a Master of Business Administration degree from Capella University.

== Career ==
From 2012 to 2015, Leadbeter worked as a territory manager for Southern Glazer's Wine and Spirits. He joined AB InBev in 2015, working as a commercial director, national retail sales manager in the Northeast, and national director for draught products. He was elected to the Pennsylvania House of Representatives in November 2022. He serves as the chairman of the Pennsylvania Freedom Caucus.
