= Russell Redding =

American politician

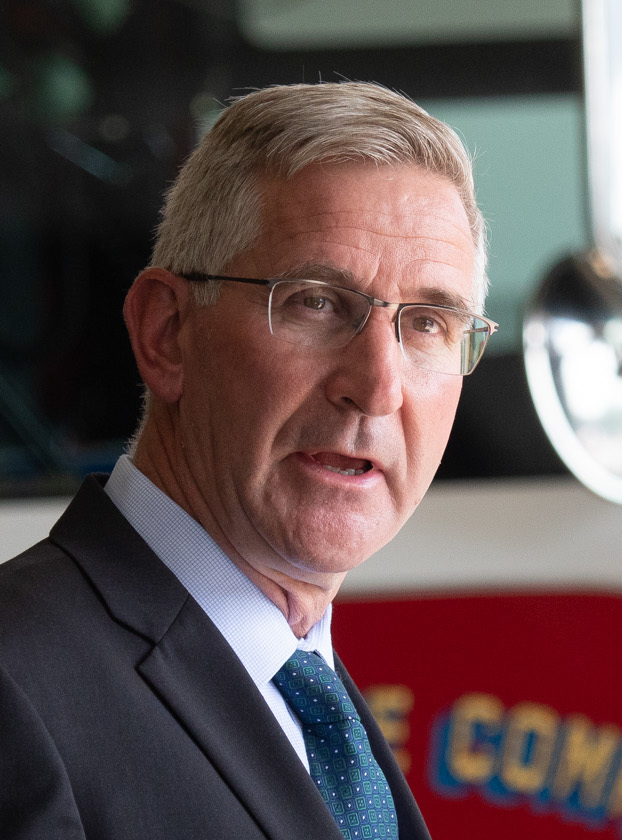

Secretary of Agriculture of Pennsylvania
- Incumbent
- Assumed office May 13, 2015
- Governor: Tom Wolf; Josh Shapiro
- Preceded by: George Greig
- In office December 18, 2009 – January 18, 2011
- Governor: Ed Rendell
- Preceded by: Dennis C. Wolff
- Succeeded by: George Greig

Personal details
- Political party: Democratic
- Spouse: Nina Redding
- Children: 2
- Education: Pennsylvania State University, University Park (BS, MS)

Russell C. Redding is an American politician who is the Pennsylvania Secretary of Agriculture, having been nominated by Pennsylvania Governor Tom Wolf and confirmed in May 2015 and again in May 2023 following his reappointment by Josh Shapiro. He had previously served in that role in the administration of Governor Ed Rendell from 2009 until 2011. He also served as an agricultural policy adviser to U.S. Senator Harris Wofford. He was the dean of the School of Agriculture and Environmental Sciences at Delaware Valley University. He serves as Chair of the USDA Advisory Committee on Biotechnology and 21st Century Agriculture.
