= Ted Stuban =

American politician

Member of the Pennsylvania House of Representatives from the 109th district
- In office 1977–1980
- Preceded by: Kent Shelhamer
- Succeeded by: John Gordner

Personal details
- Born: July 13, 1928 Berwick, Pennsylvania
- Died: November 27, 2013 (aged 85) Berwick, Pennsylvania
- Party: Democratic

Theodore "Ted" Stuban (July 13, 1928 – November 27, 2013) was a Democratic member of the Pennsylvania House of Representatives. He was first elected in the general election of 1976, taking office in 1977. He was reelected seven times, representing the 109th Legislative District through the end of the 1992 session. He retired from active political involvement with the end of his eighth term.

Born July 13, 1928 in Berwick, Pennsylvania. Stuban maintained a dual career as a licensed auctioneer while serving in the House. Prior to being elected to the legislature, Stuban held office as Mayor of Briar Creek Borough in Columbia County and also served on the Berwick Borough Council. He was of Ukrainian heritage. Stuban died in 2013.
