= Jamie Walsh =

Jamie Walsh may refer to:

- Jamie Walsh (rugby league) (fl. 1970s), English rugby league player
- Jamie Walsh (politician) (born c. 1975), American politician from Pennsylvania

== See also ==
- James Walsh (disambiguation)
