= Penrose Hallowell =

American politician (c.1928–2021)

Penrose Hallowell (c. 1928 – July 24, 2021) was an American politician and farmer who was Pennsylvania Secretary of Agriculture from 1979 to 1985.

== Personal life ==
Penrose Hallowell was born in Bucks County, Pennsylvania, c. 1928 to Joseph W. Hallowell Sr. He graduated from Pennsylvania State University in 1950, and the next year, began operating his own dairy farm in Ottsville, Pennsylvania, which he named Pennywell Farm. Hallowell married Marion, with whom he had four children. From 1977, Hallowell has shared the management of Pennywell Farm with his son John.

== Pennsylvania Department of Agriculture and later career ==
Hallowell was appointed by the incoming Dick Thornburgh gubernatorial administration in January 1979 to head the Pennsylvania Department of Agriculture. During his tenure, Hallowell lent support to the passage of Act 43, which led to the 1988 establishment of the Pennsylvania Farmland Preservation Program. Following the Three Mile Island accident in March 1979, Hallowell's office launched an investigation, which found that there were no problems due to radiation in livestock near the site. Hallowell did report economic losses to local farms that he attributed to the accident. In 1980, Hallowell started the "We're growing better" campaign.

In January 1985, a district magistrate ruled that Hallowell was guilty of shoplifting. An appeal was heard by judge William Vogel in Montgomery County Common Pleas Court, which reached the same verdict in April 1985. On April 3, 1985, Hallowell resigned his post at the Pennsylvania Department of Agriculture. Hallowell also vacated his seat on the Pennsylvania State University Board of Trustees. Hallowell later became a real estate agent.

Hallowell died July 24, 2021, at age 92.
