= Mark Shelhamer =

American human spaceflight researcher

Mark J. Shelhamer
- Education: Drexel University (BSEE) Massachusetts Institute of Technology (ScD) Johns Hopkins School of Medicine (Post-Doctoral)
- Scientific career
- Fields: Space medicine Human spaceflight Biomedical engineering Electrical engineering Nonlinear dynamics
- Workplaces: NASA Johnson Space Center; Johns Hopkins School of Medicine; George Washington University

Mark J. Shelhamer is an American human spaceflight researcher specializing in neurovestibular adaptation to space flight., and former chief scientist of NASA's Human Research Program. He is a Professor of Otolaryngology - Head and Neck Surgery at the Johns Hopkins School of Medicine, director of the Human Spaceflight Lab at Johns Hopkins, and director and founder of the Bioastronautics@Hopkins initiative. He is also an adjunct associate professor at George Washington University School of Medicine and Health Sciences. He has published over 70 scientific papers and is the author of Nonlinear Dynamics in Physiology: A State-Space Approach and Systems Medicine for Human Spaceflight. He holds several patents for various vestibular assessment devices.

Shelhamer is best known for his pioneering work on a multidisciplinary approach to human spaceflight research. He is also an informal expert on the history of NASA's early human spaceflight, including the Mercury, Gemini, and Apollo Programs.

== Life, education and research ==
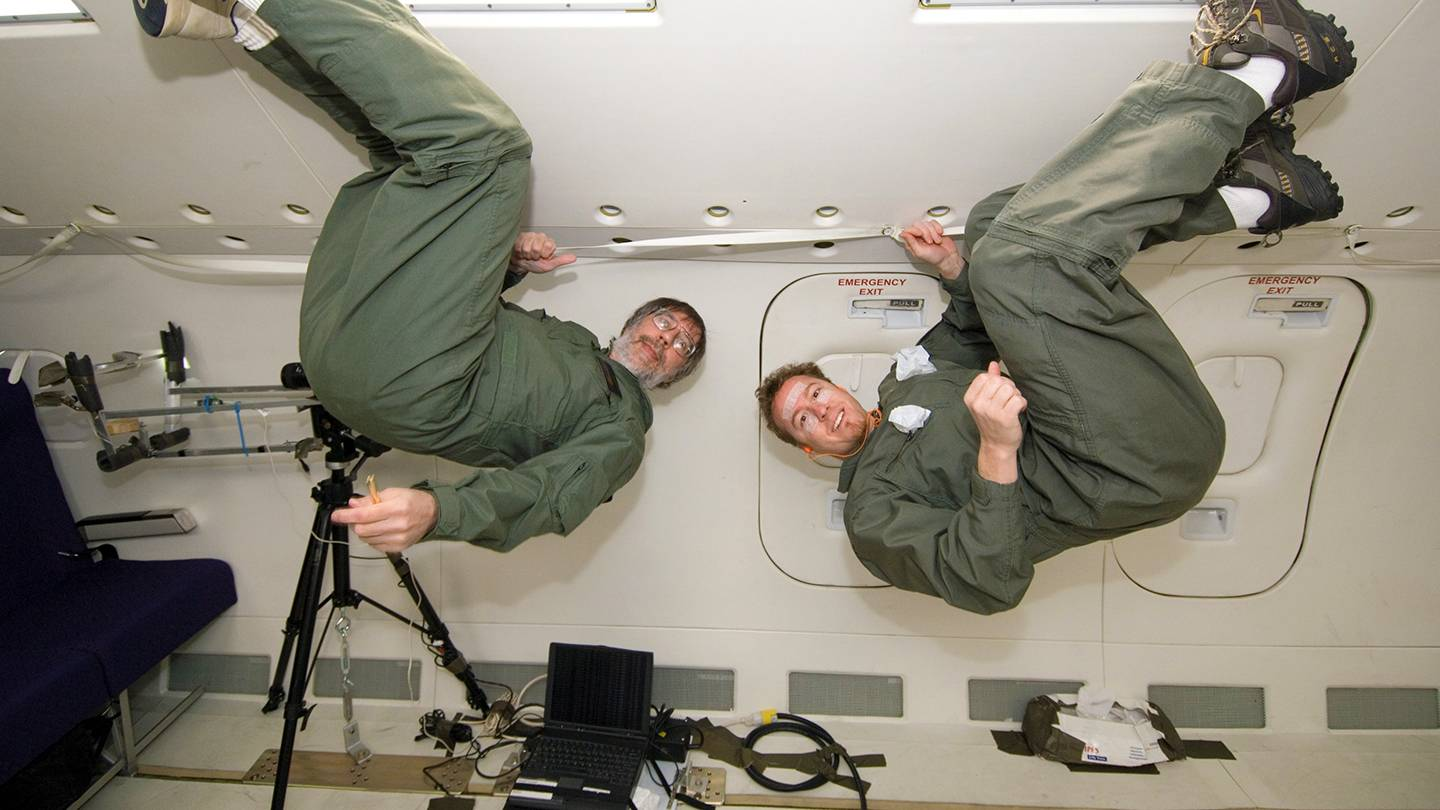
Shelhamer and Dr. Michael Schubert in parabolic flight testing neurovestibular adaptation in weightlessness.

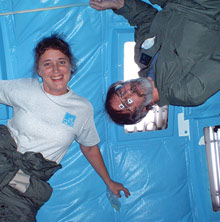
Dr. Jennifer Wiseman participating as a test subject in Shelhamer's parabolic flight experiment.

Shelhamer earned his Bachelor of Science and his Masters in electrical engineering in 1982 from Drexel University. Intrigued by his father's pacemaker and how it applied electrical engineering principles to a biological system, he attended Massachusetts Institute of Technology for biomedical engineering and earned his ScD in 1990. At MIT, Shelhamer worked with Dr. Laurence Young on sensorimotor physiology and adaptation with an emphasis on the vestibular and oculomotor systems. He applied nonlinear dynamical analysis to the control of eye movements, including investigations on the functional implications of fractal activity in physiological behavior. In parallel with this research, he studied astronaut adaptation to space flight and participated in two sets of Spacelab experiments (SL-1 and D-1). During this time, he flew on 80 parabolic flights with NASA's parabolic aircraft, also called the "vomit comet".

After MIT, Shelhamer went on to do his post-doctoral work at Johns Hopkins and continued as an associate professor until 2013, working on various vestibular and sensorimotor specific projects. At Hopkins, he developed the VAN/TAN (vertical and torsional alignment nulling) test, which aims to assess vestibular health through measurements of ocular misalignment. VAN/TAN is designed for space flight and clinical use, and has been tested on numerous parabolic flights. It was patented in 2012.

From 2013 to 2016, he took a leave of absence to serve as Chief Scientist of the NASA Human Research Program. As a chief scientist, he oversaw research aimed to understand and mitigate risks of human spaceflight, including the Twin Study. Through his position at NASA, he realized that the health risks of space flight must be viewed as interrelated factors rather than individual ones. He now works to encourage the human spaceflight research community, including larger organizations like the NASA Human Research Program, to standardize this multidisciplinary approach.

In 2016, Shelhamer returned to Hopkins with the goal of creating an academic counterpart to the NASA Human Research Program that encourages cross-disciplinary research. His current work includes connecting scientists from various fields and encouraging them to find synergies in their research and collaborate to mitigate the health risks of space. At Hopkins, he focuses on expanding and bringing awareness to human spaceflight research, and conducts his own lab research on astronaut adaptation and resilience in space. Shelhamer currently directs the Human Spaceflight Lab, where students have the opportunity to participate in human spaceflight research under his guidance. On February 24, 2021, he hosted the kickoff for Bioastronautics@Hopkins.

Outside of his research, Shelhamer is a ham radio hobbyist and an avid drummer. In his free time, he enjoys tinkering with radios and other electronics, playing the drums with his band, and spending time with cats

== Awards ==
- NASA Group Achievement Award, for Life Sciences Experiments on Spacelab-1 - 1984
- Whitaker Health Sciences Fund Fellowship - 1986-1988
- Award for outstanding contributions to the MIT Man-Vehicle Laboratory 1989
- Senior Member, IEEE - 2007
- Best paper award, Eye Tracking Research and Applications meeting - 2008
- NASA JSC “On the Spot” Award, for reducing ISS crew time requirements - 2015
