= Wild Mouse (Idlewild) =

Roller coaster in Pennsylvania, United States

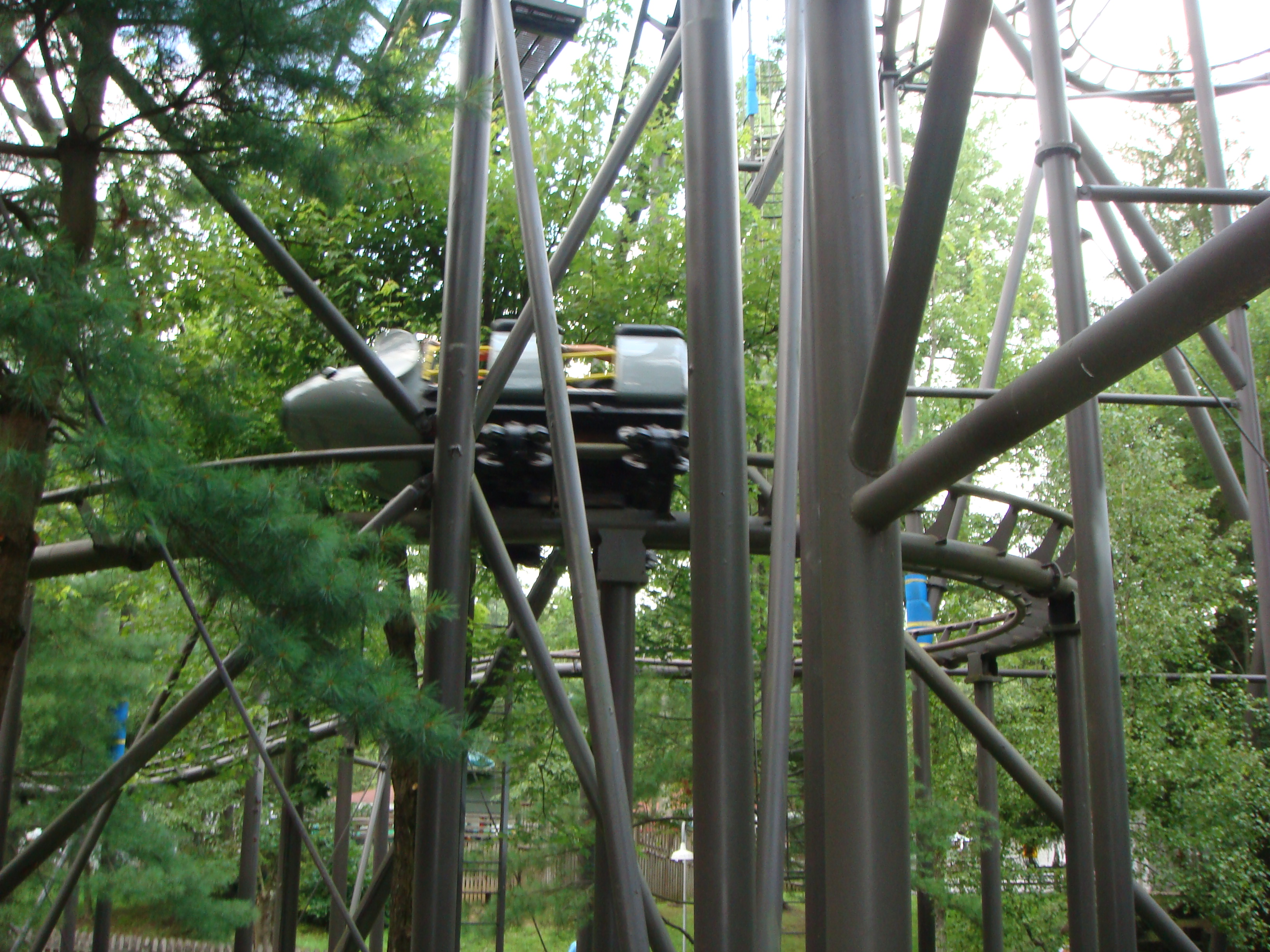

Idlewild and Soak Zone
- Location: Idlewild and Soak Zone
- Coordinates: 40.2598°N 79.2799°W
- Status: Operating
- Opening date: May 15, 1993

General statistics
- Type: Steel
- Manufacturer: Vekoma
- Track layout: Wild mouse
- Lift/launch system: Chain lift hill
- Height: 56 ft (17 m)
- Length: 1,640 ft (500 m)
- Speed: 30 mph (48 km/h)
- Inversions: 0
- Height restriction: 48 in (122 cm)
- Vehicles: 6 cars. Riders are arranged 2 across in 2 rows for a total of 4 riders per car.
- Wild Mouse at RCDB

Wild Mouse is a steel wild mouse roller coaster at Idlewild and Soak Zone in Ligonier, Pennsylvania, United States. The wild mouse coaster is the only one of its kind built by Vekoma, and it first opened in 1985 at Prater in Austria. It operated for a time at Alton Towers in England before it was moved to Idlewild, where it reopened in 1993 and has operated ever since.

== History ==
Wild Mouse was originally located at the Prater amusement park in Vienna, Austria, where it operated as Speeedy Gonzalez from 1985 to 1987. It was then moved to Alton Towers, an amusement park in Staffordshire, England, where it was renamed Alton Mouse and reopened in 1988. It operated there until 1991.

On May 15, 1993, Alton Mouse reopened at Idlewild as Wild Mouse. The coaster's rough air brakes hindered its ride experience until 2002, when a smoother magnetic braking system was installed by Pribonics Technologies.

The ride did not operate during the 2012 season. It reopened to the public on July 14, 2013.

Following the end of the 2024 season, the ride underwent a large refurbishment, most notably including the addition of a new electrical system. The ride reopened on June 28th, 2025.
