= Pennsylvania Department of Agriculture =

Agency of the Commonwealth of Pennsylvania

- Logo of the PDA

Agency overview
- Formed: 1895
- Jurisdiction: Government of Pennsylvania
- Headquarters: 2301 North Cameron Street; Harrisburg, Pennsylvania; 40°17′15″N 76°52′51″W
- Annual budget: $232.6 million (FY 2010)
- Agency executive: Russell Redding, Secretary of Agriculture
- Website: www.agriculture.state.pa.us

The Pennsylvania Department of Agriculture (PDA) is a cabinet-level agency in Pennsylvania. The department's purpose is to support a sustainable and safe supply of food and agricultural products; be good stewards of the land and natural resources; promote the viability of farms; protect consumers; and safeguard the health of people, plants, animals and the environment.

The department is under the direction and supervision of the Secretary of Agriculture, who is appointed by the Governor of Pennsylvania with the approval of the Pennsylvania Senate. The current Secretary of Agriculture, Russell Redding, was appointed by Governor Tom Wolf in January 2015 and confirmed in May 2015.

== Secretaries of Agriculture ==
- Russell Redding (Confirmed May 2015)
- George Greig (Confirmed May 2011)
- Russell Redding (Confirmed December 2009)
- Dennis C. Wolff (Confirmed May 2003)
- Samuel E. Hayes Jr. (Appointed May 1997)
- Charles C. Brosius (Appointed March 1995)
- Boyd E. Wolff (Appointed January 1987)
- Richard E. Grubb (Appointed May 1985)
- Penrose Hallowell (Appointed January 1979)
- Kent D. Shelhamer (Appointed February 1977)
- Raymond J. Kerstetter (Appointed March 1976)
- James A. McHale (Appointed January 1971)
- Leland H. Bull (Appointed January 1963)
- William L. Henning (Appointed January 1955)
- W. S. Hagar (Appointed November 1954)
- Miles Horst (Appointed January 1943)

== Organization ==
The department is under the direction and supervision of the secretary of Agriculture, who is appointed by the governor of Pennsylvania. The secretary is assisted in managing the department by an executive deputy secretary, two deputy secretaries and a special deputy secretary. The department is subdivided into program bureaus, each headed by a bureau director. Bureaus are further subdivided into divisions.

- Secretary of Agriculture
  - Executive Deputy Secretary
    - Deputy Secretary for Agriculture and Consumer Protection
      - Farmland Preservation Bureau
        - Agricultural Conservation Easements Division
        - Land Use and Natural Resources Division
      - Farm Show Bureau
        - Show Management Division
        - Operations and Maintenance Division
        - Safety and Security Division
      - Animal Health and Diagonistic Services Bureau
        - Animal Health Division
        - Regulation and Compliance Division
        - Veterinary Laboratories Division
      - Food Safety and Laboratory Services Bureau
        - Food Safety Division
        - Milk Sanitation Division
        - Laboratories Division
        - Eggs, Fruits and Vegetables Inspection Division
      - Ride and Measurement Services Bureau
        - Amusement Ride Division
        - Weights and Measures Division
    - Deputy Secretary for Marketing and Economic Development
      - Plant Industry Bureau
        - Plant Protection Division
        - Health and Safety Division
        - Agronomic and Reguibak Services Division
      - Market Development Bureau
        - Livestock Marketing and Grading Division
        - Economic Development Division
        - Agricultural Marketing Division
      - Food Distribution Bureau
        - Federal Commity Division
        - Food Assistance Division
        - Field Operations Division
    - Special Deputy Secretary for Dog Law Enforcement
      - Dog Law Enforcement Bureau
    - Administrative Services Bureau
      - Office Services Division
      - Contracting and Procurement Division
    - Human Resources Office
    - Regional Offices
    - Information Technology Services Office

== Incidents ==
In 2014, the Pennsylvania Department of Agriculture caused a seed-lending library to shut down and promised to curtail any similar efforts in the state. The lending library, hosted by a town library, allowed gardeners to "check out" a package of open-pollinated seed, and "return" seeds kept from the crop grown from those seeds. The Department of Agriculture said that this activity raises the possibility of "agro-terrorism", and that a Seed Act of 2004 requires the library staff to test each seed packet for germination rate and whether the seed was true to type. In 2016 the department reversed this decision, and clarified that seed libraries and non-commercial seed exchanges are not subject to the requirements of the Seed Act.

== See also ==
- List of Pennsylvania state agencies
