= Preclearance =

Preclearance may refer to:

- United States border preclearance, allowing U.S.-bound passengers to clear border inspection at established locations outside the country
- The preclearance requirement, Section 5 of the U.S. Voting Rights Act of 1965
