= DHS Chemical and Biological Defense Division =

Agency overview
- Formed: 2003
- Jurisdiction: United States
- Headquarters: DHS Nebraska Avenue Complex, Washington D.C.
- Agency executive: S. Randolph Long, Acting Director
- Parent agency: DHS Science and Technology Directorate
- Website: DHS Chemical and Biological Defense Division

The Chemical and Biological Defense Division (CBD) is a division of the Science and Technology Directorate of the United States Department of Homeland Security. Within the Homeland Security Advanced Research Projects Agency, CBD develops technologies to increase the United States's preparedness and protect key national infrastructure against chemical, biological, and agricultural threats and disasters through improved threat awareness and advanced surveillance, detection, and protective countermeasures.

== Overview ==
The 2007 High Priority Technical Needs brochure published by Homeland Security defines critical focus areas for chemical and biological research, falling primarily under the category of "chemical/biological weapons defense":

- Tools to detect and mitigate animal disease breakouts
- Policy net assessments to provide fresh perspectives on fundamental elements of the national biodefense strategy
- Improved tools for integrated CBRN Risk Assessment
- Incident characterization capability for response & restoration
- Improved ChemBio Forensic Analysis capability
- National-scale detection architectures and strategies to address outdoor, indoor (e.g., highly trafficked transportation hubs) and critical infrastructure
- Consequence assessments of attacks on chemical facilities and Chem Bio attacks on other critical infrastructure
- Integrated CBRNE Sensor Reporting capability
- Handheld rapid biological and chemical detection systems
- Detection paradigms and systems for enhanced, emerging and novel biological threats

== See also ==
- Chemical Facility Anti-Terrorism Standards
