= CFAT =

CFAT may refer to:

- Carnegie Foundation for the Advancement of Teaching
- Crédit Foncier d'Algérie et de Tunisie, a defunct French bank

== See also ==
- Chemical Facility Anti-Terrorism Standards (CFATS)
