= Preclearance Authorization Act of 2014 =

- Long title: To establish the conditions under which the Secretary of Homeland Security may establish preclearance facilities, conduct preclearance operations, and provide customs services outside the United States, and for other purposes.
- Announced in: the 113th United States Congress
- Sponsored by: Rep. Patrick Meehan (R, PA-7)
- Number of co-sponsors: 61

Codification
- Agencies affected: Government Accountability Office, United States Department of Transportation, Department of Homeland Security

Legislative history
- Introduced in the House as H.R. 3488 by Rep. Patrick Meehan (R, PA-7) on November 14, 2013; Committee consideration by United States House Committee on Homeland Security, United States House Committee on Ways and Means, United States House Homeland Security Subcommittee on Border and Maritime Security

The Preclearance Authorization Act of 2014 (H.R. 3488) is a bill that would authorize the United States Secretary of Homeland Security (DHS) to establish preclearance facilities, conduct preclearance operations, or provide customs services outside of the United States of America to prevent terrorists, terrorist instruments, and other national security threats from gaining access to the United States.

The bill was introduced into the United States House of Representatives during the 113th United States Congress.

== Background ==
Travelers who undergo the pre-clearance procedures at one of these facilities in a foreign airport do not have to go through U.S. customs upon their arrival in the United States.

== Provisions of the bill ==
This summary is based largely on the summary provided by the Congressional Research Service, a public domain source.

The Preclearance Authorization Act of 2014 would authorize the United States Secretary of Homeland Security (DHS) to establish preclearance facilities, conduct preclearance operations, or provide customs services outside of the United States of America to prevent terrorists, terrorist instruments, and other national security threats from gaining access to the United States.

The bill would declare such requirements shall not apply to any preclearance facility that was in operation outside of the United States before enactment of this Act.

The bill would declare that any preclearance facility located, preclearance operations conducted, or customs services provided at Abu Dhabi International Airport, Al Maktoum International Airport, Dubai International Airport in the United Arab Emirates, or Doha International Airport in Qatar shall not be considered to have been in operation, conducted, or provided before enactment of this Act. Prohibits such facility, operations, or services from being established, conducted, or provided at any of such airports on or after such enactment.

The bill would require the Secretary, not later than 180 days before entering into any agreement to establish a preclearance facility, conduct preclearance operations, or provide customs services outside of the United States, to: (1) notify Congress and the Government Accountability Office (GAO) of the intent to establish such facility, conduct such operations, or provide such services; as well as (2) assess any impacts on passengers traveling to the United States, or economic or security impacts on the United States.

== Congressional Budget Office report ==
This summary is based largely on the summary provided by the Congressional Budget Office, as ordered reported by the House Committee on Homeland Security on June 11, 2014. This is a public domain source.

H.R. 3488 would authorize Customs and Border Protection (CBP) in the United States Department of Homeland Security to establish preclearance (inspection) stations in foreign countries. CBP currently operates preclearance facilities in about a dozen locations, mostly in Canada. The bill would require the agency to notify the Congress before establishing preclearance stations in countries that currently have none. H.R. 3488 also would specify policies and requirements to ensure that aviation security screening performed at foreign airports engaged in preclearance operations meet U.S. standards.

CBP anticipates opening new preclearance stations over the next several years and can do so under current law, so we estimate that implementing the bill would not significantly affect agency spending. The Congressional Budget Office (CBO) also expects that implementing the bill’s requirements related to aviation security would not significantly affect federal costs. Enacting the legislation would not affect direct spending or revenues; therefore, pay-as-you-go procedures do not apply.

H.R. 3488 contains no intergovernmental or private-sector mandates as defined in the Unfunded Mandates Reform Act and would not affect the budgets of state, local, or tribal governments.

== Procedural history ==
The Preclearance Authorization Act of 2014 was introduced into the United States House of Representatives on November 14, 2013 by Rep. Patrick Meehan (R, PA-7). It was referred to the United States House Committee on Homeland Security, the United States House Committee on Ways and Means, and the United States House Homeland Security Subcommittee on Border and Maritime Security. On July 3, 2014, the bill was reported (amended) by the Committee on Homeland Security alongside House Report 113-511 part 1. The House was scheduled to vote on the bill on July 8, 2014, under a suspension of the rules.

== Debate and discussion ==
Rep. Pat Meehan, who introduced the bill, indicated that the goal of the bill is to prevent the Customs Bureau from opening a pre-clearance facility at Abu Dhabi International Airport in the United Arab Emirates because one airline there currently flies to the United States. That airline is Etihad, a state-run airline, that supporters of the bill wish to avoid giving an unfair competitive advantage that might result from travelers flying on Etihad through that airport in order to take advantage of the chance to be pre-cleared, and opportunity passengers on other airlines would not have.

According to the American Association of Airport Executives, the bill is supported by the U.S. airline industry. The Air Line Pilots Association lobbied in favor of the bill.

== See also ==
- List of bills in the 113th United States Congress
- United States border preclearance
