= Pat Meehan =

American politician (born 1955)

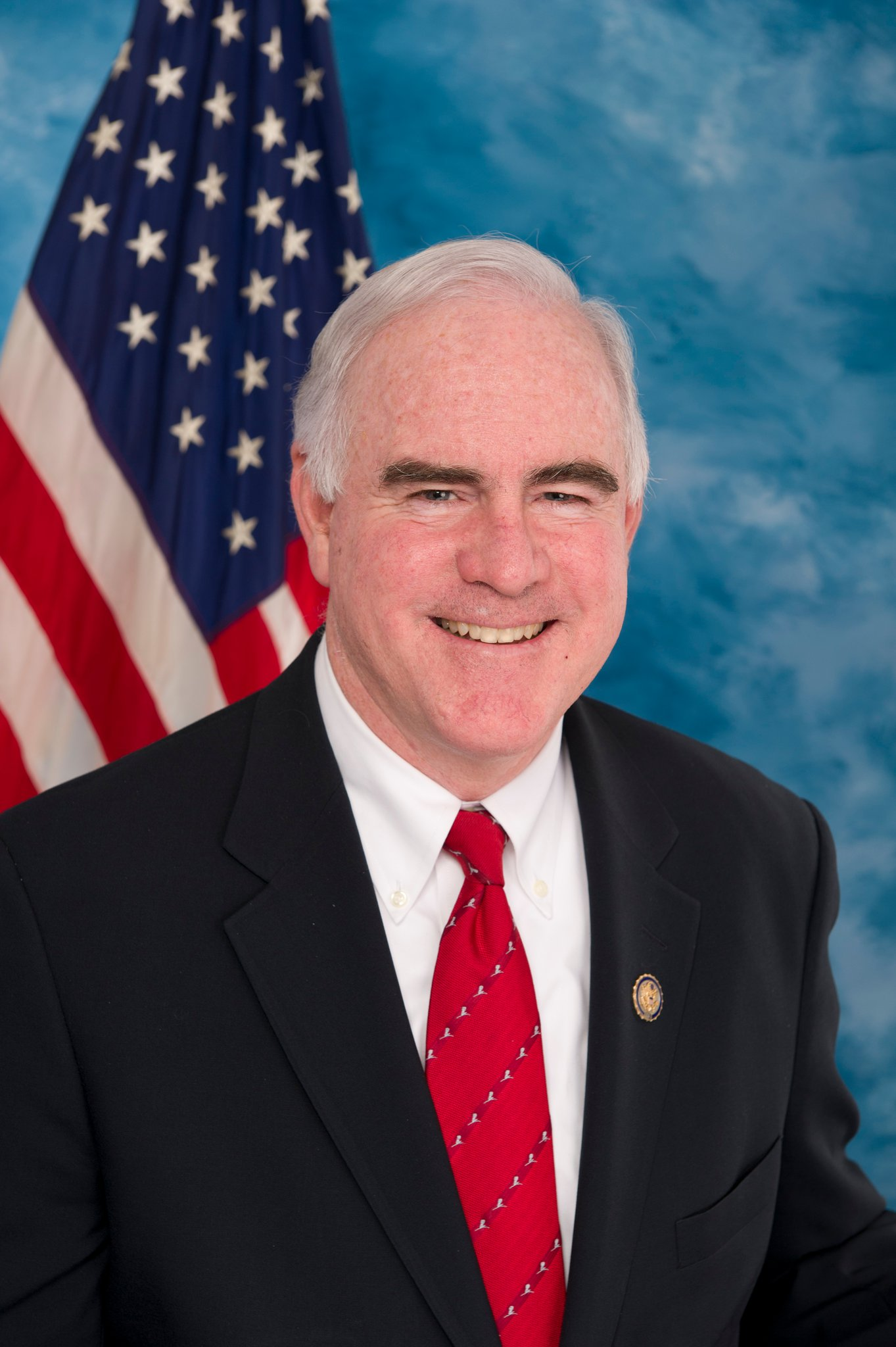

Member of the U.S. House of Representatives from Pennsylvania's 7th district
- In office January 3, 2011 – April 27, 2018
- Preceded by: Joe Sestak
- Succeeded by: Mary Gay Scanlon

United States Attorney for the Eastern District of Pennsylvania
- In office September 17, 2001 – July 15, 2008
- President: George W. Bush
- Preceded by: Michael R. Stiles
- Succeeded by: Laurie Magid (acting)

District Attorney of Delaware County
- In office January 9, 1996 – September 17, 2001
- Preceded by: William H. Ryan Jr.
- Succeeded by: Patricia Holsten

Personal details
- Born: Patrick Leo Meehan; October 20, 1955 (age 70) Cheltenham, Pennsylvania, U.S.
- Party: Republican
- Spouse: Carolyn Meehan
- Education: Bowdoin College (BA); Temple University (JD)

Patrick Leo Meehan (born October 20, 1955) is a former American Republican Party politician and federal prosecutor from Pennsylvania who represented parts of Delaware, Chester, Montgomery, Berks, and Lancaster counties in the United States House of Representatives from 2011 until his resignation in 2018. He succeeded Democrat Joe Sestak, who ran unsuccessfully for the United States Senate.

A graduate of Bowdoin College and Temple University, Meehan previously served as United States Attorney for the Eastern District of Pennsylvania (2001–2008) and as district attorney of Delaware County, Pennsylvania (1996–2001).

In January 2018, following the revelation that he used taxpayers' money to settle a sexual harassment claim brought by a female staff member, Meehan announced that he would retire from Congress at the end of his current term, and not seek re-election in 2018. On April 27, 2018, Meehan resigned and said he would pay back the taxpayer funds used for the settlement. Democrat Mary Gay Scanlon won both a special and general election on the day of that year's midterms in November to succeed him.

== Early life ==
Born and raised in Cheltenham Township, Pennsylvania by his parents Leo and Julia, Meehan is one of four siblings.

He attended Bowdoin College in Maine, graduating in 1978 with a Bachelor of Arts degree. While at Bowdoin, Meehan was a standout hockey player and went on to work as a National Hockey League referee from 1979 to 1982. Meehan attended Temple Law School in Philadelphia, Pennsylvania, and graduated in 1986 with his Juris Doctor degree.

Meehan's career in public service and politics began in 1979 when he worked with Republican candidate David Marston on his Philadelphia mayoral campaign. A year later, he worked on Roy Zimmerman's campaign for Pennsylvania Attorney General. Meehan went on to serve as Special Counsel to U.S. Senator Arlen Specter. He was a campaign manager for U.S. Senator Rick Santorum, Philadelphia D.A. Ron Castille, and State Attorney General Ernie Preate. After graduating from law school in 1986, Meehan went to work as an associate at the law firm Dilworth Paxson LLP.

== District Attorney (1996–2001) ==
In 1995 and 1999, Meehan was elected the District Attorney of Delaware County as a Republican. During Meehan's tenure, his staff prosecuted several high-profile cases, including the Du Pont Murder Trial, (a case involving the murder of Olympic wrestler David Schultz by his millionaire benefactor John Eleuthère du Pont) and the 1996 murder of a 22-year-old college student named Aimee Willard (who was abducted from Route 476 and found in an abandoned lot in North Philadelphia).

While serving as District Attorney, Meehan set up the Special Victims Unit for Domestic Violence in Delaware County, offering victims protection from their alleged abusers by allowing the prosecution to occur without the victims testifying in open court. As D.A., he also focused on protecting youth by expanding the Youth Aid Panel program for first time offenders and creating a truancy project to limit youth-related crime during the day. Meehan established the United States Department of Justice's Internet Crimes Against Children Task Force (ICAC) in Pennsylvania. The ICAC is a special unit of detectives who investigate online predators on the web and bring them to justice; it has become a model across the country.

== U.S. Attorney (2001–2008) ==
Meehan became the United States Attorney for the Eastern District of Pennsylvania on September 17, 2001, six days after the September 11, 2001 attacks. He was appointed by President George W. Bush and confirmed by the United States Senate. Meehan headed an office of over 200 lawyers and staff backed up by the Federal Bureau of Investigation (FBI), the Bureau of Alcohol, Tobacco, Firearms and Explosives (ATF), the Department of Homeland Security (DHS) and the U.S. Postal Inspection Service Office. As U.S. Attorney, Meehan made terrorism, gang-related crime, child internet safety, and public corruption priorities for his criminal division. Public corruption in Philadelphia in particular was brought to the spotlight in 2003 when an FBI electronic listening device was found in the Philadelphia Mayor's office.

In light of the September 11 terrorist attacks, Meehan formed the Anti-Terrorism Task Force (ATTF), later renamed the Anti-Terrorism Advisory Council (ATAC) in the Eastern District of Pennsylvania to evaluate and prevent future terrorist attacks. This initiative was done in partnership with local, state and federal law enforcement and emergency responders. The ATAC has led large-scale exercises on biological attacks and the poisoning of the food supply in partnership with Saint Joseph's University in order to help Eastern Pennsylvania prepare for terrorist attacks.

Recognizing the expansion of gang-related activity in the eastern part of Pennsylvania, Meehan sought a $2.5 million Department of Justice grant to fight and prevent gang violence for the region. The unique "Route 222 Corridor Anti-Gang Initiative" brought together elected officials and law enforcement personnel with community groups to fight gangs in a rural area unfamiliar with big-city gang violence. The money was divided among enforcement, prevention and rehabilitation. The program aimed not only to increase arrests, but also to fund school programs and community centers to educate youth about alternatives to gang life.

Continuing the work he began while he was Delaware County D.A., Meehan made child safety on the internet a priority, sponsoring internet safety training seminars with Web Wise Kids and visiting local schools. Meehan's office prosecuted substandard nursing homes and elder care facilities, and nefarious lenders who offered ill-advised loans to disadvantaged homeowners. The U.S. Attorney's Office under Meehan was nationally recognized for its work in the field of health-care fraud. The office won more than half a billion dollars in settlements against some of the largest pharmaceutical companies and pharmacy benefit managers, ensuring better self-policing and oversight by the industry.

He announced on July 16, 2008, that he was joining the Philadelphia law firm of Conrad O'Brien Gellman & Rohn.

=== Public corruption cases ===
Though he has been active in a wide variety of areas, it has been several high-profile public corruption cases that have put Meehan in the headlines. Meehan has said, "Pay to play cannot be standard operating procedure in city government."

This was brought to national attention on October 7, 2003, when Philadelphia Police conducted a sweep of Mayor John F. Street's office and found an electronic listening device. It was later discovered that the "bug" had been planted by the FBI as part of a city corruption investigation. Street was never charged in the investigation. Philadelphia officials and the mayor were outraged, especially with the timing coinciding with the Philadelphia mayoral election on November 4, 2003. Street's campaign spokesman accused the federal government of attempting to influence the election (which Street ended up winning anyway). Meehan was applauded in the press and in the city for his handling of the situation, which resulted in twelve indictments including that of Street confidant Ronald White (who died before he could stand trial) and city treasurer Corey Kemp, who was convicted and sentenced to ten years in federal prison.

Other officials prosecuted by Meehan's office included former city councilman Rick Mariano (who was sentenced to six and a half years in federal prison for accepting bribes and attempting to influence city contracts), the President of the Independence Seaport Museum John S. Carter (who was sentenced to 15 years for cheating the museum out of $1.5 million), Montgomery County accountant Denis Shusterman (for embezzling $10 million, he received a 14-year sentence), and State Senator Vincent Fumo (who was convicted on a 139-count indictment including fraud, conspiracy and obstruction of justice charges; Fumo received a five-year sentence).

Meehan was appointed to the U.S. House Ethics Committee during the 113th Congress. The Speaker of the House summarily removed him from the committee in January 2018, and directed Meehan to repay to taxpayers the full cost of his secret sexual harassment settlement.

== U.S. House of Representatives (2011–2018) ==
=== Elections ===
Pennsylvania's 7th district during Meehan's term

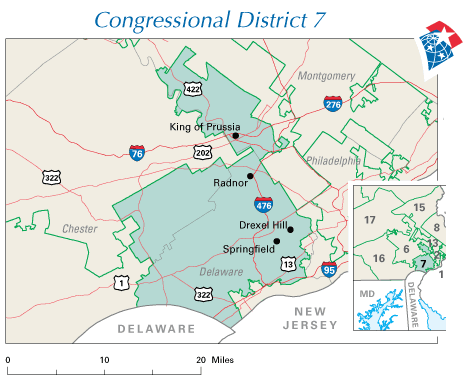
The 7th district before 2012

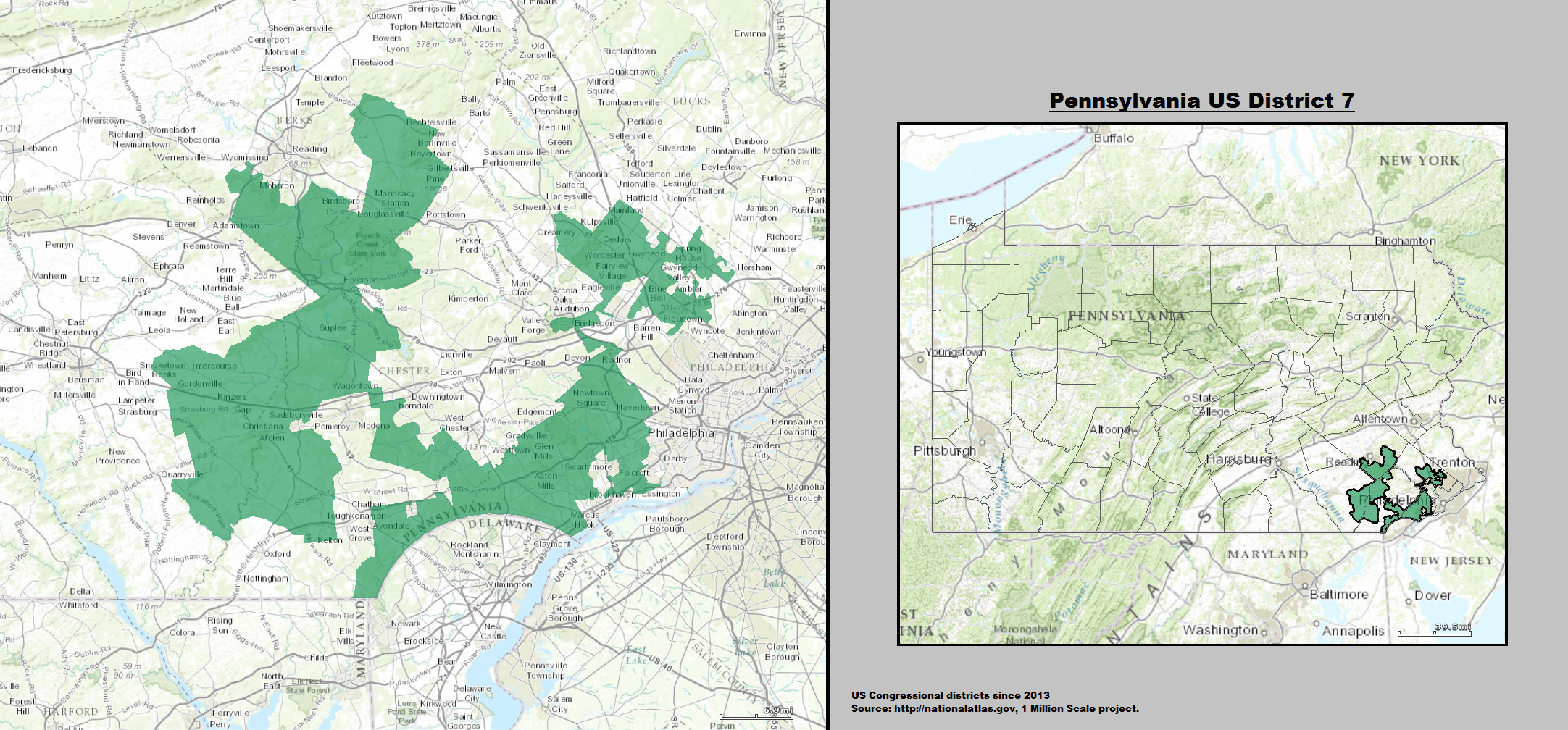
and after 2012.

2010

Meehan began his campaign for Pennsylvania governor in 2008. On August 7, 2009, however, he announced that he was ending his exploratory bid and would instead run for Congress. Reports indicated that another candidate, Pennsylvania Attorney General Tom Corbett, was too far ahead of Meehan in fundraising and endorsements.

Meehan ran in Pennsylvania's 7th congressional district election, vacated by Joe Sestak, who defeated U.S. Senator Arlen Specter in 2010 in the Democratic Party primary, but lost to Republican Pat Toomey in the general election. Meehan ran unopposed for the Republican Party nomination in the May 18, 2010, Republican primary.

To appear on the primary election ballot a candidate for Congress in Pennsylvania is required to collect valid signatures of 1,000 registered voters in the congressional district. When evidence of fraud in some of Meehan's petitions was discovered by the Meehan campaign, Meehan alerted the Delaware County District Attorney. Michael Green, the District Attorney and Meehan supporter, turned over the matter to the office of the Pennsylvania Attorney General. Because the Attorney General, Tom Corbett, is the Republican candidate for governor, Lentz requested that the United States Department of Justice take over the investigation. Paul Summers, a Republican campaign operative and volunteer, was charged with seven counts of forgery and seven counts of making false signatures. He was convicted on seven of the charges after pleading guilty as part of a plea-bargain deal.

Meehan defeated Democratic State Representative Bryan Lentz 55%–44%.

2012

Meehan won re-election to a second term with 60% of the vote over Democrat George Badey.

2014

Meehan won re-election in 2014, defeating Democrat Mary Ellen Balchunis with 62% of the vote.

2016

Meehan ran for re-election in 2016. He defeated Stan Casacio in the Republican primary. He defeated Democrat Mary Ellen Balchunis in the general election with 60% of the vote. The general election was held on November 8, 2016. As the election concluded, Meehan easily won another term with 219,314 votes, which was 59.7%. Meehan won all the counties in the 7th Congressional District that include Delaware, Montgomery, Chester, Berks, and Lancaster counties. This is Meehan's fourth term in the 7th Congressional District. This election was a rematch of the election between Meehan and Balchinis in 2014. The difference between this election and the one in 2014 is that this election occurred during a Presidential election year.

Meehan's 7th district had been considered the poster child for egregious gerrymandering and its shape compared to an alien character from the classic arcade game Space Invaders. In January 2018, the Pennsylvania Supreme Court ruled the boundaries of the 7th and other Pennsylvania districts as unconstitutional.

On April 27, 2018, Meehan resigned from Congress amid sexual misconduct allegations.

=== Tenure ===
Meehan was sworn in on January 5, 2011. He was appointed to serve as one of three freshman members on the House Republican Steering Committee and became one of the few House freshmen to chair a subcommittee. Meehan was ranked as the 35th most bipartisan member of the U.S. House of Representatives during the 114th United States Congress (and the second most bipartisan member of the U.S. House of Representatives from Pennsylvania) in the Bipartisan Index created by The Lugar Center and the McCourt School of Public Policy.

Meehan supported reauthorization of the Violence Against Women Act.

In February 2017, while serving on the Ways and Means Committee, he voted against a measure that would have led to a request of the Treasury Department for President Donald Trump's tax returns. The measure failed 23–15 on a party-line, with all 23 Republicans voting against the measure.

=== Committee assignments ===
- Committee on Homeland Security
  - Subcommittee on Counterterrorism and Intelligence
  - Subcommittee on Cybersecurity, Infrastructure Protection, and Security Technologies (Chairman)
- Committee on Oversight and Government Reform
  - Subcommittee on TARP, Financial Services and Bailouts of Public and Private Programs
  - Subcommittee on Technology, Information Policy, Intergovernmental Relations and Procurement Reform
- Committee on Transportation and Infrastructure
  - United States House Transportation Subcommittee on Railroads, Pipelines, and Hazardous Materials
  - United States House Transportation Subcommittee on Aviation
  - United States House Transportation Subcommittee on Economic Development, Public Buildings and Emergency Management
- United States House Committee on Ethics

== Political positions ==
=== Economy ===
As far as fiscal policy, he voted for the Budget Control Act of 2011, Cut, Cap and Balance Act, and voted to defund NPR. Among bills that became law, he voted for the Leahy-Smith America Invents Act and to extend the Patriot Act.

Meehan has introduced the Jump Start for Job Creators Act, legislation that would encourage entrepreneurs to create jobs by increasing the maximum tax deduction for small business start-up expenses. Meehan has led the effort to preserve funding for the V-22 Osprey, an advanced military aircraft manufactured in Meehan's district.

In June, Meehan announced that six Chester County fire companies in Pennsylvania will receive $430,000 in federal grants to purchase new radios and rescue equipment.

In November 2015, Meehan's H.R. 1314, The Bipartisan Budget Act of 2015, was enacted into law, avoiding a government shutdown.

=== Healthcare ===
Meehan has voted to repeal the Patient Protection and Affordable Care Act.

Although he voted the bill out of Ways and Means Committee, Meehan opposed his own party and voted against the American Health Care Act of 2017, arguing that the bill's economic effects were insufficiently known and that the replacement did not adequately fund insurance for sick people.

=== Homeland security ===
On November 14, 2013, Meehan introduced the Preclearance Authorization Act of 2014 (H.R. 3488; 113th Congress), a bill that would authorize the United States Secretary of Homeland Security (DHS) to establish preclearance facilities, conduct preclearance operations, or provide customs services outside of the United States of America to prevent terrorists, terrorist instruments, and other national security threats from gaining access to the United States.

On February 6, 2014, Meehan introduced the Chemical Facility Anti-Terrorism Standards Program Authorization and Accountability Act of 2014 (H.R. 4007; 113th Congress), a bill that would make permanent the United States Department of Homeland Security's (DHS's) authority to regulate security at certain chemical facilities in the United States. Under the Chemical Facility Anti-Terrorism Standards (CFATS) program, DHS collects and reviews information from chemical facilities in the United States to determine which facilities present security risks and then requires them to write and enact security plans.

As a member of the House Committee on Homeland Security, Meehan chairs the Subcommittee on Counterterrorism and Intelligence. Meehan has held hearings to investigate issues such as Iran's ties to terrorism and the risks posed by extremists in Pakistan.

=== Other ===
Meehan introduced legislation, titled the 'Critical Infrastructure Research and Development Advancement Act of 2013' (CIRDA), that passed the subcommittee on Cybersecurity, Infrastructure Protection and Security Technologies in 2013. The bill aims to make key improvements in security for important infrastructure. The measure calls for expansion in research and development for security technology as well as implementing a new strategy in dealing with cyber threats that the Department of Homeland Security faces. This bill would also streamline sharing of these technologies to many other branches of government, thus making them more secure as a whole.

In 2013, Meehan introduced a bill called the Critical Infrastructure Research and Development Advancement Act of 2013 (H.R. 2952; 113th Congress). If signed into law, the bill would require more oversight of the Department of Homeland Security's cybersecurity goals, according to Ripon Advance. The bill would require DHS to transmit to the Congress a strategic plan for research and development efforts addressing the protection of critical infrastructure and a report on departmental use of public-private consortiums to develop technology to protect such infrastructure. On January 16, 2014, the United States House Homeland Security Subcommittee on Cybersecurity, Infrastructure Protection, and Security Technologies passed the bill, and in February the full Homeland Security Committee approved the bill. On July 28, 2014, the House voted to pass the bill in a voice vote.

== Sexual harassment settlement ==
The New York Times revealed in January 2018 that Meehan used taxpayers' money to settle a sexual harassment claim brought by a female staff member. After the alleged victim rejected his advances, Meehan allegedly grew hostile. The staff member began remote work to avoid Meehan's advances and ultimately left the job. Following the report, Meehan denied the allegations against him. He was removed from the U.S. House Ethics Committee.

A few days later in an interview with the Philadelphia Inquirer, Meehan denied harassment and said he was not sexually interested in the staffer, though explained she was his "soul mate" and he had reacted poorly to learning she had a new boyfriend. Another two days later, on January 25, 2018, Meehan announced that he would retire from Congress at the end of his current term, and not seek re-election in 2018. He said he would repay the taxpayer money if the Ethics Committee determines he committed sexual harassment. He also responded regarding his prior use of the term "soul mate". On April 27, 2018, he abruptly resigned, saying that his intent is to repay the $39,000 settlement funds within 30 days of his resignation because "I did not want to leave with any question of violating the trust of taxpayers."

== Post-political career ==
Following his resignation from Congress, Meehan worked as a consultant, forming the firm Harvey Run Strategies, and registered as a lobbyist.

== Personal life ==
Meehan, his wife Carolyn, and their three sons live in Delaware County, Pennsylvania, – in Chadds Ford as of 2017 and formerly Drexel Hill.

Legal offices
| Preceded by Michael R. Stiles | United States Attorney for the Eastern District of Pennsylvania; 2001–2008 | Succeeded by Laurie Magid; Acting |
U.S. House of Representatives
| Preceded by Joe Sestak | Member of the U.S. House of Representatives from Pennsylvania's 7th congressional district 2011–2018 | Succeeded by Mary Gay Scanlon |
U.S. order of precedence (ceremonial)
| Preceded by Jason Altmire as Former U.S. Representative | Order of precedence of the United States as Former U.S. Representative | Succeeded by Keith Rothfus as Former U.S. Representative |
