= Protecting and Securing Chemicals Facilities from Terrorist Attacks Act of 2014 =

United States bill

Chemical Facility Anti-Terrorism Standards Program Authorization and Accountability Act of 2014
- Long title: To recodify and reauthorize the Chemical Facility Anti-Terrorism Standards Program.
- Announced in: the 113th United States Congress
- Sponsored by: Rep. Patrick Meehan (R, PA-7)
- Number of co-sponsors: 5

Codification
- U.S.C. sections affected: 42 U.S.C. § 300f, 46 U.S.C. § 70119, 6 U.S.C. § 121, 33 U.S.C. § 12920, 46 U.S.C. § 70103, and others.
- Agencies affected: Government Accountability Office, Dwight D. Eisenhower Memorial Commission, United States Congress, United States Department of Energy, Nuclear Regulatory Commission, United States Department of Defense, Department of Homeland Security

Legislative history
- Introduced in the House as H.R. 4007 by Rep. Patrick Meehan (R, PA-7) on February 6, 2014; Committee consideration by United States House Committee on Homeland Security, United States House Committee on Energy and Commerce, United States House Homeland Security Subcommittee on Cybersecurity, Infrastructure Protection, and Security Technologies, United States House Energy Subcommittee on Environment and Economy; Passed the House on July 8, 2014 (voice vote); Passed the Senate on December 10, 2014 with amendment; House agreed to Senate amendment on December 11, 2014 (voice vote); Signed into law by President Barack Obama on December 18, 2014

The Chemical Facility Anti-Terrorism Standards Program Authorization and Accountability Act of 2014 (H.R. 4007) is a bill that proposed making permanent the United States Department of Homeland Security’s (DHS’s) authority to regulate security at certain chemical facilities in the United States. Under the Chemical Facility Anti-Terrorism Standards (CFATS) program, DHS collects and reviews information from chemical facilities in the United States to determine which facilities present security risks and then requires them to write and enact security plans.

The bill was introduced into the United States House of Representatives during the 113th United States Congress, and passed on July 8, 2014. An amended version of the bill passed the Senate on December 10 and was sent back to the House, which voted to pass on December 11. The bill was signed into law on December 18, 2014 as the Protecting and Securing Chemicals Facilities from Terrorist Attacks Act of 2014 by President Barack Obama.

== Background ==
The Chemical Facility Anti-Terrorism Standards (CFATS), also known as 6 CFR, Part 27, are a set of US government security regulations for high-risk chemical facilities such as chemical plants, electrical generating facilities, refineries, and universities. The US Department of Homeland Security promulgated the Final Rule on April 9, 2007. The regulations came into effect on June 8, 2007, apart from material covered in Appendix A, which took effect upon its publication in the Federal Register on November 20, 2007.

The response from the US chemical community to the initial legislation was rather critical, but the revisions introduced in November appear to have addressed many of the concerns of both industry and academia. For example, certain routine chemicals of low toxicity, such as acetone or urea, have been removed from the list, since record-keeping for such common compounds was considered an excessive burden.

== Provisions of the bill ==
This summary is based largely on the summary provided by the Congressional Research Service, a public domain source.

The Chemical Facility Anti-Terrorism Standards Program Authorization and Accountability Act of 2014 would reestablish the Chemical Facility Anti-Terrorism Standards (CFATS) Program, under which the United States Secretary of Homeland Security (DHS) is required to: (1) establish risk-based performance standards designed to protect covered chemical facilities from acts of terrorism; (2) require such facilities to submit security vulnerability assessments and develop and implement site security plans; (3) review and approve or disapprove each such assessment and plan; (4) arrange for the audit and inspection of covered chemical facilities to determine compliance with this Act; and (5) notify, and issue an order to comply to, the owner or operator of a facility not in compliance.

The bill would authorize the Secretary to: (1) issue an order assessing a civil penalty or to cease operations if an owner or operator fails to comply; and (2) approve an alternative security program established by a private sector entity or a federal, state, or local authority that meets the requirements of this Act.

The bill would authorize a covered chemical facility, in order to satisfy the requirements of a risk-based performance standard that addresses personnel surety by identifying individuals with terrorist ties, to utilize any federal screening program that periodically vets individuals against the Terrorist Screening Database.

The bill would require the Secretary to: (1) consult with the heads of other federal agencies, states and political subdivisions, and relevant business associations to identify all chemical facilities of interest; and (2) develop a risk assessment approach and corresponding tiering methodology that incorporates all relevant elements of risk, including threat, vulnerability, and consequence. Defines "covered chemical facility" to mean a chemical facility that the Secretary designates as a facility of interest and determines presents a high level of security risk, with specified exceptions.

The bill would require: (1) information developed pursuant to this Act to be protected from public disclosure, but permits the sharing of such information with state and local government officials possessing the necessary security clearances; and (2) information submitted to or obtained by the Secretary under this Act to be treated as classified material.

The bill would set forth civil penalties for violations of orders issued under this Act.

The bill would terminate this Act two years after its enactment.

== Congressional Budget Office report ==
This summary is based largely on the summary provided by the Congressional Budget Office, as ordered reported by the House Committee on Homeland Security on April 30, 2014. This is a public domain source.

H.R. 4007 would make permanent the United States Department of Homeland Security’s (DHS’s) authority to regulate security at certain chemical facilities in the United States. Under the Chemical Facility Anti-Terrorism Standards (CFATS) program, DHS collects and reviews information from chemical facilities in the United States to determine which facilities present security risks. Facilities determined to present a high level of security risk are then required to develop a Site Security Plan (SSP). DHS in turn conducts inspections to validate the adequacy of a facility’s SSP and their compliance with it. The program is set to end on October 4, 2014.

== Procedural history ==
The Chemical Facility Anti-Terrorism Standards Program Authorization and Accountability Act of 2014 was introduced into the United States House of Representatives on February 6, 2014 by Rep. Patrick Meehan (R, PA-7). It was referred to the United States House Committee on Homeland Security, the United States House Committee on Energy and Commerce, the United States House Homeland Security Subcommittee on Cybersecurity, Infrastructure Protection, and Security Technologies, and the United States House Energy Subcommittee on Environment and Economy. The DHS National Protection and Programs Directorate's Office of Infrastructure Protection Assistant Secretary Caitlin Durkovich testified in favor of the bill before the United States House Homeland Security Subcommittee on Cybersecurity, Infrastructure Protection, and Security Technologies. On June 23, 2014, it was reported (amended) alongside House Report 113-491 part 1. On July 8, 2014, the House voted in a voice vote to pass the bill.

== Debate and discussion ==
Rep. Meehan, who introduced the bill, argued that "the fertilizer plant explosion in West, Texas less than a year ago tragically demonstrated the potential for catastrophe at one of our country's thousands of chemical facilities. The Chemical Facility Anti-Terrorism Standards program is an important part of ensuring these facilities take reasonable precautions to protect against terrorist attack."

The Department of Homeland Security (DHS) supported the bill, arguing that "CFATS is making the Nation more secure by reducing the risks associated with our Nation’s chemical infrastructure." The DHS also argued that the reauthorization was necessary because "uncertainty about the future of CFATS also has provided an incentive for potentially regulated facilities storing large quantities of dangerous chemicals to ignore their obligations under CFATS in hopes that the program will be allowed to sunset."

The Fertilizer Institute supported the bill, arguing that it would allow the DHS to "effectively establish programs and make necessary changes to existing ones without worrying about whether or not the resources to administer them will be available in the future. The legislation would allow industry to be able to plan for investments with the certainty of knowing the program will be in place."

The National Association of Chemical Distributors supported the bill, arguing that it was important to reauthorize the program for two years to avoid situations like the one resulting from the United States federal government shutdown of 2013, when the law lapsed.

== See also ==
- List of bills in the 113th United States Congress
- chemical plant
