= Michael R. Stiles =

United States Attorney for the Eastern District of Pennsylvania
- In office November 15, 1993 – March 31, 2001
- President: Bill Clinton; George W. Bush
- Preceded by: Michael Baylson
- Succeeded by: Pat Meehan

Judge of the Philadelphia Court of Common Pleas
- In office 1988 – November 14, 1993

Personal details
- Party: Democratic

Michael R. Stiles is an American attorney, judge and civic activist who served as the United States Attorney for the Eastern District of Pennsylvania from 1993 to 2001.

== Biography ==
A Philadelphia native, Stiles received an undergraduate degree from the University of Pennsylvania, then studied law at Villanova University School of Law.

After admission to the Pennsylvania bar, he worked as a prosecutor in Philadelphia for twelve years, under Philadelphia District Attorneys Arlen Spector, F. Emmett Fitzpatrick and Edward Rendell, rising to become the First Assistant in 1982 and 1983. Stiles then won election and re-election to the Court of Common Pleas, where he handled jury as well as bench trials, and from 1998 until his appointment as U.S. Attorney handled exclusively homicide cases, as well as assigned homicide cases to other capable jurists as the Homicide Calendar Judge.

In April 2001 he accepted a position as Vice President for Administration and Operations with the Philadelphia Phillies, rising to the title of Executive Vice President before retiring in January 2017. Stiles oversaw the team's rebuilding and move to Citizens Bank Park in 2005. In 2008 the team won the World Series, which some considered overcoming the Curse of Billy Penn for Philadelphia sports teams.

Stiles is currently on the board of the Committee of Seventy, an independent, nonpartisan organization dedicated to civic improvement and election integrity in Philadelphia.
