= United States House Oversight Subcommittee on Technology, Information Policy, Intergovernmental Relations and Procurement Reform =

The Subcommittee on Technology, Information Policy, Intergovernmental Relations and Procurement Reform is a subcommittee within the United States House Committee on Oversight and Government Reform.

== Members, 112th Congress ==
Majority	Minority
James Lankford, Oklahoma, Chairman; Mike Kelly, Pennsylvania, Vice Chair; Jason Chaffetz, Utah; Tim Walberg, Michigan; Raul Labrador, Idaho; Pat Meehan, Pennsylvania; Blake Farenthold, Texas	Gerry Connolly, Virginia, Ranking Member; Chris Murphy, Connecticut; Stephen Lynch, Massachusetts
Ex officio
Darrell Issa, California	Elijah Cummings, Maryland
