= United States border preclearance =

U.S. border security procedures

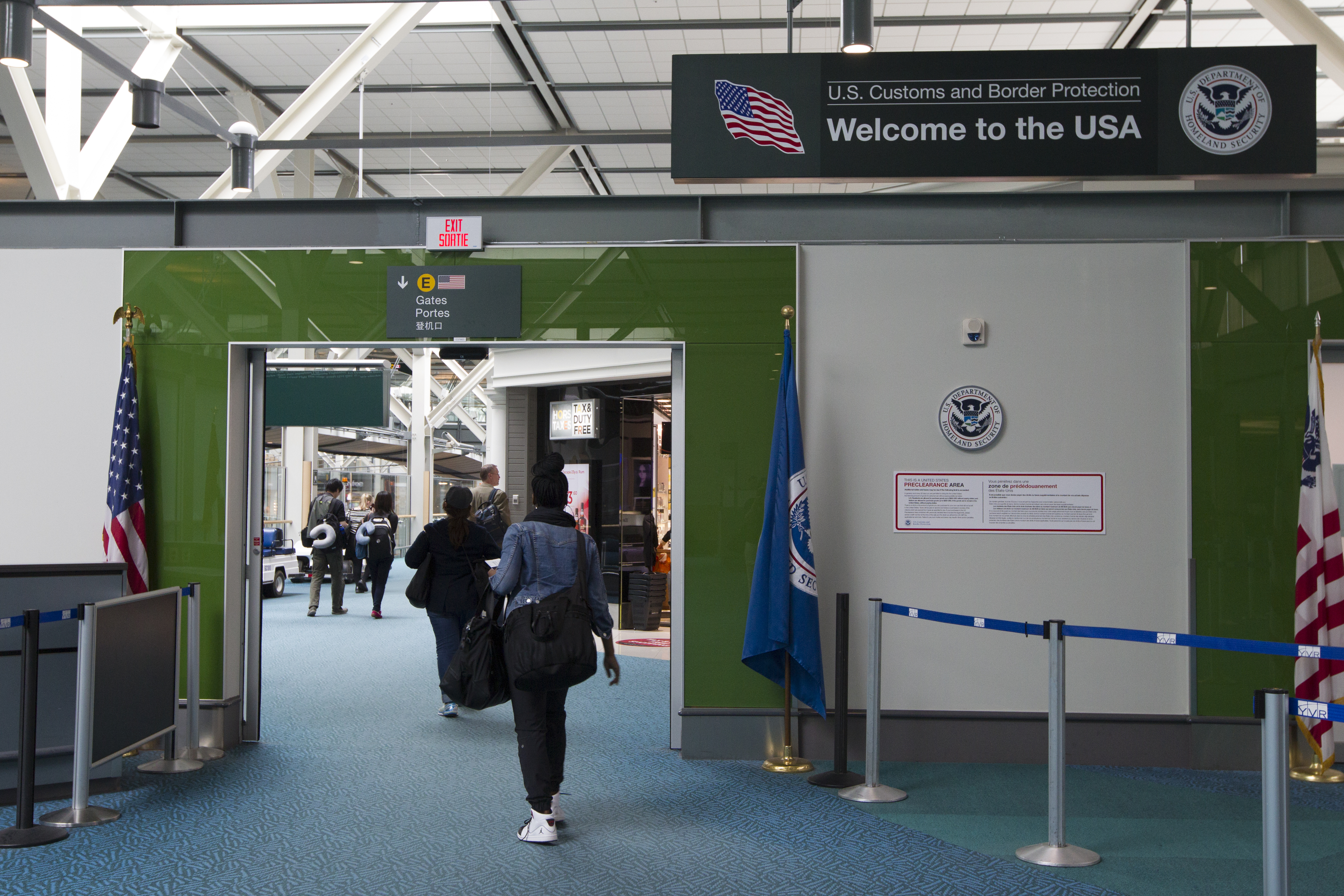
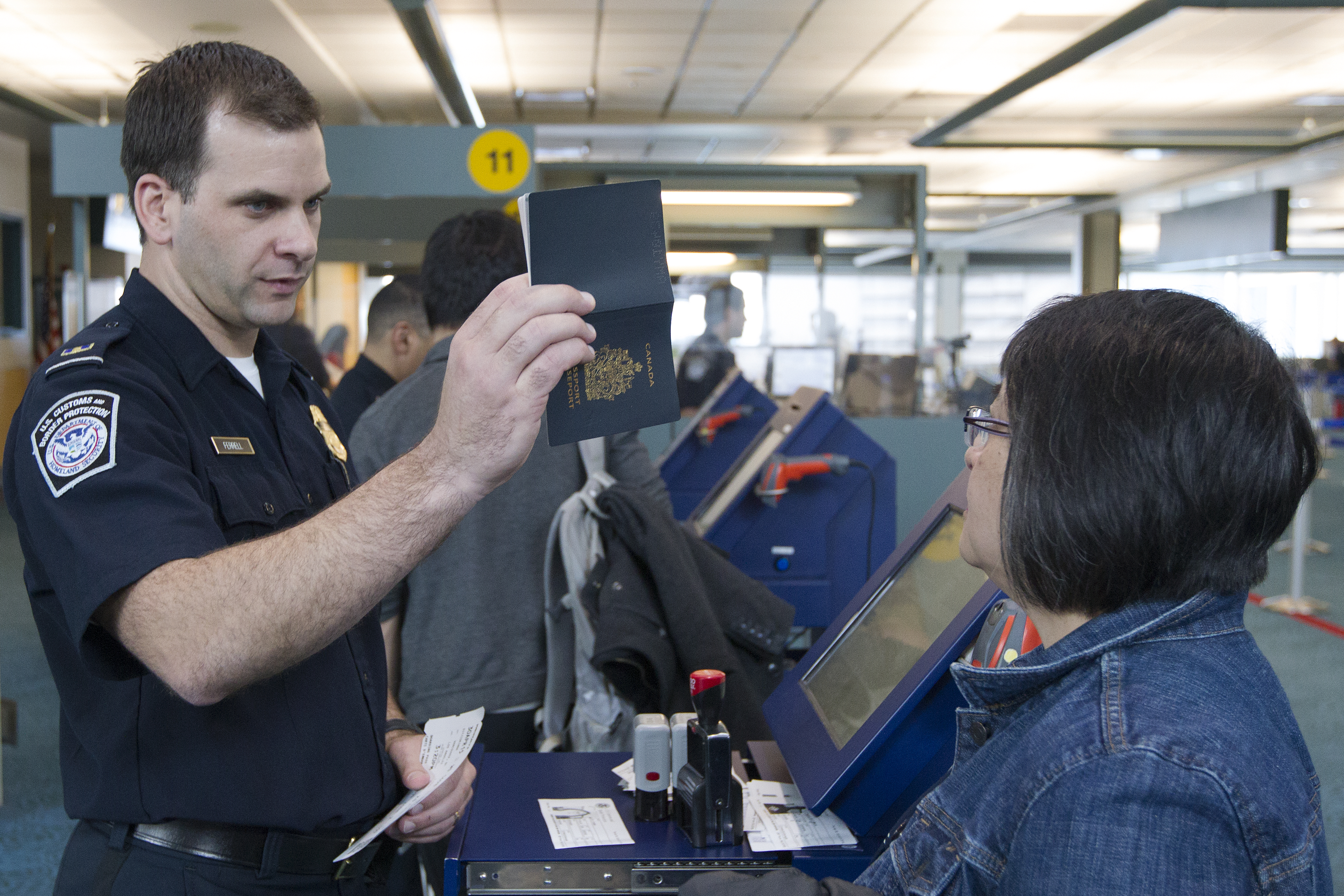
United States Customs and Border Protection officers prescreening passengers at Vancouver International Airport in Vancouver

United States border preclearance is a method of prescreening border control operated by the United States Department of Homeland Security to screen individuals seeking entry to the United States in eligible facilities located outside of the United States pursuant to agreements between the United States and host countries. Individuals are subject to immigration and customs inspections by U.S. Customs and Border Protection (CBP) officers before boarding their method of transportation onward to the United States. Preclearance applies to all individuals regardless of their nationality or purpose of travel. Upon arrival, precleared passengers arrive in the United States as domestic travelers; however, they may still be subject to re-inspection at the discretion of CBP. This process is intended to streamline border procedures, reduce congestion at American ports of entry, and facilitate travel into airports that otherwise lack immigration and customs processing facilities for commercial flights.

The practice of prescreening U.S.-bound passengers in foreign countries began in 1894 when American immigration inspectors were deployed to sea ports across Canada. Modern preclearance facilities were first introduced in 1952 at Toronto Pearson International Airport and Calgary International Airport under an informal arrangement with the Government of Canada and are now available at eight major Canadian International airports and one seaport, while several other seaports and one rail station in British Columbia have "pre-inspection" facilities for screening immigration admissibility only.

United States border preclearance facilities are present in Aruba, the Bahamas, Canada, Bermuda, Ireland, and the United Arab Emirates.

== Implementation ==
The preclearance program aims to streamline border procedures for flights entering the United States, reduce congestion at ports of entry, and to facilitate travel into U.S. airports that may not be equipped to otherwise handle international travelers. Although more U.S. airports have expanded or introduced customs facilities since the preclearance program began, LaGuardia Airport and Ronald Reagan Washington National Airport remain the two largest U.S. airports without customs facilities for processing commercial flights.

The United States border preclearance programs have been accused of deterring the arrival of potential asylum seekers, who are otherwise protected under the 1951 Refugee Convention's provisions on non-refoulement once they arrive at their destination.

== Facilities ==
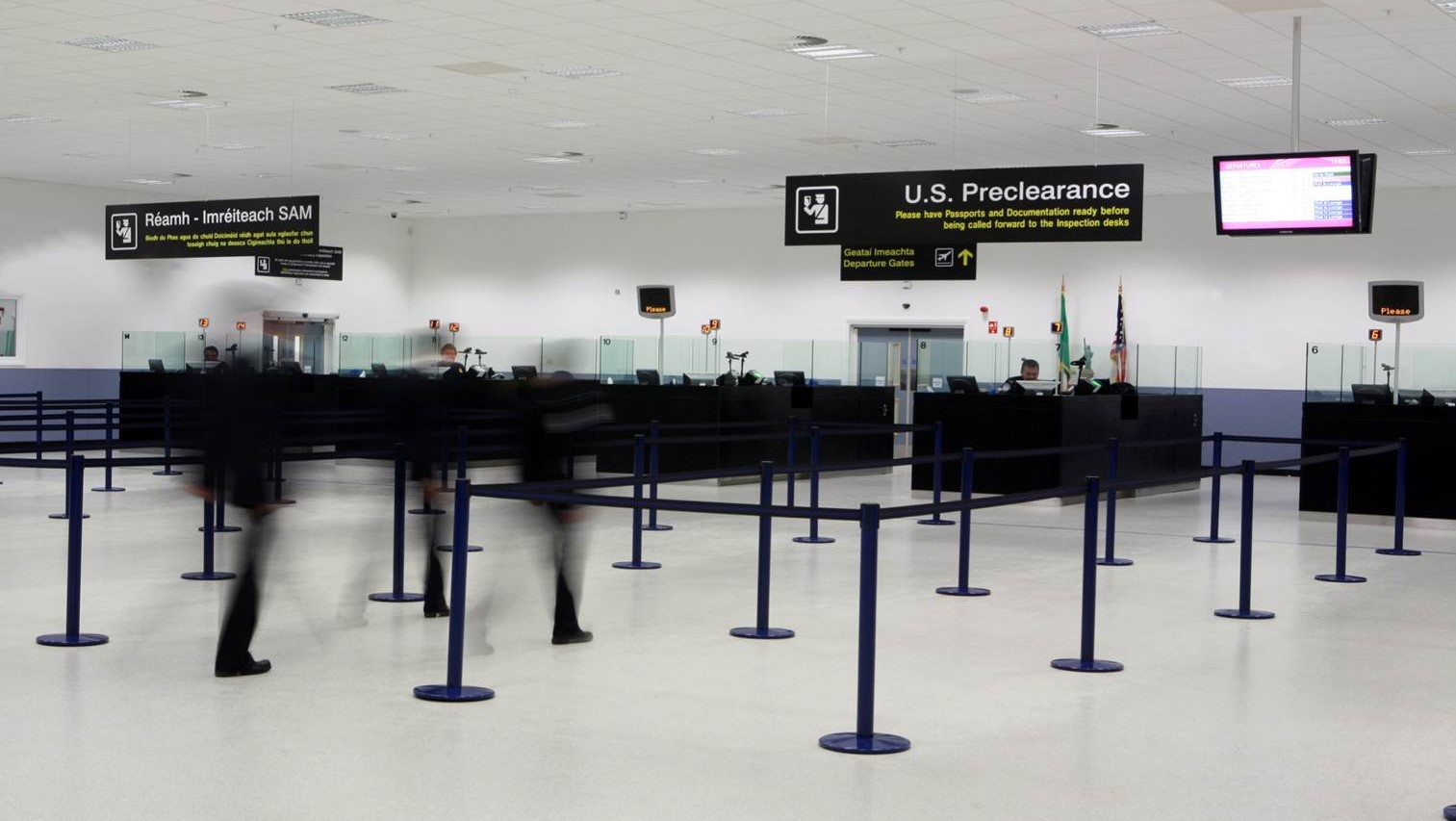
U.S. Preclearance facility at Shannon Airport, Ireland

After the requisite legal agreements have been executed, a foreign airport implementing preclearance for the first time must undergo significant remodeling or must build an entirely new facility to support the process. The foreign airport is responsible for providing CBP with a suitable inspection facility based upon the agency's detailed design guidelines. CBP preclearance facilities are smaller than their domestic counterparts on the basis that departing passengers typically enter airports at slower and more constant rates, in contrast to arriving passengers who emerge from newly landed aircraft by the hundreds all at once.

Preclearance requires considerable resources and a great deal of redundancy from the foreign airports which choose to implement it. Once precleared by CBP officers, U.S.-bound passengers must undergo security screening in accordance with U.S. standards and are then kept in a separate sterile waiting area equipped with its own shops, restaurants, lounges, restrooms, and other passenger services, as well as its own gates exclusively devoted to U.S.-bound aircraft. The foreign airport is responsible for providing all of this, meaning that the airport must already have significant U.S. air traffic to justify the expense (or anticipates development of such traffic in the near future). The only cost that is typically shared between CBP and the host airport is the cost of CBP personnel who are deployed abroad to staff preclearance facilities.

== Benefits and drawbacks ==
=== Benefits ===
U.S. preclearance offers advantages for passengers traveling to the United States, particularly those with onward connections. Because immigration and customs procedures are completed before departure, passengers arriving in the United States utilize domestic U.S. terminals for their connecting flights, eliminating the risk of lengthy border processing delays, which can cause them to miss their connections. Passengers who have been precleared and are transferring to another flight benefit from having their checked baggage sent directly to their final destination. Upon arrival in the United States, they disembark into the post-security domestic area of the airport, similar to domestic passengers, and can proceed directly to their next departure gate.

Preclearance also enables U.S. Customs and Border Protection officers to identify inadmissible passengers and prohibited goods before travel to the United States begins. This reduces the need to manage such cases on U.S. soil and lowers the risk of potential incidents. A foreign national who is refused entry at a preclearance facility is not permitted to board the U.S.-bound flight, eliminating the need for deportation arrangements after arrival.

Preclearance further provides operational flexibility for airlines. Carriers operating from airports with preclearance facilities, such as Toronto or Nassau, are able to route flights to U.S. airports that lack customs and border inspection facilities, including LaGuardia Airport and Ronald Reagan Washington National Airport. This allows airlines to reserve landing slots at larger international gateways such as John F. Kennedy International Airport and Newark Liberty International Airport for flights arriving from overseas airports without preclearance services.

=== Drawbacks ===
Despite its advantages, preclearance also has several limitations. Passengers who are unfamiliar with the process may not arrive early enough at the departure airport, and long queues or delays at preclearance facilities can result in missed outbound flights to the United States and any onward connections.

Wait times at busy facilities, particularly at Toronto Pearson International Airport, which is the busiest preclearance location, can sometimes exceed the time required to process passengers arriving on non-precleared international flights at their destination airports. These delays can also disrupt airline departure schedules. Airport authorities have attributed some of these issues to reduced staffing levels at CBP, while requests for additional staffing have often been deferred due to domestic priorities. Programs such as NEXUS and Global Entry have been expanded in an effort to reduce waiting times and restore some of the convenience originally intended by the preclearance system.

Another limitation is that CBP determines the operating hours of preclearance facilities, which are often shorter than the operating hours of the airports, seaports, or railway stations in which they are located. Transportation operators that wish to use preclearance must schedule their departures during the hours when the facilities are open. Flights departing outside those hours may still travel to the United States, but passengers on such flights must undergo the standard immigration and customs inspection procedures upon arrival in the United States.

== Legal restrictions ==
Contrary to a common misconception, preclearance facilities and the officers who work in them do not operate under the same legal framework as diplomatic missions or embassies, and they do not possess diplomatic immunity. U.S. Customs and Border Protection officers stationed at preclearance locations remain subject to the laws of the host country. In Canada, for example, the legal status of U.S. officers is governed by the Preclearance Act, 2016 and the related implementation of Bill C-23. Under this framework, U.S. officers are granted a form of functional or “blanket” immunity for actions carried out in the course of their official duties. However, this immunity does not extend to serious criminal offences. In addition, in certain integrated border enforcement situations U.S. officers are required to operate under the direction and control of Canadian law enforcement authorities. While officers must comply with Canadian law, the immunity granted for acts or omissions performed in the line of duty has been criticized by some observers as making accountability difficult in practice.

Preclearance facilities operate under agreements between the federal government of the United States and the governments of the countries where the facilities are located. Travelers who have completed preclearance but whose aircraft or vessel has not yet departed remain under the legal jurisdiction of the host country. U.S. officials may question and search travelers with their consent, but their authority to arrest or detain individuals is limited. For instance, in Ireland a preclearance officer may detain a person whom they reasonably suspect of carrying a weapon and may search that individual, or may detain someone whom they reasonably suspect of having committed an indictable offence under Irish law or of obstructing a preclearance officer in the performance of their duties. Any individual detained in such circumstances must be promptly transferred to the Garda Síochána to be dealt with in accordance with Irish law.

Some countries have enacted legislation that specifically addresses matters relating to preclearance. If a U.S. Customs and Border Protection officer identifies a security concern that is not related to immigration or customs matters, the issue may need to be referred to local authorities. Travelers also have the option to abandon their journey and decline a search. Unlike within the United States, officers generally cannot conduct searches without consent unless there is an immediate threat. Most preclearance facilities display notices informing passengers of these conditions. CBP officers assigned to the Preclearance Division are typically not armed while operating on foreign soil. However, after the Parliament of Canada approved Bill C-23, CBP officers working in Canada may carry sidearms while on duty if they are operating in environments where Canada Border Services Agency officers are normally armed.

== Canada ==
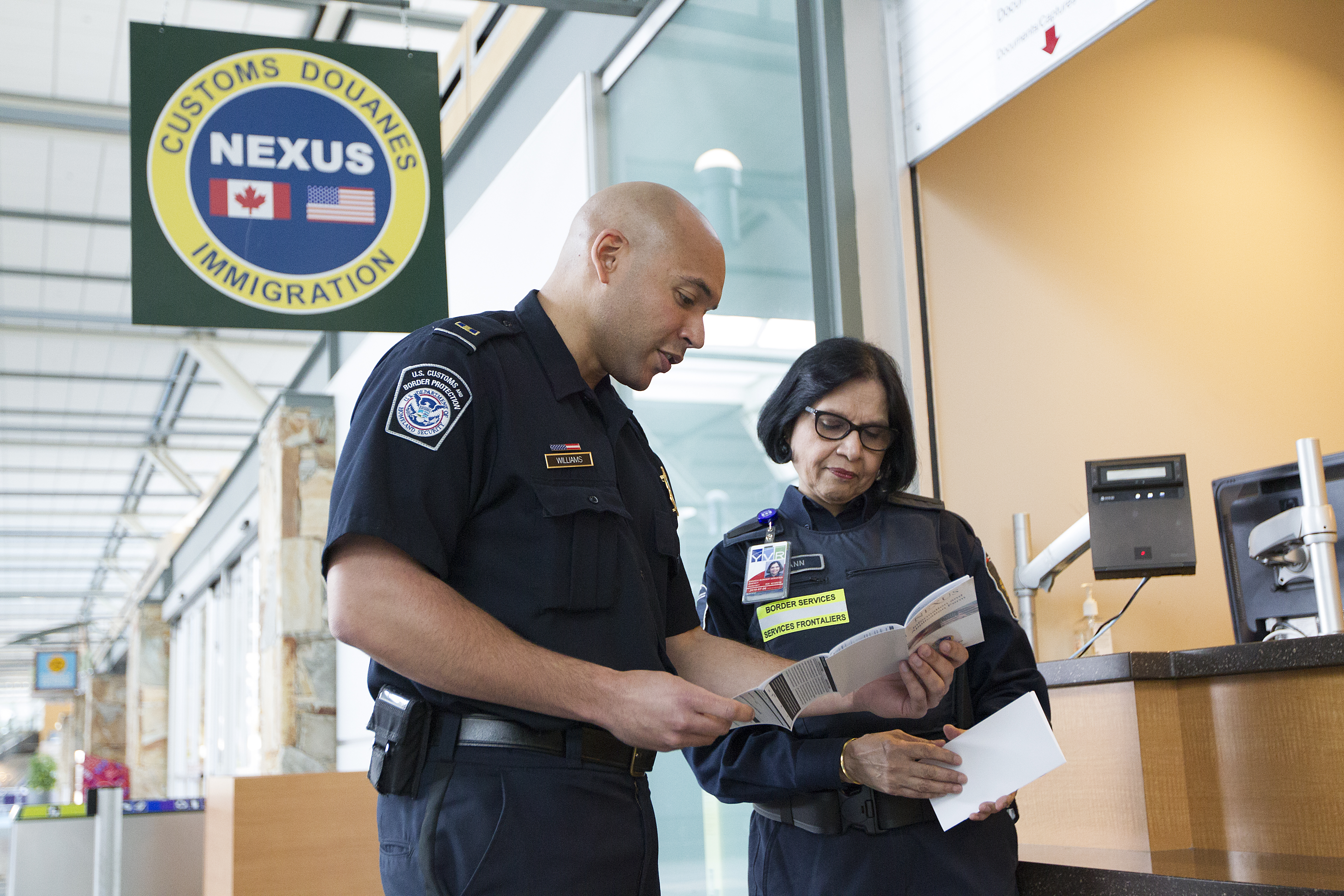
U.S Customs and Border Protection and Canada Border Services Agency work together for border crossing efficiency in Vancouver

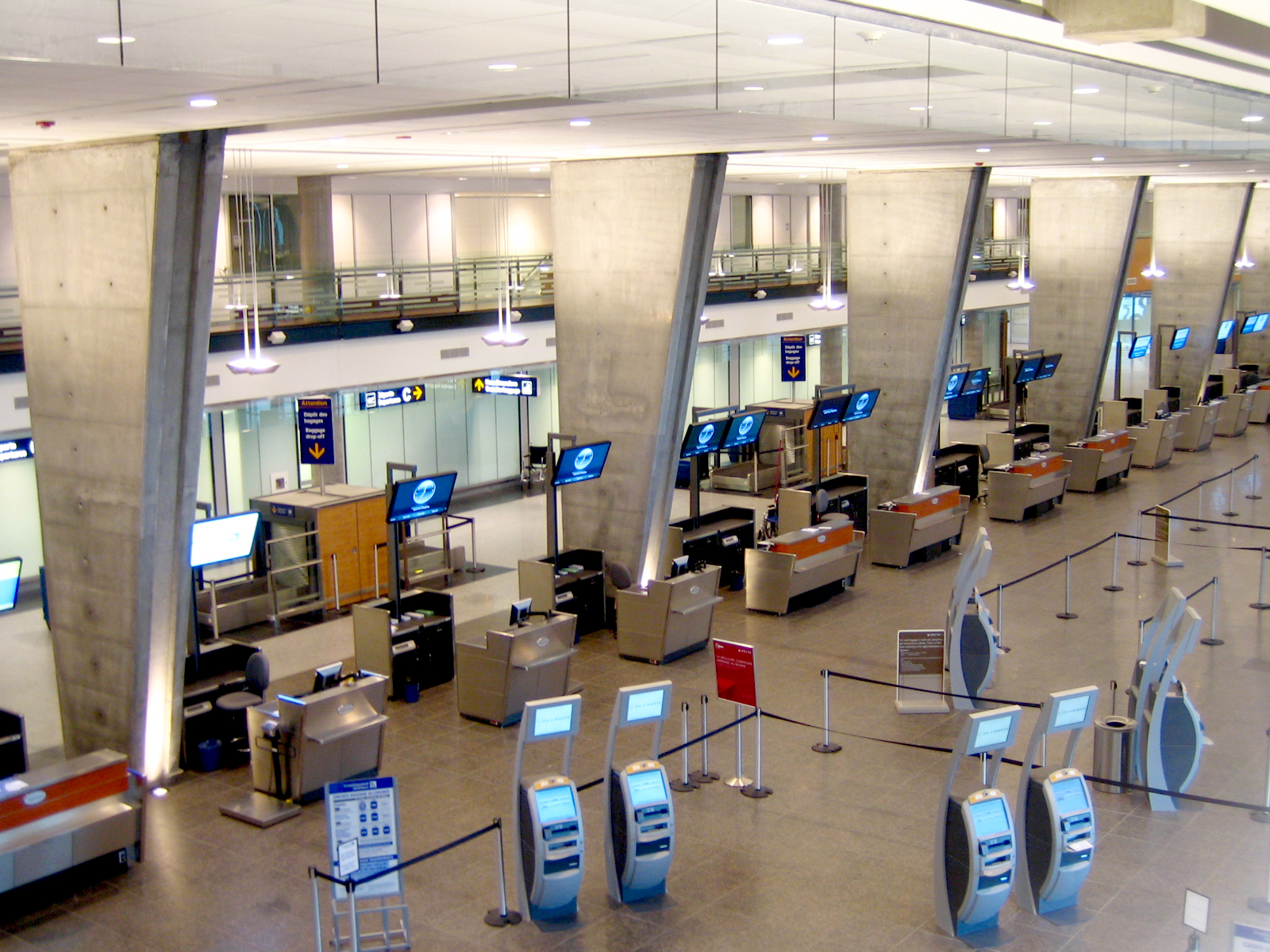
The interior of the U.S. Departures wing at Montreal-Trudeau International Airport in 2009.

=== History ===
The precursor of U.S. preclearance operation began in 1894, when the U.S. government entered into agreements with Canadian steamship and railroad operators to place U.S. immigration inspectors at the four largest Canadian seaports of Montreal, Quebec City, Halifax, Nova Scotia and Saint John, New Brunswick, to inspect prospective immigrants seeking to enter the U.S. via the northern land border. Prior to this arrangement, immigrants entering via the northern border were usually uninspected and their arrivals were not recorded, as the United States did not have immigration inspection stations on its northern border at the time. After the arrangement came into force, prospective immigrants would first pass Canadian quarantine and then be inspected by U.S. immigration inspectors as if they were entering via a U.S. port of entry. Once admitted, they would be given documentation to physically cross the land border by train within 30 days without additional inspection. In 1903, the arrangement, now formally named "pre-inspection" by the U.S. Bureau of Immigration, was extended to Victoria, British Columbia for U.S.-bound travelers before boarding their ship to destinations in Washington state. "Pre-inspection" posts in Eastern Canada lasted until the mid-20th century, with the last passenger manifest concluded in 1954, while Victoria's "pre-inspection" location remains in operation.

The modern form of air preclearance began as an informal agreement between the two countries at Malton Airport (now Toronto Pearson International Airport) and Calgary International Airport in 1952, following a request from American Airlines. Over 250,000 passengers were processed in the first year, and another preclearance facility began operation at Dorval Airport (now Montreal-Trudeau International Airport) in 1957. By 1970, the three ports of entry were processing over 3 million passengers annually. To meet growing demands, preclearance was extended to Vancouver and Winnipeg international airports in 1979, Edmonton International Airport in 1982, Ottawa Macdonald-Cartier International Airport in 1997, and Halifax Stanfield International Airport in 2006.

In 1974, preclearance operations became formalized under domestic Canadian law with the passage of the Air Transport Preclearance Act. The arrangement was repeatedly modernized with the 1999 Preclearance Act, and with the 2001 Canada–U.S. Agreement on Air Transport Preclearance. In 2019, previous agreements and legislations were replaced by the Agreement on Land, Rail, Marine, and Air Transport Preclearance Between the Government of the United States of America and the Government of Canada (LRMA), which allows for significant expansion of the scope of preclearance facilities.

On March 16, 2015, U.S. and Canadian officials signed the ministerial-level LRMA. The agreement paved paths for the expansion of CBP's preclearance facilities as well as its detention powers on Canadian soil to the levels similar on U.S. soil. For instance, under the LRMA, CBP officers working at preclearance facilities in Canada will be able to carry firearms and detain travelers who try to voluntarily withdraw their outbound travel or willingly leave the preclearance area. Although CBP does not have arrest powers in Canada, the bill also includes increased cooperation with the CBSA to arrest travelers found to be breaking the law. On March 10, 2016, U.S. and Canadian officials announced that the three priority transportation hubs that would receive preclearance were Billy Bishop Toronto City Airport, Québec City Jean Lesage International Airport, and Montreal Central Station.

On December 8, 2016, U.S. President Barack Obama signed the bipartisan Promoting Travel, Commerce and National Security Act of 2016 (H.R. 6431) into law, completing the U.S. legislative prerequisites for the signing of executive agreements such as the LRMA. On December 12, 2017, Canadian Governor General Julie Payette gave royal assent to the Canadian Preclearance Act. The LRMA was signed by representatives of both countries on August 15, 2019, and replaced previous Canadian legislation. As an executive agreement, the LRMA is not a treaty and was not presented to or ratified by the US Senate.

The preclearance agreement is fully reciprocal, meaning Canada is allowed to operate preclearance facilities in the United States on the same basis as U.S. facilities in Canada, including CBSA agents' expanded powers under the LRMA. On average, however, U.S. airports offer far fewer daily flights to Canada (as a proportion of their total air traffic) compared to the reverse, making this an expensive and inefficient proposition that, as of 2022, has not been exercised by the Canadian government.

However, in January 2025, the Canadian government announced that it would be opening a CBSA preclearance facility on the U.S. side of the Cannon Corners–Covey Hill Border Crossing to screen land travelers as part of a two-year pilot project. The aging Canadian border station 200 meters north of the border will be temporarily closed, while its CBSA personnel will move into and share the newer CBP border station south of the border which was last rebuilt in 2012.

On March 10, 2026, preclearance in Billy Bishop Toronto City Airport was officially facilitated, becoming the 9th Canadian airport with a preclearance facility.

=== Air ===
The following Canadian airports operate U.S. preclearance facilities:

- Calgary International Airport
- Billy Bishop Toronto City Airport
- Edmonton International Airport
- Halifax Stanfield International Airport
- Montréal–Trudeau International Airport
- Ottawa Macdonald–Cartier International Airport
- Toronto Pearson International Airport
- Vancouver International Airport
- Winnipeg James Armstrong Richardson International Airport

In airports with preclearance, passengers must first pass airport security inspection before they can proceed to the preclearance area. Security checks are conducted by Canadian Air Transport Security Authority (CATSA) in the standards of both CATSA and U.S. Transportation Security Administration (TSA) regulations.

=== Rail ===
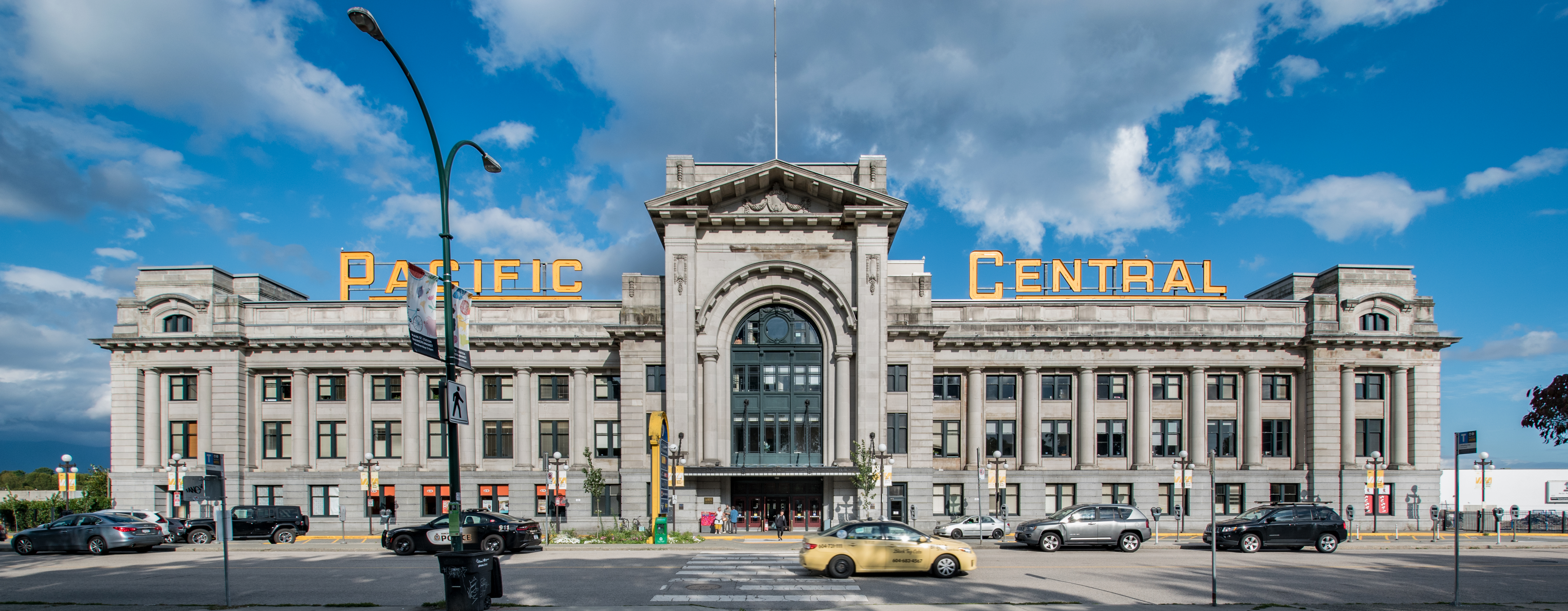
Pacific Central Station in Vancouver, British Columbia

Pacific Central Station in Vancouver, British Columbia, became the first rail preclearance facility in Canada on June 8, 2026, for Amtrak Cascades service between Canada and the United States. Prior to the start of preclearance on the route, southbound trips into the United States stopped for 15 minutes at the border crossing in Blaine, Washington.

Previously, less extensive pre-inspection procedures were conducted at Pacific Central Station since 1995, under arrangements CBP and the CBSA. These procedures addressed immigration admissibility, while customs inspections were conducted at the border crossing in Blaine, Washington. The 2019 ratification of the LRMA allowed for the development of rail preclearance, although implementation was delayed by the COVID-19 pandemic.

Montreal Central Station is being considered as a future site for a preclearance facility that would allow U.S.-bound passengers on Amtrak's Adirondack to bypass the immigration stop at Rouses Point, New York, and could enable a future extension of the Vermonter service to Montreal. U.S. lawmakers first proposed the facility in 2012. The United States and Canada signed a preclearance agreement in 2015, providing a legal framework for such facilities. In 2024, the government of Quebec completed a feasibility study for the proposed station facility. As of May 2025, implementation remains pending, with remaining steps including a cost-sharing agreement between U.S. and Canadian authorities, agreements with Montreal Central Station, and construction.

The LRMA also permits preclearance of rail cargo in both directions. A joint CBP–CBSA cargo screening pilot at Rouses Point began in 2017 and was later made permanent under the LRMA.

=== Sea ===
- Prince Rupert Alaska Marine Highway System Ferry Terminal

The Alaska Marine Highway terminal in Prince Rupert, British Columbia is the only marine preclearance location in the world. It became operational on June 20, 2022, and is used by the Alaska Marine Highway ferry service to Ketchikan.

Prior to the opening of the preclearance facilitates, "pre-inspection" facilities were available for users of the Ketchikan-Prince Rupert service until the route's suspension on October 1, 2019, after the state announced that it could not unilaterally cover the cost of security service provided by Royal Canadian Mounted Police (RCMP) to unarmed CBP officers which has become mandatory under the LRMA. However, both Canadian and Alaskan governments announced in September 2021 that they would work to upgrade Prince Rupert's facility for the port to become the first seaport preclearance location by the time of the route's resumption in mid-2022, which would alleviate the need for RCMP presence as CBP officers would be able to legally carry firearms.

Aside from the sole preclearance operation, CBP also operates "pre-inspection" at the port of Victoria, British Columbia for the Black Ball Line's MV Coho car ferry service to Port Angeles, Washington and the Victoria Clipper passenger-only ferry to Seattle; the same program operated at the terminal in Sidney, British Columbia for Washington State Ferries' Anacortes–San Juan Islands ferry service to Anacortes, Washington, suspended since 2020. Another U.S. pre-inspection post is also located at the Port of Vancouver. This post is particularly valuable to travelers on cruise liners that visit Alaska or that depart from Vancouver and have a first stop at U.S. cities along the west coast.

Similar to the operations for trains, all "pre-inspected" passengers are subject to customs inspections at U.S. ports. In 1999, U.S. Customs agents at the Port Angeles, Washington checkpoint successfully intercepted Algerian terrorist Ahmed Ressam and foiled his plot to bomb Los Angeles International Airport after Ressam had passed immigration inspection in Victoria, British Columbia.

== Caribbean and Atlantic Ocean ==
The following airports in the Caribbean and Atlantic Ocean operate U.S. preclearance facilities:

- Aruba: Queen Beatrix International Airport
- Bahamas: Lynden Pindling International Airport in Nassau
- Bermuda: L.F. Wade International Airport

In 1970, the U.S. government opened its first preclearance location outside Canada at the Civil Air Terminal on the United States Air Force's Kindley Air Force Base in the British Overseas Territory of Bermuda (the terminal had been placed there in 1948 when the previous international airport on Darrell's Island, which had served flying boats, was closed and airlines were permitted to operate landplanes to what was than the United States Army Air Forces' Kindley Field). In the same year, this base was transferred to the United States Navy as Naval Air Station Bermuda (replacing the former base of the same name, which became the Naval Air Station Bermuda Annex). In 1995, along with the Naval Facility Bermuda, they were closed as part of the post-Cold War Peace dividend (excepting the NASA tracking station on Cooper's Island, which closed a few years later and re-opened in 2013). NAS Bermuda was transferred to the Transport Ministry of the Government of Bermuda as Bermuda International Airport (subsequently politically renamed L.F. Wade International Airport). In January 1974, the facility became formalized with the conclusion of the preclearance treaty. In April of that year, the U.S. signed a similar treaty with the Bahamas, which allowed for preclearance facilities to be opened at Lynden Pindling International Airport in Nassau the same year and Grand Bahama International Airport in Freeport in 1978. In 1994, an agreement with the Aruban government was concluded, and preclearance began operation at Queen Beatrix International Airport.

The preclearance facility at Grand Bahama International Airport in Freeport was suspended due to Hurricane Matthew from October 9 to November 3, 2016. It was closed after Hurricane Dorian severely damaged the airport in September 2019, and it did not return after the airport resumed operations.

Plans were underway for a preclearance facility to be opened at Punta Cana International Airport, located in the popular tourist destination of Punta Cana, Dominican Republic, to be operating by the end of summer 2009. Further plans were made in April 2016 to open a facility the next year; but as of March 2018, the facility had not yet opened. In April 2011, a team from the U.S. Department of Homeland Security traveled to Jamaica for talks with Jamaican government and tourism officials on opening future preclearance facilities on the island.

== Ireland ==
The following Irish airports operate U.S. preclearance facilities:

- Dublin Airport
- Shannon Airport

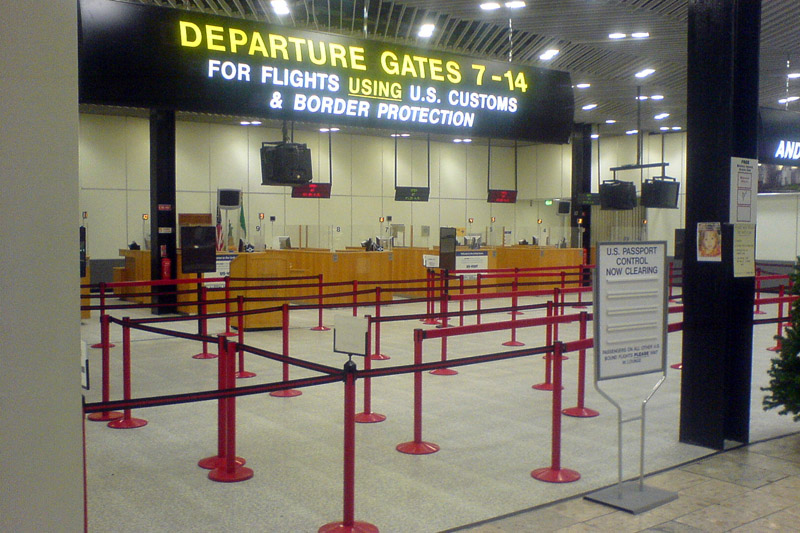
U.S. Customs and Border Protection at Shannon

The United States and Ireland entered into a preinspection arrangement in 1986 and a new preclearance treaty in 2009. The "pre-inspection" facility became operational at Shannon Airport in 1988 and at Dublin Airport in 1994.

Initially, both airports only offered "pre-inspection" immigration inspection, while customs and agriculture inspections were still done upon arrival in the United States, which required passengers to go through international arrival areas after landing. In August 2009, Shannon opened an addition to its "pre-inspection" facility to allow full preclearance inspections. In January 2011, a section of the then-recently opened Terminal 2 of Dublin Airport was opened with dedicated preclearance with full CBP facilities. Both airports now allow U.S.-bound commercial flights that use the preclearance facilities to arrive at domestic terminals instead of international terminals, which in turn allows arriving passengers to leave U.S. airports upon landing without further inspection. Since March 2010, the Shannon preclearance facility is also available for use by private aircraft. However, the Dublin facility is only available for commercial flights.

In 2017, U.S. Executive Order 13769 implemented a ban on passport-holders of seven countries, preventing traveling to the United States. In response, the Irish government announced that there would be a "complete review" of preclearance arrangements. However, as of 2025 preclearance still operates in both Shannon and Dublin airports.

In line with Irish law, USCBP officers in Ireland are not permitted to carry weapons.

== United Arab Emirates ==
In December 2011, the government of Abu Dhabi signed a letter of intent to construct a terminal that, when opened, would house a U.S. border preclearance facility.

Several U.S. lawmakers opposed the Abu Dhabi preclearance facility because only state-owned Etihad Airways flies from Abu Dhabi to U.S. destinations. On June 6, 2013, the U.S. House passed an amendment offered by Representatives Pat Meehan (R-PA), Candice Miller (R-MI) and Peter DeFazio (D-OR), which prohibits the U.S. Department of Homeland Security (DHS) from using any taxpayer dollars to conduct Customs and Border Protection (CBP) preclearance operations at Abu Dhabi International Airport. The amendment was unanimously adopted during floor consideration of the FY14 Homeland Security Appropriations bill. On November 14, 2013, Rep. Patrick Meehan (R, PA-7) introduced the Preclearance Authorization Act of 2014 (H.R. 3488; 113th Congress). Meehan indicated that the goal of the bill would be to prevent CBP from opening a preclearance facility at Abu Dhabi International Airport in the United Arab Emirates. Supporters of the bill wished to avoid giving Etihad an unfair competitive advantage created by the fact that travelers flying through Abu Dhabi (on Etihad) would be able to use preclearance, while passengers on other airlines would not. This bill did not become law.

The preclearance facility at Abu Dhabi International Airport was officially opened on January 26, 2014.

== List ==
Each preclearance port has a distinct, three-letter port of entry code. The list of codes is maintained by CBP and may be different from the IATA and ICAO airport codes of each airport. These CBP codes can be commonly found on passport entry stamps or parole stamps.

Country/region	City	Port of entry	CBP	IATA	ICAO	Notes
Aruba	Oranjestad	Queen Beatrix International Airport	ARU	AUA	TNCA	The IATA code ARU is used by Araçatuba Airport in Brazil
Bahamas	Nassau	Lynden Pindling International Airport	NAS	NAS	MYNN	
Bermuda	Hamilton	L.F. Wade International Airport	HAM	BDA	TXKF	The IATA code HAM is used by Hamburg Airport in Germany
Canada	Calgary	Calgary International Airport	CLG	YYC	CYYC	The IATA code CLG is used by New Coalinga Municipal Airport in the USA
Canada	Edmonton	Edmonton International Airport	EDA	YEG	CYEG	The IATA code EDA is used by Edna Bay Seaplane Base in the USA
Canada	Halifax	Halifax Stanfield International Airport	HAL	YHZ	CYHZ	The IATA code HAL is used by Halali Airport in Namibia
Canada	Montreal	Montréal–Trudeau International Airport	MON	YUL	CYUL	The IATA code MON is used by Mount Cook Aerodrome in New Zealand
Canada	Ottawa	Ottawa Macdonald–Cartier International Airport	OTT	YOW	CYOW	The IATA code OTT is used by Andre Maggi Airport in Brazil
Canada	Prince Rupert	Prince Rupert Alaska Marine Highway Ferry Terminal	PRC	N/A	N/A	The IATA code PRC is used by Ernest A. Love Field in the USA
Canada	Toronto	Billy Bishop Toronto City Airport	TOR	YTZ	CYTZ	The IATA code TOR is used by Torrington Municipal Airport in the USA
Canada	Toronto	Toronto Pearson International Airport	TOR	YYZ	CYYZ	The IATA code TOR is used by Torrington Municipal Airport in the USA
Canada	Vancouver	Pacific Central Station				
Canada	Vancouver	Vancouver International Airport	VCV	YVR	CYVR	The IATA code VCV is used by the Southern California Logistics Airport in the USA
Canada	Winnipeg	Winnipeg James Armstrong Richardson International Airport	WIN	YWG	CYWG	The IATA code WIN is used by Winton Airport in Australia
Ireland	Dublin	Dublin Airport	DBL	DUB	EIDW	The IATA code DBL is unused
Ireland	Shannon	Shannon Airport	SNN	SNN	EINN	
United Arab Emirates	Abu Dhabi	Zayed International Airport	MAA	AUH	OMAA	The IATA code MAA is used by Chennai Airport in India

== Future plans ==
In May 2015, the United States Department of Homeland Security announced that the following airports will be considered for the expansion of the border preclearance scheme:

1. Brussels Airport, Belgium
2. Punta Cana Airport, Dominican Republic
3. Narita International Airport, Japan
4. Amsterdam Airport Schiphol, Netherlands
5. Oslo Airport, Norway
6. Madrid-Barajas Airport, Spain
7. Stockholm Arlanda Airport, Sweden
8. Istanbul Airport, Turkey
9. London Heathrow Airport, United Kingdom
10. Manchester Airport, United Kingdom

On November 4, 2016, Sweden and the United States signed an agreement that would make Sweden the second European country, after Ireland, to offer preclearance, although no announcement has been made as to when the service will start. On that same date, DHS also announced that eleven more airports in nine countries had been added to the list of possible preclearance airports:

1. El Dorado International Airport (BOG) in Bogota, Colombia
2. Ministro Pistarini International Airport (EZE) in Buenos Aires, Argentina
3. Edinburgh Airport (EDI) in Edinburgh, United Kingdom
4. Keflavik International Airport (KEF) in Iceland
5. Mexico City International Airport (MEX) in Mexico City, Mexico
6. Milan-Malpensa Airport (MXP) in Milan, Italy
7. Kansai International Airport (KIX) in Osaka, Japan
8. Rio de Janeiro-Galeão International Airport (GIG) in Rio de Janeiro, Brazil
9. Leonardo da Vinci-Fiumicino Airport (FCO) in Rome, Italy
10. São Paulo-Guarulhos International Airport (GRU) in São Paulo, Brazil
11. Princess Juliana International Airport (SXM) in St. Maarten.

On March 23, 2018, the Taiwanese newspaper Liberty Times reported that the U.S. had conditionally agreed to the establishment of a border preclearance system in Taiwan. The Taiwanese government is assessing the possibility of establishing a United States border preclearance system at its main airport, and according to Ministry of Foreign Affairs (MOFA) spokesman Andrew Lee, the relevant government ministries are examining the issue and discussing how such a system could be put in place at Taiwan Taoyuan International Airport.

On August 18, 2019, outgoing U.S. Ambassador to Colombia Kevin Whitaker stated that U.S. preclearance at El Dorado International Airport would be available within the next year, according to an interview with El Tiempo.

As part of the Windsor Framework and the supplemental Safeguarding the Union paper, the Government of the United Kingdom will explore talks to establish US Preclearance at Belfast International Airport. Currently, TUI Airways operates a seasonal flight from Belfast to Melbourne in Florida.

In April 2025, Saudi Arabia announced plans to establish a U.S. preclearance facility at King Abdulaziz International Airport in Jeddah, with Riyadh also being considered. The initiative is part of ongoing discussions with U.S. authorities to improve passenger processing and expand international connectivity.

== Aborted plans ==
In the early 2010s, the Ministry of Foreign Affairs of South Korea stated that the Government of South Korea plans to introduce preclearance at Incheon International Airport and Gimhae International Airport. However, on January 15, 2015, the airports announced that it would not introduce preclearance, as an in-depth analysis concluded that preclearance could lead to decreased sales at duty-free shops despite the potential income from usage fees remitted for the use of preclearance space.

After the opening of the Abu Dhabi preclearance facility in 2014, another preclearance facility was planned for Dubai International Airport, but the plan was ultimately cancelled due to the airport's open terminal design, which makes it difficult to achieve "the level of segregation" of travelers required by the U.S. government. The Al Maktoum International Airport has incorporated designs to meet U.S. preclearance standards.

On May 23, 2015, an unofficial member of the Executive Council of Hong Kong, Regina Ip, revealed in an interview that the United States and Hong Kong had explored the possibilities "some 20 or 30 years ago" to set up the preclearance arrangements at Kai Tak Airport. According to Ip, she was dispatched by the Secretary for Security, in her capacity as a career civil servant in the Security Branch, to study the arrangements in Canada, but the plan was subsequently shelved because of room constraints at Kai Tak; No analogous plans were made for the much larger Chek Lap Kok airport, which was then under construction.

On February 1, 2017, the Netherlands pulled out of talks with the United States to set up a preclearance program at Amsterdam Airport Schiphol because of U.S. President Donald Trump's Executive Order 13769, which banned travel to the United States by citizens of certain Muslim-majority countries. On 22 June 2018, the Dutch Government made it known that they were resuming plans for a pre-clearance facility at Amsterdam Airport Schiphol.

== See also ==
- Extraterritorial jurisdiction
- Immigration to the United States
- List of United States immigration legislation
- United States Department of Homeland Security
- United States Citizenship and Immigration Services
- Juxtaposed controls (a similar arrangement between Belgium, France, the Netherlands and the UK to carry out pre-embarkation immigration checks)
- Woodlands Train Checkpoint (a similar arrangement where Malaysian inbound immigration checks are carried out at the station in Singapore prior to boarding)
- Hong Kong West Kowloon railway station (a similar arrangement where mainland Chinese immigration checks are conducted at the railway station in Hong Kong)
- Padang Besar railway station (a similar arrangement where Thai immigration checks are conducted at the railway station in Malaysia)
- Shenzhen Bay Bridge (a similar arrangement where Hong Kong immigration checks are conducted on the mainland Chinese side of the border)
- Johor Bahru–Singapore Rapid Transit System (under construction; when complete will have a similar arrangement where travellers will clear both Malaysia and Singapore immigration at the point of departure)
