= Chemical Facility Anti-Terrorism Standards =

Set of US government security regulations

The Chemical Facility Anti-Terrorism Standards (CFATS), codified at 6 C.F.R. part 27, are a set of United States federal government security regulations for certain high-risk chemical facilities that possess particular chemicals, called chemicals of interest (COI) at particular concentrations. The CFATS regulations apply across a number of industries, ranging from chemical plants and chemical storage facilities to electrical generating facilities, refineries, and universities.

== Adoption ==
The U.S. Department of Homeland Security promulgated the Final Rule on April 9, 2007. The regulations came into effect on June 8, 2007, apart from material covered in Appendix A, which took effect upon its publication in the Federal Register on November 20, 2007.

The new rules apply to any "Chemical Facility," which the regulation defines as follows:

Chemical Facility or facility shall mean any establishment that possesses or plans to possess, at any relevant point in time, a quantity of a chemical substance determined by the Secretary to be potentially dangerous or that meets other risk-related criteria identified by the Department. As used herein, the term chemical facility or facility shall also refer to the owner or operator of the chemical facility. Where multiple owners and/or operators function within a common infrastructure or within a single fenced area, the Assistant Secretary may determine that such owners and/or operators constitute a single chemical facility or multiple chemical facilities depending on the circumstances.

The response from the US chemical community to the initial legislation was rather critical, but the revisions introduced in November appear to have addressed many of the concerns of both industry and academia. For example, certain routine chemicals of low toxicity, such as acetone or urea, have been removed from the list, since record-keeping for such common compounds was considered an excessive burden. However, some environmental groups believe the exemption quantities of certain substances, especially chlorine (set at 2,500 pounds (1,100 kg)), have been set too high.

== Application ==
The CFATS regulations specify over 300 chemicals of interest (COI) and "screening threshold quantities" (STQ) for each. COI are designated based on hazards associated with release (i.e., substances that are toxic, flammable, or explosive), theft or diversion, or sabotage.

== Legislation ==
On February 6, 2014, Rep. Patrick Meehan (R, PA-7) introduced into the United States House of Representatives the Chemical Facility Anti-Terrorism Standards Program Authorization and Accountability Act of 2014 (H.R. 4007; 113th Congress). The bill would make permanent the United States Department of Homeland Security’s (DHS's) authority to regulate security at certain chemical facilities in the United States. Under the Chemical Facility Anti-Terrorism Standards (CFATS) program, DHS collects and reviews information from chemical facilities in the United States to determine which facilities present security risks and then requires them to write and enact security plans. The DHS National Protection and Programs Directorate's Office of Infrastructure Protection Assistant Secretary Caitlin Durkovich testified in favor of the bill before the United States House Homeland Security Subcommittee on Cybersecurity, Infrastructure Protection, and Security Technologies. On June 23, 2014, it was reported (amended) alongside House Report 113-491 part 1. On July 8, 2014, the House voted in a voice vote to pass the bill.

On January 18, 2019, one day before the Chemical Facility Anti-Terrorism Standards Program was set to expire, President Donald Trump signed into law the Chemical Facility Anti-Terrorism Standards Program Extension Act, introduced to the House by Rep. Bennie G. Thompson (D-MS), which extended the program by 15 months.

== See also ==
- Toxic Substances Control Act (TSCA)
- Registration, Evaluation, Authorisation and Restriction of Chemicals (REACH) - EU legislation)
- Dangerous Substances Directive (67/548/EEC) - EU legislation
