= 2024 United States House of Representatives elections in Pennsylvania =

- November 5, 2024

All 17 Pennsylvania seats to the United States House of Representatives
	Majority party	Minority party
Party	Republican	Democratic
Last election	8	9
Seats won	10	7
Seat change	▲2	▼2
Popular vote	3,481,113	3,338,371
Percentage	51.05%	48.95%
Swing	▼1.40%	▲1.65%

Republican hold Republican gain
Democratic hold
Republican
50–60%
60–70%
70–80%
80–90%
Democratic
50–60%
60–70%
70–80%
80–90%
>90%

The 2024 United States House of Representatives elections in Pennsylvania were held on November 5, 2024, to elect the 17 U.S. representatives from the State of Pennsylvania, one from each of the state's congressional districts. The elections coincided with the 2024 U.S. presidential election, other elections to the House of Representatives, elections to the United States Senate, and various state and local elections. The primary elections were held on April 23, 2024.

In the general election, two districts flipped from the Democrats to the Republicans – the 7th and the 8th – while no districts flipped from the Republicans to the Democrats. As a result, Pennsylvania became the only state where the Republicans flipped more than one US House seat. (Note: Three US House seats flipped in North Carolina in 2024, but these flips were the result of a partisan gerrymander instituted in 2023, and none of the districts were seen as competitive.) These elections marked the first time since 2016 where the Republicans won a majority of the state's congressional delegation.

== District 1 ==
2024 Pennsylvania's 1st congressional district election
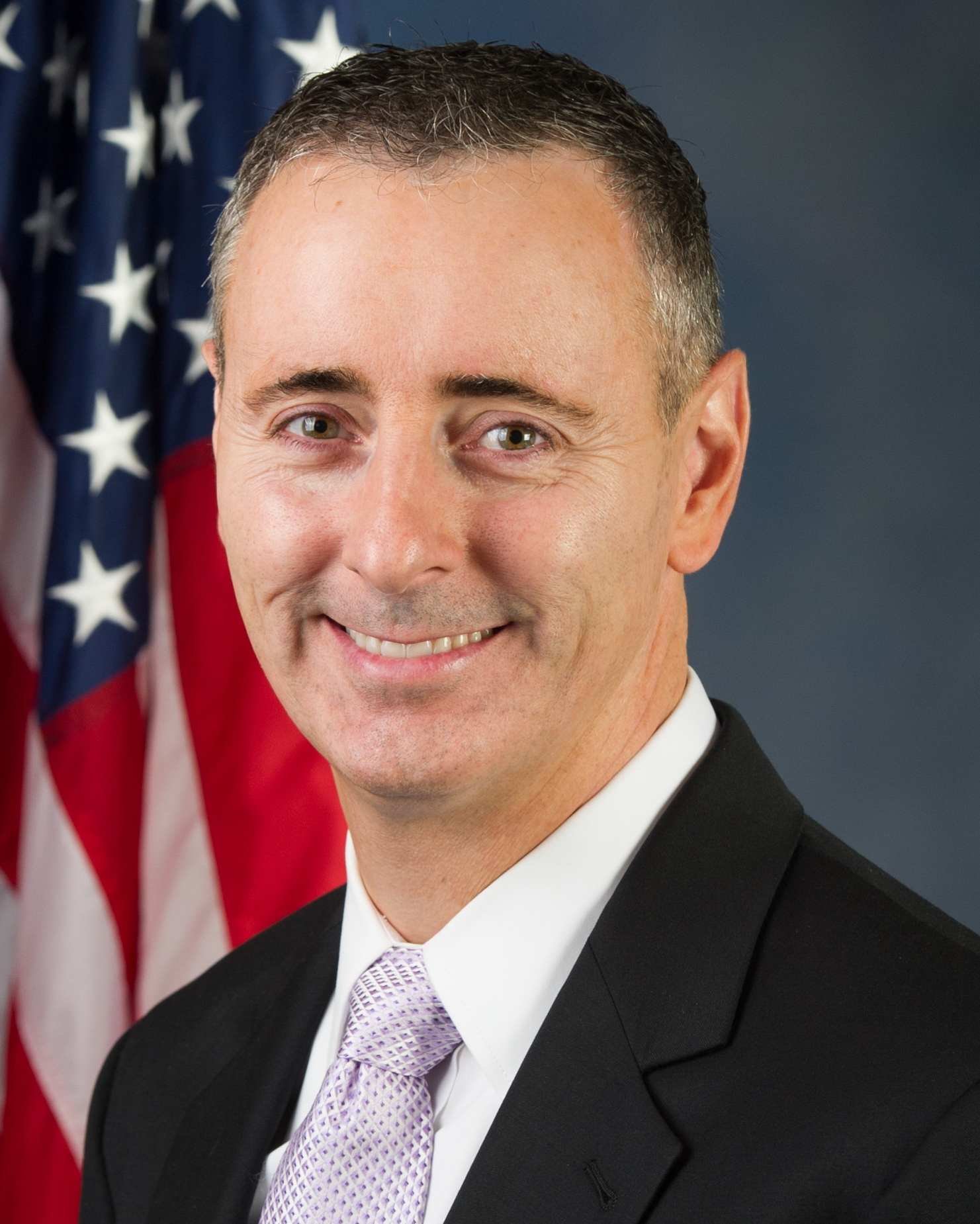

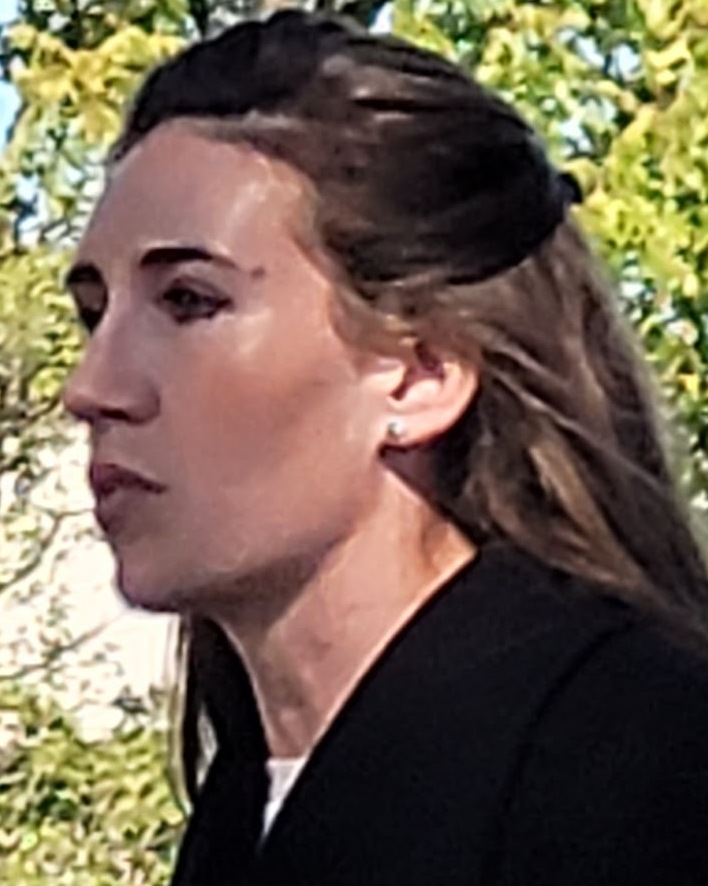
Nominee	Brian Fitzpatrick	Ashley Ehasz
Party	Republican	Democratic
Popular vote	261,390	202,042
Percentage	56.4%	43.6%
- County results Fitzpatrick: 50–60%
U.S. Representative before election
Brian Fitzpatrick
Republican
Elected U.S. Representative
Brian Fitzpatrick
Republican

The 1st district is based in the northern suburbs of Philadelphia, including all of Bucks County and parts of Montgomery County. It had an even PVI and voted for Joe Biden by 5% in 2020. The incumbent was Republican Brian Fitzpatrick, who was re-elected with 54.9% of the vote in 2022.

=== Republican primary ===
==== Nominee ====
- Brian Fitzpatrick, incumbent U.S. representative

==== Eliminated in primary ====
- Mark Houck, nonprofit ministry founder

==== Endorsements ====
Brian Fitzpatrick

U.S. senators

- Joe Manchin, West Virginia (2010–2025) (Independent; Democratic until 2024)

Organizations

- AIPAC
- Everytown for Gun Safety (post-primary)
- Humane Society Legislative Fund
- Log Cabin Republicans PAC
- Pro-Israel America
- U.S. Chamber of Commerce

Labor unions

- Association of Flight Attendants
- National Education Association

==== Fundraising ====
Campaign finance reports as of July 31, 2024
Candidate	Raised	Spent	Cash on hand
Brian Fitzpatrick (R)	$5,037,243	$2,632,212	$3,864,945.
Mark Houck (R)	$169,985	$173,998	$0
Source: Federal Election Commission

==== Results ====
Primary results by county: Fitzpatrick—60–70% Fitzpatrick—50–60%

Republican primary results
Party	Candidate	Votes	%
Republican	Brian Fitzpatrick (incumbent)	45,052	61.52
Republican	Mark Houck	28,180	38.48
Total votes		73,232	100.00

=== Democratic primary ===
==== Nominee ====
- Ashley Ehasz, government affairs consultant and nominee for this district in 2022

==== Endorsements ====
Ashley Ehasz

U.S. representatives

- Lois Frankel, FL-22 (2013–2017, 2023–present)

State legislators

- 1 state senator (Note: Maria Collett, SD-12 (2019–present))
- 7 state representatives (Note: Tim Brennan, HD-29 (2023–present); Melissa Cerrato, HD-151 (2023–present); Tina Davis, HD-141 (2011–present); Steve Malagari, HD-53 (2019–present); Brian Munroe, HD-144 (2023–present); Jim Prokopiak, HD-140 (2024–present); Perry Warren, HD-31 (2017–present))

Organizations

- EMILY's List
- End Citizens United
- Jewish Democratic Council of America (post-primary)
- National Women's Political Caucus
- NewDem Action Fund
- Patriotic Millionaires
- Planned Parenthood Action Fund
- Reproductive Freedom for All
- Swing Left
- Vote Common Good
- VoteVets

==== Fundraising ====
Campaign finance reports as of July 31, 2024
Candidate	Raised	Spent	Cash on hand
Ashley Ehasz (D)	$2,144,767	$819,009	$1,331,906
Source: Federal Election Commission

==== Results ====
Democratic primary results
Party	Candidate	Votes	%
Democratic	Ashley Ehasz	68,489	100.00
Total votes		68,489	100.00

=== Libertarian Party ===
==== Failed to qualify ====
- Bradley Cooper, automotive industry worker and former chair of the Pennsylvania Libertarian Party

=== General election ===
==== Predictions ====
Source	Ranking	As of
The Cook Political Report	Likely R	December 12, 2023
Inside Elections	Likely R	December 15, 2023
Sabato's Crystal Ball	Likely R	September 7, 2023
Elections Daily	Likely R	February 5, 2024
CNalysis	Very Likely R	November 16, 2023

==== Polling ====
Poll source	Date(s) administered	Sample size (Note: Key: A – all adults RV – registered voters LV – likely voters V – unclear)	Margin of error	Brian Fitzpatrick (R)	Ashley Ehasz (D)	Undecided
Upswing Research & Strategy (D) (Note: Poll sponsored by Ehasz's campaign)	September 4–10, 2024	400 (LV)	± 4.9%	50%	45%	5%
Public Opinion Strategies (R) (Note: Poll sponsored by Fitzpatrick's campaign)	September 7–9, 2024	400 (RV)	± 4.0%	54%	40%	6%
Upswing Research & Strategy (D)	June 12–16, 2024	400 (LV)	± 4.9%	47%	45%	8%
Grassroots Targeting (R)	May 14–20, 2024	1,200 (LV)	± 2.8%	51%	36%	13%

Hypothetical polling

Generic Republican vs. generic Democrat

Poll source	Date(s) administered	Sample size	Margin of error	Generic Republican	Generic Democrat	Undecided
Grassroots Targeting (R)	May 14–20, 2024	1,200 (LV)	± 2.8%	49%	44%	7%

==== Results ====
Pennsylvania's 1st congressional district, 2024
Party	Candidate	Votes	%
Republican	Brian Fitzpatrick (incumbent)	261,390	56.40
Democratic	Ashley Ehasz	202,042	43.60
Total votes		463,432	100.00
Republican hold			

==== By county ====
County	Brian Fitzpatrick Republican		Ashley Ehasz Democratic		Margin		Total votes cast
County	#	%	#	%	#	%	Total votes cast
Bucks	222,693	56.64%	170,470	43.36%	52,223	18.28%	393,163
Montgomery	38,697	55.07%	31,572	44.93%	7,125	10.14%	70,269
Totals	261,390	56.40%	202,042	43.60%	59,358	12.80%	463,432

== District 2 ==
2024 Pennsylvania's 2nd congressional district election
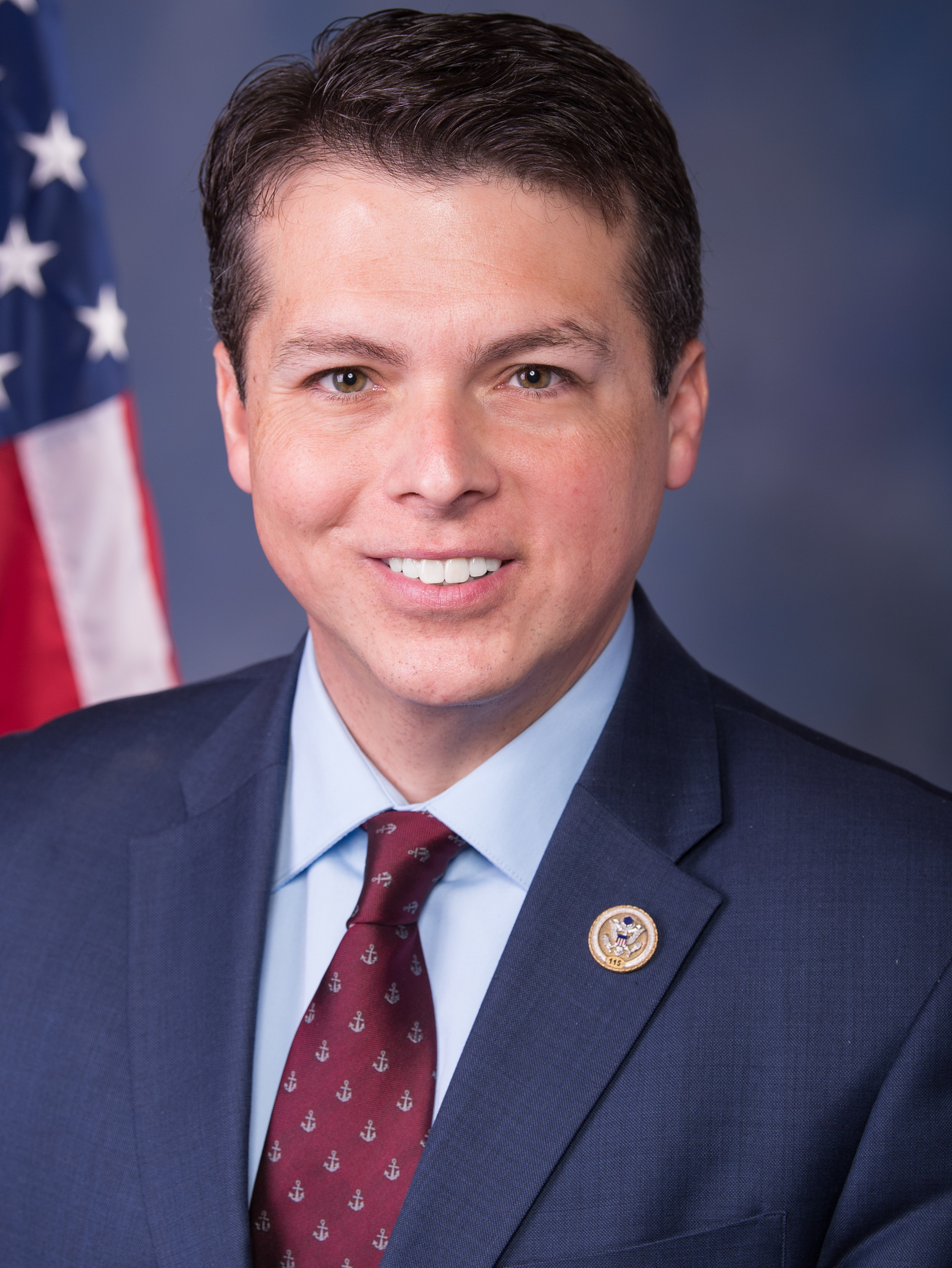

Nominee	Brendan Boyle	Haroon Bashir
Party	Democratic	Republican
Popular vote	193,691	77,355
Percentage	71.5%	28.5%
- Boyle: 50–60% 60–70% 70–80% 80–90% 90–100% Bashir: 50–60% 60–70%
U.S. Representative before election
Brendan Boyle
Democratic
Elected U.S. Representative
Brendan Boyle
Democratic

The 2nd district is based in central and northeastern Philadelphia. It had a PVI of D+20 and voted for Joe Biden by 43% in 2020. The incumbent was Democrat Brendan Boyle, who was re-elected with 75.7% of the vote in 2022.

=== Democratic primary ===
==== Nominee ====
- Brendan Boyle, incumbent U.S. representative

==== Failed to qualify for ballot access ====
- Salem Snow, social worker

==== Endorsements ====
Brendan Boyle

Organizations

- AIPAC
- Democratic Majority for Israel
- Humane Society Legislative Fund
- NextGen America PAC (post-primary)

Labor unions

- International Brotherhood of Teamsters joint council 40
- National Education Association
Salem Snow (did not qualify)

Organizations

- Vote Common Good

==== Fundraising ====
Campaign finance reports as of December 31, 2023
Candidate	Raised	Spent	Cash on hand
Brandon Boyle (D)	$1,203,945	$332,305	$3,216,580
Salem Snow (D)	$2,215	$1,163	$2,427
Source: Federal Election Commission

==== Results ====
Democratic primary results
Party	Candidate	Votes	%
Democratic	Brendan Boyle (incumbent)	43,997	100.0
Total votes		43,997	100.0

=== Republican primary ===
==== Nominee ====
- Haroon Bashir, accountant and nominee for this district in 2022

==== Results ====
Republican primary results
Party	Candidate	Votes	%
Republican	Haroon Bashir	9,748	100.0
Total votes		9,748	100.0

=== General election ===
==== Predictions ====
Source	Ranking	As of
The Cook Political Report	Solid D	December 12, 2023
Inside Elections	Solid D	December 15, 2023
Sabato's Crystal Ball	Safe D	September 7, 2023
Elections Daily	Safe D	February 5, 2024
CNalysis	Solid D	November 16, 2023

==== Results ====
Pennsylvania's 2nd congressional district, 2024
Party	Candidate	Votes	%
Democratic	Brendan Boyle (incumbent)	193,691	71.5
Republican	Haroon Bashir	77,355	28.5
Total votes		271,046	100.0
Democratic hold			

==== By county ====
County	Brendan Boyle Democratic		Haroon Bashir Republican		Margin		Total votes cast
County	#	%	#	%	#	%	Total votes cast
Philadelphia	193,691	71.46%	77,355	28.54%	116,336	42.92%	271,046
Totals	193,691	71.46%	77,355	28.54%	116,336	42.92%	271,046

== District 3 ==
2024 Pennsylvania's 3rd congressional district election
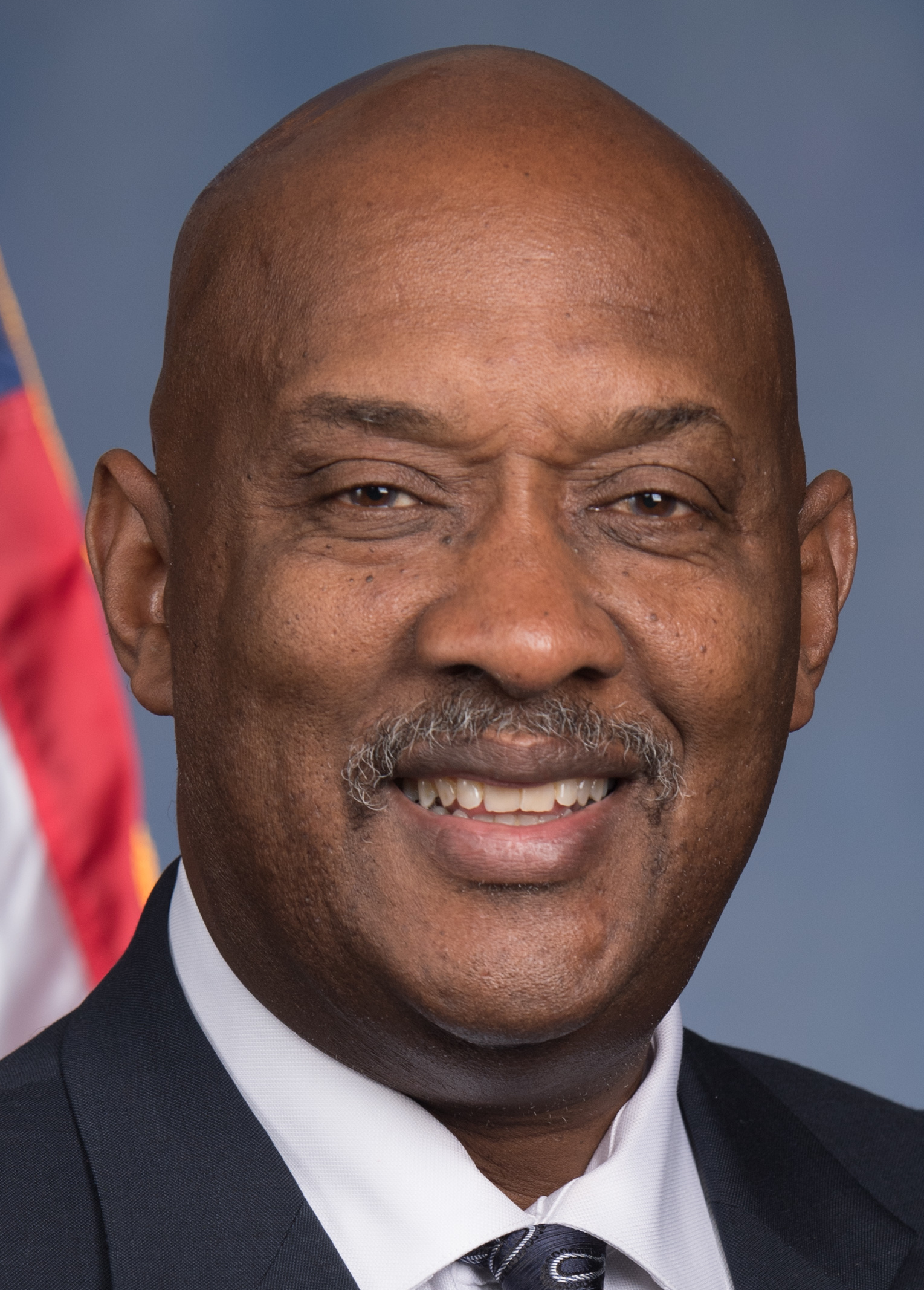
Nominee	Dwight Evans
Party	Democratic
Popular vote	340,223
Percentage	100.0%
- County results Evans: >90%
U.S. Representative before election
Dwight Evans
Democratic
Elected U.S. Representative
Dwight Evans
Democratic

The 3rd district is based in west and south Philadelphia. It had a PVI of D+40 and voted for Joe Biden by 81% in 2020. The incumbent was Democrat Dwight Evans, who was re-elected with 95.1% of the vote against a third-party candidate in 2022.

=== Democratic primary ===
==== Nominee ====
- Dwight Evans, incumbent U.S. representative

==== Eliminated in primary ====
- Tracey Gordon, former Philadelphia register of wills

==== Endorsements ====
Dwight Evans

Organizations

- Humane Society Legislative Fund
- League of Conservation Voters
- NextGen America PAC (post-primary)

Labor unions

- International Brotherhood of Teamsters joint council 40
- National Education Association
- Pennsylvania Association of Staff Nurses and Allied Professionals

Newspapers

- The Philadelphia Inquirer

==== Fundraising ====
Campaign finance reports as of December 31, 2023
Candidate	Raised	Spent	Cash on hand
Dwight Evans (D)	$551,026	$401,481	$283,160
Source: Federal Election Commission

==== Results ====
Democratic primary results
Party	Candidate	Votes	%
Democratic	Dwight Evans (incumbent)	93,974	87.7
Democratic	Tracey Gordon	13,169	12.3
Total votes		107,143	100.0

=== General election ===
==== Predictions ====
Source	Ranking	As of
The Cook Political Report	Solid D	December 12, 2023
Inside Elections	Solid D	December 15, 2023
Sabato's Crystal Ball	Safe D	September 7, 2023
Elections Daily	Safe D	February 5, 2024
CNalysis	Solid D	November 16, 2023

==== Results ====
Pennsylvania's 3rd congressional district, 2024
Party	Candidate	Votes	%
Democratic	Dwight Evans (incumbent)	340,223	100.0
Total votes		340,223	100.0
Democratic hold			

==== By county ====
County	Dwight Evans Democratic		Total votes cast
County	#	%	Total votes cast
Philadelphia	340,223	100%	340,223
Totals	340,223	100%	340,223

== District 4 ==
2024 Pennsylvania's 4th congressional district election
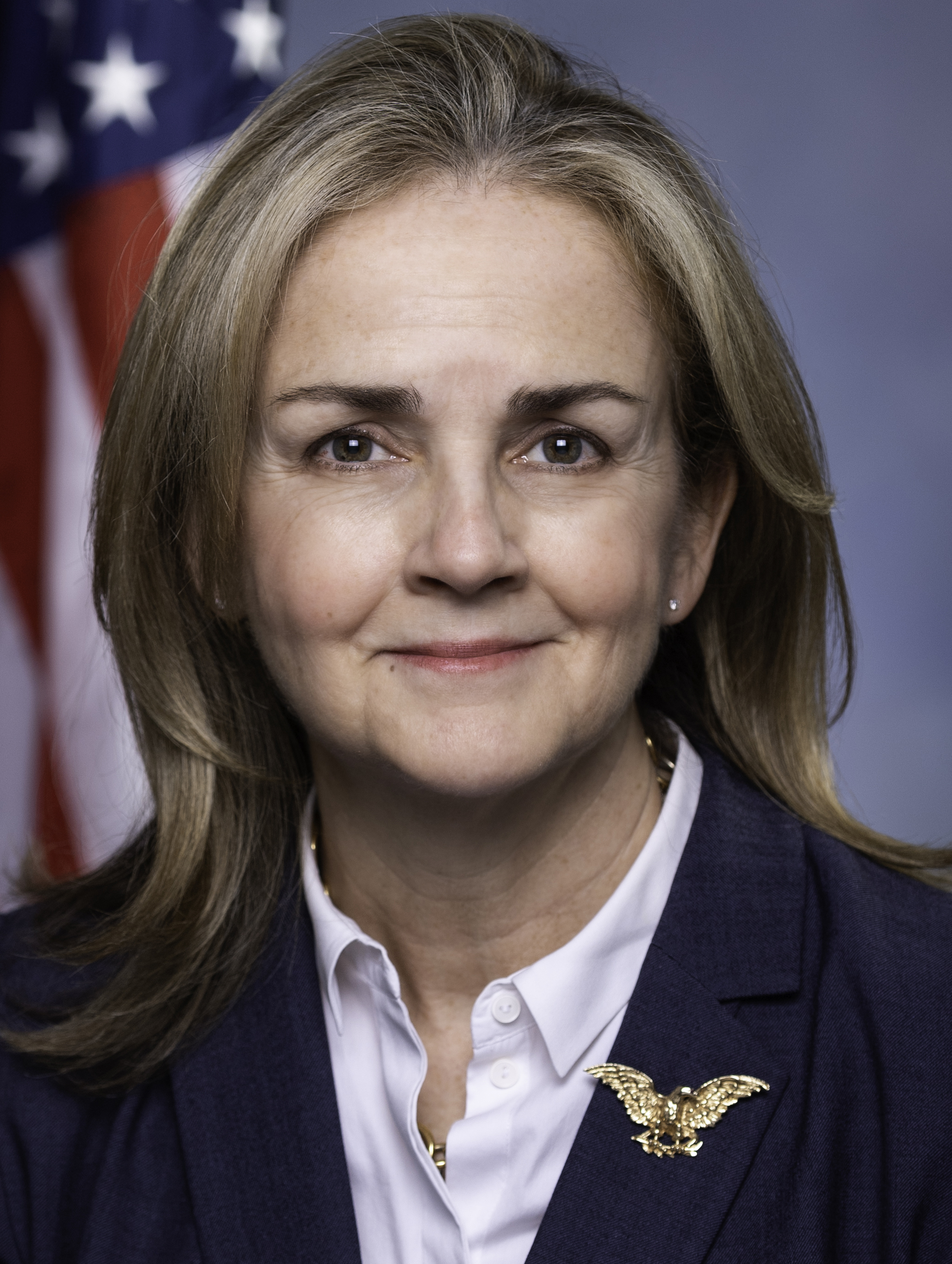

Nominee	Madeleine Dean	David Winkler
Party	Democratic	Republican
Popular vote	269,066	186,457
Percentage	59.1%	40.9%
- County results Dean: 60–70% Winkler: 50–60%
U.S. Representative before election
Madeleine Dean
Democratic
Elected U.S. Representative
Madeleine Dean
Democratic

The 4th district is based in the western suburbs of Philadelphia, including most of Montgomery County and parts of Berks County. The incumbent was Democrat Madeleine Dean, who was re-elected with 61.3% of the vote in 2022.

=== Democratic primary ===
==== Nominee ====
- Madeleine Dean, incumbent U.S. representative

==== Endorsements ====
Madeleine Dean

U.S representatives

- Gabby Giffords, AZ-08 (2007–2012)

Organizations

- Feminist Majority PAC
- Giffords
- Humane Society Legislative Fund
- Joint Action Committee for Political Affairs
- Planned Parenthood Action Fund
- Population Connection Action Fund

Labor unions

- International Brotherhood of Teamsters joint council 40
- National Education Association

==== Fundraising ====
Campaign finance reports as of December 31, 2023
Candidate	Raised	Spent	Cash on hand
Madeleine Dean (D)	$773,111	$613,820	$864,186
Source: Federal Election Commission

==== Results ====
Democratic primary results
Party	Candidate	Votes	%
Democratic	Madeleine Dean (incumbent)	78,235	100.0
Total votes		78,235	100.0

=== Republican primary ===
==== Nominee ====
- David Winkler, storage facility manager

==== Fundraising ====
Campaign finance reports as of December 31, 2023
Candidate	Raised	Spent	Cash on hand
David Winkler (R)	$17,975 (Note: $13,600 of this total was self-funded by Winkler)	$5,993	$4,750
Source: Federal Election Commission

==== Results ====
Republican primary results
Party	Candidate	Votes	%
Republican	David Winkler	43,625	100.0
Total votes		43,625	100.0

=== General election ===
==== Predictions ====
Source	Ranking	As of
The Cook Political Report	Solid D	December 12, 2023
Inside Elections	Solid D	December 15, 2023
Sabato's Crystal Ball	Safe D	September 7, 2023
Elections Daily	Safe D	February 5, 2024
CNalysis	Solid D	November 16, 2023

==== Results ====
Pennsylvania's 4th congressional district, 2024
Party	Candidate	Votes	%
Democratic	Madeleine Dean (incumbent)	269,066	59.1
Republican	David Winkler	186,457	40.9
Total votes		455,523	100.0
Democratic hold			

==== By county ====
County	Madeleine Dean Democratic		David Winkler Republican		Margin		Total votes cast
County	#	%	#	%	#	%	Total votes cast
Berks	31,346	41.72%	43,788	58.28%	−12,442	−16.56%	75,134
Montgomery	237,720	62.49%	142,669	37.51%	95,051	24.99%	380,389
Totals	269,066	59.07%	186,457	40.93%	82,609	18.13%	455,523

== District 5 ==
2024 Pennsylvania's 5th congressional district election
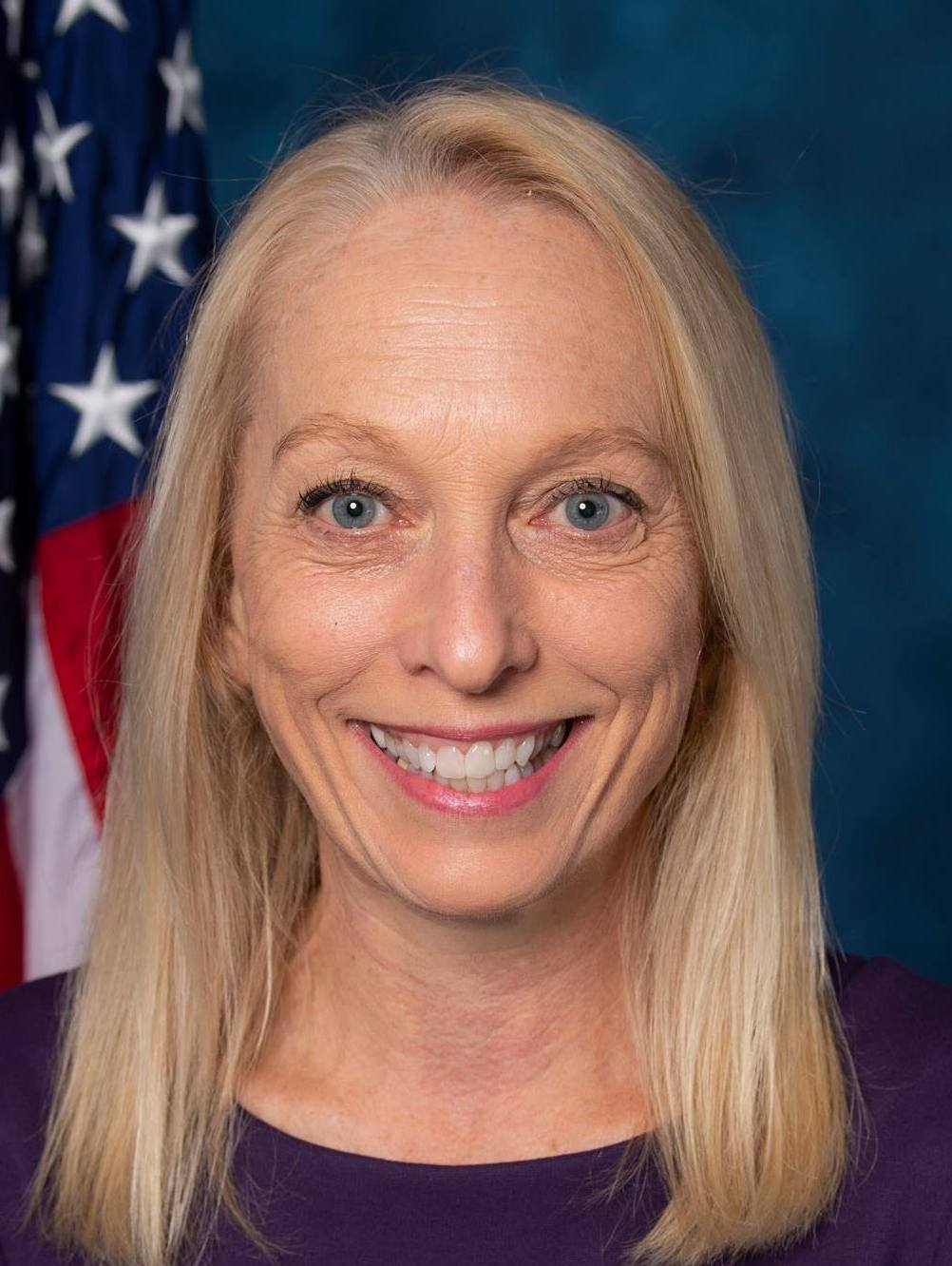

Nominee	Mary Gay Scanlon	Alfeia DeVaughn-Goodwin
Party	Democratic	Republican
Popular vote	267,754	142,355
Percentage	65.3%	34.7%
- County results Scanlon: 60–70% 70–80%
U.S. Representative before election
Mary Gay Scanlon
Democratic
Elected U.S. Representative
Mary Gay Scanlon
Democratic

The 5th district is based in the southwestern suburbs of Philadelphia, including all of Delaware County, parts of Montgomery County, and parts of south Philadelphia. The incumbent was Democrat Mary Gay Scanlon, who was re-elected with 65.1% of the vote in 2022.

=== Democratic primary ===
==== Nominee ====
- Mary Gay Scanlon, incumbent U.S. representative

==== Endorsements ====
Mary Gay Scanlon

Organizations

- Feminist Majority PAC
- Giffords
- Humane Society Legislative Fund
- Joint Action Committee for Political Affairs
- National Women's Political Caucus
- NextGen America PAC (post-primary)
- Planned Parenthood Action Fund
- Population Connection Action Fund
- Sierra Club

Labor unions

- Association of Flight Attendants
- International Brotherhood of Teamsters joint council 40
- National Education Association

==== Fundraising ====
Campaign finance reports as of December 31, 2023
Candidate	Raised	Spent	Cash on hand
Mary Gay Scanlon (D)	$638,473	$528,852	$412,202
Source: Federal Election Commission

==== Results ====
Democratic primary results
Party	Candidate	Votes	%
Democratic	Mary Gay Scanlon (incumbent)	70,068	100.0
Total votes		70,068	100.0

=== Republican primary ===
==== Nominee ====
- Alfeia DeVaughn-Goodwin, retired police officer

==== Disqualified ====
- Dasha Pruett, administrative assistant and nominee for this district in 2020

==== Results ====
Republican primary results
Party	Candidate	Votes	%
Republican	Alfeia DeVaughn-Goodwin	37,361	100.0
Total votes		37,361	100.0

=== General election ===
==== Predictions ====
Source	Ranking	As of
The Cook Political Report	Solid D	December 12, 2023
Inside Elections	Solid D	December 15, 2023
Sabato's Crystal Ball	Safe D	September 7, 2023
Elections Daily	Safe D	February 5, 2024
CNalysis	Solid D	November 16, 2023

==== Results ====
Pennsylvania's 5th congressional district, 2024
Party	Candidate	Votes	%
Democratic	Mary Gay Scanlon (incumbent)	267,754	65.3
Republican	Alfeia DeVaughn-Goodwin	142,355	34.7
Total votes		410,109	100.0
Democratic hold			

==== By county ====
County	Mary Gay Scanlon Democratic		Alfeia DeVaughn-Goodwin Republican		Margin		Total votes cast
County	#	%	#	%	#	%	Total votes cast
Chester	0	100%	0	100%	0	0%	0
Delaware	203,876	62.93%	120,100	37.07%	83,776	25.86%	323,976
Montgomery	42,178	74.17%	14,692	25.83%	27,486	48.33%	56,870
Philadelphia	21,700	74.16%	7,563	25.84%	14,137	48.31%	29,263
Totals	269,066	65.29%	142,355	34.71%	125,399	30.58%	410,109

== District 6 ==
2024 Pennsylvania's 6th congressional district election
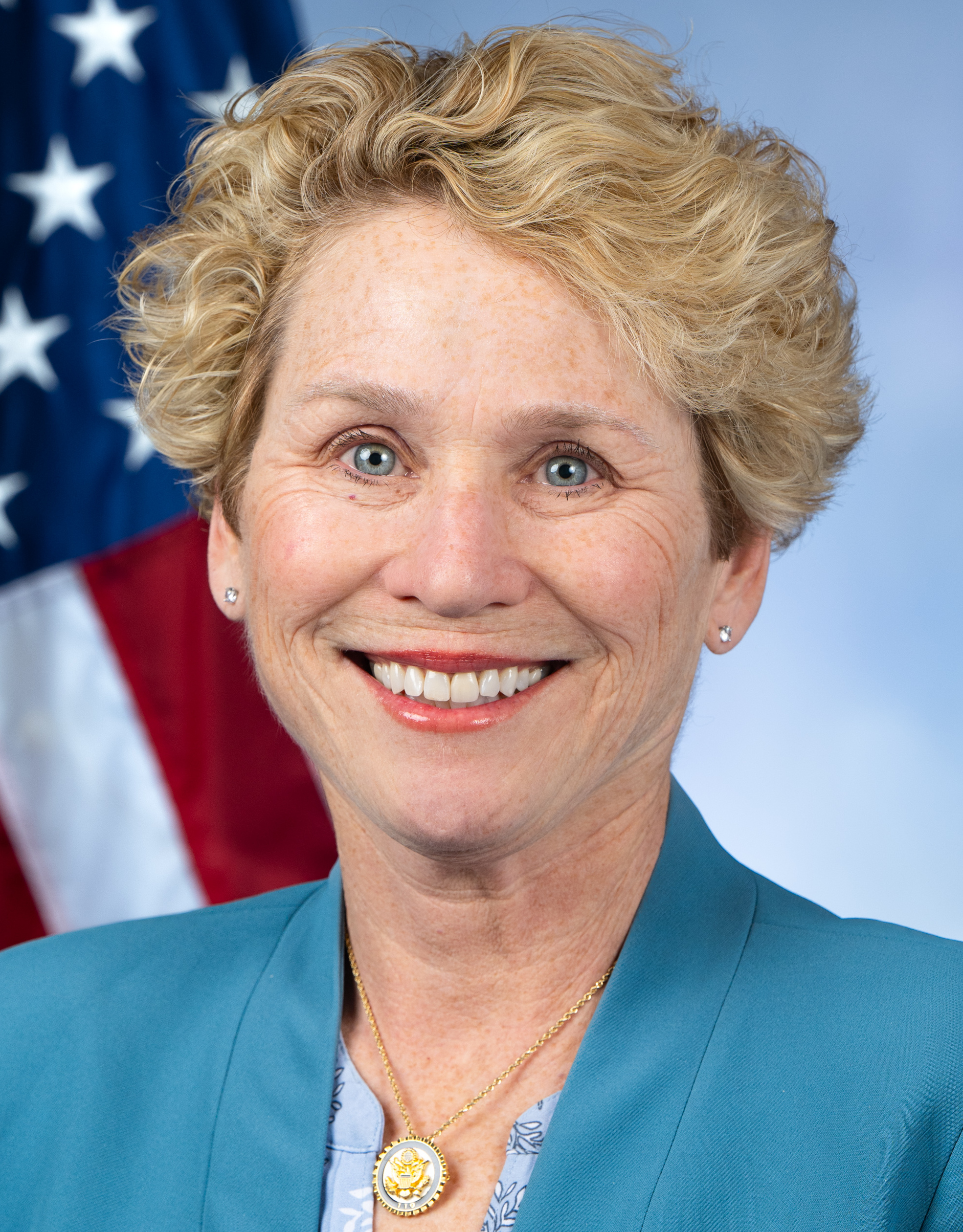

Nominee	Chrissy Houlahan	Neil Young Jr.
Party	Democratic	Republican
Popular vote	235,625	183,638
Percentage	56.2%	43.8%
- County results Houlahan: 50–60%
U.S. Representative before election
Chrissy Houlahan
Democratic
Elected U.S. Representative
Chrissy Houlahan
Democratic

The 6th district includes all of Chester County and the city of Reading in Berks County. The incumbent was Democrat Chrissy Houlahan, who was re-elected with 58.3% of the vote in 2022.

=== Democratic primary ===
==== Nominee ====
- Chrissy Houlahan, incumbent U.S. representative

==== Endorsements ====
Chrissy Houlahan

U.S representatives

- Seth Moulton, MA-06 (2015–present)

Organizations

- AIPAC
- Bend the Arc
- Democratic Majority for Israel
- Feminist Majority PAC
- Humane Society Legislative Fund
- Joint Action Committee for Political Affairs
- National Women's Political Caucus
- NextGen America PAC (post-primary)
- Population Connection Action Fund
- Sierra Club
- With Honor Fund

Labor unions

- International Brotherhood of Teamsters joint council 40
- National Education Association

==== Fundraising ====
Campaign finance reports as of December 31, 2023
Candidate	Raised	Spent	Cash on hand
Chrissy Houlahan (D)	$1,172,325	$489,737	$3,640,282
Source: Federal Election Commission

==== Results ====
Democratic primary results
Party	Candidate	Votes	%
Democratic	Chrissy Houlahan (incumbent)	58,552	100.0
Total votes		58,552	100.0

=== Republican primary ===
==== Nominee ====
- Neil Young Jr., teacher

==== Results ====
Republican primary results
Party	Candidate	Votes	%
Republican	Neil Young Jr.	45,072	100.0
Total votes		45,072	100.0

=== General election ===
==== Predictions ====
Source	Ranking	As of
The Cook Political Report	Solid D	December 12, 2023
Inside Elections	Solid D	December 15, 2023
Sabato's Crystal Ball	Safe D	September 7, 2023
Elections Daily	Safe D	February 5, 2024
CNalysis	Solid D	November 16, 2023

==== Results ====
Pennsylvania's 6th congressional district, 2024
Party	Candidate	Votes	%
Democratic	Chrissy Houlahan (incumbent)	235,625	56.2
Republican	Neil Young Jr.	183,638	43.8
Total votes		419,263	100.0
Democratic hold			

==== By county ====
County	Chrissy Houlahan Democratic		Neil Young Jr. Republican		Margin		Total votes cast
County	#	%	#	%	#	%	Total votes cast
Berks	51,469	53.65%	44,474	46.35%	6,997	7.29%	95,943
Chester	184,156	56.96%	139,164	43.04%	44,992	13.92%	323,320
Totals	235,625	56.20%	183,638	43.80%	51,987	12 40%	419,263

== District 7 ==
2024 Pennsylvania's 7th congressional district election
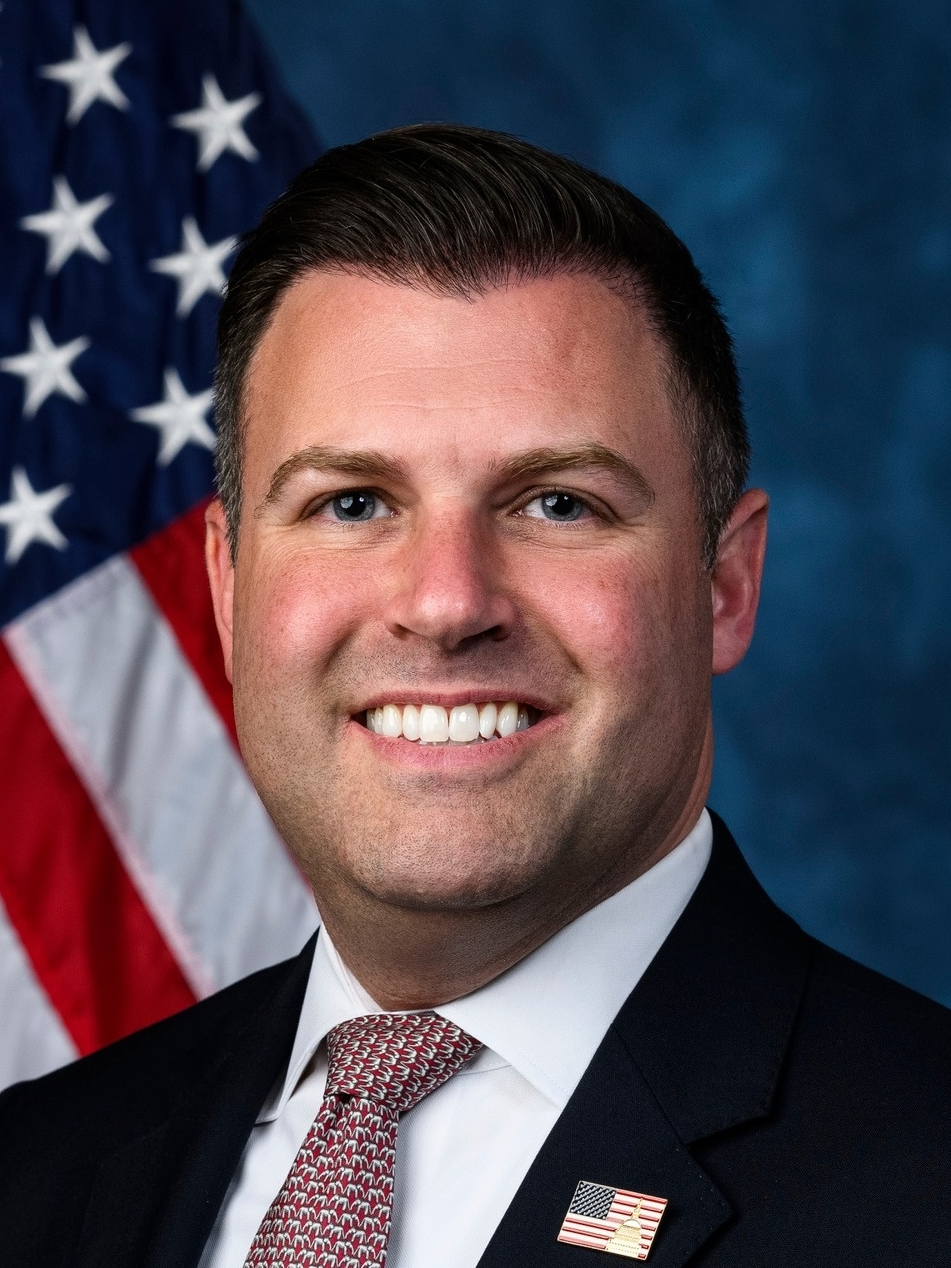

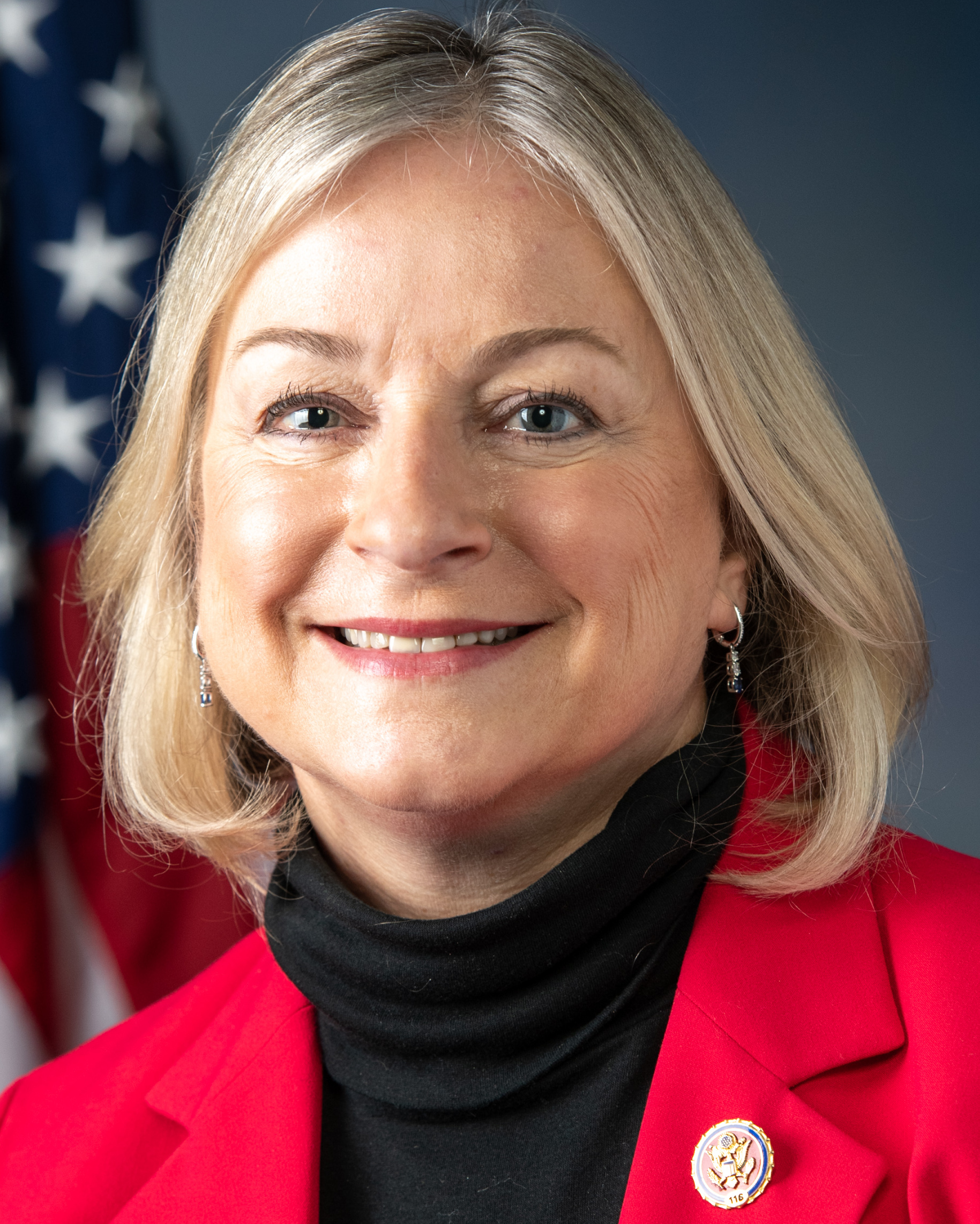
Nominee	Ryan Mackenzie	Susan Wild
Party	Republican	Democratic
Popular vote	203,688	199,626
Percentage	50.5%	49.5%
- Mackenzie: 50–60% 60–70% 70–80% Wild: 50–60% 60–70% 70–80% 80–90%
U.S. Representative before election
Susan Wild
Democratic
Elected U.S. Representative
Ryan Mackenzie
Republican

The 7th district is based in the Lehigh Valley, including all of Lehigh, Northampton, and Carbon counties and a small sliver of Monroe County. It had a PVI of R+2 and voted for Joe Biden by 0.6% in 2020. The incumbent was Democrat Susan Wild, who was re-elected with 51.0% of the vote in 2022. Wild conceded the 2024 race to Mackenzie at 10:00pm on election day, despite the race being considered "too close to call" by some media sources.

=== Democratic primary ===
==== Nominee ====
- Susan Wild, incumbent U.S. representative

==== Endorsements ====
Susan Wild

Statewide officials

- Gretchen Whitmer, governor of Michigan (2019–present)

U.S. representatives

- Liz Cheney, WY-AL (2017-2023) (post-primary; Republican)

Organizations

- AIPAC
- Brady PAC
- Council for a Livable World
- EMILY's List
- End Citizens United
- Everytown for Gun Safety Action Fund
- Feminist Majority PAC
- Giffords
- Humane Society Legislative Fund
- J Street PAC
- Jewish Democratic Council of America
- Joint Action Committee for Political Affairs
- League of Conservation Voters
- NARAL Pro-Choice America
- National Women's Political Caucus
- NextGen America PAC (post-primary)
- Natural Resources Defense Council
- Peace Action
- Planned Parenthood Action Fund
- Population Connection Action Fund

Labor unions

- Actors' Equity Association
- American Federation of State, County and Municipal Employees
- International Brotherhood of Teamsters joint council 40
- National Education Association

==== Fundraising ====
Campaign finance reports as of July 31, 2024
Candidate	Raised	Spent	Cash on hand
Susan Wild (D)	$5,065,280	$1,263,749	$3,855,492
Source: Federal Election Commission

==== Results ====
Democratic primary results
Party	Candidate	Votes	%
Democratic	Susan Wild (incumbent)	55,259	100.0
Total votes		55,259	100.0

=== Republican primary ===
==== Nominee ====
- Ryan Mackenzie, state representative from the 187th district (2012–present) and candidate for this district in 2018 and 2022

==== Eliminated in primary ====
- Kevin Dellicker, technology firm owner and candidate for this district in 2022
- Maria Montero, director of public affairs for the Pennsylvania Convention Center, former executive director of the Pennsylvania Governor's Advisory Committee for Latino Affairs, and candidate for the 12th district in the 2019 special election

==== Withdrawn ====
- Allen Issa, law student and former intern for U.S. Representative Darrell Issa (endorsed Montero)

==== Declined ====
- Lisa Scheller, former Lehigh County commissioner and nominee for this district in 2020 and 2022

==== Endorsements ====
Kevin Dellicker

U.S. representatives

- Lou Barletta, PA-11 (2011–2019)
Ryan Mackenzie

U.S. representatives

- Mike Johnson, speaker of the House (2023–present) from LA-04 (2017–present) (post-primary)

Organizations

- Americans for Prosperity
- GOPAC
- National Rifle Association Political Victory Fund
- U.S. Chamber of Commerce
Maria Montero

Individuals

- Kathy Barnette, political commentator
- Allen Issa, former candidate for this seat
- Vivek Ramaswamy, pharmaceutical executive and candidate for president in 2024

==== Debates and forums ====
2024 PA-7 Republican primary debates and forums
No.	Date	Host	Moderator	Link	Participants		
P Participant A Absent N Non-invitee I Invitee W Withdrawn							
P Participant A Absent N Non-invitee I Invitee W Withdrawn					Dellicker	Mackenzie	Montero
1	February 28, 2024	Business Matters	Tony Iannelli	Part 1 Part 2	P	P	P
2	March 4, 2024	Leighton 912 Project	Kim Bell	YouTube	P	P	P

==== Fundraising ====
Campaign finance reports as of July 31, 2024
Candidate	Raised	Spent	Cash on hand
Kevin Dellicker (R)	$524,286	$514,550	$11,248
Ryan Mackenzie (R)	$746,824	$373,568	$373,255
Maria Montero (R)	$251,490	$250,741	$748
Source: Federal Election Commission

==== Results ====
Primary results by county: Mackenzie—50–60% Mackenzie—40–50% Mackenzie—30–40%

Republican primary results
Party	Candidate	Votes	%
Republican	Ryan Mackenzie	23,557	42.6
Republican	Kevin Dellicker	18,835	34.0
Republican	Maria Montero	12,952	23.4
Total votes		55,344	100.0

=== General election ===
==== Predictions ====
Source	Ranking	As of
The Cook Political Report	Tossup	December 12, 2023
Inside Elections	Tilt D	December 15, 2023
Sabato's Crystal Ball	Lean D	October 24, 2024
Elections Daily	Lean D	November 4, 2024
CNalysis	Tilt D	August 18, 2024

==== Debates ====
2024 Pennsylvania's 7th congressional district debates
No.	Date	Host	Moderator	Link	Republican	Democratic
P Participant A Absent N Non-invitee I Invitee W Withdrawn						
P Participant A Absent N Non-invitee I Invitee W Withdrawn					Mackenzie	Wild
1	September 15, 2024	Blue Ridge Cable	Kim Bell	YouTube	P	P
2	September 16, 2024	Business Matters	Tony Iannelli	Part 1 Part 2	P	P

==== Polling ====
Poll source	Date(s) administered	Sample size	Margin of error	Susan Wild (D)	Ryan Mackenzie (R)	Undecided
Muhlenberg College (Note: Poll sponsored by The Morning Call)	September 30 – October 3, 2024	459 (LV)	± 6.0%	51%	45%	4% (Note: "Neither/Other" with 1%)
Change Research (D) (Note: Poll sponsored by Future Majority PAC)	September 16–23, 2024	592 (LV)	–	47%	43%	9%
Change Research (D)	August 10–17, 2024	406 (LV)	–	47%	43%	9%
Tarrance Group (R) (Note: Poll sponsored by the National Republican Congressional Committee and Mackenzie's campaign)	July 21–24, 2024	404 (LV)	± 4.9%	47%	45%	8%

==== Results ====
Pennsylvania's 7th congressional district, 2024
Party	Candidate	Votes	%
Republican	Ryan Mackenzie	203,688	50.5
Democratic	Susan Wild (incumbent)	199,626	49.5
Total votes		403,314	100.0
Republican gain from Democratic			

==== By county ====
County	Ryan Mackenzie Republican		Susan Wild Democratic		Margin		Total votes cast
County	#	%	#	%	#	%	Total votes cast
Carbon	22,813	66.26%	11,614	33.74%	11,199	32.53%	34,427
Lehigh	89,350	47.69%	98,017	52.31%	−8,667	−4.63%	187,367
Monroe	5,015	67.58%	2,406	32.42%	2,609	35.16%	7,421
Northampton	86,510	49.69%	87,589	50.31%	−1,079	−0.62%	174,099
Totals	203,688	50.50%	199,626	49.50%	4,062	1.01%	403,314

== District 8 ==
2024 Pennsylvania's 8th congressional district election
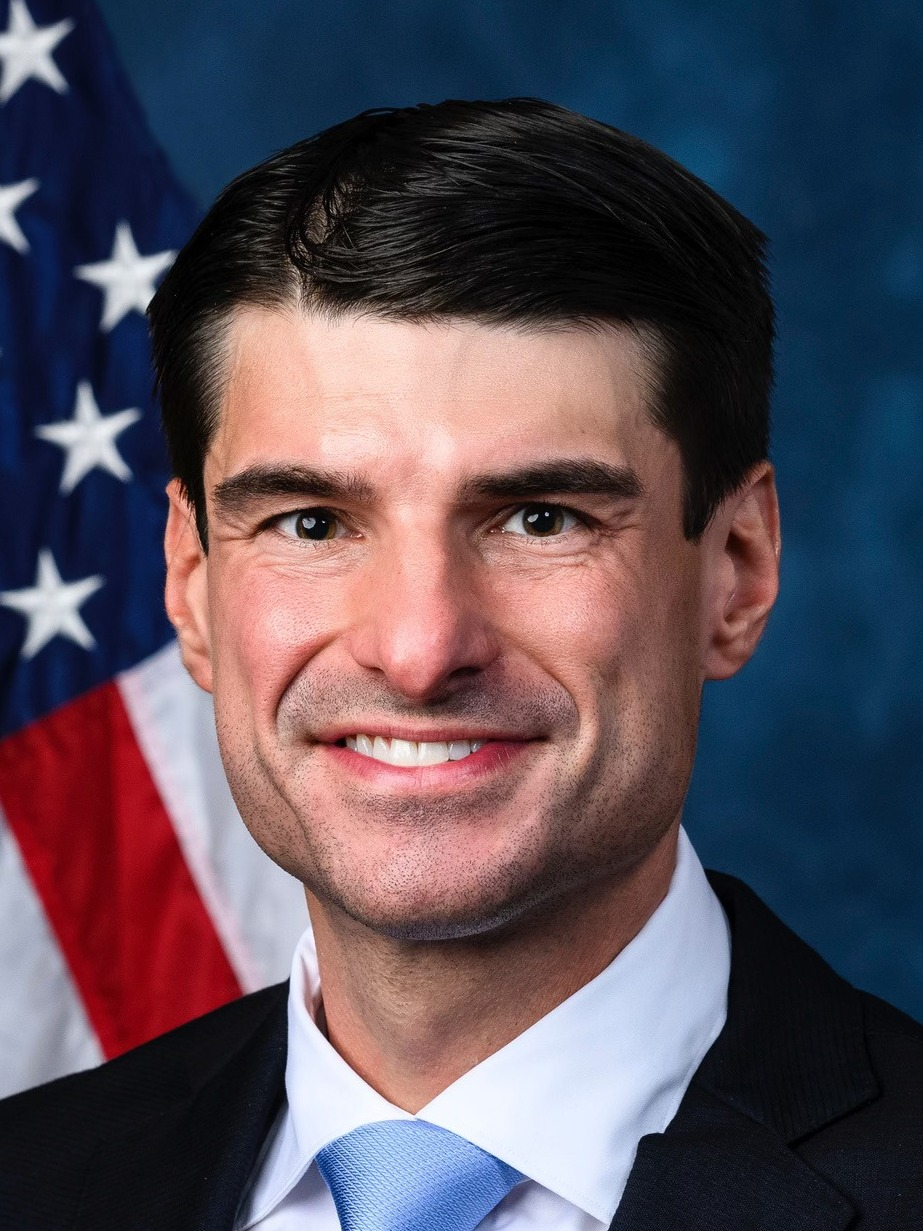

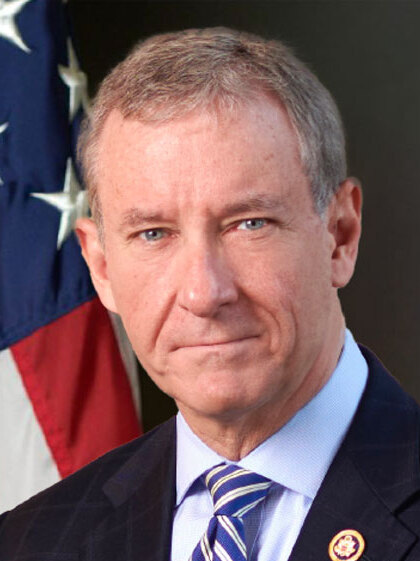
Nominee	Rob Bresnahan	Matt Cartwright
Party	Republican	Democratic
Popular vote	195,663	189,411
Percentage	50.8%	49.2%
- Bresnahan: 50–60% 60–70% 70–80% Cartwright: 50–60% 60–70% 70–80%
U.S. Representative before election
Matt Cartwright
Democratic
Elected U.S. Representative
Rob Bresnahan
Republican

The 8th district is based in Northeast Pennsylvania, specifically the Wyoming Valley and Pocono Mountains, including all of Lackawanna, Wayne, and Pike counties, and most of Luzerne and Monroe counties. It had a PVI of R+4 and voted for Donald Trump by 3% in 2020. The incumbent was Democrat Matt Cartwright, who was re-elected with 51.2% of the vote in 2022.

=== Democratic primary ===
==== Nominee ====
- Matt Cartwright, incumbent U.S. representative

==== Endorsements ====
Matt Cartwright

Organizations

- AIPAC
- Brady PAC
- Democratic Majority for Israel
- End Citizens United
- Everytown for Gun Safety (post-primary)
- Feminist Majority PAC
- Humane Society Legislative Fund
- J Street PAC
- Jewish Democratic Council of America
- League of Conservation Voters
- Natural Resources Defense Council
- NextGen America PAC (post-primary)
- Population Connection Action Fund

Labor unions

- International Brotherhood of Teamsters joint council 40
- National Education Association

==== Fundraising ====
Campaign finance reports as of July 31, 2024
Candidate	Raised	Spent	Cash on hand
Matt Cartwright (D)	$5,655,991	$1,169,837	$4,538,773
Source: Federal Election Commission

==== Results ====
Democratic primary results
Party	Candidate	Votes	%
Democratic	Matt Cartwright (incumbent)	58,573	100.0
Total votes		58,573	100.0

=== Republican primary ===
==== Nominee ====
- Rob Bresnahan Jr., construction company CEO

==== Endorsements ====
Rob Bresnahan Jr

U.S. representatives

- Mike Johnson, LA-04 (2017–present), Speaker of the House (2023–present)
- Burgess Owens, UT-04 (2021–present)
- Steve Scalise, LA-01 (2008–present), House Majority Leader (2023–present)

Organizations

- Americans for Prosperity
- Congressional Leadership Fund
- National Federation of Independent Business (post-primary)
- National Rifle Association Political Victory Fund
- Republican Jewish Coalition
- U.S. Chamber of Commerce

==== Fundraising ====
Campaign finance reports as of July 31, 2024
Candidate	Raised	Spent	Cash on hand
Rob Bresnahan (R)	$2,561,590	$1,336,326	$1,225,264
Source: Federal Election Commission

==== Results ====
Republican primary results
Party	Candidate	Votes	%
Republican	Rob Bresnahan Jr.	42,365	100.0
Total votes		42,365	100.0

=== General election ===
==== Predictions ====
Source	Ranking	As of
The Cook Political Report	Tossup	December 12, 2023
Inside Elections	Tilt D	December 15, 2023
Sabato's Crystal Ball	Lean D	November 4, 2024
Elections Daily	Lean D	November 4, 2024
CNalysis	Tilt D	November 16, 2023

2024 Pennsylvania's 8th congressional district debate
No.	Date	Host	Moderator	Link	Republican	Democratic
P Participant A Absent N Non-invitee I Invitee W Withdrawn						
P Participant A Absent N Non-invitee I Invitee W Withdrawn					Bresnahan	Cartwright
1	October 22, 2024	WVIA-TV	Tracey Matisak	C-SPAN	P	P

==== Polling ====
Poll source	Date(s) administered	Sample size	Margin of error	Matt Cartwright (D)	Rob Bresnahan Jr. (R)	Undecided
Noble Predictive Insights (Note: Poll sponsored by Inside Elections)	October 23–25, 2024	406 (LV)	± 4.9%	50%	43%	7%

Hypothetical polling

Matt Carwright vs. different candidate

Poll source	Date(s) administered	Sample size	Margin of error	Matt Cartwright (D)	Different candidate	Undecided
Cygnal (R) (Note: Poll sponsored by the Congressional Leadership Fund, which supports Republican candidates)	July 24–25, 2023	400 (LV)	± 4.9%	39%	51%	10%

Matt Cartwright vs. generic Republican

Poll source	Date(s) administered	Sample size	Margin of error	Matt Cartwright (D)	Generic Republican	Undecided
Cygnal (R)	July 24–25, 2023	400 (LV)	± 4.9%	44.6%	44.6%	10.8%

==== Results ====
Pennsylvania's 8th congressional district, 2024
Party	Candidate	Votes	%
Republican	Rob Bresnahan Jr.	195,663	50.8
Democratic	Matt Cartwright (incumbent)	189,411	49.2
Total votes		385,074	100.0
Republican gain from Democratic			

==== By county ====
County	Rob Bresnahan Jr. Republican		Matt Cartwright Democratic		Margin		Total votes cast
County	#	%	#	%	#	%	Total votes cast
Lackawanna	50,835	42.97%	64,779	56.03%	−13,944	−12.06%	115,614
Luzerne	69,827	53.86%	59,830	46.15%	9,997	7.71%	129,657
Monroe	35,013	45.95%	41,188	54.05%	−6,175	−8.10%	76,201
Pike	20,727	60.08%	13,773	39.92%	6,954	20.16%	34,500
Wayne	19,261	66.18%	9,841	33.82%	9,420	33.27%	29,102
Totals	195,663	50.81%	189,411	49.19%	6,252	1.62%	385,074

== District 9 ==
2024 Pennsylvania's 9th congressional district election
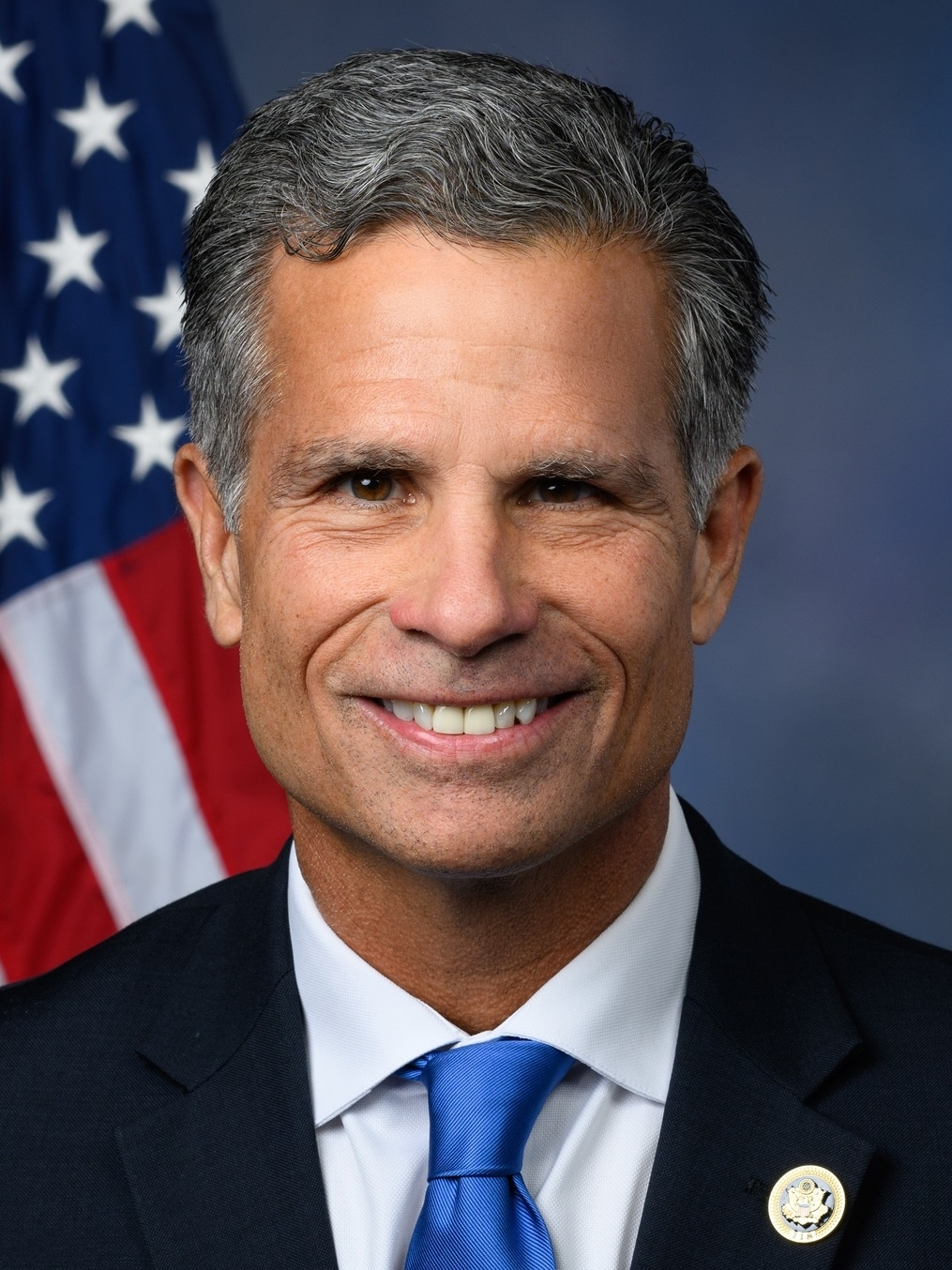

Nominee	Dan Meuser	Amanda Waldman
Party	Republican	Democratic
Popular vote	276,212	115,523
Percentage	70.5%	29.5%
- County results Meuser: 60–70% 70–80%
U.S. Representative before election
Dan Meuser
Republican
Elected U.S. Representative
Dan Meuser
Republican

The incumbent was Republican Dan Meuser, who was re-elected with 69.3% of the vote in 2022.

=== Republican primary ===
==== Nominee ====
- Dan Meuser, incumbent U.S. representative

==== Endorsements ====
Dan Meuser

Organizations

- AIPAC
- National Rifle Association Political Victory Fund

==== Fundraising ====
Campaign finance reports as of July 31, 2024
Candidate	Raised	Spent	Cash on hand
Dan Meuser (R)	$1,259,787	$1,190,016	$173,621
Source: Federal Election Commission

==== Results ====
Republican primary results
Party	Candidate	Votes	%
Republican	Dan Meuser (incumbent)	77,943	100.0
Total votes		77,943	100.0

=== Democratic primary ===
==== Nominee ====
- Amanda Waldman, Medicare financial representative and nominee for this district in 2022

==== Results ====
Democratic primary results
Party	Candidate	Votes	%
Democratic	Amanda Waldman	34,851	100.0
Total votes		34,851	100.0

=== General election ===
==== Predictions ====
Source	Ranking	As of
The Cook Political Report	Solid R	December 12, 2023
Inside Elections	Solid R	December 15, 2023
Sabato's Crystal Ball	Safe R	September 7, 2023
Elections Daily	Safe R	February 5, 2024
CNalysis	Solid R	November 16, 2023

==== Results ====
Pennsylvania's 9th congressional district, 2024
Party	Candidate	Votes	%
Republican	Dan Meuser (incumbent)	276,212	70.5
Democratic	Amanda Waldman	115,523	29.5
Total votes		391,735	100.0
Republican hold			

==== By county ====
County	Dan Meuser Republican		Amanda Waldman Democratic		Margin		Total votes cast
County	#	%	#	%	#	%	Total votes cast
Berks	21,564	69.33%	9,540	30.67%	12,024	38.66%	31,104
Bradford	23,218	75.73%	7,441	24.27%	15,777	51.46%	30,659
Columbia	21,880	68.01%	10,294	32.00%	11,586	36.01%	32,174
Lebanon	48,854	67.60%	23,416	32.40%	25,438	35.20%	72,270
Luzerne	17,636	73.20%	6,457	26.80%	11,179	46.40%	24,093
Lycoming	24,478	68.01%	11,514	31.99%	12,964	36.02%	35,992
Montour	6,379	65.07%	3,424	34.93%	2,955	30.14%	9,803
Northumberland	30,779	71.66%	12,170	28.34%	18,609	43.33%	42,949
Schuylkill	52,039	72.03%	20,206	27.97%	31,833	44.06%	72,245
Sullivan	2,714	75.12%	899	24.88%	1,815	50.24%	3,613
Susquehanna	16,262	73.77%	5,783	26.23%	10,479	47.53%	22,045
Wyoming	10,409	70.39%	4,379	29.61%	6,030	40.78%	14,788
Totals	276,212	70.51%	115,523	29.49%	160,689	41.02%	391,735

== District 10 ==
2024 Pennsylvania's 10th congressional district election
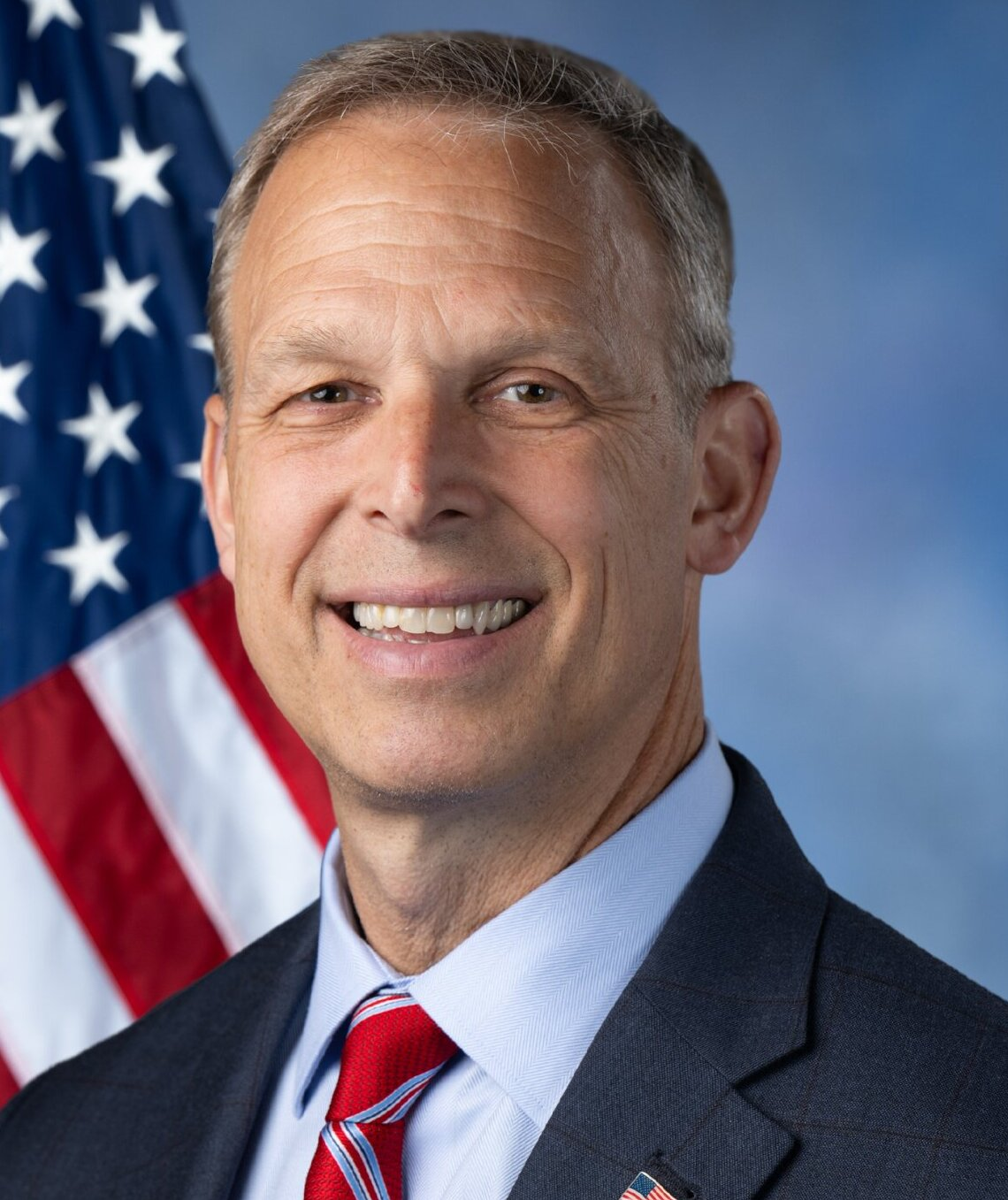

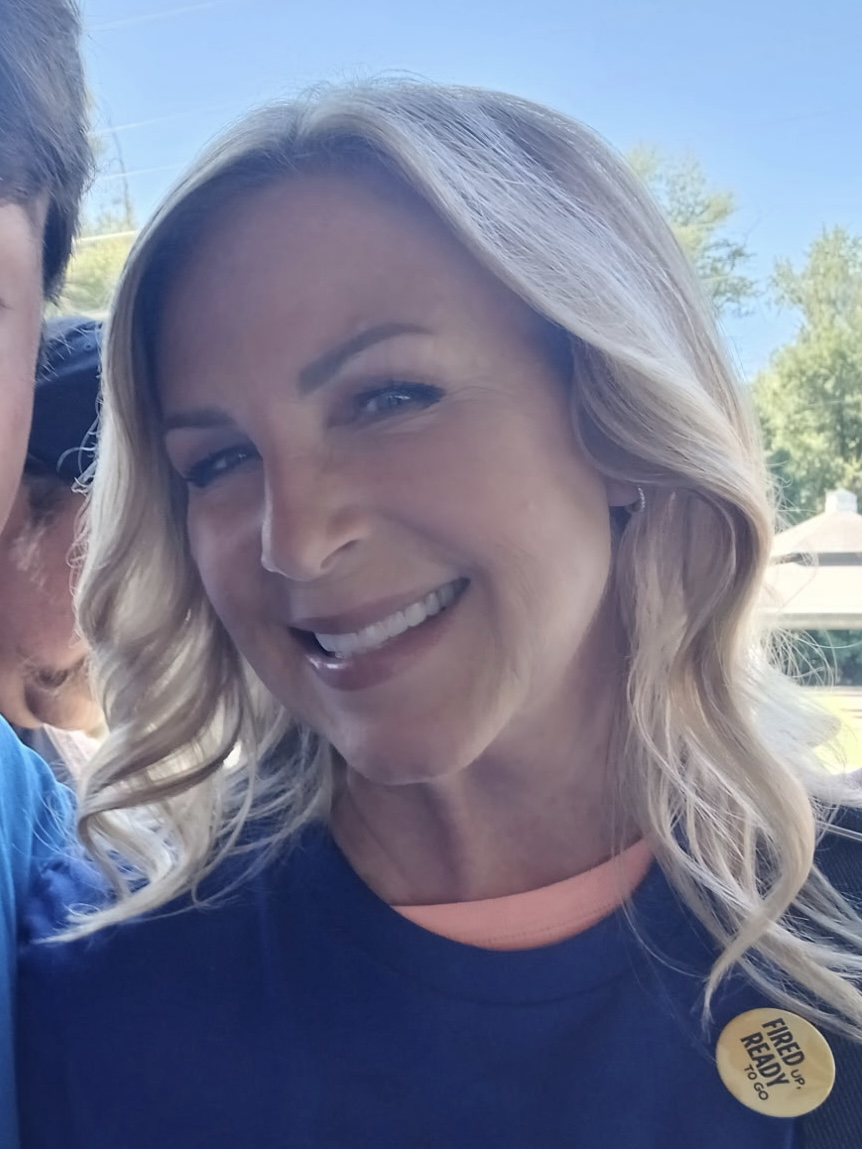
Nominee	Scott Perry	Janelle Stelson
Party	Republican	Democratic
Popular vote	205,567	200,434
Percentage	50.6%	49.4%
- County results Perry: 50–60% Stelson: 50–60%
U.S. Representative before election
Scott Perry
Republican
Elected U.S. Representative
Scott Perry
Republican

The 10th district is based in the Harrisburg and York areas, including all of Dauphin County, most of Cumberland County, and the northern half of York County. It had a PVI of R+5 and voted for Donald Trump by 4% in 2020. The incumbent was Republican Scott Perry, who was re-elected with 53.8% of the vote in 2022.

=== Republican primary ===
==== Nominee ====
- Scott Perry, incumbent U.S. representative

==== Endorsements ====
Scott Perry

Organizations

- AIPAC
- National Rifle Association Political Victory Fund
- Turning Point Action

==== Fundraising ====
Campaign finance reports as of September 30, 2024
Candidate	Raised	Spent	Cash on hand
Scott Perry (R)	$3,545,992	$3,002,273	$716,837
Source: Federal Election Commission

==== Results ====
Republican primary results
Party	Candidate	Votes	%
Republican	Scott Perry (incumbent)	61,596	100.0
Total votes		61,596	100.0

=== Democratic primary ===
==== Nominee ====
- Janelle Stelson, former WGAL news anchor

==== Eliminated in primary ====
- John Broadhurst, business development consultant
- Rick Coplen, Carlisle school board member and candidate for this district in 2022
- Shamaine Daniels, at-large Harrisburg city councilor and nominee for this district in 2022
- Blake Lynch, WITF-TV executive and former communications director for the Harrisburg Bureau of Police
- Mike O'Brien, retired U.S. Marine Corps lieutenant colonel

==== Withdrew ====
- Bob Forbes, teacher

==== Failed to qualify ====
- William Lillich, former truck driver

==== Endorsements ====
Shamaine Daniels

Organizations

- CASA in Action
- Latino Victory Fund
- National Organization for Women PAC
Blake Lynch

Local officials

- Wanda Williams, mayor of Harrisburg (2022–present)
Mike O'Brien

U.S representatives

- Seth Moulton, MA-06 (2015–present)

Organizations

- VoteVets

Labor unions

- International Brotherhood of Teamsters Local 776
Janelle Stelson

U.S. representatives

- Lois Frankel, FL-22 (2013–2017, 2023–present)

Organizations

- EMILY's List
- NewDem Action Fund

Labor unions

- United Mine Workers of America

==== Debates and forums ====
2024 PA-10 Democratic primary debates and forums
No.	Date	Host	Moderator	Link	Participants							
P Participant A Absent N Non-invitee I Invitee W Withdrawn												
P Participant A Absent N Non-invitee I Invitee W Withdrawn					Broadhurst	Coplen	Daniels	Forbes	Lillich	Lynch	O'Brien	Stelson
1	January 13, 2024	Dauphin County Democratic Party			P	P	P	P	P	P	P	P
2	March 6, 2024	WHTM abc27	Dennis Owens	abc27	P	P	P	W	N	P	P	P
3	March 10, 2024	Capital Region Stands Up	Dennis Owens & Cate Barron		P	P	P	W	N	P	P	A
4	March 25, 2024	PennLive	Berwood Yost		P	P	P	W	N	P	P	P
5	April 9, 2024	WGAL-TV	Tom Lehman & Katelyn Smith	WGAL	P	P	P	W	N	P	P	P

==== Fundraising ====
Campaign finance reports as of September 30, 2024
Candidate	Raised	Spent	Cash on hand
Mike O'Brien (D)	$791,228	$789,322	$1,906
Janelle Stelson (D)	$4,773,496	$3,399,353	$1,374,142
Rick Coplen (D)	$63,196	$54,859	$8,336
Blake Lynch (D)	$54,483	$32,593	$21,889
Shamaine Daniels (D)	$81,033	$81,113	$1,518
John Broadhurst (D)	$10,615	$1,451	$9,163
Source: Federal Election Commission

==== Polling ====
Poll source	Date(s) administered	Sample size	Margin of error	Rick Coplen	Shamaine Daniels	Blake Lynch	Mike O'Brien	Janelle Stelson	Undecided
Normington Petts (D) (Note: Poll conducted for Stelson's campaign)	February 26–28, 2024	400 (LV)	± 4.9%	3%	16%	5%	9%	36%	31%
Public Policy Polling (D)	October 16–17, 2023	547 (LV)	± 4.2%	3%	20%	3%	3%	33%	38%

==== Results ====
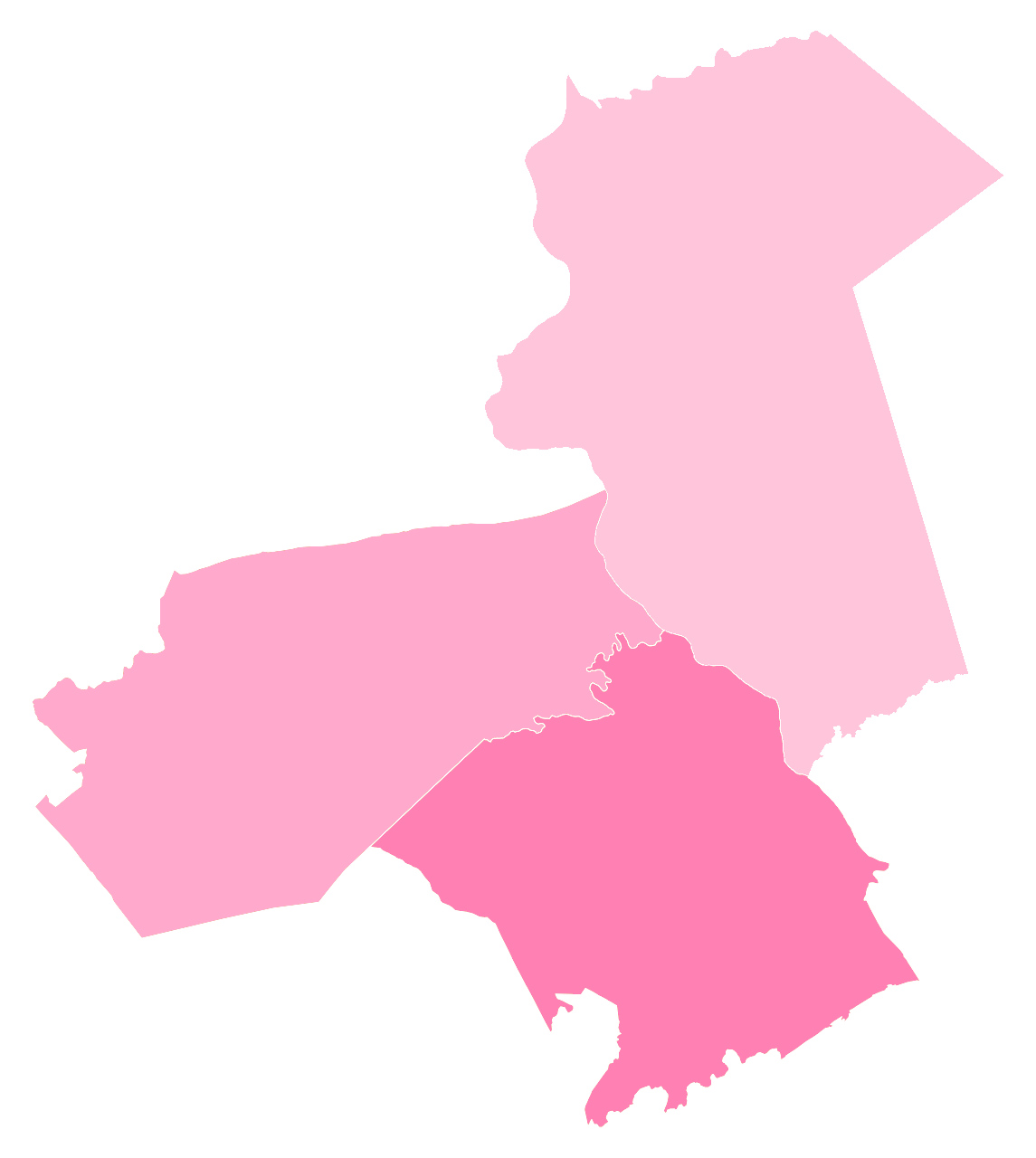
Primary results by county: Stelson—30–40% Stelson—40–50% Stelson—50–60%

Democratic primary results
Party	Candidate	Votes	%
Democratic	Janelle Stelson	26,591	43.8
Democratic	Mike O'Brien	14,103	23.3
Democratic	Shamaine Daniels	8,773	14.5
Democratic	Rick Coplen	5,464	9.0
Democratic	Blake Lynch	3,388	5.6
Democratic	John Broadhurst	2,322	3.8
Total votes		60,641	100.0

=== General election ===
==== Debate ====
2024 Pennsylvania's 10th congressional district debate
No.	Date	Host	Moderator	Link	Republican	Democratic
Key: P Participant A Absent N Not invited I Invited W Withdrawn						
Key: P Participant A Absent N Not invited I Invited W Withdrawn					Scott Perry	Janelle Stelson
1	Oct. 8, 2024	WHTM-TV	Dennis Owens	WHTM-TV	P	P

==== Predictions ====
Source	Ranking	As of
The Cook Political Report	Tossup	October 18, 2024
Inside Elections	Tilt R	September 12, 2024
Sabato's Crystal Ball	Lean R	September 7, 2023
Elections Daily	Lean D (flip)	November 4, 2024
CNalysis	Tilt D (flip)	November 4, 2024

==== Post-primary endorsements ====
Janelle Stelson (D)

U.S. representatives

- Barbara Comstock, former VA-10 (2015–2019) (Republican)
- Adam Kinzinger, former IL-16 (2011–2023) (Republican)
- Denver Riggleman, former VA-05 (2019–2021) (Independent)
- Dave Trott, former MI-11 (2015–2019) (Republican)
- Joe Walsh, former IL-08 (2011–2013) (Independent)

Organizations

- CASA in Action
- Democratic Majority for Israel
- End Citizens United
- Everytown for Gun Safety
- Jewish Democratic Council of America

==== Polling ====
Poll source	Date(s) administered	Sample size	Margin of error	Scott Perry (R)	Janelle Stelson (D)	Undecided
Susquehanna Polling & Research (R)	October 4–7, 2024	300 (LV)	± 5.0%	39%	48%	13%
Upswing Research (D) (Note: Poll conducted for the Democratic Congressional Campaign Committee)	July 30 – August 2, 2024	600 (LV)	± 4.0%	47%	48%	5%
Franklin & Marshall College	May 28 – June 2, 2024	397 (RV)	± 6.1%	45%	44%	11%
Normington Petts (D)	May 21–23, 2024	400 (LV)	± 4.9%	51%	48%	1%
Public Policy Polling (D)	April 24–25, 2024	532 (V)	± 4.3%	45%	43%	12%

==== Results ====
Pennsylvania's 10th congressional district, 2024
Party	Candidate	Votes	%
Republican	Scott Perry (incumbent)	205,567	50.6
Democratic	Janelle Stelson	200,434	49.4
Total votes		406,001	100.0
Republican hold			

==== By county ====
County	Scott Perry Republican		Janelle Stelson Democratic		Margin		Total votes cast
County	#	%	#	%	#	%	Total votes cast
Cumberland	70,036	51.91%	64,891	48.09%	5,145	3.81%	134,927
Dauphin	66,986	45.49%	80,272	54.51%	−13,286	−9.02%	147,258
York	68,545	55.36%	55,271	44.64%	13,274	10.72%	123,816
Totals	205,567	50.63%	200,434	49.37%	5,133	1.26%	406,001

== District 11 ==
2024 Pennsylvania's 11th congressional district election
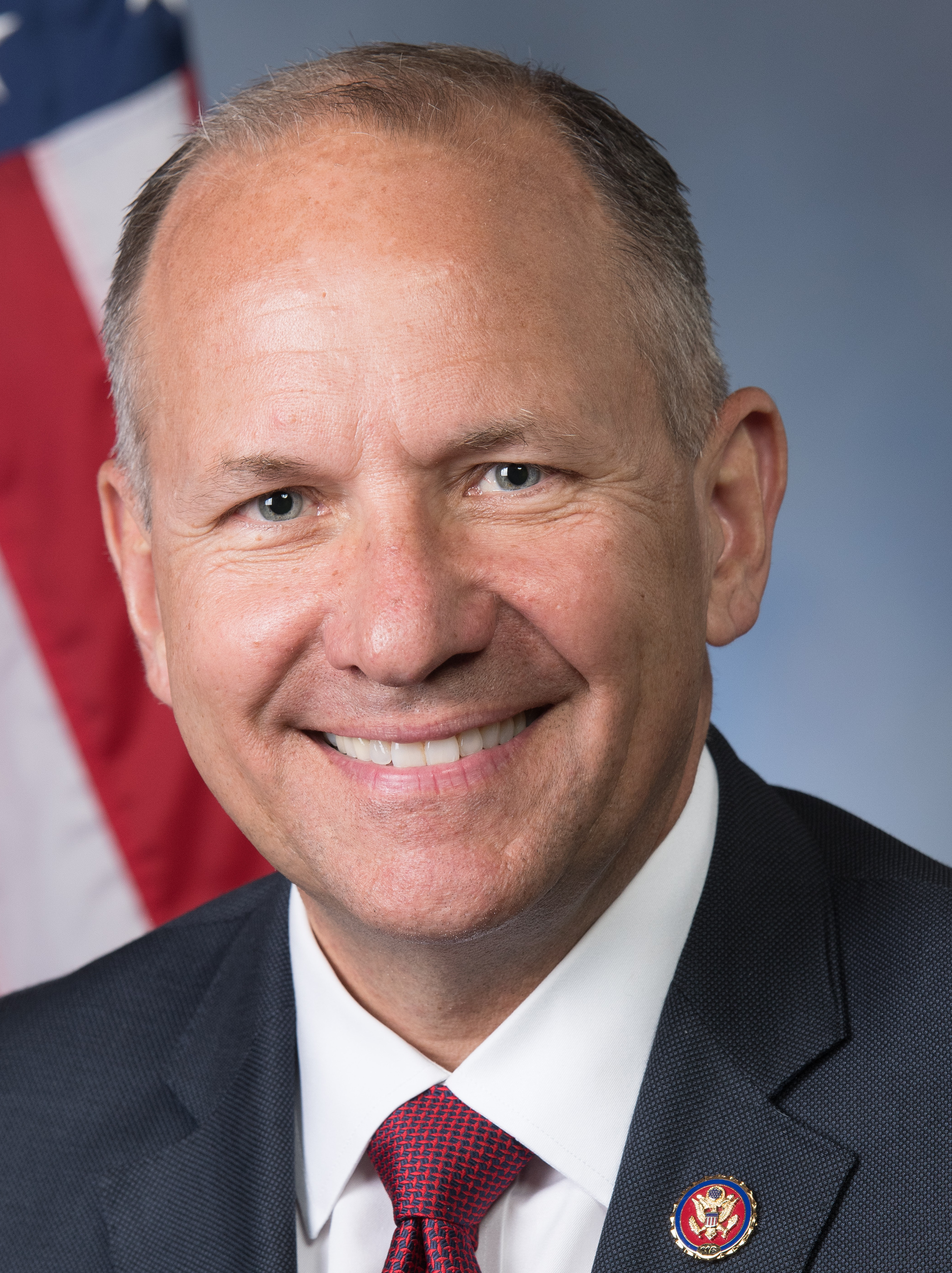

Nominee	Lloyd Smucker	Jim Atkinson
Party	Republican	Democratic
Popular vote	253,672	149,641
Percentage	62.9%	37.1%
- County results Smucker: 60–70%
U.S. Representative before election
Lloyd Smucker
Republican
Elected U.S. Representative
Lloyd Smucker
Republican

The 11th district is based in Pennsylvania Dutch Country, including all of Lancaster County and the southern half of York County. It had a PVI of R+13 and voted for Donald Trump by 21% in 2020. The incumbent was Republican Lloyd Smucker, who was re-elected with 61.6% of the vote in 2022.

=== Republican primary ===
==== Nominee ====
- Lloyd Smucker, incumbent U.S. representative

==== Endorsements ====
Lloyd Smucker

Organizations

- AIPAC
- National Rifle Association Political Victory Fund

==== Fundraising ====
Campaign finance reports as of July 31, 2024
Candidate	Raised	Spent	Cash on hand
Lloyd Smucker (R)	$1,372,075	$749,344	$1,502,555
Source: Federal Election Commission

==== Results ====
Republican primary results
Party	Candidate	Votes	%
Republican	Lloyd Smucker (incumbent)	68,039	100.0
Total votes		68,039	100.0

=== Democratic primary ===
==== Nominee ====
- Jim Atkinson, pilot

==== Fundraising ====
Campaign finance reports as of July 31, 2024
Candidate	Raised	Spent	Cash on hand
David Baker (D)	$7,230	$7,011	$219
James Atkinson (D)	$8,566	$7,081	$1,485
Source: Federal Election Commission

==== Results ====
Democratic primary results
Party	Candidate	Votes	%
Democratic	Jim Atkinson	38,559	100.0
Total votes		38,559	100.0

=== General election ===
==== Predictions ====
Source	Ranking	As of
The Cook Political Report	Solid R	December 12, 2023
Inside Elections	Solid R	December 15, 2023
Sabato's Crystal Ball	Safe R	September 7, 2023
Elections Daily	Safe R	February 5, 2024
CNalysis	Solid R	November 16, 2023

==== Results ====
Pennsylvania's 11th congressional district, 2024
Party	Candidate	Votes	%
Republican	Lloyd Smucker (incumbent)	253,672	62.9
Democratic	Jim Atkinson	149,641	37.1
Total votes		403,313	100.0
Republican hold			

==== By county ====
County	Lloyd Smucker Republican		Jim Atkinson Democratic		Margin		Total votes cast
County	#	%	#	%	#	%	Total votes cast
Lancaster	170,624	60.27%	112,467	39.73%	58,157	20.54%	283,091
York	83,048	69.08%	37,174	30.92%	45,874	38.16%	120,222
Totals	253,672	62.90%	149,641	37.10%	104,031	25.79%	403,313

== District 12 ==
2024 Pennsylvania's 12th congressional district election
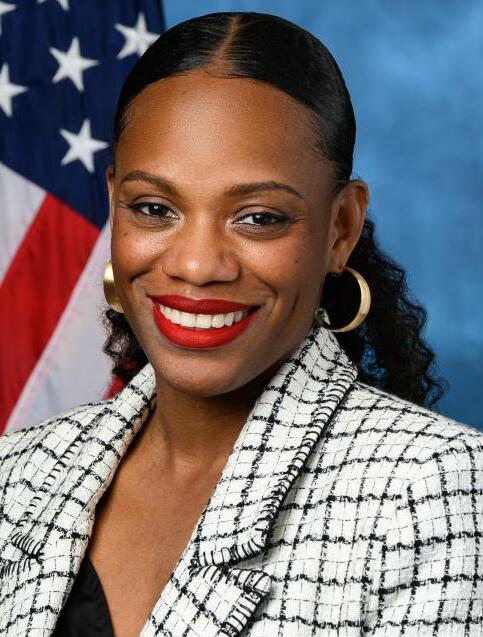

Nominee	Summer Lee	James Hayes
Party	Democratic	Republican
Popular vote	234,802	181,426
Percentage	56.4%	43.6%
- County results Lee: 60–70% Hayes: 60–70%
U.S. Representative before election
Summer Lee
Democratic
Elected U.S. Representative
Summer Lee
Democratic

The 12th district is based in the city of Pittsburgh and its eastern and southern suburbs, including parts of Allegheny and Westmoreland counties. It had a PVI of D+8 and voted for Joe Biden by 20% in 2020. The incumbent was Democrat Summer Lee, who was elected with 56.2% of the vote in 2022.

=== Democratic primary ===
==== Nominee ====
- Summer Lee, incumbent U.S. representative

==== Eliminated in primary ====
- Bhavini Patel, Edgewood borough councilor and candidate for this district in 2022

==== Withdrawn ====
- Laurie MacDonald, nonprofit executive

==== Declined ====
- Corey O'Connor, Allegheny County controller (endorsed Lee)
- Lindsay Powell, state representative from the 21st district (2023–present)

==== Endorsements ====
Summer Lee

U.S. senators

- Bob Casey, Pennsylvania (2007–2025)
- John Fetterman, Pennsylvania (2023–present)
- Bernie Sanders, Vermont (2007–present)

U.S. representatives

- Pete Aguilar, CA-33 (2015–present)
- Katherine Clark, MA-05 (2013–present)
- Hakeem Jeffries, NY-08 and House Minority Leader

State legislators

- Lindsey Williams, 38th district (2019–present)
- 6 state representatives

Local officials

- Ed Gainey, mayor of Pittsburgh (2022–present)
- Sara Innamorato, Allegheny County executive (2024–present)
- Michelle McFall, chair of the Westmoreland County Democratic Party
- Corey O'Connor, Allegheny County controller
- 5 Allegheny County councilors

Organizations

- Allegheny County Democratic Committee
- Bend the Arc
- Center for Biological Diversity Action Fund
- End Citizens United
- Food & Water Action
- Friends of the Earth Action
- J Street PAC
- Jewish Voice for Peace Action fund
- Justice Democrats
- League of Conservation Voters
- MoveOn
- National Organization for Women PAC
- National Women's Political Caucus
- NextGen America PAC (post-primary)
- Peace Action
- People's Action
- Planned Parenthood Action Fund
- Population Connection Action Fund
- Sunrise Movement
- Working Families Party

Labor unions

- American Federation of Teachers Pennsylvania
- International Association of Fire Fighters Pittsburgh
- International Union of Painters and Allied Trades
- National Education Association
- National Nurses United
- National Postal Mail Handlers Union
- Pennsylvania AFL–CIO
- SEIU 32BJ
- UNITE HERE Local 57
- United Electrical Workers
- United Food and Commercial Workers
- Teamsters Joint Council 40
Bhavini Patel

Organizations

- Hindu American PAC
- WelcomePAC

Labor unions

- International Association of Sheet Metal, Air, Rail and Transportation Workers
- International Brotherhood of Electrical Workers Local 5
- International Union of Operating Engineers Local 66
- Steamfitters Local 449

==== Debates and forums ====
2024 PA-12 Democratic primary debates and forums
No.	Date	Host	Moderator	Link	Participants		
P Participant A Absent N Non-invitee I Invitee W Withdrawn							
P Participant A Absent N Non-invitee I Invitee W Withdrawn					Lee	MacDonald	Patel
1	January 28, 2024	Carnegie Mellon University	Chris Potter, Avalon Sueiro, Heidi Norman		P	P	P
2	April 4, 2024	WPXI-TV	Lisa Sylvester		P	W	P

==== Fundraising ====
Campaign finance reports as of July 31, 2024
Candidate	Raised	Spent	Cash on hand
Summer Lee (D)	$2,695,289	$1,760,654	$959,001
Bhavini Patel (D)	$700,471	$667,405	$53,645
Source: Federal Election Commission

==== Results ====

Lee

40–50%
50–60%
60–70%
70–80%
80–90%
90–100%

Patel

40–50%
50–60%
60–70%
70–80%

Other

40–50% tie
50% tie
No votes

Democratic primary results
Party	Candidate	Votes	%
Democratic	Summer Lee (incumbent)	64,594	60.65
Democratic	Bhavini Patel	41,902	39.35
Total votes		106,496	100.0

=== Republican primary ===
==== Nominee ====
- James Hayes, manufacturing executive

==== Fundraising ====
Campaign finance reports as of July 31, 2024
Candidate	Raised	Spent	Cash on hand
James Hayes (R)	$85,846	$69,739	$16,106
Source: Federal Election Commission

==== Results ====
Republican primary results
Party	Candidate	Votes	%
Republican	James Hayes	34,759	100.0
Total votes		34,759	100.0

=== General election ===
==== Predictions ====
Source	Ranking	As of
The Cook Political Report	Solid D	December 12, 2023
Inside Elections	Solid D	December 15, 2023
Sabato's Crystal Ball	Safe D	September 7, 2023
Elections Daily	Safe D	February 5, 2024
CNalysis	Solid D	November 16, 2023

==== Results ====
Pennsylvania's 12th congressional district, 2024
Party	Candidate	Votes	%
Democratic	Summer Lee (incumbent)	234,802	56.4
Republican	James Hayes	181,426	43.6
Total votes		416,228	100.0
Democratic hold			

==== By county ====
County	Summer Lee Democratic		James Hayes Republican		Margin		Total votes cast
County	#	%	#	%	#	%	Total votes cast
Allegheny	211,948	61.06%	135,159	38.94%	76,789	22.12%	347,107
Westmoreland	22,854	33.06%	46,267	66.93%	−23,413	−33.87%	69,121
Totals	234,802	56.41%	181,426	43.59%	53,376	12.82%	416,228

== District 13 ==
2024 Pennsylvania's 13th congressional district election
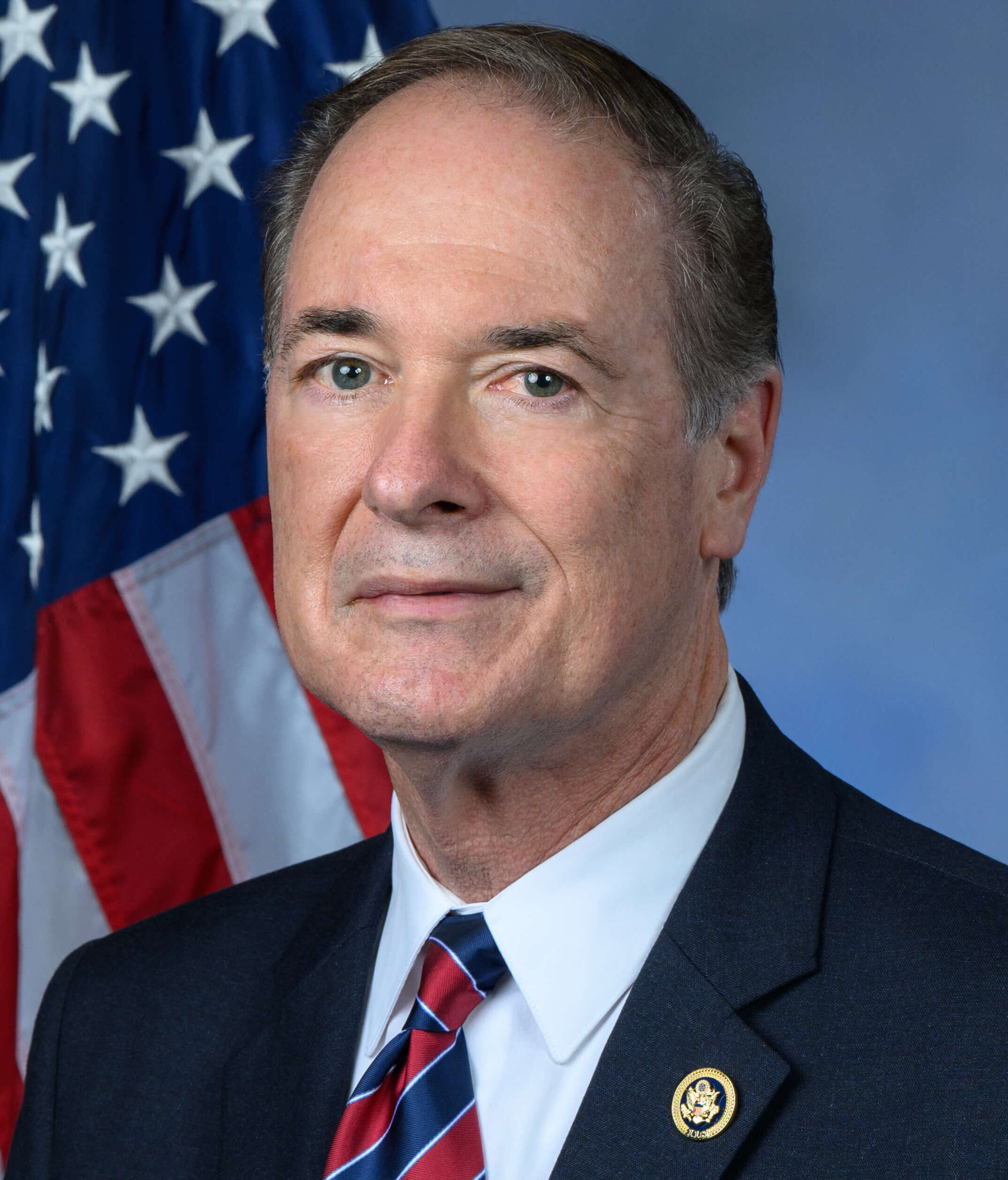

Nominee	John Joyce	Beth Farnham
Party	Republican	Democratic
Popular vote	301,460	104,823
Percentage	74.2%	25.8%
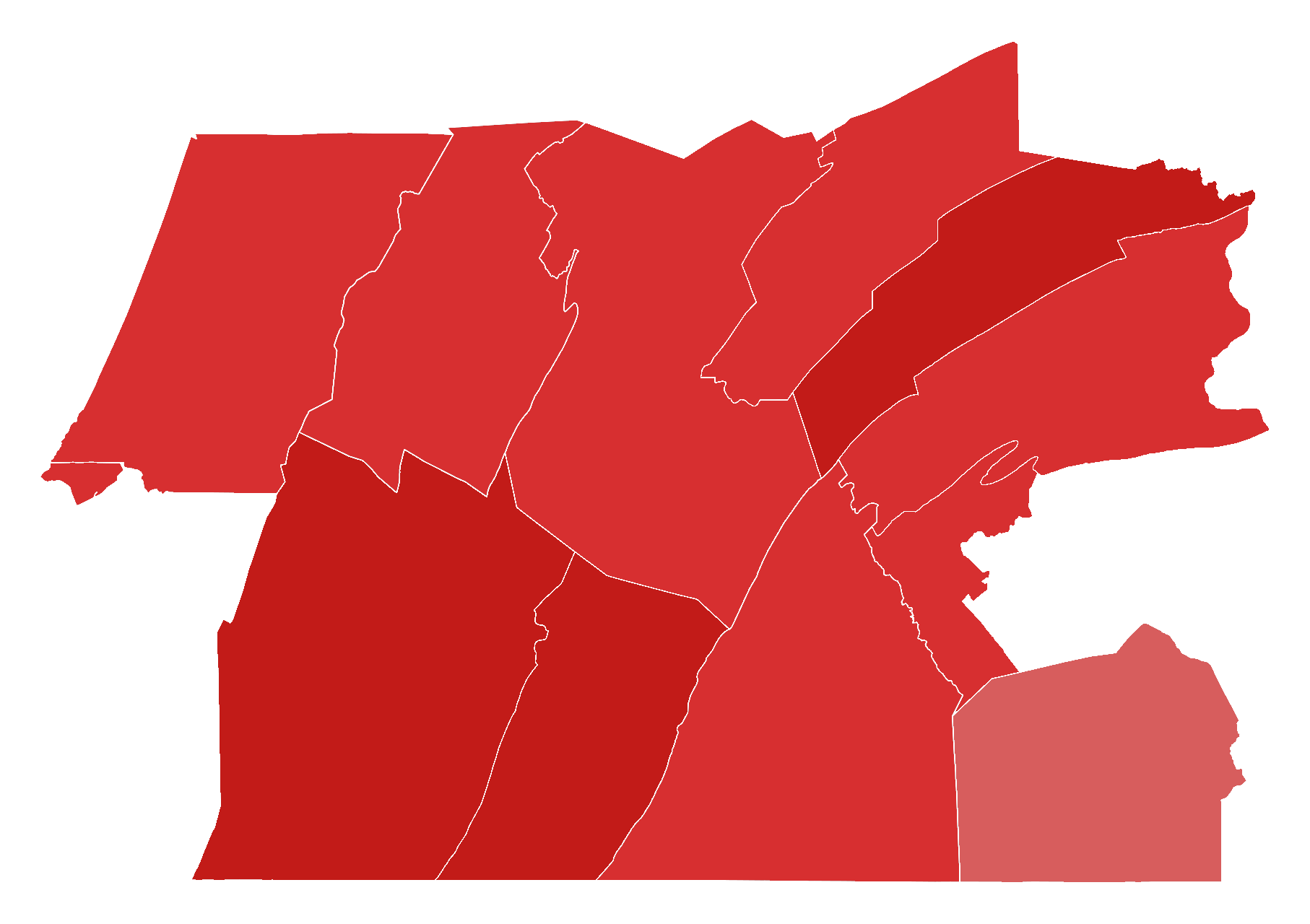
- County results Joyce: 60–70% 70–80% 80–90%
U.S. Representative before election
John Joyce
Republican
Elected U.S. Representative
John Joyce
Republican

The 13th district is based in South Central Pennsylvania, including Johnstown, Altoona, and Gettysburg. It had a PVI of R+25 and voted for Donald Trump by 45% in 2020. The incumbent was Republican John Joyce, who was re-elected unopposed in 2022.

=== Republican primary ===
==== Nominee ====
- John Joyce, incumbent U.S. representative

==== Endorsements ====
John Joyce

Organizations

- National Rifle Association Political Victory Fund

==== Fundraising ====
Campaign finance reports as of July 31, 2024
Candidate	Raised	Spent	Cash on hand
John Joyce (R)	$1,786,992	$978,413	$2,620,748
Source: Federal Election Commission

==== Results ====
Republican primary results
Party	Candidate	Votes	%
Republican	John Joyce (incumbent)	82,675	100.0
Total votes		82,675	100.0

=== Democratic primary ===
==== Nominee ====
- Beth Farnham, former Conewago Valley School District Board member and write-in candidate for this district in 2022

==== Endorsements ====
Beth Farnham

Labor unions

- United Mine Workers of America

==== Results ====
Democratic primary results
Party	Candidate	Votes	%
Democratic	Beth Farnham	32,568	100.0
Total votes		32,568	100.0

=== General election ===
==== Predictions ====
Source	Ranking	As of
The Cook Political Report	Solid R	December 12, 2023
Inside Elections	Solid R	December 15, 2023
Sabato's Crystal Ball	Safe R	September 7, 2023
Elections Daily	Safe R	February 5, 2024
CNalysis	Solid R	November 16, 2023

==== Results ====
Pennsylvania's 13th congressional district, 2024
Party	Candidate	Votes	%
Republican	John Joyce (incumbent)	301,460	74.2
Democratic	Beth Farnham	104,823	25.8
Total votes		406,283	100.0
Republican hold			

==== By county ====
County	John Joyce Republican		Beth Farnham Democratic		Margin		Total votes cast
County	#	%	#	%	#	%	Total votes cast
Adams	40,997	68.54%	18,815	31.46%	22,182	37.09%	59,812
Bedford	23,381	85.30%	4,029	14.70%	19,352	70.60%	27,410
Blair	47,627	74.00%	16,731	26.00%	30,896	48.01%	64,358
Cambria	49,416	70.59%	20,586	29.41%	28,830	41.18%	70,002
Cumberland	8,299	70.62%	3,453	29.38%	4,846	41.24%	11,752
Franklin	60,205	73.15%	22,096	26.85%	38,109	46.30%	82,301
Fulton	7,021	87.10%	1,040	12.90%	5,981	74.20%	8,061
Huntingdon	17,848	77.94%	5,052	22.06%	12,796	55.88%	22,900
Juniata	9,644	81.14%	2,242	18.86%	7,402	62.28%	11,886
Mifflin	17,132	79.11%	4,524	20.89%	12,608	58.22%	21,656
Perry	19,169	76.06%	6,035	23.94%	13,134	52.11%	25,204
Somerset	721	76.62%	220	23.38%	501	53.24%	941
Totals	301,460	74.20%	104,823	25.80%	196,637	48.40%	406,283

== District 14 ==
2024 Pennsylvania's 14th congressional district election
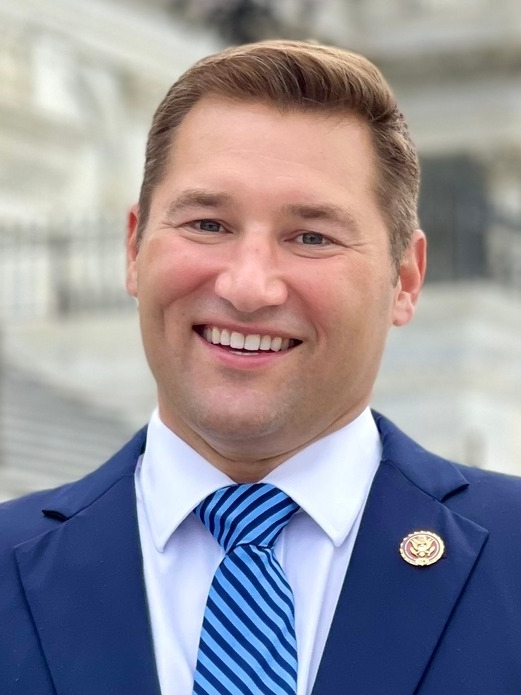

Nominee	Guy Reschenthaler	Chris Dziados
Party	Republican	Democratic
Popular vote	268,380	134,755
Percentage	66.6%	33.4%
- County results Reschenthaler: 60–70% 70–80%
U.S. Representative before election
Guy Reschenthaler
Republican
Elected U.S. Representative
Guy Reschenthaler
Republican

The 14th district is based in Southwest Pennsylvania, including all of Washington, Greene, and Fayette counties, most of Indiana and Somerset counties, and parts of Westmoreland County. It had a PVI of R+18 and voted for Donald Trump by 32% in 2020. The incumbent was Republican Guy Reschenthaler, who was re-elected unopposed in 2022.

=== Republican primary ===
==== Nominee ====
- Guy Reschenthaler, incumbent U.S. representative

==== Endorsement ====
Guy Reschenthaler

Organizations

- AIPAC
- Humane Society Legislative Fund
- National Rifle Association Political Victory Fund
- Pro-Israel America

==== Fundraising ====
Campaign finance reports as of July 31, 2023
Candidate	Raised	Spent	Cash on hand
Guy Reschenthaler (R)	$2,619,183	$2,238,03	$885,645
Source: Federal Election Commission

==== Results ====
Republican primary results
Party	Candidate	Votes	%
Republican	Guy Reschenthaler (incumbent)	63,162	100.0
Total votes		63,162	100.0

=== Democratic primary ===
==== Nominee ====
- Chris Dziados, defense policy advisor

==== Eliminated in primary ====
- Ken Bach, former Yough School District Board member

==== Endorsements ====
Ken Bach

Organizations

- Vote Common Good

==== Fundraising ====
Campaign finance reports as of December 31, 2023
Candidate	Raised	Spent	Cash on hand
Ken Bach (D)	$2,020	$0	$2,020
Source: Federal Election Commission

==== Results ====
Primary results by county: Dziados—90–100% Dziados—80–90% Bach—50–60% Bach—60–70% Bach—70–80%

Dziados won the western part of the district, securing landslide results in the Washington and Greene counties. In contrast, Bach performed well in the eastern part, recording his best performance in the portion of Westmoreland County.

Democratic primary results
Party	Candidate	Votes	%
Democratic	Chris Dziados	29,268	51.8
Democratic	Ken Bach	27,193	48.2
Total votes		56,461	100.0

=== General election ===
==== Predictions ====
Source	Ranking	As of
The Cook Political Report	Solid R	December 12, 2023
Inside Elections	Solid R	December 15, 2023
Sabato's Crystal Ball	Safe R	September 7, 2023
Elections Daily	Safe R	February 5, 2024
CNalysis	Solid R	November 16, 2023

==== Results ====
Pennsylvania's 14th congressional district, 2024
Party	Candidate	Votes	%
Republican	Guy Reschenthaler (incumbent)	268,380	66.6
Democratic	Chris Dziados	134,755	33.4
Total votes		403,135	100.0
Republican hold			

==== By county ====
County	Guy Reschenthaler Republican		Chris Dziados Democratic		Margin		Total votes cast
County	#	%	#	%	#	%	Total votes cast
Fayette	38,200	67.80%	18,142	32.20%	20,058	45.60%	56,342
Indiana	12,081	71.42%	4,834	28.58%	7,247	42.84%	16,915
Somerset	25,493	67.98%	12,009	32.02%	13,484	35.96%	37,502
Greene	30,904	78.60%	8,413	21.40%	22,491	57.20%	39,317
Totals	268,380	66.57%	134,755	33.43%	33.146	25.79%	403,135

== District 15 ==
2024 Pennsylvania's 15th congressional district election
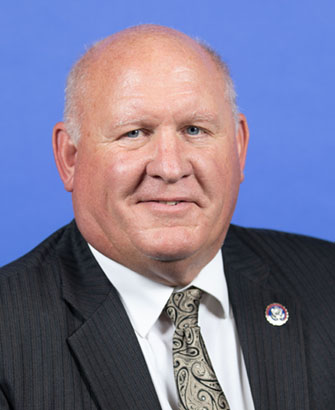

Nominee	Glenn Thompson	Zacheray Womer
Party	Republican	Democratic
Popular vote	279,027	111,408
Percentage	71.5%	28.5%
- County results Thompson: 50–60% 60–70% 70–80% 80–90%
U.S. Representative before election
Glenn Thompson
Republican
Elected U.S. Representative
Glenn Thompson
Republican

The incumbent was Republican Glenn Thompson, who was re-elected with 69.9% of the vote in 2022.

=== Republican primary ===
==== Nominee ====
- Glenn Thompson, incumbent U.S. representative

==== Endorsements ====
Glenn Thompson

Organizations

- AIPAC
- National Rifle Association Political Victory Fund

==== Fundraising ====
Campaign finance reports as of July 31, 2024
Candidate	Raised	Spent	Cash on hand
Glenn Thompson (R)	$2,334,055	$1,810,637	$877,193
Source: Federal Election Commission

==== Results ====
Republican primary results
Party	Candidate	Votes	%
Republican	Glenn Thompson (incumbent)	75,645	100.0
Total votes		75,645	100.0

=== Democratic primary ===
==== Nominee ====
- Zacheray Womer, law student

==== Endorsements ====
Zacheray Womer

Labor unions

- United Mine Workers of America

==== Results ====
Democratic primary results
Party	Candidate	Votes	%
Democratic	Zacheray Womer	35,574	100.0
Total votes		35,574	100.0

=== General election ===
==== Predictions ====
Source	Ranking	As of
The Cook Political Report	Solid R	December 12, 2023
Inside Elections	Solid R	December 15, 2023
Sabato's Crystal Ball	Safe R	September 7, 2023
Elections Daily	Safe R	February 5, 2024
CNalysis	Solid R	November 16, 2023

==== Results ====
Pennsylvania's 15th congressional district, 2024
Party	Candidate	Votes	%
Republican	Glenn Thompson (incumbent)	279,027	71.5
Democratic	Zacheray Womer	111,408	28.5
Total votes		390,435	100.0
Republican hold			

==== By county ====
County	Glenn Thompson Republican		Zacheray Womer Democratic		Margin		Total votes cast
County	#	%	#	%	#	%	Total votes cast
Armstrong	27,657	76.92%	8,297	23.08%	19,360	53 85%	35,954
Cameron	1,703	78.99%	453	21 01%	1,250	57.98%	2,156
Centre	41,234	51.84%	38,307	48.16%	2,927	3.68%	79,541
Greene	14,997	78.94%	4,002	21.16%	10,995	57.87%	18,999
Clearfield	31,266	78.38%	8,622	21.62%	22,644	26.77%	39,888
Clinton	13,269	72.52%	5,028	27.48%	8,241	45.04%	18,297
Elk	13,101	77.01%	3,912	22.99%	9,189	54.01%	17,013
Forest	1,986	75.43%	647	24.57%	1,339	50.85%	2,633
Indiana	3,358	84.54%	614	15.46%	2,744	69.08%	3,972
Jefferson	18,514	81.73%	4,138	18.27%	14,376	63.46%	22,652
Lycoming	17,992	78.99%	4,787	21.01%	13,205	57.97%	22,779
McKean	15,019	77.26%	4,420	22.74%	10,599	54.52%	19,439
Potter	7,525	83.68%	1,468	16.32%	6,057	67.35%	8,993
Snyder	14,685	74.72%	4,969	25.28%	9,716	49.44%	19,654
Tioga	16,631	78.53%	4,546	21.47%	12,085	57.07%	21,177
Union	13,406	64.26%	7,455	35.74%	5,951	28.52%	20,861
Venango	11,871	73.67%	4,242	26.33%	7,629	47.35%	16,113
Warren	14,813	72.92%	5,501	27.08%	9,312	45.84%	20,314
Totals	279,027	71.47%	111,408	28.53%	167,619	42.93%	390,435

== District 16 ==
2024 Pennsylvania's 16th congressional district election
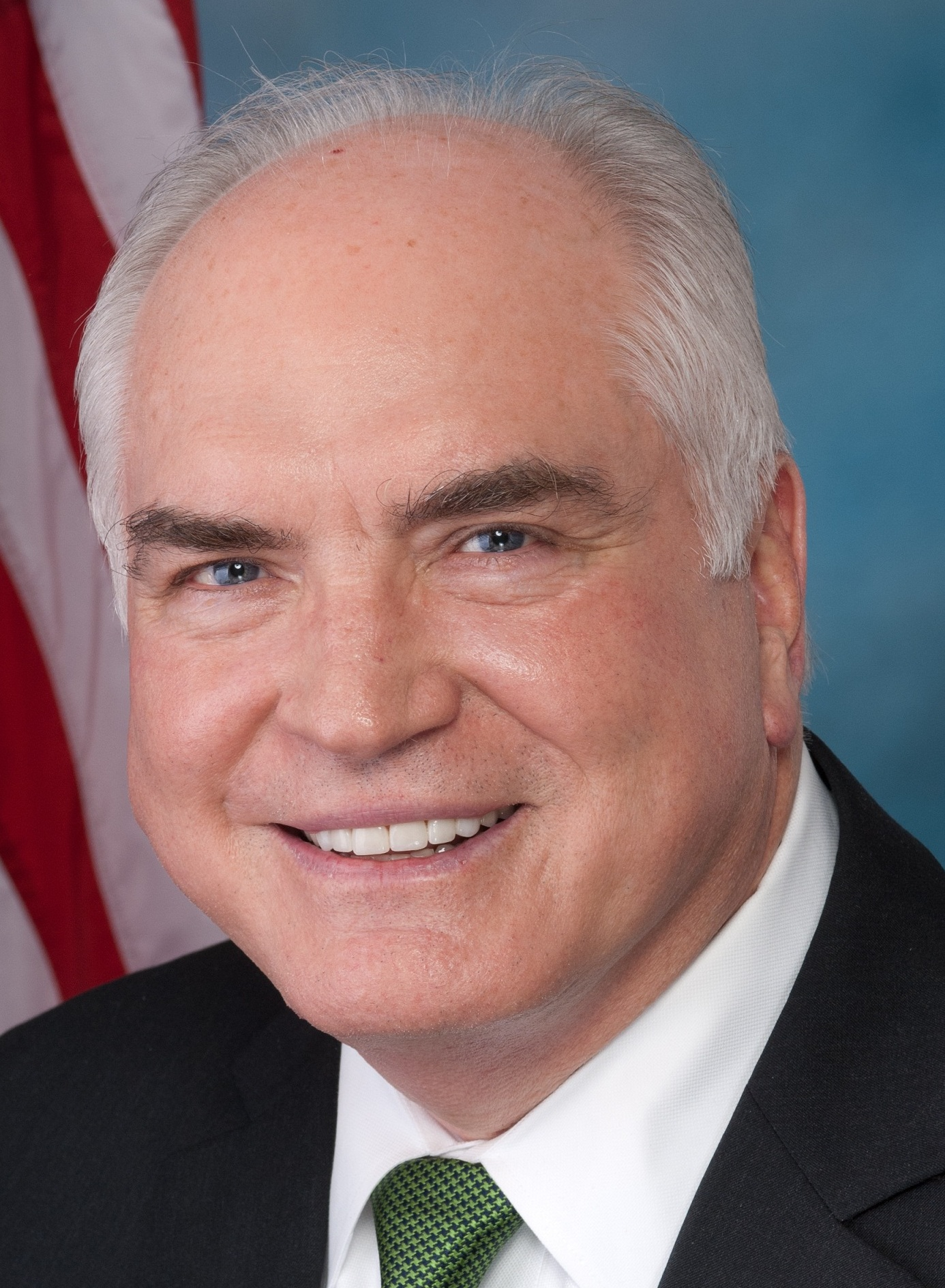

Nominee	Mike Kelly	Preston Nouri
Party	Republican	Democratic
Popular vote	256,923	146,709
Percentage	63.7%	36.3%
- County results Kelly: 50–60% 60–70% 70–80%
U.S. Representative before election
Mike Kelly
Republican
Elected U.S. Representative
Mike Kelly
Republican

The 16th district is located in Northwestern Pennsylvania, and contains all of Erie, Crawford, Mercer, Lawrence and Butler counties, and part of Venango County. It had a PVI of R+13 and voted for Donald Trump by 18% in 2020. The incumbent was Republican Mike Kelly, who was re-elected with 59.4% of the vote in 2022.

=== Republican primary ===
==== Nominee ====
- Mike Kelly, incumbent U.S. representative

==== Disqualified ====
- Tim Kramer, tax preparation nonprofit executive

==== Endorsements ====
Mike Kelly

Organizations

- AIPAC
- National Rifle Association Political Victory Fund

==== Fundraising ====
Campaign finance reports as of July 31, 2024
Candidate	Raised	Spent	Cash on hand
Mike Kelly (R)	$1,164,674	$647,760	$1,416,120
Tim Kramer (R) (Note: Withdrawn candidate)	$14,250	$14,162	$87
Source: Federal Election Commission

==== Results ====
Republican primary results
Party	Candidate	Votes	%
Republican	Mike Kelly (incumbent)	60,255	100.0
Total votes		60,255	100.0

=== Democratic primary ===
==== Nominee ====
- Preston Nouri, legislative analyst and former congressional aide

==== Endorsements ====
Preston Nouri

Labor unions

- International Brotherhood of Teamsters joint council 40

==== Fundraising ====
Campaign finance reports as of July 31, 2024
Candidate	Raised	Spent	Cash on hand
Preston Nouri (D)	$411,927 (Note: $20,000 of this total was self-funded by Nouri)	$324,603	$87,323
Source: Federal Election Commission

==== Results ====
Democratic primary results
Party	Candidate	Votes	%
Democratic	Preston Nouri	49,283	100.0
Total votes		49,283	100.0

=== General election ===
==== Predictions ====
Source	Ranking	As of
The Cook Political Report	Solid R	December 12, 2023
Inside Elections	Solid R	December 15, 2023
Sabato's Crystal Ball	Safe R	September 7, 2023
Elections Daily	Safe R	February 5, 2024
CNalysis	Solid R	November 16, 2023

==== Results ====
Pennsylvania's 16th congressional district, 2024
Party	Candidate	Votes	%
Republican	Mike Kelly (incumbent)	256,923	63.7
Democratic	Preston Nouri	146,709	36.3
Total votes		403,632	100.0
Republican hold			

==== By county ====
County	Mike Kelly Republican		Preston Nouri Democratic		Margin		Total votes cast
County	#	%	#	%	#	%	Total votes cast
Butler	83,045	69.31%	36,777	30.69%	46,268	30.61%	119,822
Crawford	26,223	70.13%	11,167	29.87%	15,056	40.27%	37,390
Erie	69,490	52.54%	62,766	47.46%	6,724	5.08%	132,256
Lawrence	31,819	68.53%	14,612	31.47%	17,207	37.06%	46,431
Totals	256,923	63.65%	146,709	36.35%	110,214	27.31%	403,632

== District 17 ==
2024 Pennsylvania's 17th congressional district election
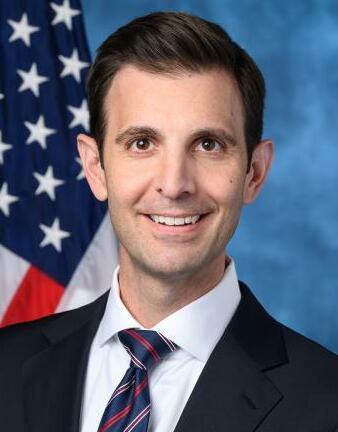

Nominee	Chris Deluzio	Rob Mercuri
Party	Democratic	Republican
Popular vote	242,838	207,900
Percentage	53.9%	46.1%
- Deluzio: 50–60% 60–70% 70–80% 80–90% >90% Mercuri: 40–50% 50–60% 60–70% 70–80% 80–90% Tie: 40–50% 50%
U.S. Representative before election
Chris Deluzio
Democratic
Elected U.S. Representative
Chris Deluzio
Democratic

The 17th district is based in the western and northern suburbs of Pittsburgh, including parts of Allegheny County and all of Beaver County. It had an even PVI and voted for Joe Biden by 6% in 2020. The incumbent was Democrat Chris Deluzio, who was elected with 53.4% of the vote in 2022.

=== Democratic primary ===
==== Nominee ====
- Chris Deluzio, incumbent U.S. representative

==== Endorsements ====
Chris Deluzio

Statewide officials

- Gretchen Whitmer, governor of Michigan (2019–present)

U.S representatives

- Seth Moulton, MA-06 (2015–present)

Organizations

- AIPAC
- Allegheny County Democratic Committee
- Bend the Arc
- Brady PAC
- Democratic Majority for Israel
- End Citizens United
- Everytown for Gun Safety Action Fund
- Giffords
- J Street PAC
- Jewish Democratic Council of America
- League of Conservation Voters
- NARAL Pro-Choice America
- NextGen America PAC (post-primary)
- Planned Parenthood Action Fund
- Population Connection Action Fund
- With Honor Fund

Labor unions

- International Brotherhood of Teamsters joint council 40
- National Education Association
- United Mine Workers of America

==== Fundraising ====
Campaign finance reports as of July 31, 2024
Candidate	Raised	Spent	Cash on hand
Chris Deluzio (D)	$2,990,955	$1,141,546	$1,871,536
Source: Federal Election Commission

==== Results ====
Democratic primary results
Party	Candidate	Votes	%
Democratic	Chris Deluzio (incumbent)	85,265	100.0
Total votes		85,265	100.0

=== Republican primary ===
==== Nominee ====
- Rob Mercuri, state representative from the 28th district (2021–present)

==== Withdrawn ====
- Jim Nelson, pastor

==== Declined ====
- Jeremy Shaffer, former Ross Township commissioner and nominee for this district in 2022 (running for state house)

==== Endorsements ====
Rob Mercuri

Organizations

- Americans for Prosperity
- Congressional Leadership Fund (post-primary)
- U.S. Chamber of Commerce

==== Fundraising ====
Campaign finance reports as of July 31, 2024
Candidate	Raised	Spent	Cash on hand
Rob Mercuri (R)	$1,095,445	$294,186	$801,258
Jim Nelson (R)	$46,085	$46,085	$0
Source: Federal Election Commission

==== Results ====
Republican primary results
Party	Candidate	Votes	%
Republican	Rob Mercuri	46,974	100.0
Total votes		46,974	100.0

=== General election ===
==== Predictions ====
Source	Ranking	As of
The Cook Political Report	Lean D	December 12, 2023
Inside Elections	Likely D	September 12, 2024
Sabato's Crystal Ball	Lean D	September 7, 2023
Elections Daily	Likely D	February 5, 2024
CNalysis	Likely D	November 16, 2023

==== Polling ====
Poll source	Date(s) administered	Sample size	Margin of error	Chris Deluzio (D)	Rob Mercuri (R)	Undecided
Change Research (D)	September 16–23, 2024	495 (LV)	–	46%	42%	12%
Change Research (D)	August 10–17, 2024	543 (LV)	± 2.2%	48%	40%	12%

==== Results ====
Pennsylvania's 17th congressional district, 2024
Party	Candidate	Votes	%
Democratic	Chris Deluzio (incumbent)	242,838	53.9
Republican	Rob Mercuri	207,900	46.1
Total votes		450,738	100.0
Democratic hold			

==== By county ====
County	Chris Deluzio Democratic		Rob Mercuri Republican		Margin		Total votes cast
County	#	%	#	%	#	%	Total votes cast
Allegheny	202,423	56.79%	154,022	43.21%	48,401	15.58%	356,445
Beaver	40,415	42.86%	53,878	57.24%	−13,463	−14.48%	94,293
Totals	242,838	53.88%	207,900	46.12%	34,938	7.75%	450,738

== Notes ==
Partisan clients
