= Janelle Stelson =

American TV news anchor, politician (born 1960)

- Stelson in 2026

Member-elect of the U.S. House of Representatives from Pennsylvania's 10th district
- Assuming office January 3, 2027
- Succeeding: Scott Perry

Personal details
- Born: 1960 (age 65–66) Fairbanks, Alaska, U.S.
- Party: Republican (before 2023); Democratic (2023–present)
- Education: University of Puget Sound (BA)
- Website: Campaign website

Janelle Stelson (born 1960) is an American former television news anchor and politician who is the U.S. representative-elect for Pennsylvania's 10th congressional district. A member of the Democratic Party, Stelson defeated Republican incumbent Scott Perry in 2026, whom she had narrowly lost to in 2024.

She worked as a television journalist in Pennsylvania for more than three decades, including 26 years as an anchor at WGAL-TV in Lancaster.

== Early life and education ==
Stelson was born in Fairbanks, Alaska, and raised in Seattle with three younger sisters. Her father was a state trooper and teacher, while her mother worked as a receptionist at Puget Sound Naval Shipyard in Bremerton, Washington.

She earned a Bachelor of Arts degree in politics and government from the University of Puget Sound. She also studied international politics and German at the Austro-American Institute in Vienna, Austria.

== Broadcast journalism career ==
After graduating from the University of Puget Sound, Stelson worked as a speechwriter at the Embassy of Egypt in Washington, D.C. She later joined WHTM-TV, the local ABC affiliate in Harrisburg, Pennsylvania, where she worked as a general assignment reporter and weather anchor for three years. In 1985, she joined WPLG-TV, the ABC affiliate in Miami, Florida.

She later returned to Pennsylvania to join WHP-TV, the CBS affiliate in Harrisburg, where she anchored the 6 pm and 11 pm newscasts. She also worked with WITF-FM radio, hosted a statewide public television program, and was a segment anchor on the national PBS series Computer Chronicles.

In 1997, Stelson joined WGAL-TV, the NBC affiliate in Lancaster, Pennsylvania, where she co-anchored the station's 4, 5:30, 10, and 11 pm evening newscasts. During her time there, she reported from Kosovo while embedded with the Pennsylvania National Guard and covered the aftermath of the September 11 attacks at the World Trade Center in New York City. She won a Mid-Atlantic Emmy Award in 2016 and 2023, including the latter for co-anchoring for a smaller market evening newscast.

On September 14, 2023, Stelson announced near the end of News 8 at 5:30 that she would be leaving WGAL after nearly 40 years as a journalist, including 26 years at the station. Her final newscast aired the following day.

== U.S. House of Representatives campaigns ==
=== 2024 election ===
In 2024, Stelson ran for Congress as a Democrat in Pennsylvania's 10th district on a centrist platform and defeated five other candidates in the Democratic primary. Ahead of the campaign, she changed her voter registration from Republican to Democratic in February 2023. She said the Supreme Court's 2022 decision overturning Roe v. Wade contributed to her decision, explaining that she had originally registered with the party of her parents. She also said that her career in broadcast journalism, which required political neutrality, had given her little reason to reconsider her party affiliation earlier.

During the campaign, Stelson faced questions about her previous Republican registration and her residence outside the district. She said during a March primary debate that she would move into the district if she won the primary, but later said she would move after winning the general election. She was also scrutinized for comments made on-air about a business in Belgium where patrons could dine and drink in the company of cats. After her co-anchor noted that the idea was popularized in Asian countries, she replied: "Of course, because they're making tacos out of them." She later apologized for the comment, saying it was inappropriate and had occurred during a career spanning thousands of hours of live television.

Stelson faced Republican incumbent Scott Perry in the general election and lost by about 5,000 votes.

=== 2026 election ===
In July 2025, Stelson announced her candidacy for Pennsylvania's 10th congressional district in the 2026 election. The following month, she established residency and registered to vote at a rented home in Cumberland County within the district; she also continued to own her former home in Lancaster County. During the Democratic primary, her opponent, Dauphin County Commissioner Justin Douglas, criticized her for declining to participate in a candidate debate, which marked the first Democratic primary for the district since 2016 not to have a debate. Stelson defeated Douglas in the Democratic primary with 67.5% of the vote, and advanced to a rematch against incumbent Republican Scott Perry in the general election.

Governor Josh Shapiro and Lieutenant Governor Austin Davis both endorsed Stelson before the primary and the DCCC placed her into its "Red to Blue" program for its most competitive pick-up opportunities. Stelson had raised more than $8.69 million to Perry's $6.45 million and outside groups had by then spent over $15 million on the campaign.

Stelson defeated Scott Perry in the 2026 election.

== Political positions ==
Stelson supports updating immigration laws and has said that ICE should be held accountable for the deaths of U.S. citizens. She is opposed to the 2026 Iran War, believing tax dollars would be better spent on domestic issues to help the middle class. She is also against tariffs enacted by President Trump. Stelson criticized Perry for voting for the One Big Beautiful Bill Act, citing its cuts to Medicaid. She also called for giving Medicare broader authority to negotiate prescription drug prices. On data centers, she argued that developers should supply their own electricity rather than draw power from the existing grid.

== Personal life ==
Stelson lives in East Pennsboro Township in Cumberland County.

U.S. House of Representatives
Preceded by Scott Perry	Member of the U.S. House of Representatives from Pennsylvania's 10th congressional district Taking office 2027	Elect
