= 1868 =

1868 in various calendars
- Gregorian calendar: 1868; MDCCCLXVIII
- Ab urbe condita: 2621
- Armenian calendar: 1317; ԹՎ ՌՅԺԷ
- Assyrian calendar: 6618
- Baháʼí calendar: 24–25
- Balinese saka calendar: 1789–1790
- Bengali calendar: 1274–1275
- Berber calendar: 2818
- British Regnal year: 31 Vict. 1 – 32 Vict. 1
- Buddhist calendar: 2412
- Burmese calendar: 1230
- Byzantine calendar: 7376–7377
- Chinese calendar: 丁卯年 (Fire Rabbit); 4565 or 4358 — to — 戊辰年 (Earth Dragon); 4566 or 4359
- Coptic calendar: 1584–1585
- Discordian calendar: 3034
- Ethiopian calendar: 1860–1861
- Hebrew calendar: 5628–5629
- Hindu calendars
- Vikram Samvat: 1924–1925
- Shaka Samvat: 1789–1790
- Kali Yuga: 4968–4969
- Holocene calendar: 11868
- Igbo calendar: 868–869
- Iranian calendar: 1246–1247
- Islamic calendar: 1284–1285
- Japanese calendar: Keiō 4 / Meiji 1 (明治元年)
- Javanese calendar: 1796–1797
- Julian calendar: Gregorian minus 12 days
- Korean calendar: 4201
- Minguo calendar: 44 before ROC 民前44年
- Nanakshahi calendar: 400
- Thai solar calendar: 2410–2411
- Tibetan calendar: མེ་མོ་ཡོས་ལོ་ (female Fire-Hare); 1994 or 1613 or 841 — to — ས་ཕོ་འབྲུག་ལོ་ (male Earth-Dragon); 1995 or 1614 or 842

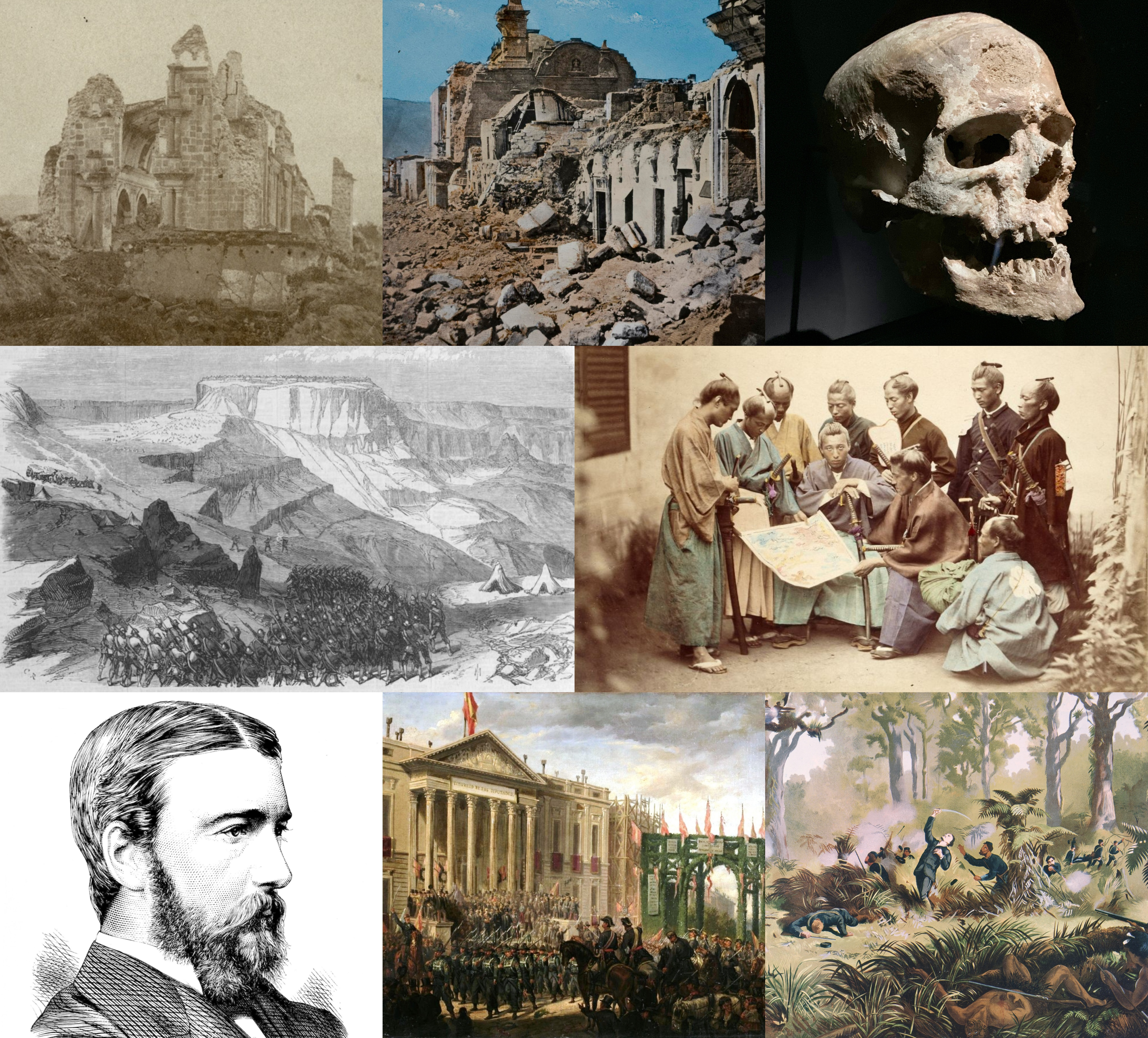
From top left, clockwise: A series of devastating earthquakes strike Ecuador (left) and southern Peru (centre), killing a culminative estimate of 95,000 people; the first identified skeletons of Cro-Magnons, the earliest modern humans to occupy Europe, are discovered in Dordogne in France; the Meiji Restoration occurs in Japan after the Tokugawa shogunate is defeated in the Boshin War; Māori general Tītokowaru wages an initially successful war against the British and the New Zealand colonial government in South Taranaki; the Spanish Glorious Revolution leads to the deposition and exile of Isabella II; Helium is named by English astronomer Norman Lockyer two months after contemporary Pierre Jannsen accidentally discovers it; the expensive British expedition to Abyssinia is successful in rescuing hostages of Emperor Tewodros II.

1868 (MDCCCLXVIII) was a leap year starting on Wednesday of the Gregorian calendar and a leap year starting on Monday of the Julian calendar, the 1868th year of the Common Era (CE) and Anno Domini (AD) designations, the 868th year of the 2nd millennium, the 68th year of the 19th century, and the 9th year of the 1860s decade. As of the start of 1868, the Gregorian calendar was 12 days ahead of the Julian calendar, which remained in localized use until 1923.

== Events ==
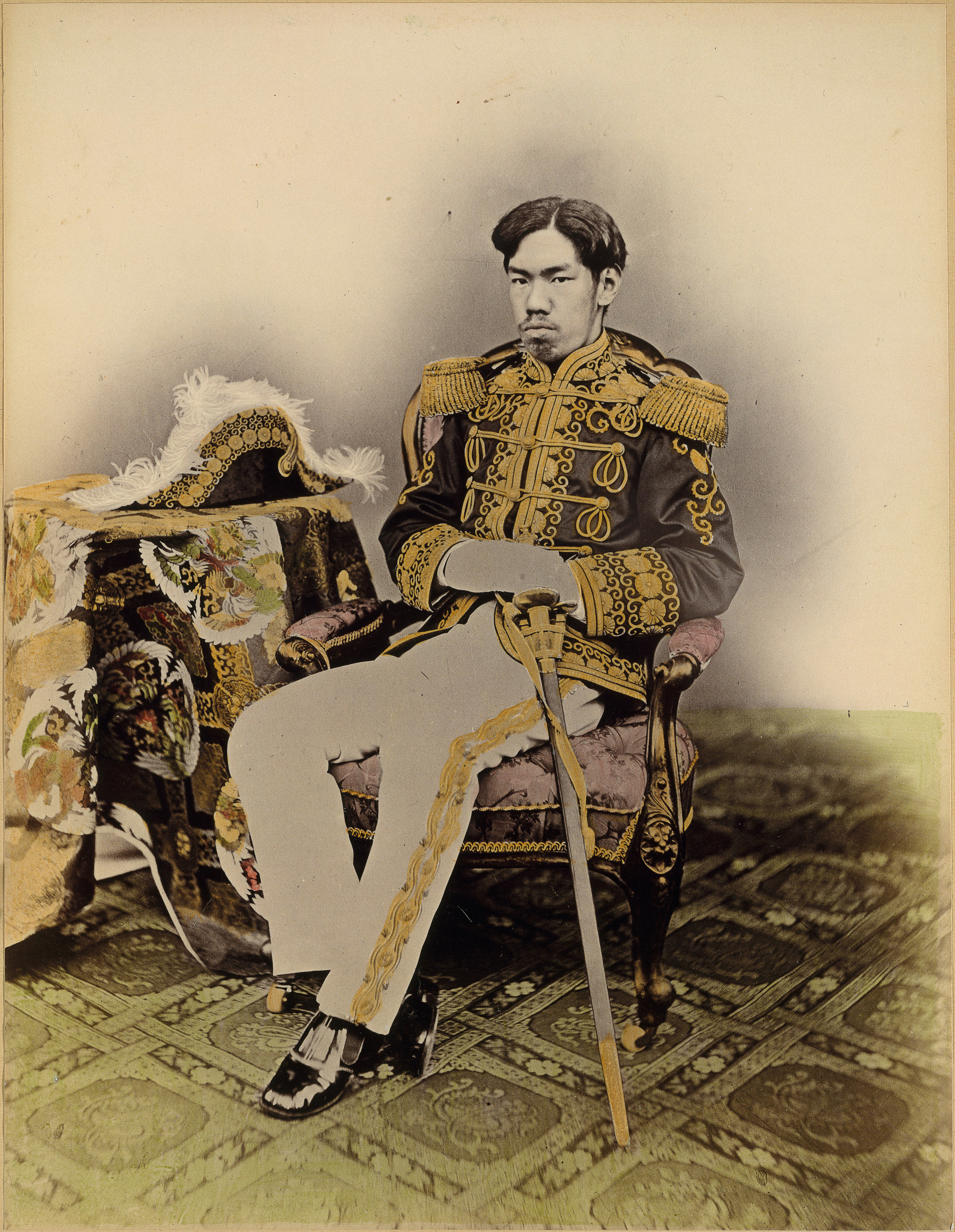
January 3: Emperor Meiji.

=== January ===
- January 2 – British Expedition to Abyssinia: Robert Napier leads an expedition to free captive British officials and missionaries.
- January 3 – The 15-year-old Mutsuhito, Emperor Meiji of Japan, declares the Meiji Restoration, his own restoration to full power, under the influence of supporters from the Chōshū and Satsuma Domains, and against the supporters of the Tokugawa shogunate, triggering the Boshin War.
- January 5 – Paraguayan War: Brazilian Army commander Luís Alves de Lima e Silva, Duke of Caxias, enters Asunción, Paraguay's capital. Some days later he declares the war is over. Nevertheless, Francisco Solano López, Paraguay's president, prepares guerrillas to fight in the countryside.
- January 7 – The Arkansas constitutional convention meets in Little Rock.
- January 9 – Penal transportation from Britain to Australia ends, with arrival of the convict ship Hougoumont in Western Australia, after an 89-day voyage from England. There are 62 Fenians among the transportees.
- January 10 – Shōgun Tokugawa Yoshinobu declares the emperor's declaration "illegal", and prepares to attack Kyoto.
- January 27–31 – Battle of Toba–Fushimi: forces of the Tokugawa shogunate and the allied pro-Imperial forces of the Chōshū, Satsuma and Tosa Domains clash near Fushimi, Kyoto, ending in a decisive victory for the Imperial forces (although in the January 28 naval Battle of Awa, the Shogunate is victorious against Satsuma).

=== February ===
- February 13 – The British War Office sanctions the formation of what becomes the Army Post Office Corps.
- February 16 – In New York City, the Jolly Corks organization is renamed the Benevolent and Protective Order of Elks (BPOE).
- February 19 – In the Passage of Humaitá, a Brazilian naval force succeeds in dashing past a Paraguayan fortress on the River Paraguay, considered by some the turning point in the Paraguayan War.
- February 24
  - Impeachment of Andrew Johnson: Three days after his action to dismiss United States Secretary of War Edwin M. Stanton, the United States House of Representatives votes 126–47 in favor of a resolution to impeach Andrew Johnson, President of the United States, the first of three Presidents to be impeached by the full House. Johnson is later acquitted by the United States Senate.
  - The first parade to have floats takes place at Mardi Gras in New Orleans.
- February
  - The Flying Foam massacre, a massacre of Indigenous Australians around Flying Foam Passage in Western Australia by white colonial settlers begins and lasts until May.
  - Foreign ministers meeting in Hyōgo are persuaded to recognise the restored Emperor Meiji of Japan, with promises that harbours will be open in accordance with international treaties.

=== March ===
- March 12
  - Alfred, Duke of Saxe-Coburg and Gotha, Duke of Edinburgh, is shot in the back in Sydney, Australia, at a fundraising event for the Sydney Sailors Home, by Irishman Henry James O'Farrell. The prince survives and quickly recovers; O'Farrell is executed on April 21, despite attempts by the prince to gain clemency for him.
  - Basutoland is proclaimed a British Protectorate, becoming independent in 1966 as Lesotho.
- March 23 – The University of California is founded in Oakland, California, when the Organic Act is signed into California law.
- March 24 – The Metropolitan Life Insurance Company is formed, in New York City.
- March 27 – The Lake Ontario Shore Railroad Company is organized in Oswego, New York.
- March –
  - French geologist Louis Lartet discovers the first identified skeletons of Cro-Magnon, the first early modern humans (early Homo sapiens sapiens), at Abri de Crô-Magnon, a rock shelter at Les Eyzies, Dordogne, France.
  - The first transnational women's organization, Association internationale des femmes, is founded.

=== April ===
- April 1 – The Hampton Normal and Agricultural Institute is established in Hampton, Virginia.
- April 7 – The Charter Oath, drawn up by his councilors, is promulgated at the enthronement of the Emperor Meiji of Japan, promising deliberative assemblies and an end to feudalism.
- April 9 – Emperor Tewodros II of Ethiopia massacres at least 197 of his own people at Magdala. These are prisoners incarcerated, for the most part, for very trivial offenses, and are killed for requesting bread and water.
- April 9–13 – Battle of Magdala: A British-Indian task force under Robert Napier inflicts 700 deaths and a crushing defeat on the army of Emperor Tewodros II; the British and Indians suffer 30 wounded, two of whom subsequently die. Tewodros commits suicide and Magdala is captured, ending the British Expedition to Abyssinia.
- April 11–July – Fall of Edo: The Japanese city surrenders to Emperor Meiji. Shōgun Tokugawa Yoshinobu submits to the Emperor.
- April 29 – General William Tecumseh Sherman brokers the Treaty of Fort Laramie, between the federal government of the United States and the Plains Indians.

=== May ===
- May 10–14 – Boshin War – Battle of Utsunomiya Castle, Japan: Forces of the Emperor Meiji resist the retreating troops of the Tokugawa shogunate.
- May 16, May 26 – President Andrew Johnson is twice acquitted during his impeachment trial, by one vote in the United States Senate.
- May 26 – Fenian bomber Michael Barrett becomes the last person publicly hanged in the United Kingdom.
- May 29 – The Parliament of the United Kingdom passes the Capital Punishment Amendment Act, thus ending public hanging.
- May 30 – Memorial Day is observed in the United States for the first time (it was proclaimed on May 5 by General John A. Logan).
- May 31
  - Thomas Spence declares himself president of the Republic of Manitobah in Canada; he soon alienates the locals.
  - The first popular bicycle race is held at Parc de Saint-Cloud, Paris.

=== June ===
- June 1 – The Treaty of Bosque Redondo is signed, allowing the Navajo to return to their lands in Arizona and New Mexico.
- June 2 – The first Trades Union Congress is held in Manchester, England.
- June 10 – Mihailo Obrenović, Prince of Serbia, is assassinated in Košutnjak, Belgrade.
- June 20 – Fort Fred Steele is established to protect what is at this time the western terminus of the Union Pacific Railway, near modern-day Sinclair, Wyoming.
- June – Tītokowaru's War breaks out in the South Taranaki District of New Zealand's North Island between the Ngāti Ruanui Māori tribe and the New Zealand Government.

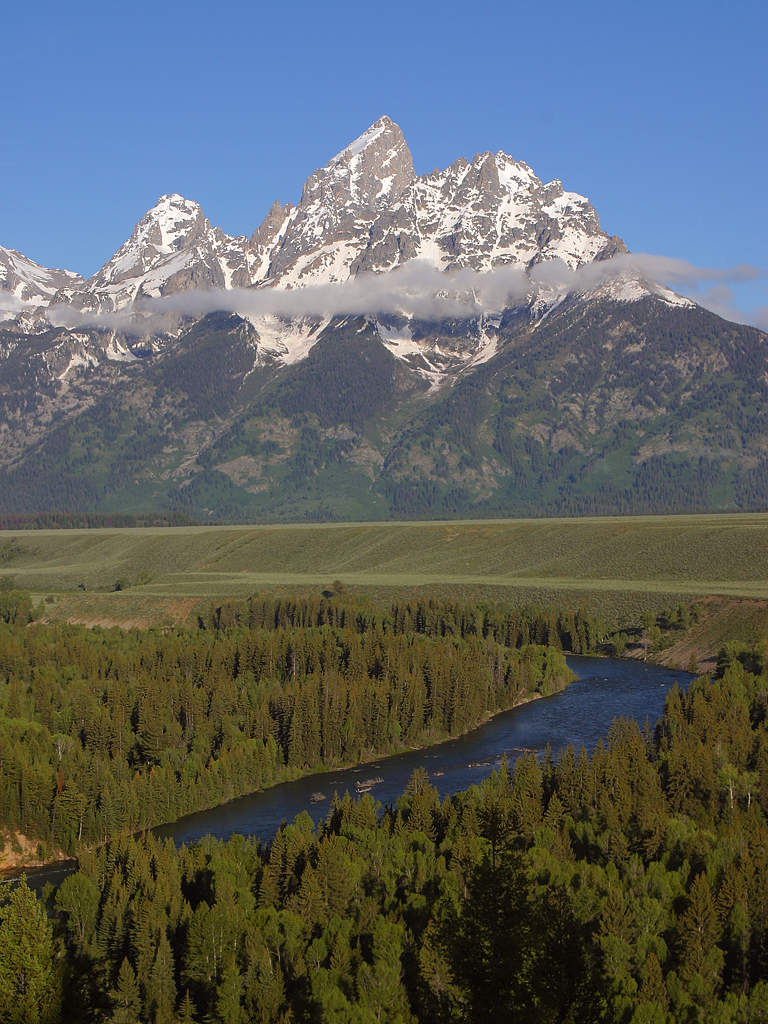
July 25: Wyoming Territory.

=== July ===
- July 1 – The cable-operated West Side and Yonkers Patent Railway in Manhattan becomes the first elevated railway in the United States.
- July 4 – Battle of Ueno: Imperial Japanese troops defeat the Shōgitai (elite forces remaining loyal to the shōgun).
- July 5 – Preacher William Booth establishes the Christian Mission, predecessor of The Salvation Army, in the East End of London.
- July 9 – The Fourteenth Amendment to the United States Constitution is ratified.
- July 18 – The Navajo people begin their long march home.
- July 25
  - Wyoming becomes a United States territory.
  - Paraguayan War: The Allies, in an amphibious operation, capture the fortress of Humaitá.
- July 27 – The United States Expatriation Act ("An Act concerning the Rights of American Citizens in foreign States") is adopted.
- July 28 – The Fourteenth Amendment to the United States Constitution is adopted, including the Citizenship Clause and the Equal Protection Clause, legally, if not actually, guaranteeing African Americans full citizenship and equal protection, and all persons in the United States due process of law.

=== August ===
- August 13 – The 8.5–9.0 M_{w} Arica earthquake strikes southern Peru, with a maximum Mercalli intensity of XI (Extreme), causing 25,000+ deaths and a destructive basin-wide tsunami, that affects Hawaii and New Zealand.
- August 18 – The element later named as helium is first detected in the spectrum of the Sun's chromosphere, by French astronomer Jules Janssen, during a total eclipse in Guntur, British India, but is assumed to be sodium.
- August 20 – Abergele rail disaster in Wales: An Irish Mail passenger train collides with 4 cargo trucks loaded with paraffin oil (more akin to modern kerosine); 33 are killed (the first major train disaster in Britain).
- August 22 – The Yangzhou riot in China targets a station of the China Inland Mission, and nearly leads to war between Britain and China.

=== September ===
- September 3 – Emperor Meiji of Japan announces that the name of the city of Edo is to be changed to Tokyo.
- September 7 – Tītokowaru's War: Māori leader Tītokowaru defeats a New Zealand military force at Te Ngutu o Te Manu, North Island.
- September 18 – The University of the South holds its first convocation in Sewanee, Tennessee.
- September 19 - Glorious Revolution in Spain begins against Queen Isabella II
- September 23 – Grito de Lares: Rebels (some 400–600 led by Ramón Emeterio Betances) in the town of Lares declare Puerto Rico independent; the local militia easily defeats them a week later.
- September 24 – Croatian–Hungarian Settlement (Croatian: Hrvatsko-ugarska nagodba, Hungarian: Horvát–magyar kiegyezés, German: Kroatisch-Ungarischer Ausgleich) is concluded, governing Croatia's political status in the Hungarian-ruled part of Austria-Hungary until 1918.
- September 28 – The Opelousas massacre, one of the bloodiest massacres of the Reconstruction era in the United States.
- September – Glorious Revolution: Queen Isabella II of Spain is effectively deposed after Battle of Alcolea (1868) and sent into exile; she formally abdicates on June 25, 1870.

=== October ===
- October 1 – Chulalongkorn starts to rule in Siam.
- October 6 – The City of New York grants Mount Sinai Hospital a 99-year lease for a property on Lexington Avenue and 66th Street, for the sum of $1.00.
- October 10 – Carlos Manuel de Céspedes declares a revolt against Spanish rule in Cuba, in an event known as El Grito de Yara or the Ten Years' War, initiating a war that lasts ten years (Cuba ultimately loses the war at a cost of 400,000 lives and widespread destruction).
- October 20
  - English astronomer Norman Lockyer observes and names the D_{3} Fraunhofer line in the solar spectrum, and concludes that it is caused by a hitherto unidentified element, which he later names helium.
  - Pedro Figueredo creates the Cuban national anthem, El Himno de Bayamo.
- October 23 – The current Japanese era name is changed to the Meiji period. The Edo period ends.
- October 25 – The Uspenski Cathedral, designed by Aleksey Gornostayev, is inaugurated in Helsinki, Finland.
- October 28 – Thomas Edison applies for his first patent, the electric vote recorder.

=== November ===
- November 2 – Time zone: New Zealand officially adopts a standard time, to be observed nationally.
- November 3 – 1868 United States presidential election: Republican Ulysses S. Grant defeats Democrat Horatio Seymour.

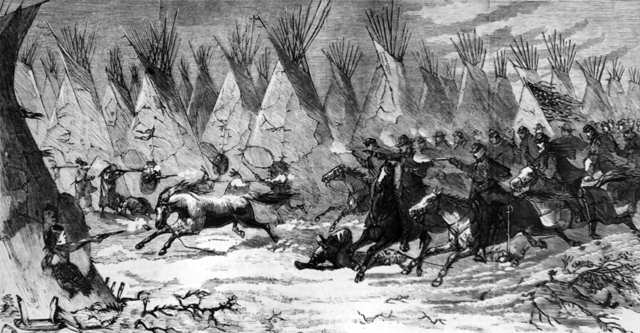
November 27: Battle of Washita River.

- November 7 – The Battle of Moturoa, New Zealand, ends in a British defeat, due to an underestimate of Tītokowaru and his fortifications. There are heavy casualties for the colonial army and light casualties for the Māori defenders.
- November 27 – American Indian Wars – Battle of Washita River: In the early morning, United States Army Lieutenant Colonel George Armstrong Custer leads an attack on a band of Cheyenne living on reservation land with Chief Black Kettle, killing 103 Cheyenne.

=== December ===
- December 4
  - Battle of Hakodate begins in Japan.
  - Thomas Humber invented the safety bicycle.
- December 6 – Paraguayan War – Battle of Ytororó or Itororó: Field-Marshal Luís Alves de Lima e Silva, Duke of Caxias, leads 13,000 Brazilian troops against a Paraguayan fortified position of 5,000 troops.
- December 9 – The world's first traffic signal lights are installed at the junction of Great George Street and Bridge Street in the London Borough of Westminster.
- December 24 – The Greek Presidential Guard is established as the royal escort by King George I.
- December 25 – U.S. President Andrew Johnson grants unconditional pardon to all Civil War rebels.

=== Date unknown ===
- Louis Arthur Ducos du Hauron patents methods of color photography.
- Thomas Henry Huxley discovers what he thinks is primordial matter and names it bathybius haeckelii (he admits his mistake in 1871).
- The Académie Julian, a major art school in Paris, France, that admits women, is established.
- Brisbane Grammar School is founded, providing the opportunity for secondary education for the first time in the colony of Brisbane in Australia.
- Maryland School for the Deaf is established.
- The Dortmunder Actien Brauerei is founded in Germany.
- Herrenhäuser Brewery is established in Hanover, Germany.
- Tata Group is founded by Jamsetji Tata as a trading company in India.
- Scottish merchant Thomas Blake Glover develops Japan's first coal mine on Hashima Island.
- The Roman Catholic Diocese of Tucson is established as the Apostolic Vicariate of Arizona in 1868, taking its territory from the former Diocese of Santa Fe. The Diocese of Tucson is canonically erected on May 8, 1897.
- The population of Japan reaches c. 30 million.

== Births ==
=== January–March ===
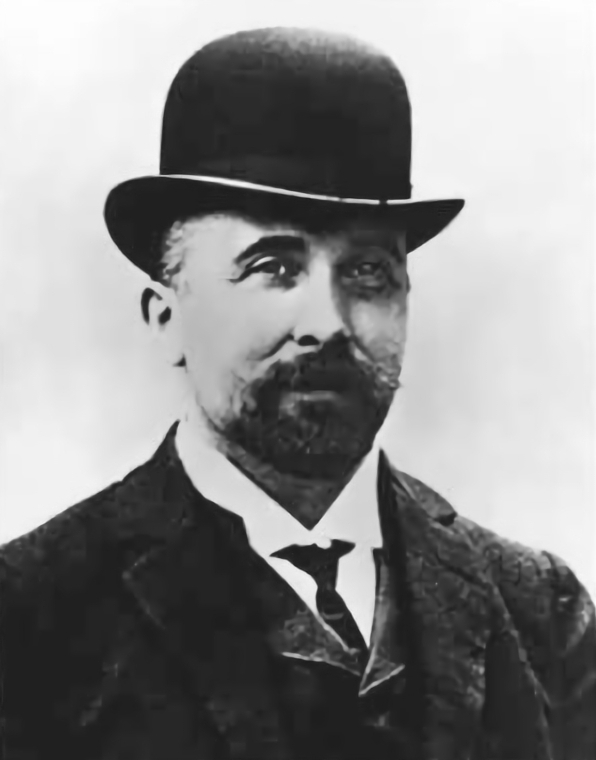
Felix Hoffmann

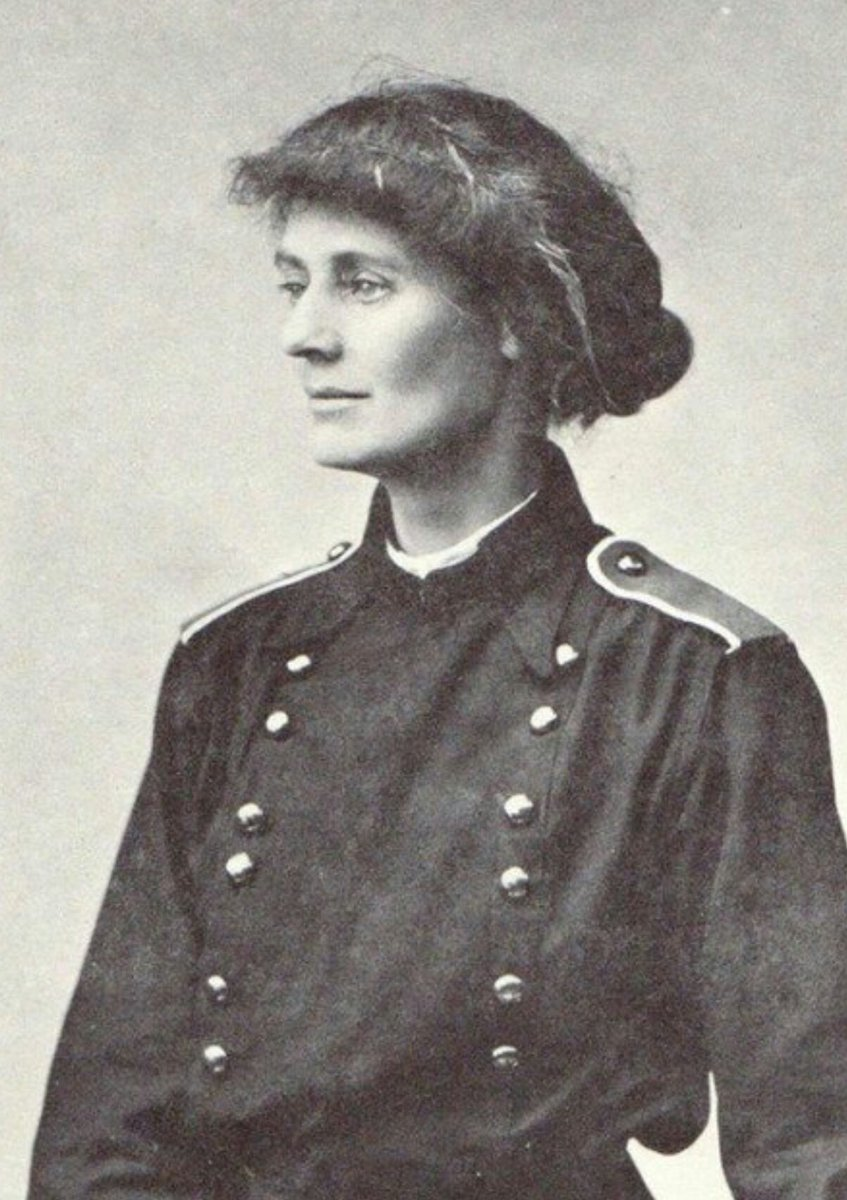
Countess Markiewicz

- January 1 – Snitz Edwards, Hungarian-born actor (d. 1937)
- January 6 – Vittorio Monti, Italian composer (d. 1922)
- January 9 – S. P. L. Sørensen, Danish chemist (d. 1939)
- January 11 – Cai Yuanpei, Chinese educator (d. 1940)
- January 15 – Otto von Lossow, Bavarian and German general (d. 1938)
- January 18 – Kantarō Suzuki, 29th Prime Minister of Japan (d. 1948)
- January 21 – Felix Hoffmann, German chemist (d. 1946)
- January 31 – Theodore William Richards, American chemist, Nobel Prize laureate (d. 1928)
- February 4 – Constance Markievicz, née Gore-Booth, Irish politician (d. 1927)
- February 5 – Maxine Elliott, American actress (d. 1940)
- February 12 – William Faversham, English actor (d. 1940)
- February 16 – Edward S. Curtis, American photographer, ethnologist, and film director (d. 1952)
- February 23 – W. E. B. Du Bois, African American civil rights leader (d. 1963)
- February 25
  - Constantin Dumitrescu, Romanian general (d. 1935)
  - Matsumura Tatsuo, Japanese admiral (d. 1932)
- February 26 – Venceslau Brás, Brazilian president (d. 1966)
- February 27 – Georges Brunet, French anarchist (d. 20th century)
- March 1
  - Sophie, Duchess of Hohenberg, née Countess Sophie Chotek von Wognin, Bohemian morganatic wife of Archduke Franz Ferdinand of Austria (k. 1914)
  - Adolf von Trotha, German admiral (d. 1940)
- March 14 – Emily Murphy, Canadian woman's rights activist (d. 1933)
- March 22 – Robert Andrews Millikan, American physicist, Nobel Prize laureate (d. 1953)
- March 25 – Bill Lockwood, English cricketer (d. 1932)
- March 28 – Maxim Gorky, Russian author (d. 1936)
- March 29 – Joseph Cawthorn, American actor (d. 1949)

=== April–June ===
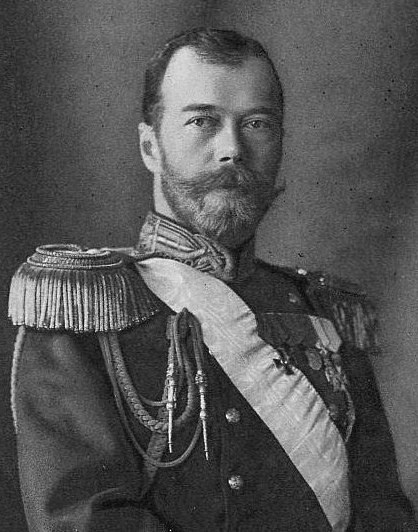
Nicholas II

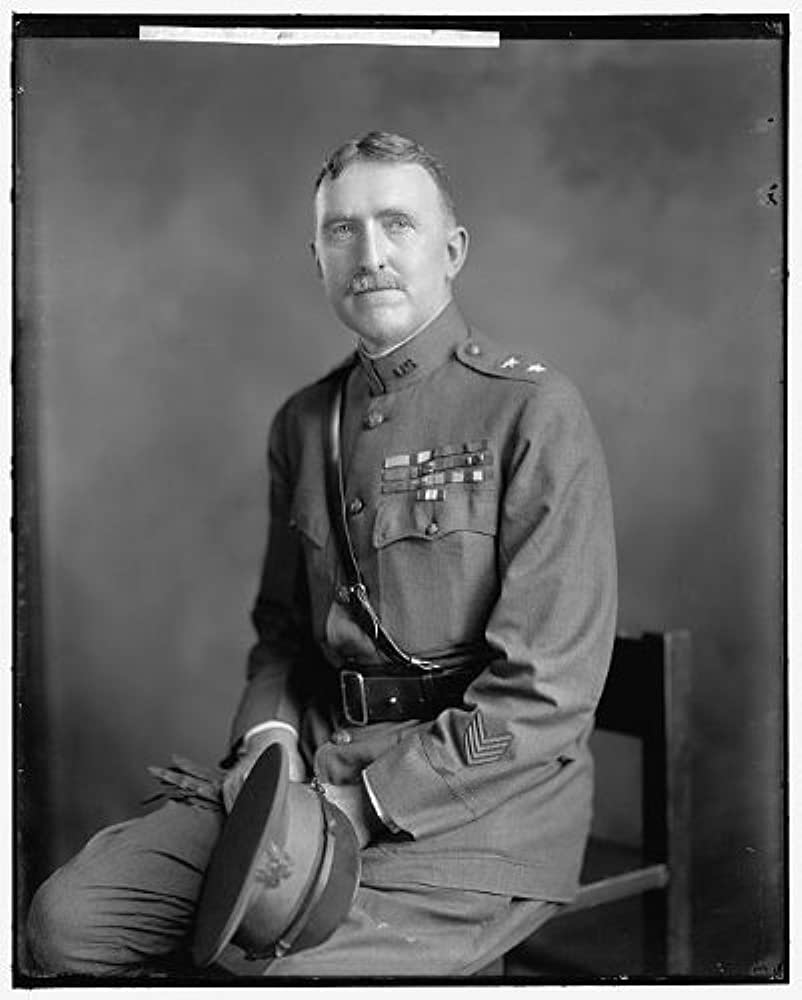
John L. Hines

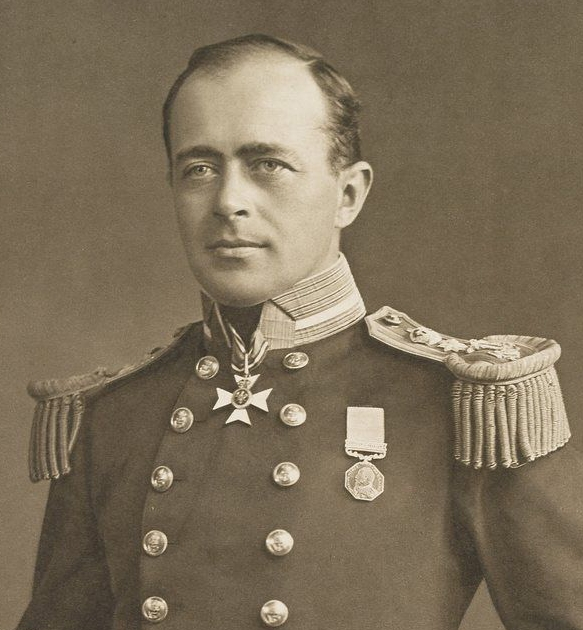
Robert Falcon Scott

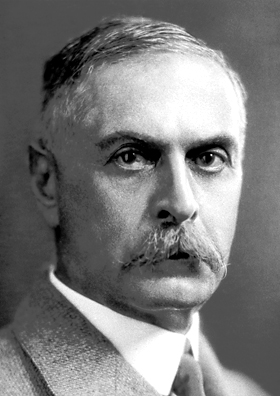
Karl Landsteiner

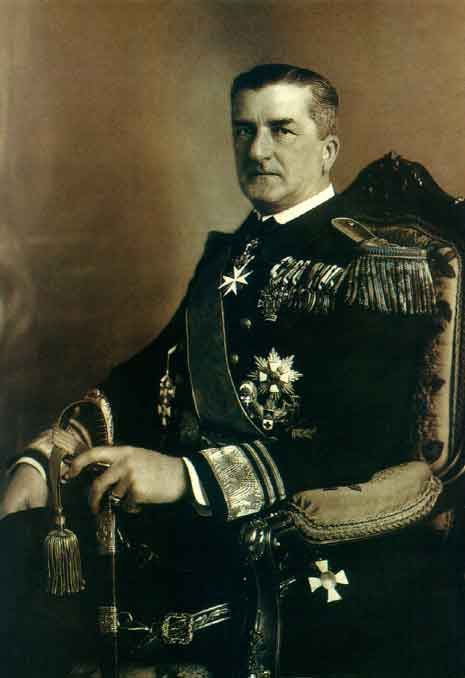
Miklós Horthy

- April 1 – Edmond Rostand, French poet and playwright (d. 1918)
- April 10 – George Arliss, English actor (d. 1946)
- April 12 – Akiyama Saneyuki, Japanese admiral (d. 1918)
- April 17 – Zdeňka Wiedermannová-Motyčková, Moravian pioneer of female education (d. 1915)
- April 25
  - John Moisant, American aviator (d. 1910)
  - Willie Maley, Scottish football player and manager (d. 1958)
- May 6 – Gaston Leroux, French writer (d. 1927)
- May 12 – Al Shean, German-born actor (d. 1949)
- May 18 (O. S. May 6) – Nicholas II, Emperor of Russia (d. 1918)
- May 21 – John L. Hines, American general, Chief of Staff of the U.S. Army (d. 1968)
- May 29 – Abdülmecid II, last Caliph of the Ottoman Empire (d. 1944)
- June – Fusajiro Yamauchi, Japanese entrepreneur and founder of Nintendo (d. 1929 or 1940)
- June 5 – James Connolly, Irish-Scots socialist (d. 1916)
- June 6 – Robert Falcon Scott, English Antarctic explorer (d. 1912)
- June 7
  - Charles Rennie Mackintosh, Scottish architect (d. 1928)
  - John Sealy Townsend, Irish mathematical physicist (d. 1957)
- June 14
  - Anna B. Eckstein, German peace campaigner (d. 1947)
  - Karl Landsteiner, Austrian biologist and physician, recipient of the Nobel Prize in Physiology or Medicine (d. 1943)
- June 21 – Edward Chaytor, New Zealand general (d. 1939)

=== July–September ===
- July 2 – Traian Moșoiu, Romanian general and politician (d. 1932)
- July 4 – Henrietta Swan Leavitt, American astronomer (d. 1921)
- July 12 – Stefan George, German poet (d. 1933)
- July 14 – Gertrude Bell, English archaeologist, writer, spy and administrator (d. 1926)
- July 15 – Nobuyoshi Mutō, Japanese field marshal and ambassador (d. 1933)
- July 17 – Mikhail Bakhirev, Russian admiral (d. 1920)
- July 19 – Florence Foster Jenkins, American socialite and amateur operatic soprano (d. 1944)
- July 20 – Patriarch Miron of Romania, 38th Prime Minister of Romania (d. 1939)
- July 24 – Princess Srivilailaksana The Princess of Suphanburi daughter of King Chulalongkorn of Siam and Chao Chom Manda Pae Bunnag (d.1904)
- July 28 – Theodor Wulf, German physicist and Jesuit (d. 1946)
- August 5 – Oskar Merikanto, Finnish composer (d. 1924)
- August 6 – Paul Claudel, French poet, dramatist and diplomat (d. 1955)
- August 7
  - Oo Zun, Burmese social worker and Buddhist nun (d. 1944)
  - Martin Wetzer, Finnish general (d. 1954)
- August 10 – Hugo Eckener, German dirigible engineer, Commander of Graf Zeppelin I (d. 1954)
- August 23 – Edgar Lee Masters, American poet, biographer and dramatist (d. 1950)
- August 26 – Charles Stewart, Premier of Alberta (d. 1946)
- September 1 – Henri Bourassa, Canadian politician and publisher (d. 1952)
- September 4 – Rudolf Reschreiter, Bavarian Painter
- September 6 – Heinrich Häberlin, Swiss politician, member of the Federal Council (d. 1947)
- September 17 – James Alexander Calder, Canadian politician (d. 1956)
- September 22 – John T. Raulston, American state judge (Scopes Monkey Trial) (d. 1956)

=== October–December ===
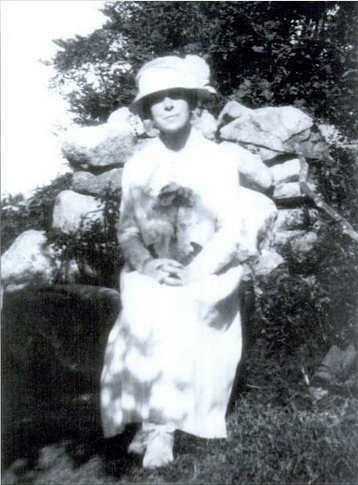
Mary Brewster Hazelton

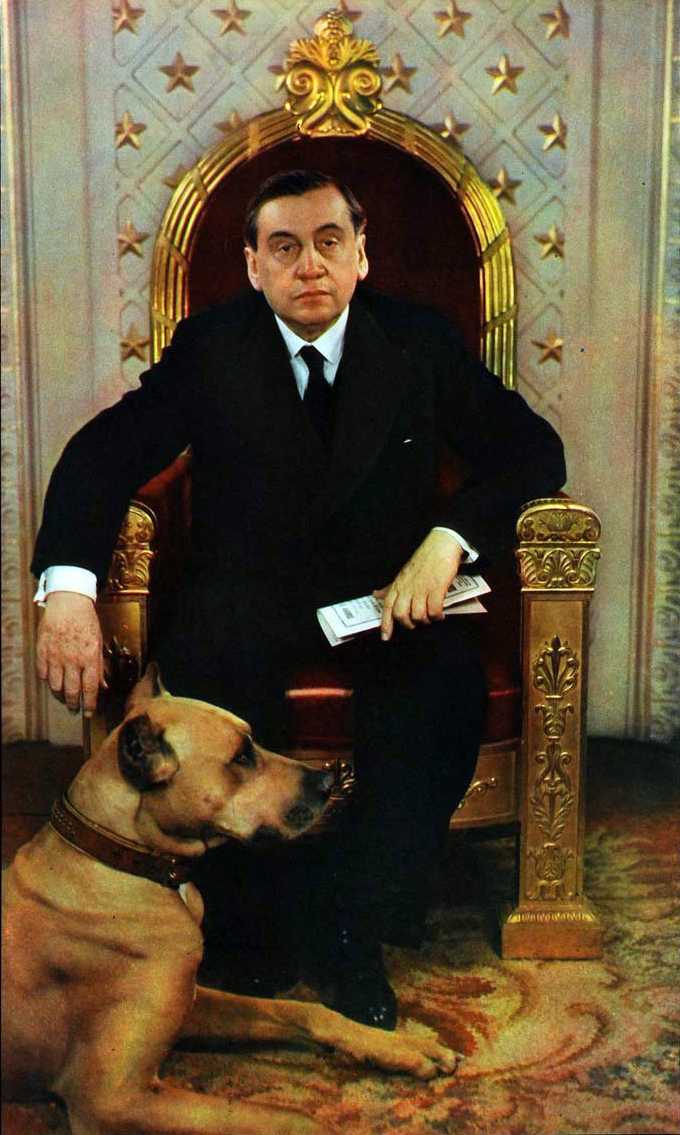
Arturo Alessandri

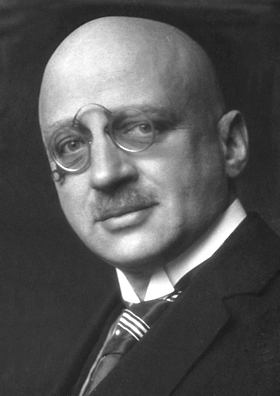
Fritz Haber

- October 4 – Marcelo Torcuato de Alvear, President of Argentina (d. 1942)
- October 15 – J. B. Johnson, American attorney and politician (d. 1940)
- October 21 – Ernest Swinton, British Army general (d. 1951)
- October 24 – Alexandra David-Néel, French explorer (d. 1969)
- October 30 – António Cabreira, Portuguese polygraph (d. 1953)
- November 7 – Delfim Moreira, Brazilian president (d. 1920)
- November 8 – Felix Hausdorff, German mathematician (d. 1942)
- November 9 – Marie Dressler, Canadian actress (d. 1934)
- November 10 – Gichin Funakoshi, Japanese founder of Shotokan karate, "father of modern karate" (d. 1957)
- November 17 – Korbinian Brodmann, German neurologist (d. 1918)
- November 23 – Mary Brewster Hazelton, American portrait painter (d. 1953)
- December 5 – Arnold Sommerfeld, German theoretical physicist (d. 1951)
- December 9 – Fritz Haber, German chemist, Nobel Prize laureate (d. 1934)
- December 19 – Eleanor H. Porter, American novelist (d. 1920)
- December 20 – Arturo Alessandri, Chilean statesman, 3-Time President of Chile (d. 1950)
- December 21 – George W. Fuller, American sanitation engineer (d. 1934)
- December 22 – Jaan Tõnisson, 2nd Prime Minister of Estonia (d. 1941?)
- December 25 – Eugenie Besserer, American silent film actress (d. 1934)
- probable – Scott Joplin, African American ragtime composer and pianist (d. 1917)

== Deaths ==
=== January–June ===
- January 20 – Damien Marchesseault, 7th Mayor of Los Angeles (suicide) (b. 1818)
- January 23 – János Erdélyi, Hungarian poet and ethnographer (b. 1814)
- January 28 – Adalbert Stifter, Austrian writer (b. 1805)
- February 8 – Lai Wenguang, Chinese leader of the Taiping Rebellion and Nien Rebellion (b. 1827)
- February 10 – Sir David Brewster, Scottish physicist (b. 1781)
- February 11 – Léon Foucault, French physicist (b. 1819)
- February 19 – Venancio Flores, Uruguayan general and president of Uruguay (b. 1808)
- February 29 – King Ludwig I of Bavaria (b. 1786)
- March 4 – Jesse Chisholm, American pioneer (b. 1805)
- March 19 – Philipp von Stadion und Thannhausen, Austrian field marshal (b. 1799)
- March 28 – James Brudenell, 7th Earl of Cardigan, British military leader (b. 1797)
- April 3 – Franz Berwald, Swedish composer (b. 1796)
- April 7 – Thomas D'Arcy McGee, Canadian father of confederation (assassinated) (b. 1825)
- April 12 – James Gascoyne-Cecil, 2nd Marquess of Salisbury, British politician and peer (b. 1791)
- April 13 – Emperor Theodore or Tewodros II of Ethiopia by suicide (b. 1818)
- April 21 – Henry O'Farrell, Irish-Australian criminal (executed) (b. 1833)
- May 7 – Henry Brougham, 1st Baron Brougham and Vaux, Lord High Chancellor of Great Britain (b. 1778)
- May 10 – Henry Bennett, American politician (b. 1808)

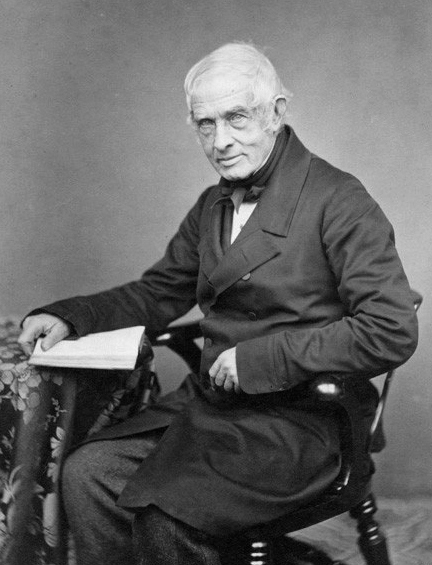
John Crawfurd

- May 11 – John Crawfurd, Scottish physician, colonial administrator, diplomat and author, last British Resident of Singapore (b. 1783)
- May 17 – Isami Kondo, Commander of the Shinsengumi (b. 1834)
- May 22 – Julius Plücker, German mathematician and physicist (b. 1801)
- May 23 – Kit Carson, American trapper, scout, and Indian agent (b. 1809)
- June 1 – James Buchanan, 15th President of the United States (b. 1791)
- June 10 – Princess Anka Obrenović, Serbian princess (b. 1821)
- June 22 – Heber C. Kimball, Latter Day Saint leader (b. 1801)
- June 29 – Sir John Lillie, British army officer, entrepreneur and inventor (b. 1790)

=== July–December ===
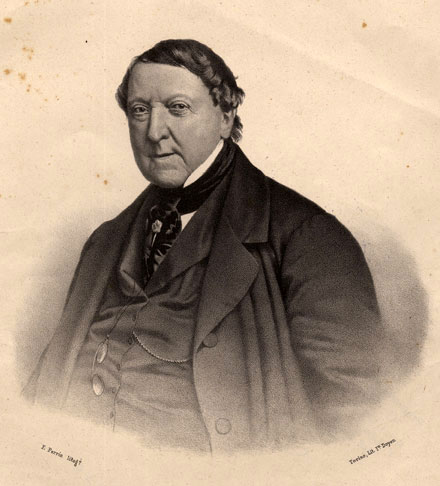
Gioachino Rossini

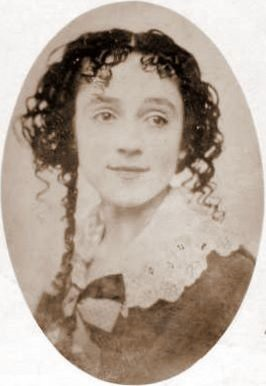
Adah Isaacs Menken

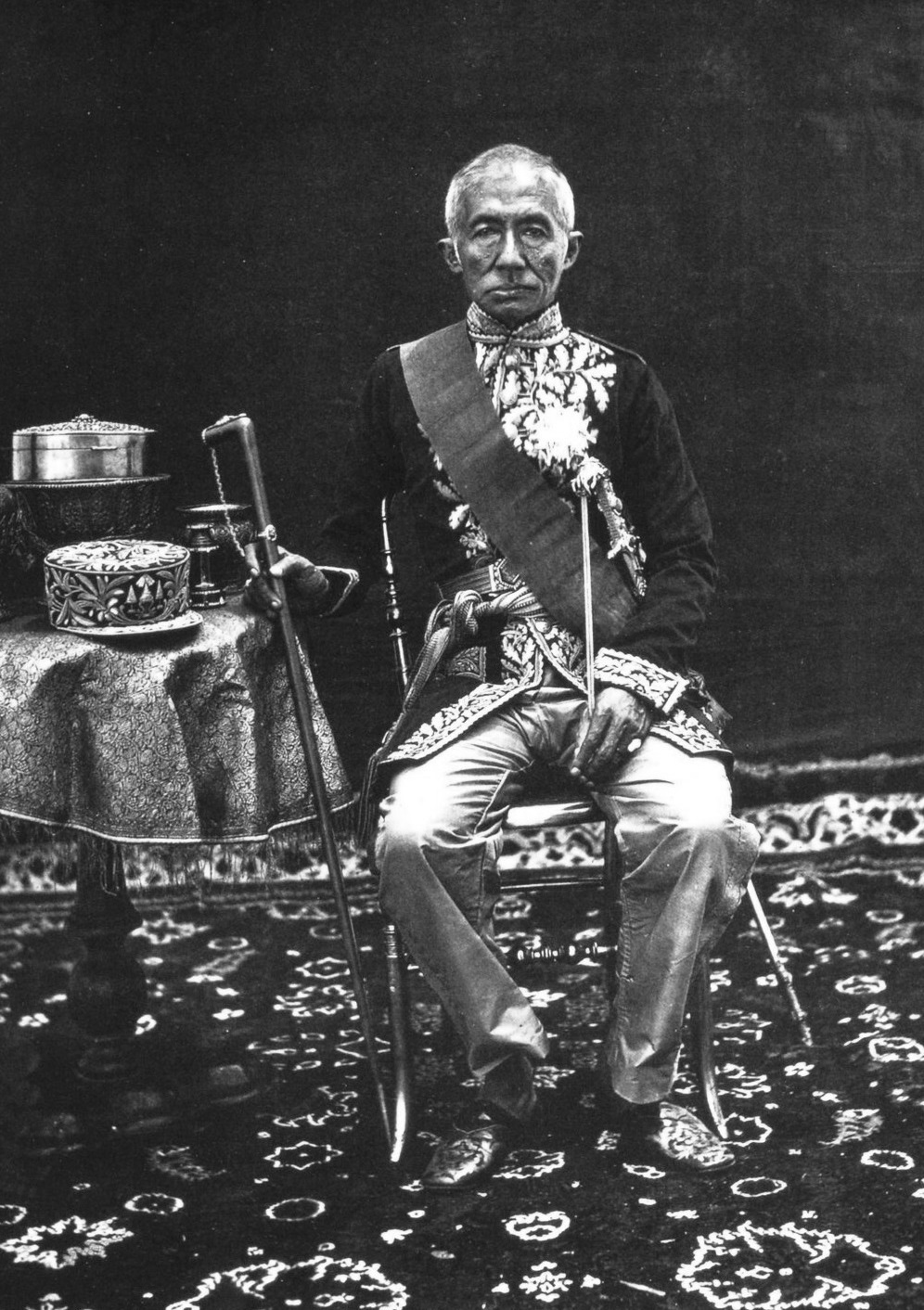
Mongkut

- July 6 – Harada Sanosuke, Shinsengumi Captain (b. 1840)
- July 19 – Okita Sōji, Shinsengumi Captain (b. 1842 or 1844)
- July 21 – William Bland, Australian politician (b. 1789)
- July 26 – Robert Rolfe, 1st Baron Cranworth, English Lord High Chancellor of Great Britain (b. 1791)
- July 29 – John Elliotson, English physician (b. 1791)
- August 3 – Edward Welch, Welsh architect (b. 1806)
- August 7 – Pedro de Ampudia, Mexican General (b. 1805)
- August 10 – Adah Isaacs Menken, American actress (b. 1835)
- August 11 – Thaddeus Stevens, American politician (b. 1792)
- August 25 – Charlotte Birch-Pfeiffer, German actress, writer and theater director (b. 1799)
- August 29 – Christian Friedrich Schönbein, German chemist (b. 1799)
- September 1 – Ferenc Gyulay, Hungarian nobleman, general and governor (b. 1799)
- September 7 – Gustavus von Tempsky, Prussian adventurer, artist, and soldier (b. 1828)
- September 9 – Mzilikazi, first king of Mthwakazi (b. c.1790)
- September 11 – Maria James, Welsh-born American poet (b. 1793)
- September 19 – William Sprague, American minister and politician from Michigan (b. 1809)
- September 26 – August Ferdinand Möbius, German mathematician and astronomer (b. 1790)
- October 1 – Mongkut (Rama IV), King of Siam (Thailand) (b. 1804)
- October 9 – Howell Cobb, American politician (b. 1815)
- October 17 – Laura Secord, Canadian patriot (b. 1775)
- October 27 – Charles Longley, Archbishop of Canterbury (b. 1794)
- November 13 – Gioachino Rossini, Italian composer (b. 1792)
- November 15 – James Mayer de Rothschild, German-born banker (b. 1792)
- November 27 – Chief Black Kettle, Southern Cheyenne Peace Chief, Survivor of Sand Creek massacre (b. 1803)
- December 6 – August Schleicher, German linguist (b. 1821)
- December 23 – Sir Herbert Edwardes, British army general and colonial administrator (b. 1819)
- December 25 – Linus Yale, Jr., American inventor (b. 1821)
- December 31 – Cyrus Kingsbury, American missionary and Choctaw linguist (b.1786)
