= Karen Murphy =

Karen Murphy may refer to:

- Karen Murphy (bowls) (born 1974), Australian lawn bowler
- Karen Murphy (producer), American film producer
- Karen Murphy (Pennsylvania nurse), Pennsylvania Secretary of Health
- Karen Murphy, a character in the 2011 film Abduction
