= Paul Azan =

French general and author (1874–1951)

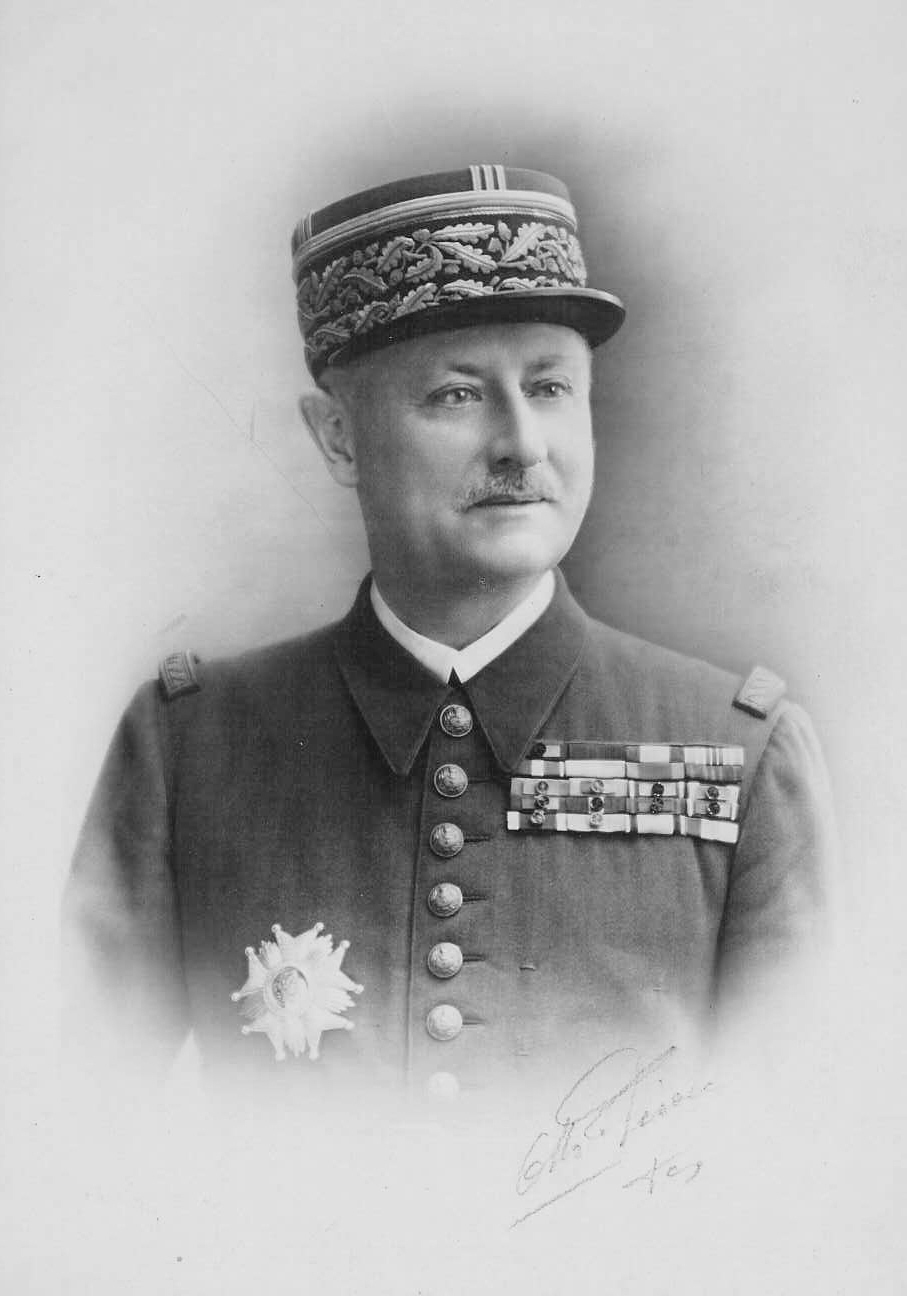
- General Azan in 1936
- Born: Paul Jean Louis Azan; 22 January 1874; Besançon, France
- Died: 14 August 1951 (aged 77); Lons-le-Saunier, France
- Military career
- Allegiance: France
- Branch: French Army
- Service years: 1902–1936
- Rank: Général de division
- Conflicts: French conquest of Morocco; World War I; Rif War
- Awards: Great Officer of the Legion of Honor; Croix de guerre 1914–1918; Croix de guerre des Théâtres d'opérations extérieures
- Other work: Author, historian

Paul Jean Louis Azan (French pronunciation: [pɔl azɑ̃]; 22 January 1874 – 14 August 1951) was a French general and author. He is remembered for his missions to the United States during World War I and his French historical and military writings which examined and celebrated French colonial rule in North Africa.

== Colonial North Africa ==
A graduate of the Saint-Cyr military academy, Paul Azan served in the 2nd régiment de zouaves in colonial Algeria along the Moroccan border, prior to its conquest by France. Later receiving a doctorate in literature, his thesis and first book Hannibal dans les Alpes brought him attention as a military historian and writer on colonial North Africa.

In 1902 he was transferred to the Army's Historical Service. There he authored a number of works on the "Algeria Question", how France might best assimilate and pacify the colonized population of North Africa. His works argued against the "Assimilationist" French policy, arguing that North African Muslims could not become full French citizens. His most notable work on the subject was 1905's "Sidi-Brahim", on the Algerian leader during the period of early colonialism in the 1840s.

After serving in the historical mission to Spain, now Captain Azan returned to North Africa, following interventions which culminated in the 1911 French conquest of Morocco, about which he authored several works, and serving under General Lyautey. He took part as an officer in the campaign against the Beni Snassen and the 1908 Fez Crisis expedition of General Albert d'Amade.

== World War I ==
Prior to the First World War, Azan was assigned the French home garrison at Autun. At the outbreak of war, Azan was reassigned to the Army High Command (état-major d'armée), and then given command of company of infantry in the 20th Corps.

Wounded first at Yser in Belgium, he was soon made chef de bataillon and was again wounded — this time more seriously — during the Artois offensive of May 1915. Following his recovery Azan was made a military instructor in the VIth Army under General Fayolle, the Mangin.

Promoted to Lieutenant-Colonel, Azan was made Chief of the Information Mission to the United States in the spring of 1917. While there he received much attention as instructor of the Harvard University officers training unit. Translated to English, his The War of positions and The Warfare of to day received much acclaim in the United States.

== Later career ==
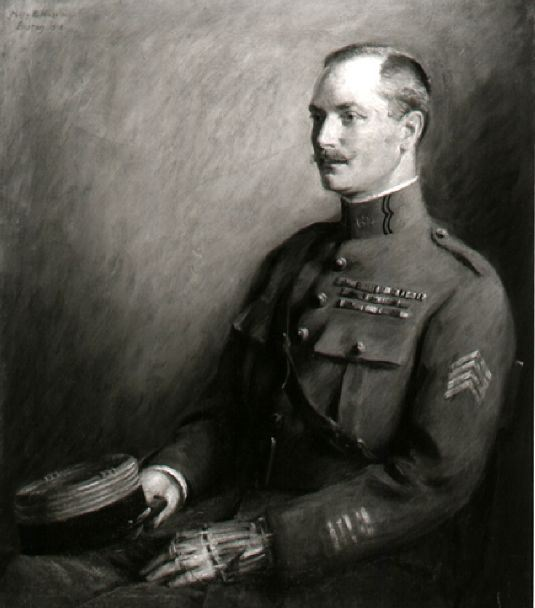
Paul Azan (1918) by Mary Brewster Hazelton

Following the 1918 Armistice, Azan was made chief of staff to General Franchet d’Esperey in Constantinople and Thrace, then assigned again to General Nivelle's mission to the United States.

Returning to North Africa, Colonel Azan commanded the 6th Regiment of the Tirailleurs Algérien at Tlemcen. There he wrote his history of Lyautey's earlier expedition and a biography of Algerian resistance leader, Abd el-Kader. He also commanded troops in the suppression of the Abd el-Krim's revolt against French occupation in the Rif War. In the late 1920s, following an assignment teaching at the Centre des hautes études militaires in Paris, Azan was interim commander of the 1st Infantry Brigade at Tunis and commanded the suppression a series of anti-colonial riots. Promoted to Général de brigade in 1928 General Azan was made head of the "Service historique de l'armée". AsGénéral de division he was head of military forces in French Tunisia from 1933 to 1936.

Two months prior to the German occupation in the Second World War, the retired Azan was briefly named Général de corps d'armée, and in 1944 was honored by the Académie Française. He died in 1951.

== Decorations ==
- Légion d'honneur: Chevalier (1914), officier (1915), commandeur (1926), grand officier (1935).
- Croix de guerre 1914-1918 with 2 palmes.
- Croix de guerre des Théâtres d'opérations extérieures with 1 palme.
- Médaille interalliée de la Victoire.
- Colonial Medal with agrafe de vermeil "Maroc 1925-1926".
- Médaille commémorative du Maroc (1909) with agrafes "Casablanca" "Oudjda".
- Médaille commémorative de la guerre 1914–1918
- Italy: Officer of the Order of la Couronne.
- United Kingdom: Distinguished Service Order.
- Tunisia: Officier (1905), grand officier (1929) of Nichan Iftikhar.
- Morocco: Officier du Ouissam Hafidien (1913).

== Selected works ==
- Paul Azan. Annibal dans les Alpes : Oran : imp. de D. Heintz, 1902.
- _. Sidi-Brahim, Publication: Récits d'Afrique, Paris : Charles-Lavauzelle, 1907.
- _. L'Émir Abd ʻel Kader 1808-1883. Du fanatisme musulman au patriotisme français. Coulommiers. Paul Brodard; Paris : libr. Hachette, 1925.
- _. L'Armée indigène nord-africaine. Paris : Charles-Lavauzelle, 1925.
- _. Le Général Bedeau : (1804–1863), Alger : A. Jourdan (impr. de A. Jourdan), 1907.
- _. Recherche d'une solution de la question indigène en Algérie. Paris : A. Challamel, 1903.
- _. L'Expédition d'Alger 1830. Avec 4 gravures et une carte. Paris : impr. et libr. Plon, 1930. (13 mars.)
- _. La Frontière algéro-marocaine au début de 1907, Tonnerre : impr. de G. Puyfagès, 1907.
- _. La Campagne de 1800 en Allemagne, par le capitaine Paul Azan, Du Rhin à Ulm. Paris : R. Chapelot, 1909.
- _. Souvenirs de Casablanca : avec une préface du G. d'Amade. Paris : Hachette, 1911.
- _. l'Expedition de Fez, with an introduction by Marshal Lyautey and a preface by General Moinier. Paris: Berger-Levrault, 1924.
- _. Les Premières mitrailleuses (1342-1725) Paris : R. Chapelot, 1907.
- _. Les Belges sur l'Yser. Avec 18 photographies et 6 cartes. P., Berger-Levrault, 1929
- _. Conquête et pacification de l'Algérie, Paris, 1930.
- _. Les Armées françaises d'Outre-mer : conquête et pacification de l'Algérie - Villain et Bar (Impr.), 1931.
- _. L'Armée d'Afrique de 1830 à 1852. Paris, Plon, 1936.
- _. La Légion étrangère en Espagne, 1835–1839, Récits d'Afrique. Paris: H. Charles-Lavauzelle, (1907).
- _. L'Empire Français, Flammarion, 1943.
- _. Argentine. Terre promise Hachette 1943 – Recueil de voyage.
- _. Argentine terre promise, Hachette, 1946.
- _. Franchet d'Esperey, Flammarion, Paris, 1949, 309 pages.
- _. Cahier du Centenaire de l’Algérie Tome IV.
- _. Bugeaud et l’Algérie - Par l’épée et par la charrue.
- _. Souvenirs de Casablanca, Paris, 1912, Hachette et Cie.

=== Translated ===
- _. The Warfare of to-day, Translated by Julian L. Coolidge, Boston : Houghton Mifflin, 1918.
- _. The War of positions, With a preface by brigadier general Joseph E. Kuhn, 4th impression. Cambridge : Harvard University Press, 1917.
