= Alison Beam =

American lawyer

Secretary of the Pennsylvania Department of Health
- In office January 23, 2021 – December 2021
- Governor: Tom Wolf
- Preceded by: Rachel Levine
- Succeeded by: Keara Klinepeter (acting)

Personal details
- Children: 2
- Education: Pennsylvania State University; Drexel University

Alison V. Beam is an American lawyer and lobbyist who served as the acting secretary of the Pennsylvania Department of Health in 2021. She was previously the deputy chief of staff of governor Tom Wolf from 2019 to 2021.

== Life ==
Beam earned a B.S. in health policy and administration from Pennsylvania State University in 2008 where she also participated in its Schreyer Honors College. She received a J.D. from Thomas R. Kline School of Law at Drexel University.

Beam was a policy analyst for Independence Blue Cross. She was director of public policy and associate counsel of the Independence Health Group in Philadelphia. Beam was chief of staff to the commissioner of the Pennsylvania Insurance Department during the administration of governor Tom Corbett. She later served as the deputy chief of staff for Pennsylvania governor Tom Wolf from 2019 to 2021. On January 23, 2021, she succeeded Rachel Levine as the acting secretary of the Pennsylvania Department of Health. She resigned in December 2021 and was succeeded by executive deputy secretary Keara Klinepeter. In February 2022, Beam became the vice president of government affairs at the University of Pittsburgh Medical Center.

Beam resides in Camp Hill, Pennsylvania and has two children.
