= Mary Brewster Hazelton =

American painter (1868–1953)

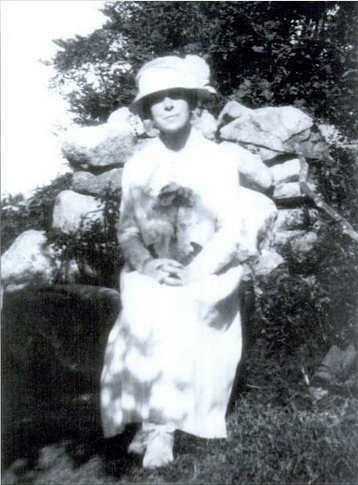
- Born: November 23, 1868; Milton, Massachusetts, US
- Died: September 13, 1953 (aged 84); Wellesley, Massachusetts, US
- Resting place: Woodlawn Cemetery, Wellesley, Massachusetts; 42°17′42.62″N 71°16′42.72″W
- Known for: Painting portraits
- Awards: First Hallgarten Prize, National Academy of Design 1896; Paige Traveling Scholarship, Museum of Fine Arts, Boston 1899; Honorable Mention, Pan-American Exposition 1901; Medal, Panama–Pacific International Exposition 1915

Mary Brewster Hazelton (November 23, 1868 – September 13, 1953) was an American portrait painter. She attended the School of the Museum of Fine Arts, Boston, where she was later an instructor. Among her other achievements, Hazelton was the first woman to win an award open to both men and women in the United States when she won the Hallgarten Prize from the National Academy of Design in 1896. Her portrait paintings are in the collections of the Massachusetts State House, Harvard University, Peabody Essex Museum, and Wellesley Historical Society. The professional organizations that Hazelton was affiliated with included the Wellesley Society of Artists, of which she was a founding member, and The Guild of Boston Artists, of which she was a charter member. She lived her adult life with her sisters in the Hazelton family home in Wellesley, Massachusetts.

== Early life ==
Mary Brewster Hazelton was born on November 23, 1868, in Milton, Massachusetts to Dr. Isaac Hills Hazelton (1838–1929) and Mary Allen Brewster Hazelton (1843–1923). A Harvard College graduate, Dr. Hazelton served for the United States Navy during the Civil War as an assistant surgeon. He was an innovator in the treatment of the mentally ill. Mary had a brother, Isaac Brewster (I. B.) Hazelton (1873–1943), and two sisters, Olivia Bowditch Hazelton (1873–1967) and Margaret Page Hazelton (1876–1965). (Note: Olivia was a kindergarten music education expert, Isaac was a commercial artist, and Margaret was a homemaker.) The family moved to Wellesley, Massachusetts, in 1873. She began making artwork in the 1880s, which she often signed with her nickname, "Daisy". In 1886, Hazelton graduated from Wellesley High School. The three sisters lived together in the family home at 319 Washington Street over the course of their lives. The house has been called "Clapp House" and "Hazelton House".

== Education ==
Hazelton attended the School of the Museum of Fine Arts, Boston (MFAB) under Edmund Tarbell. She was Philip Hale's assistant and completed her education at MFAB in 1892. She was a drawing class assistant for Frank Weston Benson after graduation and the following year became an assistant drawing instructor. Both Benson and Tarbell were noted Boston Impressionists.

Rupert Hughes described Hazelton's painting, Margaret, made by 1895, as a "more than usually tender bit of Impressionism". She studied with Impressionist painters in Paris and also studied in Spain, England, the Netherlands and Italy after winning the Paige Traveling Scholarship from the Museum of Fine Arts, Boston in 1899. Hazelton was the organization's first traveling scholar and received $800 each year of her two-year study program.

== Style ==
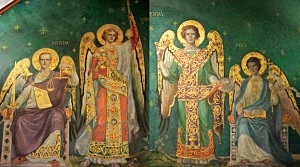
Wellesley Hills Congregational Church murals, 1912

Hazelton was one of the women that collector Everette James identified as having "demonstrate[d] remarkable individual artistic skill" who attended the School of the Museum of Fine Arts, Boston in the late 19th century. This was at a time, though, that women were not recognized for their individual style and abilities. "Tarbellites" was a phrase used at the time that reflected the belief that women's skill was derived from their mentors, like Edmund C. Tarbell. Greater public exposure has helped to highlight the individual and unique qualities of some of the women portrait painters "that would rival a Tarbell, Benson or De Camp," according to James in Antiques Journal. (Note: James owns Hazelton's painting Lady in a Kimono, which has been held at Vanderbilt University's Department of Radiology and Radiological Services.)

In his 2001 article Early Women Artists at the Guild of Boston Artists, Bob Jackman noted that Hazelton painted in a creative and assertive style that included "a loose Impressionist manner" that rivals the works of many other Boston painters. Her technical abilities in composition and use and capture of light are exemplified in the painting Two Sisters at the Piano that she made about 1894.

== Career ==
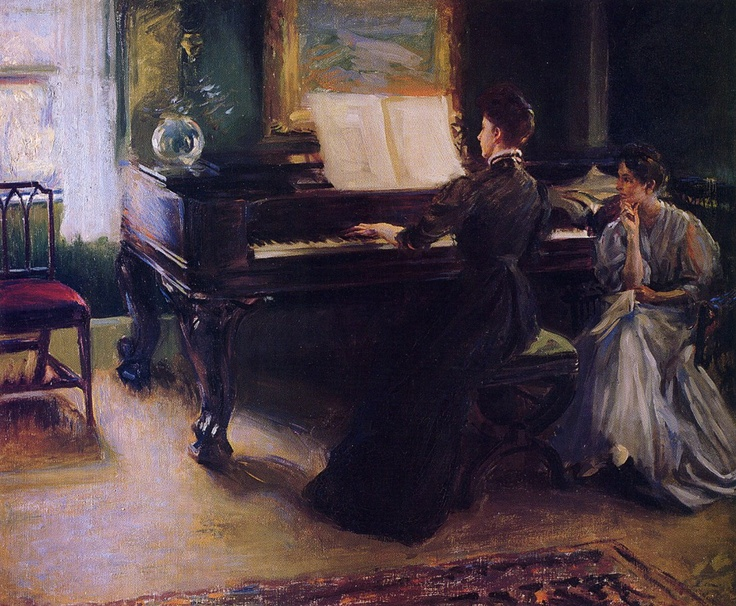
Two Sisters at a Piano, 1894

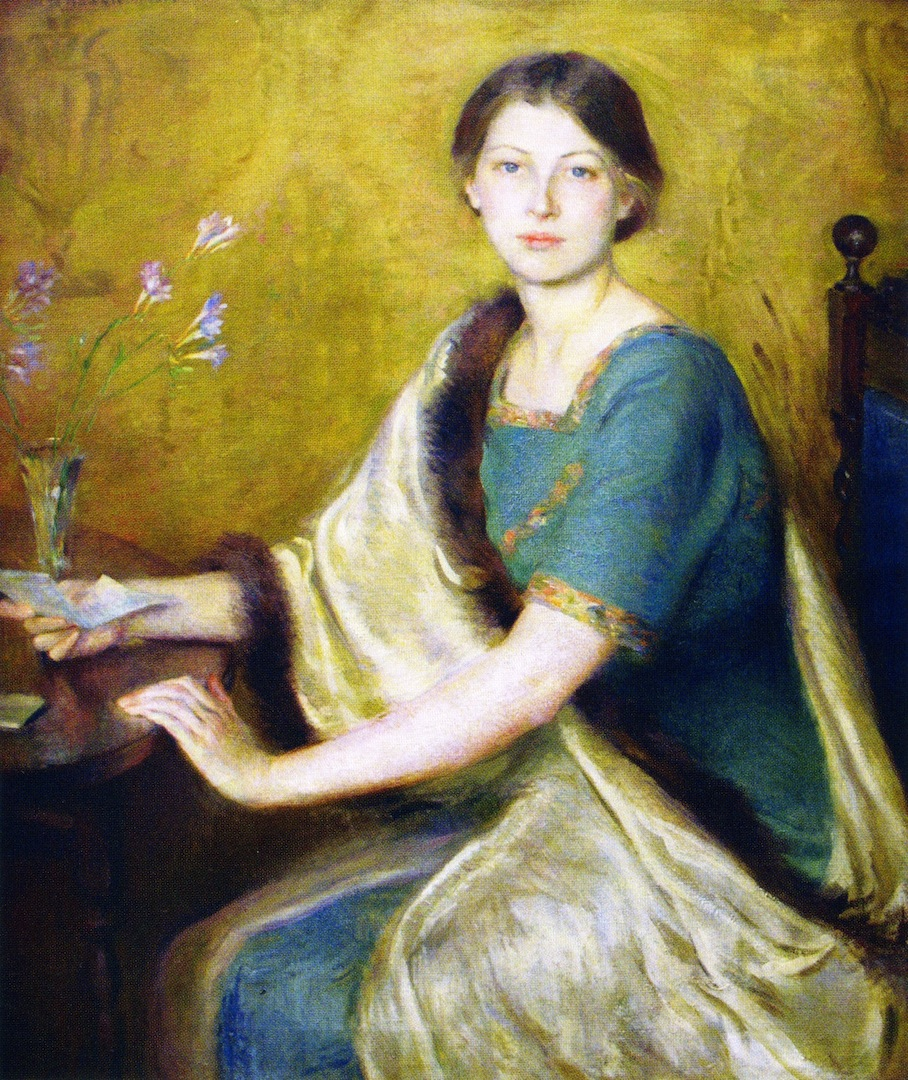
The Letter, 1912, which won the Newport Art prize in 1916

Women did not win non-gender specific awards until 1896 when Hazelton won the National Academy of Design's First Hallgarten Prize for her oil painting In a Studio. It was determined to be the best oil painting made by a person under the age of 35 in the United States that year. The Museum of Fine Arts in Boston awarded her the first Paige Traveling Scholarship in 1899. Hazelton won an Honorable Mention at the Pan-American Exposition in Buffalo, New York in 1901.

Hazelton had a studio at the old Harcourt Building in Boston in 1904, when a severe fire burned the life's work of several artists including Hazelton, Joseph DeCamp, and William M. Paxton. In the aftermath, a group of artists planned for a new building, which became Fenway Studios (30 Ipswich Street). Hazelton was among the initial group of artists that signed up, and arranged for studio 304. From 1906 to 1940, she had a studio at Fenway. (Note: A timeline summary of the Hazelton family by the Wellesley Historical Society also states that in 1909 she established a studio in Boston at 304 Ipswich Street. Hazelton had studio 304 in the Fenway Studios building (30 Ipswich Street) and according to the Wellesley Historical Society was in the studio building from 1906 to 1940.)

In 1912, the Wellesley Hills First Congregational Church commissioned Hazelton, who was a member, to paint wall murals for the church. One mural depicts the four virtues—truth, charity, justice, and faith—in eight-foot figures of three women and one man. For instance, the male figure carries a sword and scales to represent justice. She also created murals of the Four Evangelists and a representation of the Trinity.

During World War I, Hazelton designed a Liberty Loan campaign poster, using her painting Victory's Record. She exhibited The Letter and Reverie at the Panama–Pacific International Exposition in San Francisco, California, in 1915, where she won a bronze medal. She won the Popular Prize in Newport, Rhode Island in 1916 for The Lady in Black. She also won a prize for The Letter at Newport. John Singer Sargent considered her "one of the foremost portrait painters of her time", according to Wellesley author Jennifer A. Jovin.

Hazelton was a Wellesley Society of Artists founder and treasurer, charter member of The Guild of Boston Artists, and an early member of the Copley Society. She was a member of the Concord Art Association, American Federation of Arts, and Connecticut Academy of Fine Arts.

== Death ==
Hazelton suffered a stroke in 1952, which required her to switch to painting with her left hand. She died at the Newton-Wellesley Hospital on September 13, 1953.

In 1965, the Wellesley Historical Society began purchasing paintings by Hazelton for its collection. Scrapbooks, correspondence, sketchbooks, diaries, photographs, and other materials are also held by the Wellesley Historical Society.

== Collections ==
- Harvard Club of Boston, Harvard University
  - John Adams, 1914, after John Singleton Copley
- Harvard University, Cambridge, Massachusetts
  - Paul Jean Louis Azan, 1918, oil on canvas
  - George Cheyne Shattuck, 1910, copy after Gilbert Stuart
  - Dr. John Warren
- Massachusetts General Hospital
  - William Appleton
- Massachusetts State House, Boston, Massachusetts
  - William Stoughton, 1924
- Peabody Essex Museum, Salem, Massachusetts
  - Francis Henry Appleton
- Wellesley Historical Society, Massachusetts – Some of the portraits in their collection of 50 paintings are:
  - Seldon L. Brown
  - Ralph Coburn
  - Herbert M. Hazelton
  - Margaret Page Hazelton
  - Mrs. John Oldham

== Gallery ==
Paintings by Mary Brewster Hazelton

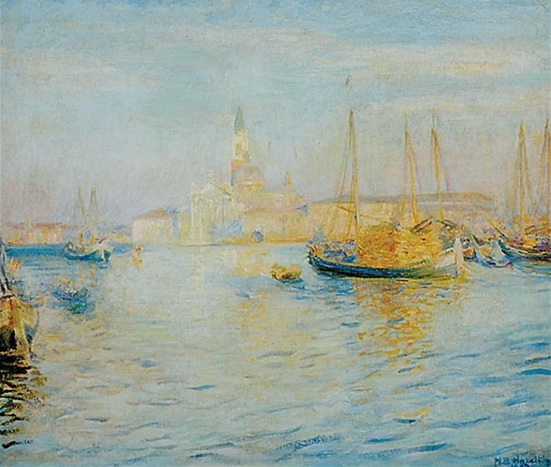
Venice Grand Canal, 1900

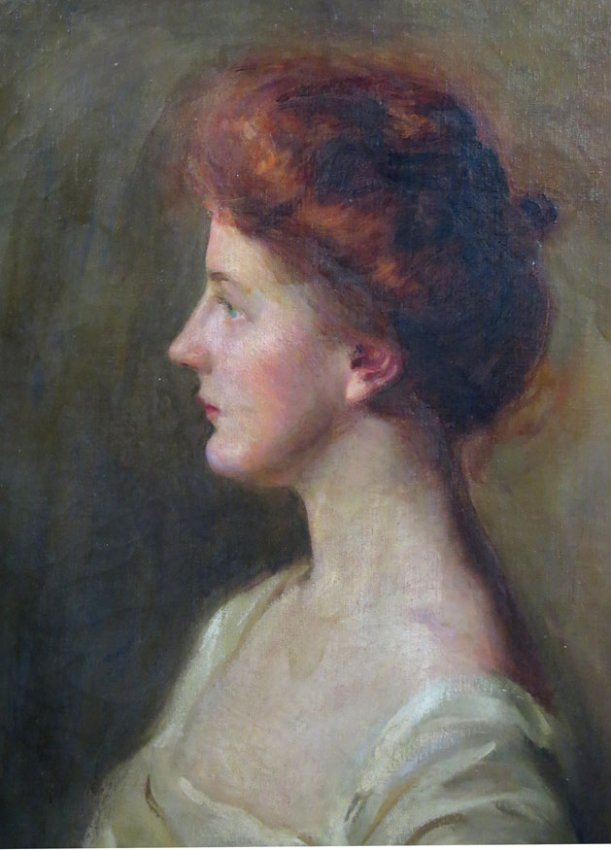
Woman in White, 1906

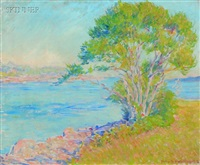
Summer Sunlight, 1912

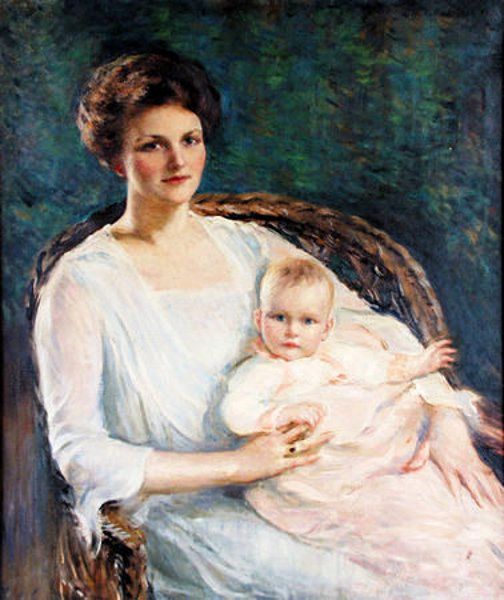
Mother and Child, 1921

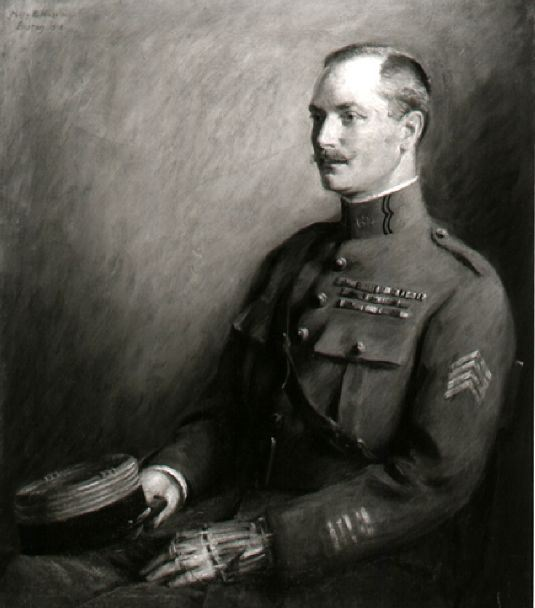
Paul Jean Louis Azan, 1918 (Note: The painting of Paul Jean Louis Azan (1918) is in the Harvard University Portrait Collection, Cambridge, Massachusetts.)

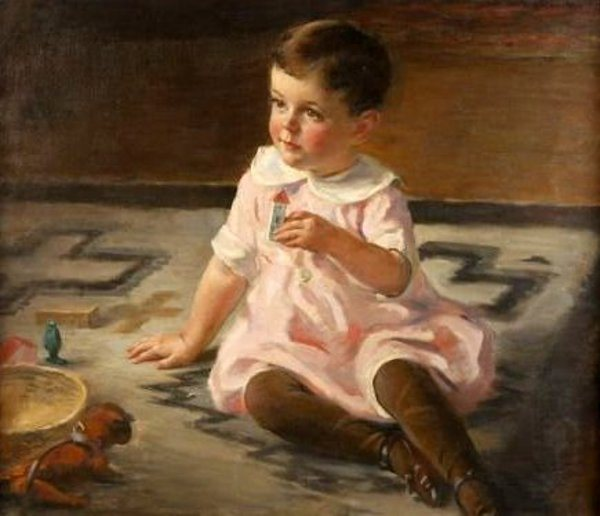
Child with Toys, 1922
