= Rachel Levine =

American public health official (born 1957)

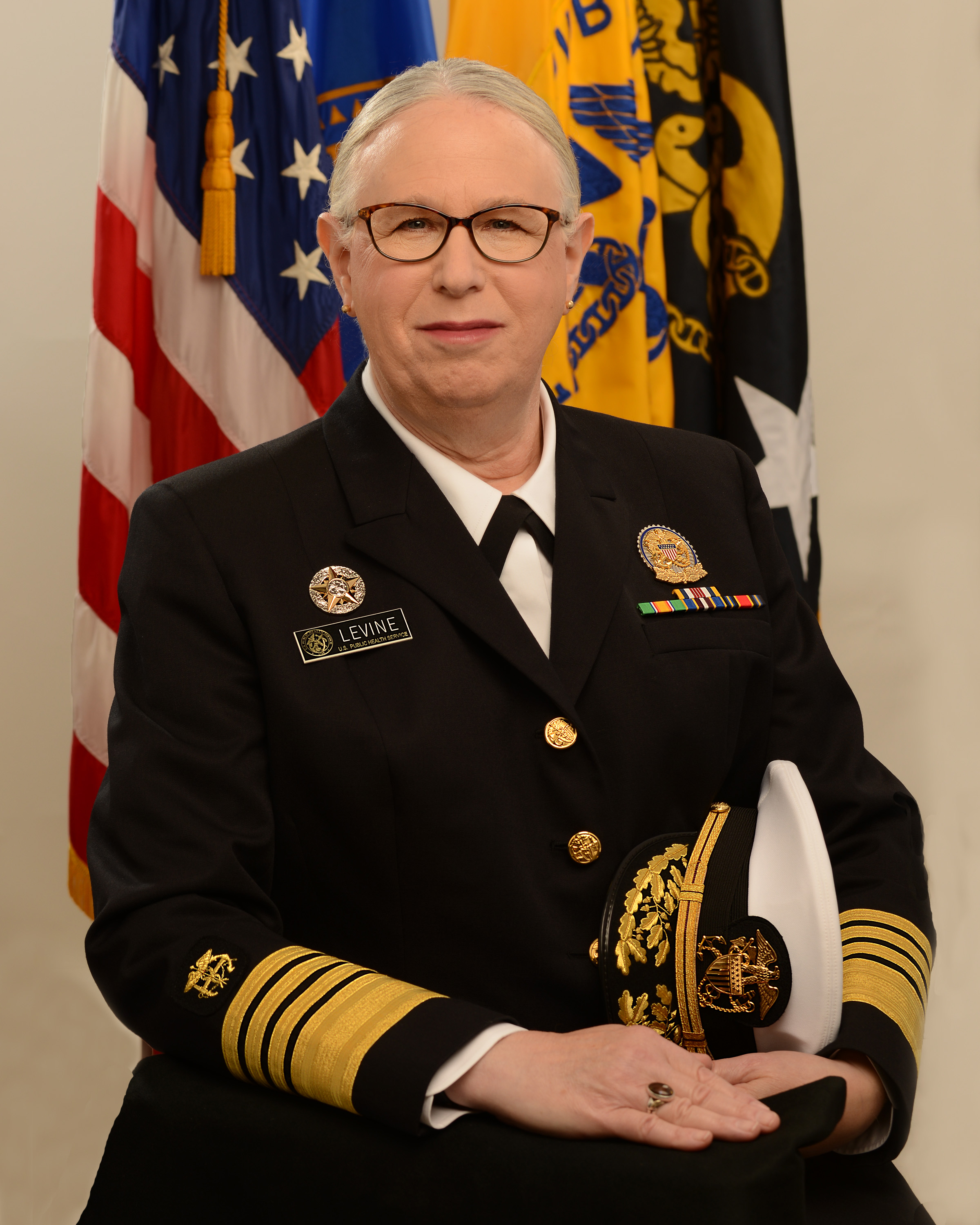
- Official portrait, 2021

17th Assistant Secretary for Health
- In office March 26, 2021 – January 20, 2025
- President: Joe Biden
- Secretary: Xavier Becerra
- Preceded by: Brett Giroir
- Succeeded by: Brian Christine

Secretary of the Pennsylvania Department of Health
- In office July 2017 – January 23, 2021
- Governor: Tom Wolf
- Preceded by: Karen Murphy
- Succeeded by: Alison Beam (acting)

Personal details
- Born: October 28, 1957 (age 68) Wakefield, Massachusetts, U.S.
- Spouse: Martha Peaslee (m. 1988; div. 2013)
- Children: 2
- Education: Harvard University (BS); Tulane University (MD)
- Uniformed service
- Branch: Public Health Service Commissioned Corps
- Service years: 2021–2025
- Rank: Admiral

Rachel Leland Levine (/ləˈviːn/ lə-VEEN; born October 28, 1957) is an American pediatrician who served as the United States assistant secretary for health, the admiral in charge of the United States Public Health Service Commissioned Corps, from 2021 until 2025.

Levine is a professor of pediatrics and psychiatry at the Penn State College of Medicine, and previously served as the Pennsylvania physician general from 2015 to 2017 and as secretary of the Pennsylvania Department of Health from 2017 to 2021. Levine is one of only a few openly transgender government officials in the United States, and is the first to hold an office that requires Senate confirmation. On October 19, 2021, Levine became the first openly transgender four-star officer in the nation's eight uniformed services.

Levine was named as one of USA Today's women of the year in 2022, which recognizes women who have made a significant impact on society.

== Early life and education ==
Born on October 28, 1957, Levine is originally from Wakefield, Massachusetts. Her parents, Melvin and Lillian Levine, were both lawyers. Her sister, Bonnie Levine, is four years older. Levine is Jewish and grew up attending Hebrew school. Levine earned a high school diploma from Belmont Hill School in Belmont, Massachusetts.

Levine graduated from Harvard College and the Tulane University School of Medicine, completing a residency in pediatrics and a postdoctoral fellowship in adolescent medicine at the Mount Sinai Medical Center in Manhattan, New York.

== Career ==
After completing her training in pediatrics and psychiatry at New York City's Mount Sinai Hospital, Levine moved from Manhattan to central Pennsylvania in 1993, where she joined the faculty of the Penn State College of Medicine and the staff at Penn State Hershey Medical Center. During her tenure, she created Penn State Hershey Medical Center's Division of Adolescent Medicine and the Penn State Hershey Eating Disorders Program.

=== Pennsylvania Department of Health ===
In 2015, Levine was nominated by Pennsylvania governor-elect Tom Wolf to serve as Physician General for the Pennsylvania Department of Health. In one of her most lauded actions as physician general, Levine signed an order allowing law enforcement officers to carry naloxone.

A 2016 statewide audit of Pennsylvania nursing homes found "outdated regulations, dangerously low staffing requirements for nurses, and overarching issues with weak and inconsistent inspections." Three years later the Pennsylvania auditor general found little had changed. Responding to the audit and allegations that her department had failed to remedy the shortcomings, Levine said "new regulations were imminent and would fix the problems." However, more than a year later, reporters with the investigative partnership Spotlight PA found: "Not only do problems remain, but the coronavirus has likely exploited the shortcomings, fueling deadly outbreaks across the state."

In July 2017, Governor Wolf appointed Levine as Secretary of Health, and she was unanimously confirmed by the Pennsylvania State Senate.

==== COVID-19 response ====
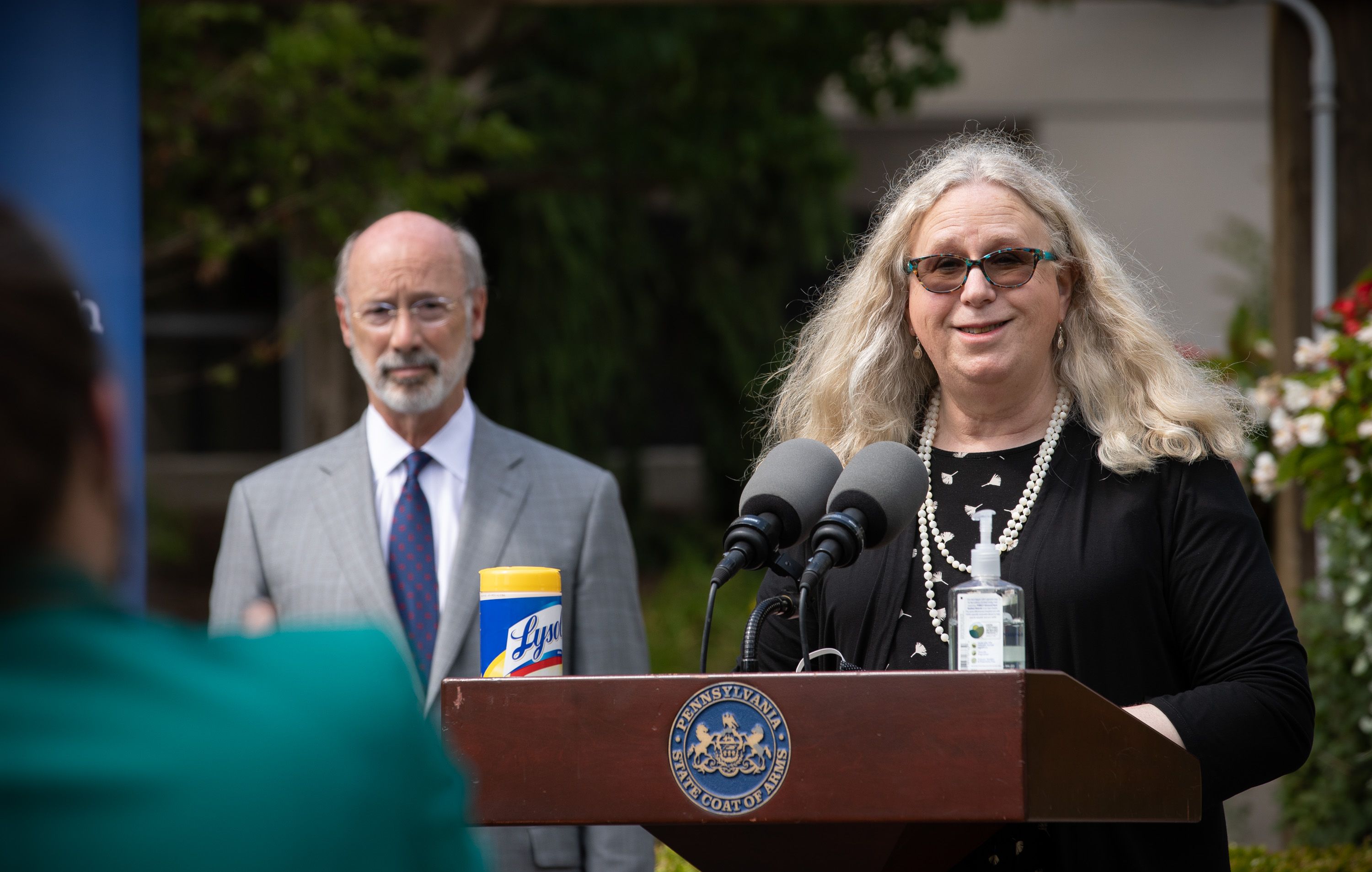
Levine briefing COVID-19 measures with Governor Tom Wolf at the Penn State Milton S. Hershey Medical Center in June 2020

During 2020 and until January 23, 2021, Levine led the public health response on COVID-19 in Pennsylvania as the state secretary of health. She worked closely on a daily basis with the FEMA director and led a daily press briefing. Levine also came in for criticism over her handling of the pandemic, particularly in regard to nursing home patients.

On March 18, 2020, Levine directed nursing homes to admit new patients, including "stable patients who have had the COVID-19 virus” despite the warnings of nursing home trade groups that such policies "could unnecessarily cost more lives." Although the stated purpose of this decision was to alleviate overcrowding in "acute care settings”, according to a team of reporters from the USA Today Network and Bucks County Courier Times, hospitals in most Pennsylvania counties were not experiencing overcrowding at the time. Spotlight PA, also noted that, under Levine, Pennsylvania had a "robust and aggressive" plan to protect nursing home residents but it "was never fully implemented". Spotlight PA also repeatedly reported on erroneous reporting of COVID deaths and other data by state officials.

On May 12, 2020, WHTM reported that following the change in nursing home admissions policies, Levine had moved her own mother out of a nursing home. Levine defended the move: " 'My mother requested, and my sister and I as her children complied to move her to another location during the Covid-19 outbreak,' Levine said. 'My mother is 95 years old. She is very intelligent and more than competent to make her own decisions.' " By the summer of 2020, around 70% of COVID deaths in Pennsylvania were in nursing homes, leading to renewed criticism that state officials were "letting infected patients back into nursing homes" and also that the state had stopped health inspections nursing homes.

The issue of Levine's mother and the high COVID death toll in Pennsylvania nursing homes would momentarily be highlighted nationally after President Biden nominated Levine for the post of US Assistant Secretary for Health. As Newsweek reported, "The criticism ... has come from a few Republican leaders ..." Newsweek also fact-checked the claim that Levine put COVID-19 patients into nursing homes, concluding the claim was false and "There is no evidence to support [Representative Marjorie Taylor] Greene's claim that Levine placed coronavirus-positive patients in nursing home facilities, thus likely contributing 'to the thousands of elderly deaths in Pennsylvania.' " Questions about missing nursing home COVID death and case data would also come up again during Levine's confirmation hearings.

In 2021, Pennsylvania nursing home trade groups indicated they were unaware of any nursing home in the state that was forced to involuntarily accept a COVID-positive patient or that Levine's March 18, 2020, order had led to any deaths or disease outbreaks. In July 2021 the US Department of Justice (DoJ) announced it would not be investigating "whether Pennsylvania violated federal law by ordering nursing homes to accept residents who had been treated for COVID-19 in a hospital." Eleven months earlier, the DoJ had informed the governors of Pennsylvania and three other states it was seeking information to determine whether such orders "may have resulted in the deaths of thousands of elderly nursing home residents."

=== Biden administration ===
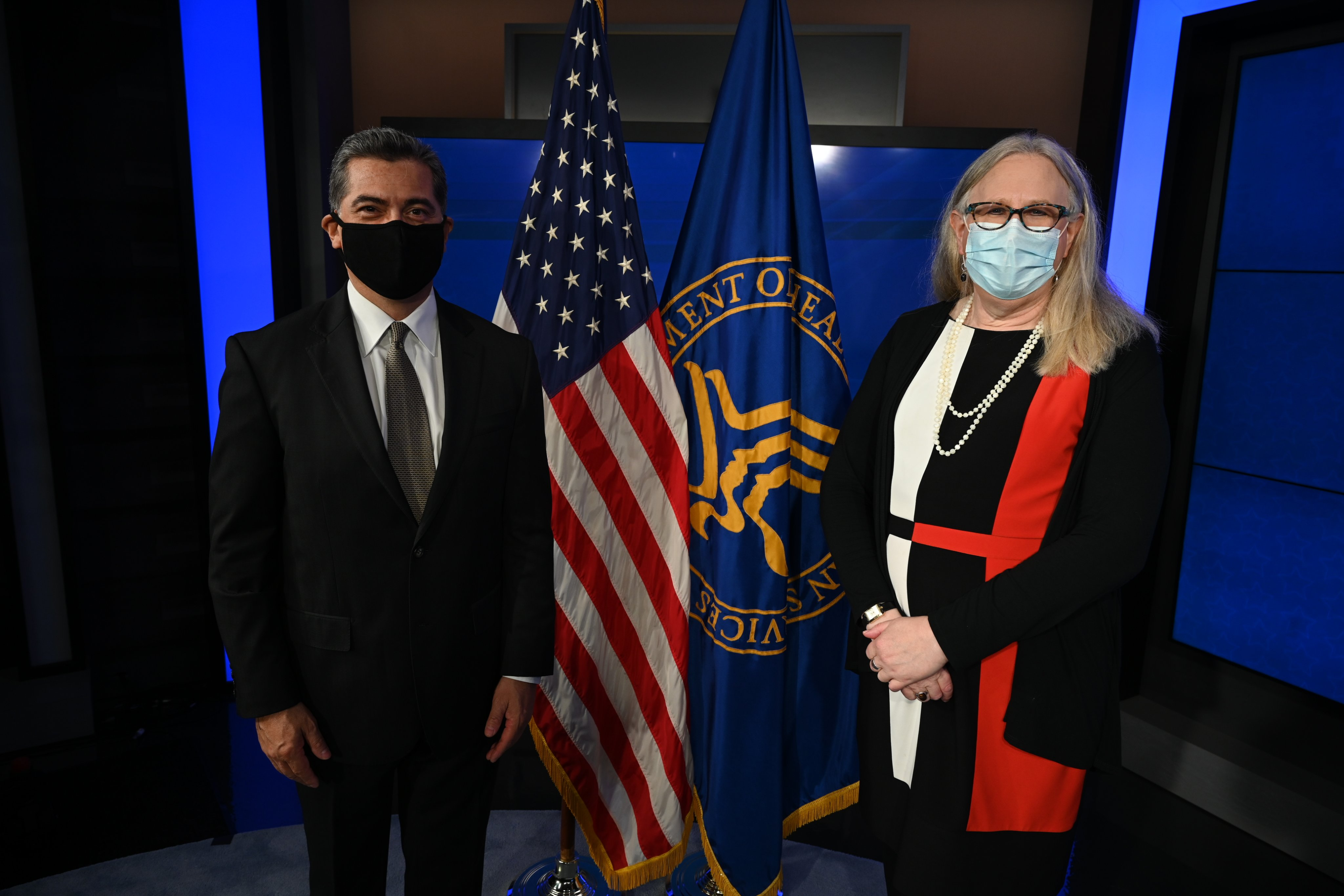
Levine with U.S. secretary of health and human services Xavier Becerra after being sworn in as assistant secretary for health, March 27, 2021

On February 13, 2021, President Joe Biden formally nominated Levine to serve as Assistant Secretary for Health. Her confirmation hearing with the Senate HELP Committee took place on February 25. On March 17, the committee voted 13–9 to advance her nomination for a full Senate vote. On March 24, the Senate voted 52–48, with all Democrats and two Republicans — Susan Collins from Maine and Lisa Murkowski from Alaska — joining all members of the Senate Democratic Caucus to confirm her nomination. Levine is the first openly transgender person to hold an office that requires Senate confirmation.

On October 19, 2021, Levine was commissioned as a four-star admiral in the U.S. Public Health Service Commissioned Corps, becoming the first openly transgender four-star officer in any of the United States uniformed services as well as the first female four-star admiral in the Commissioned Corps.

==== LGBTQ health disparities ====
Shortly after her confirmation, Levine told NBC News that LGBTQ youth are topmost in her mind when it comes to addressing health disparities in the United States. She cited bullying, suicide, discriminatory policies, and isolation during the COVID-19 pandemic as pressing issues among LGBTQ youth. Levine has also expressed concerns about vaccine hesitancy among LGBTQ youth who are more likely to experience medical distrust and less likely to seek medical care.

During an April 2022 speech at Texas Christian University, Levine criticized "disturbing – and frankly discriminatory – laws and actions" that many states have implemented that affect the lives of LGBTQ youth. In an interview with NPR, she cited a range of policies, including Florida's "Don't Say Gay" bill and Texas' push to investigate parents who provide gender-affirming care to their transgender children. Arguing that such policies are based on politics rather than public health, Levine encouraged people to contact the Office for Civil Rights when they feel discriminated against and vowed to provide support to those who contact her office.

== Personal life ==
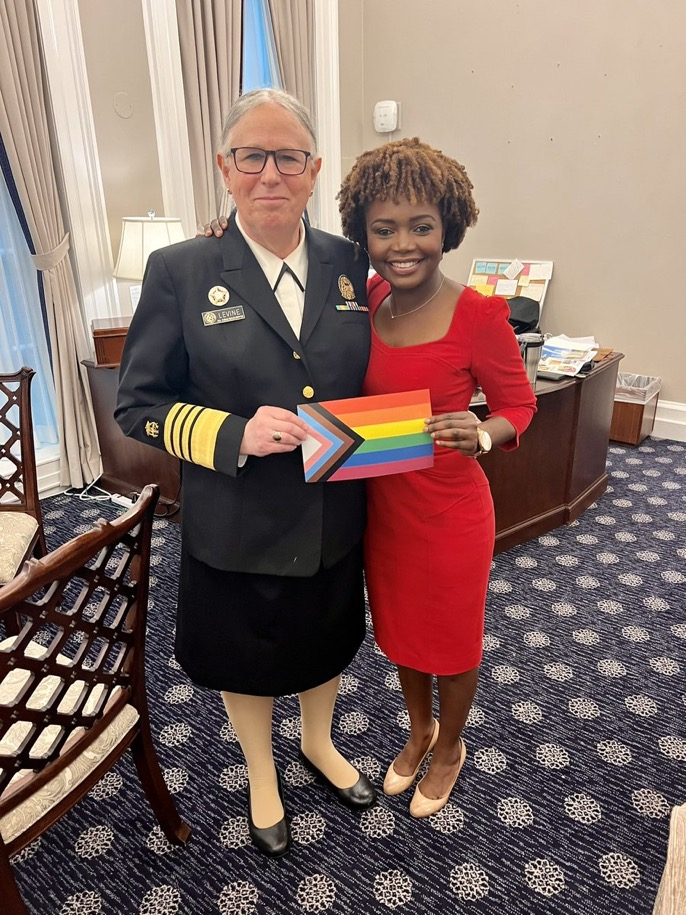
Levine and White House press secretary Karine Jean-Pierre hold a pride flag in 2022

Levine is a transgender woman and uses she/her pronouns. She has two children with Martha Peaslee Levine, whom she married while at Tulane University. They divorced in 2013.

Levine began exploring her gender identity in her 40s, and transitioned in 2011. She has served as a board member of Equality Pennsylvania, an LGBTQ rights organization.

== Honors ==
Levine was named as one of USA Today's Women of the Year in 2022.

== Awards and decorations ==
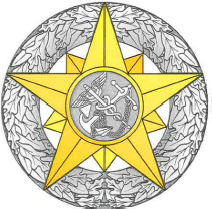
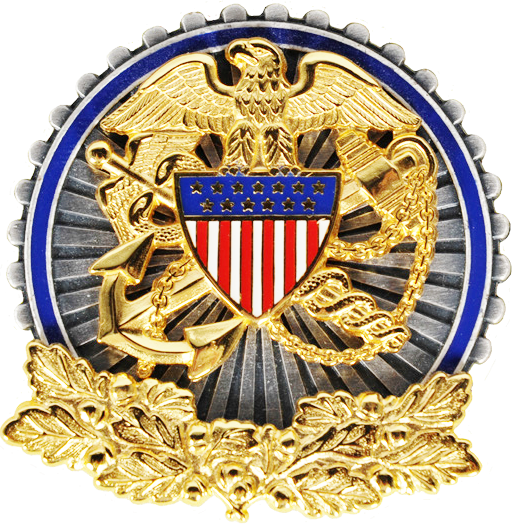

Public Health Service Meritorious Service Medal		Public Health Service Presidential Unit Citation
Public Health Service COVID-19 Pandemic Campaign Medal	Public Health Service Regular Corps Ribbon	Commissioned Corps Training Ribbon
Assistant Secretary for Health Badge		Office of the Secretary of Health and Human Services Badge

== Publications ==
- Fassbender, Laura; Zander, Gwendolyn B.; Levine, Rachel L. (July 2019). "Beyond rescue, treatment, and prevention: understanding the broader impact of the opioid epidemic at the state level". The American Journal of Managed Care. 25 (13 Suppl): S239–S240. PMID 31361432.
- Ashburn, Michael A.; Levine, Rachel L. (October 1, 2017). "Pennsylvania State Core Competencies for Education on Opioids and Addiction". Pain Medicine. 18 (10): 1890–1894. doi:10.1093/pm/pnw348. PMID 28339890. S2CID 205292295.
- Mahr, Fauzia; Farahmand, Pantea; Bixler, Edward O.; Domen, Ronald E; Moser, Eileen M.; Nadeem, Tania; Levine, Rachel L.; Halmi, Katherine A. (May 2015). "A national survey of eating disorder training: National Survey of Eating Disorder Training". International Journal of Eating Disorders. 48 (4): 443–445. doi:10.1002/eat.22335. PMID 25047025.
- McFillin, R. K.; Cahn, S. C.; Burks, V. S.; Levine, M. P.; Loney, S. L.; Levine, R. L. (2012). "Social Information-Processing and Coping in Adolescent Females Diagnosed With an Eating Disorder: Toward a Greater Understanding of Control". Eating Disorders. 20 (1): 42–59. doi:10.1080/10640266.2012.635565. PMID 22188059. S2CID 205730298.
- Levine, M. M. P.; Levine, R. L. (2010). "Psychiatric Medication". In Maine, M.; McGilley, B. H.; Bunnell, D. W. (eds.). Treatment of Eating Disorders; Bridging the Research – Practice Gap. Academic Press. pp. 111–126. doi:10.1016/B978-0-12-375668-8.10007-5. ISBN 978-0-12-375668-8.
- Levine, M. P.; Gershenson, B.; Falkinburg, K.; Levine, R. (April 30 – May 2, 2009). Eating disorders in anabaptist patients: Offering insights into the etiology of eating disorders (PDF). International Conference on Eating Disorders 2009. Cancun, Mexico: Academy for Eating Disorders.
- Levine, M. P.; Levine, R. L. (March 4, 2008). "The Medical Minute: Eating disorder awareness". Penn State News. Hershey, PA. Archived from the original on July 11, 2021.
- Peters, T. E.; Parvin, M.; Petersen, C.; Faircloth, V. C.; Levine, R. L. (2007). "A case report of Wernicke's encephalopathy in a pediatric patient with anorexia nervosa – restricting type". Journal of Adolescent Health. 40 (4): 376–383. doi:10.1016/j.jadohealth.2006.11.140. PMID 17367738.
- Levine, R. L. (2002). "Endocrine aspects of eating disorders in adolescents". Adolescent Medicine. 13 (1): 129–144. PMID 11841960.
- Ostrov, B. E.; Levine, R. L. (1998). "16. Interactions of puberty with rheumatic diseases, contraception and gynaecological issues". In Isenberg, D. K.; Miller, J. J. III (eds.). Adolescent Rheumatology. Taylor & Francis. pp. 301–324. ISBN 978-1-853-17553-4.
- Henderson, C. J.; Ostrov, B. E.; Levine, R. L.; Lovell, D. J. (1998). "17. Nutrition and the adolescent with rheumatic disease". In Isenberg, D. K.; Miller, J. J. III (eds.). Adolescent Rheumatology. Taylor & Francis. pp. 325–340. ISBN 978-1-853-17553-4.

== See also ==
- List of transgender political office-holders
- List of transgender public officeholders in the United States

Political offices
Preceded by Karen Murphy	Secretary of the Pennsylvania Department of Health; 2017–2021	Succeeded by Alison Beam (Acting)
Government offices
Preceded by Brett Giroir	Assistant Secretary for Health; 2021–2025	Succeeded by Leith J. States (Acting)
