= Pennsylvania Department of Health =

Health agency in Pennsylvania, US

Agency overview
- Formed: April 27, 1905
- Jurisdiction: Commonwealth of Pennsylvania
- Headquarters: 8th Floor West, Health and Human Services Building, Harrisburg, Pennsylvania
- Agency executive: Dr. Debra L. Bogen, Secretary of Health
- Website: http://www.health.pa.gov

Pennsylvania Department of Health is the health department for the state of Pennsylvania. It is a cabinet-level agency that was established in 1905, and later modified by the Administrative Code of 1929. In 1996, the requirement for the Secretary to be a physician was eliminated and the position of Physician General was created.

== Mission ==
The Department of Health utilizes community-based strategies to reduce serious illnesses, injuries, and deaths from major health threats, tobacco-related diseases, infectious diseases, and accidental injuries. Its mission has evolved to address the changing landscape of public health, providing programs and services aimed at promoting healthy behaviors, preventing injury and disease, and ensuring the safe delivery of quality healthcare for all Pennsylvania citizens.

== Secretaries ==
Name	Dates served	Appointed by
Samuel Gibson Dixon	1905–1918	Samuel W. Pennypacker
Edward Martin	1919–1923	William Cameron Sproul
Charles H. Miner	1923–1927	Gifford Pinchot
Theodore B. Appel	1927–1935	John Stuchell Fisher
Edith MacBride-Dexter	1935–1939	George Howard Earle
John J. Shaw	1939–1941	Arthur James
Alexander H. Stewart	1942–1945	Arthur James
Harry W. West	1945–1947	Edward Martin
Norris W. Vaux	1947–1951	James H. Duff
Russell E. Teague	1951–1955	John S. Fine
Berwyn F. Mattison	1955–1957	George M. Leader
Charles L. Wilbar	1957–1967	George M. Leader
Thomas W. Georges	1967	Raymond P. Shafer
Ellsworth R. Browneller	1970–1971	Raymond P. Shafer
J. Finton Speller	1971–1974	Milton Shapp
Leonard Bachman	1975–1979	Milton Shapp
Gordon K. MacLeod	1979	Dick Thornburgh
H. Arnold Muller	1979–1987	Dick Thornburgh
N. Mark Richards	1987–1991	Bob Casey Sr.
Allan S. Noonan	1992–1995	Bob Casey Sr.
Peter J. Jannetta	1995–1996	Tom Ridge
Daniel F. Hoffman	1996–1999	Tom Ridge
Robert S. Zimmerman	1999–2003	Tom Ridge
Calvin B. Johnson	2003–2008	Ed Rendell
Everette James	2008–2011	Ed Rendell
Eli Avila	2011–2012	Tom Corbett
Michael Wolf	2012–2015	Tom Corbett
Karen Murphy	2015–2017	Tom Wolf
Rachel Levine	2017–2021	Tom Wolf
Alison Beam (Acting)	2021–2022	Tom Wolf
Keara Klineparter (Acting)	2022	Tom Wolf
Denise Johnson (Acting)	2022–2023	Tom Wolf
Debra Bogen	2023–Present	Josh Shapiro

== See also ==
- List of Pennsylvania state agencies
