= Calvin B. Johnson =

24th Secretary of the Pennsylvania Department of Health
- In office April 2003 – October 23, 2008
- Governor: Edward G. Rendell

Calvin B. Johnson served as the 24th Secretary of Health for the Commonwealth of Pennsylvania. Johnson was appointed to his post by Governor Edward G. Rendell in April 2003 to lead the Pennsylvania Department of Health. On October 23, 2008, Johnson joined the Temple University Health System as vice president and chief medical officer.

== Education ==
Johnson graduated from Morehouse College in 1989 with a degree in chemistry. He earned his medical degree from The Johns Hopkins University School of Medicine in 1993 and a master's degree in public health from The Johns Hopkins University Bloomberg School of Public Health. Johnson also served as a commissioned officer in the Medical Corps of the United States Army Reserve-National Guard, achieving the rank of major.

== Career ==
During his five-year tenure, Johnson directed the health services and functions of the Pennsylvania Department of Health and successfully advanced the mission and effectiveness of the Department of Health by initiating and implementing key strategic programs which included: the allocation of more than $350 million to research projects; increasing state funding by $3 million for targeted HIV/AIDS prevention and early detection; and establishing a data-driven management system to improve performance management and outcome measurements.

He also successfully implemented key components of the governor's health-care reform plan, including hospital-acquired infection control and health-disparity reduction. Other priority initiatives included the creation of a surveillance and intervention pilot program to reduce youth violence, and the management of more than $50 million in annual federal appropriations for bioterrorism and public-health preparedness.

Prior to his appointment in Pennsylvania, Johnson served as the medical director of Family Health Services at the New York City Department of Health.

In August 2020, Johnson was introduced as Royal Caribbean International's Chief Medical Officer.
