= Debra Bogen =

American pediatrician and public health official

Secretary of the Pennsylvania Department of Health
- Incumbent
- Assumed office January 26, 2023
- Governor: Josh Shapiro
- Preceded by: Denise Johnson (acting)

Personal details
- Education: Barnard College; University of Colorado School of Medicine

Debra L. Bogen is an American pediatrician and public health official who is the secretary of health of Pennsylvania.

== Life ==
Bogen earned a B.A. in chemistry, cum laude, from the Columbia University in 1985. She completed a M.D. at the University of Colorado School of Medicine in 1992. From 1992 to 1995, she completed a pediatric residency and general academic pediatrics fellowship at the Johns Hopkins School of Medicine. Bogen conducted postdoctoral research at the Johns Hopkins School of Medicine from 1996 to 1998. She became a fellow of the American Academy of Pediatrics in 1992. She joined the American Pediatric Society in 1996. In 2004, she became a fellow of the Academy of Breastfeeding Medicine.

Bogen is an advocate for maternal and child health issues. She is one of the founders of the Mid-Atlantic Mother's Milk Bank. At the University of Pittsburgh, Bogen held a primary academic appointment as a professor of pediatrics and secondary appointments in psychiatry and clinical and translational science. She was vice chair for education at the UPMC Children's Hospital of Pittsburgh's pediatric department. In March 2020, she succeeded Karen Hacker as director of the Allegheny County Health Department.

In January 2023, she was nominated by governor-elect Josh Shapiro to serve as the Pennsylvania Secretary of Health. Her nomination was withdrawn on June 27, 2023. She was later renominated, and the Pennsylvania State Senate voted to confirm her nomination on July 1, 2024.
