= Everette James =

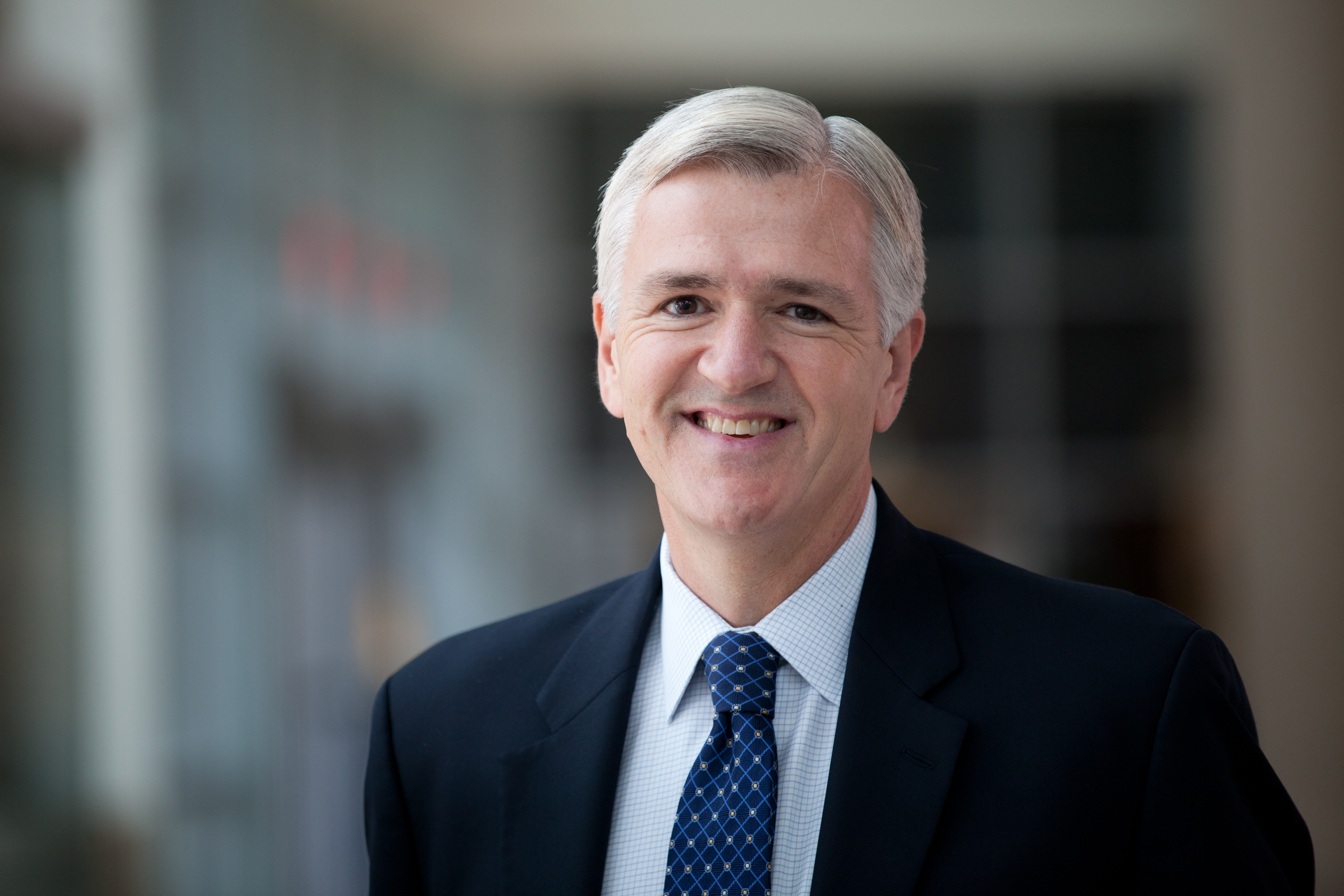
- Everette James
- Scientific career
- Fields: Health Policy and Management
- Institutions: University of Pittsburgh

Everette James is Professor of Health Policy and Management at the University of Pittsburgh and Director of the University of Pittsburgh's Health Policy Institute (HPI).

== Biography ==
In September, 2014 James was named to the M. Allen Pond Endowed Chair in Health Policy and Management. He teaches graduate courses on the history of U.S. health reform and writes and speaks frequently on healthcare business and legal issues.

From 2008 to 2010, he served as the 25th Secretary of the Pennsylvania Department of Health during which time he implemented the commonwealth's first statewide smoking ban, a program to eliminate hospital-acquired infections, expanded scope of practice for nurses, physician assistants, and other advanced practice professionals, and developed new nutrition and physical education standards in Pennsylvania's schools.

He resigned as Secretary to take the position of Associate Vice Chancellor for Health Policy and Planning at the University of Pittsburgh in September 2010. He is Professor of Health Policy and Management at university's Graduate School of Public Health where he teaches, advises students, conducts health services research, as well as counsels the university and the University of Pittsburgh Medical Center (UPMC) on legal issues related to health reform. He leads Pitt and UPMC's comparative effectiveness research program, which analyzes health data from existing health care interventions to determine which work best for which patients and which pose the greatest benefits and harm.

In July, 2011, James was named Director of the Pitt Health Policy Institute. He manages the day-to-day operations of HPI and works with government, foundation and business funders to support the Institute's research and programs. HPI is the only academic health policy institute in the U.S. that combines expertise across of all the health sciences - medicine, public health, pharmacy, nursing, dentistry and the rehabilitation sciences - to conduct applied health policy research and analysis. The HPI Governance Initiative convenes trustees, practitioners and thought leaders to identify best practices and provide executive education on today's rapidly changing regulatory environment. HPI also houses the Comparative Effectiveness Research Center, the Center for Pharmaceutical Policy and Prescribing, and the Center for Interprofessional Practice, which is an Innovation Incubator in the National Coordinating Center for Interprofessional Practice and Education and designs and evaluates new models of healthcare delivery.||

Everette James is nationally recognized for his expertise in health law and regulation and his previous work combatting childhood obesity and improving the health of children and their families.
