= Karen Murphy (Pennsylvania nurse) =

American nurse and healthcare administrator

Secretary of Health of Pennsylvania
- In office May 13, 2015 – July 2017
- Governor: Tom Wolf
- Preceded by: Michael Wolf
- Succeeded by: Rachel Levine

Personal details
- Education: Temple University; Marywood University; University of Scranton

Karen Murphy is an American registered nurse and healthcare administrator. She previously served as the Pennsylvania Secretary of Health, having been nominated by Pennsylvania Governor Tom Wolf and confirmed in May 2015. Prior to that, she served as Pennsylvania Director of the State Innovation Models Initiative and CEO of the Moses Taylor Health System.

== Biography ==
Murphy received a registered nurse diploma from the Scranton State Hospital School of Nursing. She holds a Bachelor of Science from the University of Scranton (1991), a Master of Business Administration from Marywood University, and a Doctorate of Philosophy in Business Administration from the Fox School of Business and Management at Temple University.

Murphy worked at Moses Taylor Hospital in Scranton, Pennsylvania, for thirty-four years, beginning in 1977, when she was hired by the hospital as a registered nurse.

She became president and CEO of Moses Taylor Hospital in 2009. On January 5, 2012, Murphy announced her departure from Moses Taylor, just two days after the $152-million dollar acquisition of Moses Taylor Hospital by a for-profit company, Community Health Systems Inc. She took a temporary, two-month interim leadership position at a new community foundation created by the sale.
