= Flying Foam Passage =

Passage in Dampier Archipelago of Western Australia

Coordinates: 20°28′S 116°50′E

Flying Foam Passage is a north–south passage between Angel Island and Dolphin Island in the Dampier Archipelago, near Dampier, Western Australia.

The passage is named after the 33-ton coastal schooner Flying Foam, which disappeared without trace in March 1872. Its name is, however, most prominently associated with the 1868 massacre of indigenous Australians in the area.

The passage is a significant site of vessels lost.
