= Republic of Manitobah =

Short-lived unrecognized republic in present-day Canada

Coordinates: 49°58′22″N 98°17′31″W

- 1867–1868
- Status: Unrecognized state
- Government: Republic
- History
  - Established: 1867
  - Disestablished: 1868
Preceded by	Succeeded by
Rupert's Land	Rupert's Land
- Today part of: Manitoba, Canada

The Republic of Manitobah was a short-lived, unrecognized state founded in June 1867 by Thomas Spence at the town of Portage la Prairie in what is now the Canadian province of Manitoba.

== History ==
In the mid-19th century, the future province of Manitoba was still part of Rupert's Land, a territory owned by the Hudson's Bay Company (HBC).

By 1858, the population of the Portage community had developed to the point where the necessity of municipal corporation became evident. As Portage la Prairie had no government, laws or taxation at the time, Spence and a group of local settlers formed a provisional government in January 1868, first calling it the Republic of Caledonia before changing the name later to the Republic of Manitobah, after a local lake. The following month, Spence and his group wrote to the British Colonial Office asking for the republic to be recognized as a political entity, but there was no reply.

=== Demise ===
The republic never had clearly defined borders, and could not persuade local HBC traders to pay their taxes. By late spring 1868, the republic had been informed by the Colonial Office in London that its government had no power. The republic's problems were compounded by a botched libel trial over accusations of the misappropriation of tax funds. The Republic of Manitobah collapsed before it had a chance to blossom.

Thomas Spence served in the council for Louis Riel’s provisional government, whose actions led to the formation of the Province of Manitoba within Canada on July 15, 1870.

== Legacy ==
Thomas Spence was the first person to use the word Manitoba in reference to both the lake and surrounding territory; so, while the government dissolved, the name Manitoba remains to this day.

The story of the Republic of Manitobah was made into a humorous animated short, called Spence's Republic, by the National Film Board of Canada in 1978, as a part of the Canada Vignettes series.
