= Flying Foam massacre =

Massacre of Aboriginal people in Western Australia

Coordinates: 20.581°S 116.808°E

The Flying Foam Massacre was a massacre of Aboriginal people around Flying Foam Passage on Murujuga (Burrup Peninsula) in Western Australia by colonial settlers. Comprising a series of atrocities between February and May 1868, the massacre was in retaliation to the killing of a police officer, a police assistant, and a local workman. Collectively the atrocities resulted in the deaths of an unknown number of Jaburara (or Yaburrara, Yapurarra) people, but with estimates ranging from 15 to 150 dead men, women and children.

== Details ==
After Police Constable William Griffis allegedly "abducted a young Aboriginal woman at gunpoint and took her 'into the bush'" (colloquialism for rape), he apprehended her husband Coolyerberri for "stealing flour from a pearling boat, on 6 February 1868." In response, nine Jaburara men carried out a rescue overnight, and "in freeing Coolyerberri" Griffis was speared. An assistant and a pearling worker were also killed during the fight. The atrocities perpetuated by the two assembled parties of "special constables" were in response to the 7 February killing of Griffis, the Aboriginal police assistant named Peter, and the pearling worker named George Breem, on the south-west shore of Nickol Bay, along with the disappearance of a pearling lugger captain, Henry Jermyn. Three Jaburara were arrested and convicted of Griffis' murder. Initially sentenced to death, their sentences were commuted to twelve years' penal servitude on Rottnest Island.

Pearlers and pastoralists from the surrounding region, with the approval and support of Robert John Sholl, the Government Resident in Roebourne, organised two armed and mounted parties, which travelled overland and by sea to Murujuga, the heartland of the Jaburara people. The two parties moved towards each other on the peninsula in a pincer movement. Official sources and oral tradition suggest that one atrocity by the parties, on a Jaburara camp at King Bay on 17 February, killed at least 15 people, including children. Because these atrocities were the main factor in a sharp decline of the Jaburara population, they are significant and controversial in native title cases for descendants of the Jaburara people, as well as cultural heritage issues surrounding the World Monuments-listed Jaburara rock art on Murujuga.

== Remembrance ==
On 17 February 2013, the 145th anniversary of the first atrocity of the massacre, Aboriginal elders, and other leaders, held the first Flying Foam Massacre Remembrance Day at the King Bay Massacre site. Supporting actions were held at the Aboriginal Tent Embassy in Canberra, the Western Australian Parliament, the New South Wales Parliament, the Royal Exhibition Building in Melbourne, the Tandanya Indigenous Arts Centre in Adelaide, in Brunswick, Melbourne, and in the Victorian Central Highlands towns of Taradale and Daylesford.

As of January 2025, the National Police Memorial in Canberra commemorates Griffis as a police officer who died whilst on active duty. Details of his death, which make no mention of the rape Griffis allegedly perpetrated whilst on active duty and that led to his spearing by the husband of his victim, nor of the massacre into which it ultimately degenerated, are shown as,

speared to death by prisoner Coolyerberri who had been released by other [... Aboriginals] during the night whilst the party was camped on the Shore of Nickol Bay in WA's north-west.

== See also ==
- List of massacres of Indigenous Australians
- List of massacres in Australia
- Crimes against humanity
