= Oo Zun =

Burmese Buddhist nun and humanitarian

Daw Oo Zun
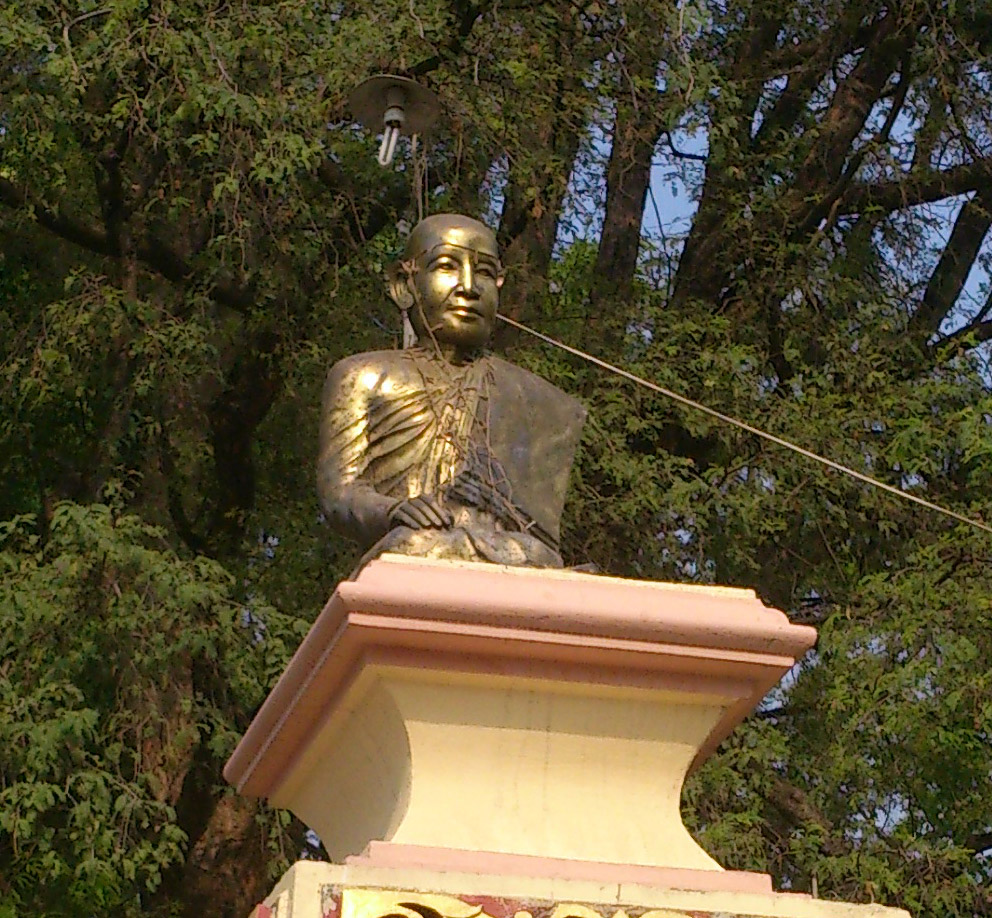
- A bronze statue of Oo Zun.
- Born: August 7, 1868; Mandalay, Myanmar
- Died: May 11, 1944 (aged 75); Mingun, Myanmar
- Occupations: Buddhist Nun, Humanitarian
- Notable work: Founder of Mingun Buddhist Home for the Aged
- Awards: TPS (Taing Kyo Pyi Kyo Saung)

Daw Oo Zun (also spelt as Oo Soon, Burmese: ဦးဇွန်း; 7 August 1868 – 11 May 1944) was a Burmese Buddhist nun and humanitarian who was recognized as Myanmar's first female social worker and founder of Mingun Buddhist Home for the Aged. She was awarded the TPS (Taing Kyo Pyi Kyo Saung), one of the country's highest civilian honors, by the governor of British India. Oo Zun has been dubbed the "mother of elderly homes" in Myanmar.

== Life ==
Oo Zun was born on 7 August 1868 in the royal capital Mandalay, during the reign of King Mindon of the Konbaung dynasty. She was the only daughter of a wealthy silk merchant from Amarapura, U Ei, and Daw Myien. Since her childhood, she was involved in helping her parents' livelihood. When she turned 18, she served as her father's assistant.

At the age of 18, she built a temple named Ruby Monastery using her own money and achieved the RMD Award given by Badamyar Sayadaw, which earned her the nickname "Payarama". After her parents' deaths, she took over their properties, but she was by no means happy or depressed. She was grieving over the death of her parents. One day, she visited a nursing home established by Bishop Bigandet, the Bishop of Yangon in Yangon. During that period, there was only one old French missionary home in Myanmar. She harbored concerns that if Buddhists sought refuge there, they might encounter religious challenges. Consequently, she devised a plan to establish an elderly care center, ensuring individuals could freely practice their own religion without any religious implications. In 1915, Oo Zun consulted with respected individuals in Mandalay regarding the construction of the city's first nursing home. During this discussion, she expressed,

(In Burmese): "ကျွန်မတို့ဗုဒ္ဓဘာသာမြန်မာလူမျိုးတွေဟာ အဆင်မသင့်လို့ စင်မြင့်ကနေဆင်းပြီး သူတစ်ပါးလက်အောက်ခံနိုင်ငံဖြစ်နေရတာ၊ ကျွန်မတို့ ကိုယ့်ခြေထောက်ပေါ်ကိုယ်ရပ်ပြီး ကျွန်မတို့ကိုယ်တိုင် ဦးစီးတဲ့ ဗုဒ္ဓဘာသာလူအိုရုံကို ဘာကြောင့် တည်ထောင်လို့မရမှာလဲ၊ ရအောင် တည်ထောင်မယ်။"

(Translation): "We Buddhist Burmese people are unfortunately stepping down from the stage and becoming a colony. Why can't we stand on our own two feet and establish a Buddhist nursing home run by ourselves? Let's do it."

— Oo Zun

Inspired by Christian homes for the elderly in Yangon, she established her inaugural elderly care facility named Mingun Buddhist Infirmary in Mingun, Sagaing Region, in 1915. She funded this initiative by selling her personal property. Situated near the renowned Mingun Bell, this facility marked the pioneering effort by a Burmese citizen to provide such care.

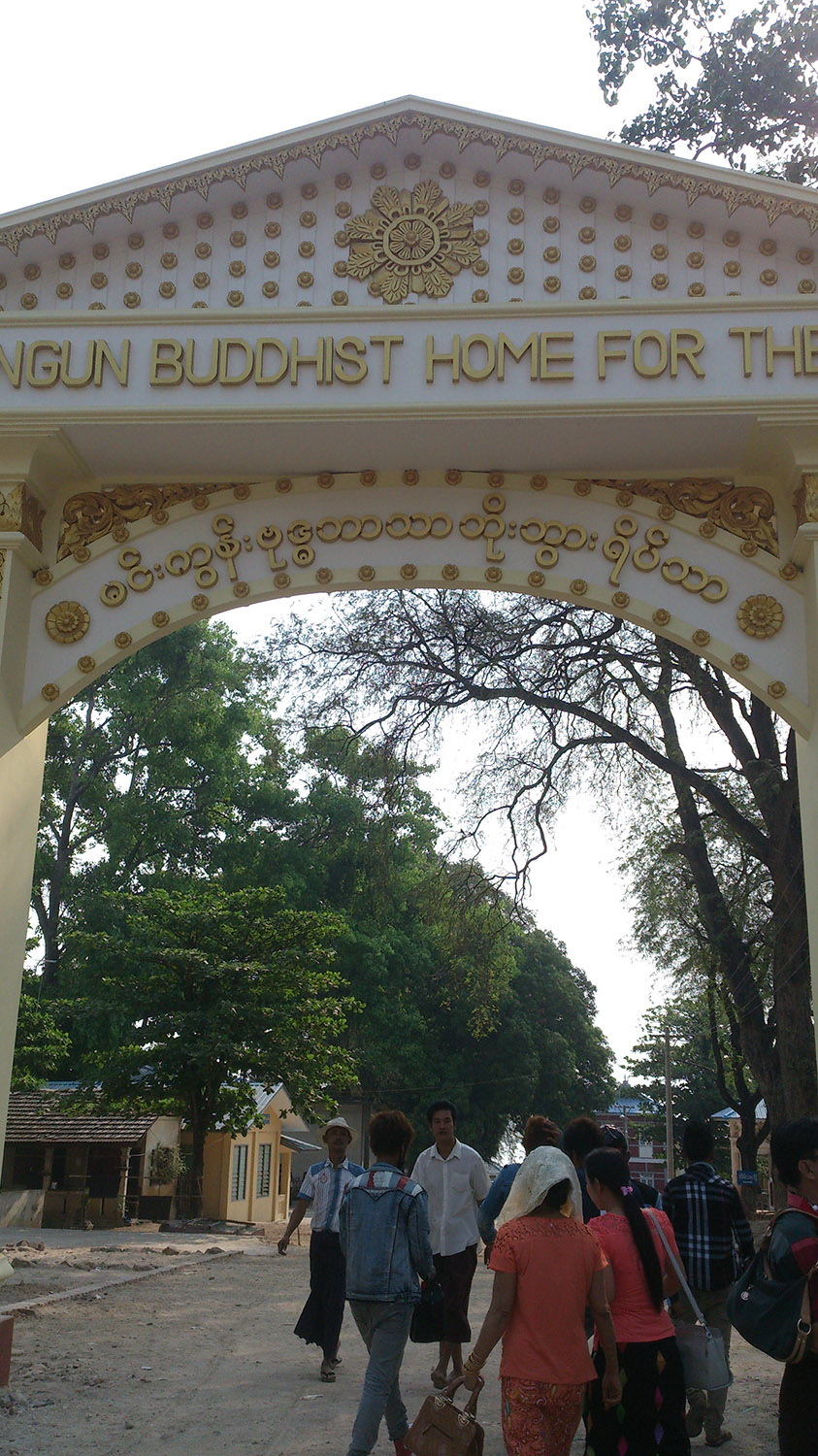
Mingun Buddhist Home for the Aged's Entry Gate

Between 1915 and 1937, she founded four more elderly care homes in locations including Thaton in Mon State, Paungde in Bago Region, Yangon, and Pakokku in Magwe Region. Throughout her life, she built several nursing homes and became a model of charity in Burmese history.

As a tribute to her contributions to public welfare, the British government awarded Oo Zun the TPS (Taing Kyo Pyi Kyo Saung), one of the country's highest civilian honors, along with official documents granting her lifelong, complimentary first-class transportation on rail or vessel across the nation. On 19 June 1936, the Prime Minister of Burma, U Nu along with government ministers including Education Minister Dr. Ba Maw and Forestry Minister Ba Pe, visited the Mingun Buddhist Infirmary. During their visit, the Prime Minister wrote a report praising Oo Zun for her diligent efforts in managing the Mingun Buddhist Infirmary.

At 63 years old, she relinquished her secular life to join the Buddhist Order as a nun at the Paungde Elderly Home. Following 28 years of dedicated service to the elderly, she died in Mingun in May 1944, aged 76. To honor her, a bronze statue of Oo Zun was erected at the Mingun Buddhist Infirmary.

Following Daw Oo Zun's passing, U Maung Gyi (BIA) assumed leadership of the association and diligently managed the Mingun Buddhist Infirmary. In 1952, the Mingun Buddhist Infirmary received official registration with the Department of Social Welfare, marking the beginning of its second-level support from the government. Then, on 4 February 1988, the Mingun Buddhist Infirmary underwent a name change to Mingun Buddhist Boe BwaYeiktha (Mingun Buddhist Home for the Aged).
