= COVID-19 pandemic in Pennsylvania =

Ongoing COVID-19 viral pandemic in Pennsylvania, United States

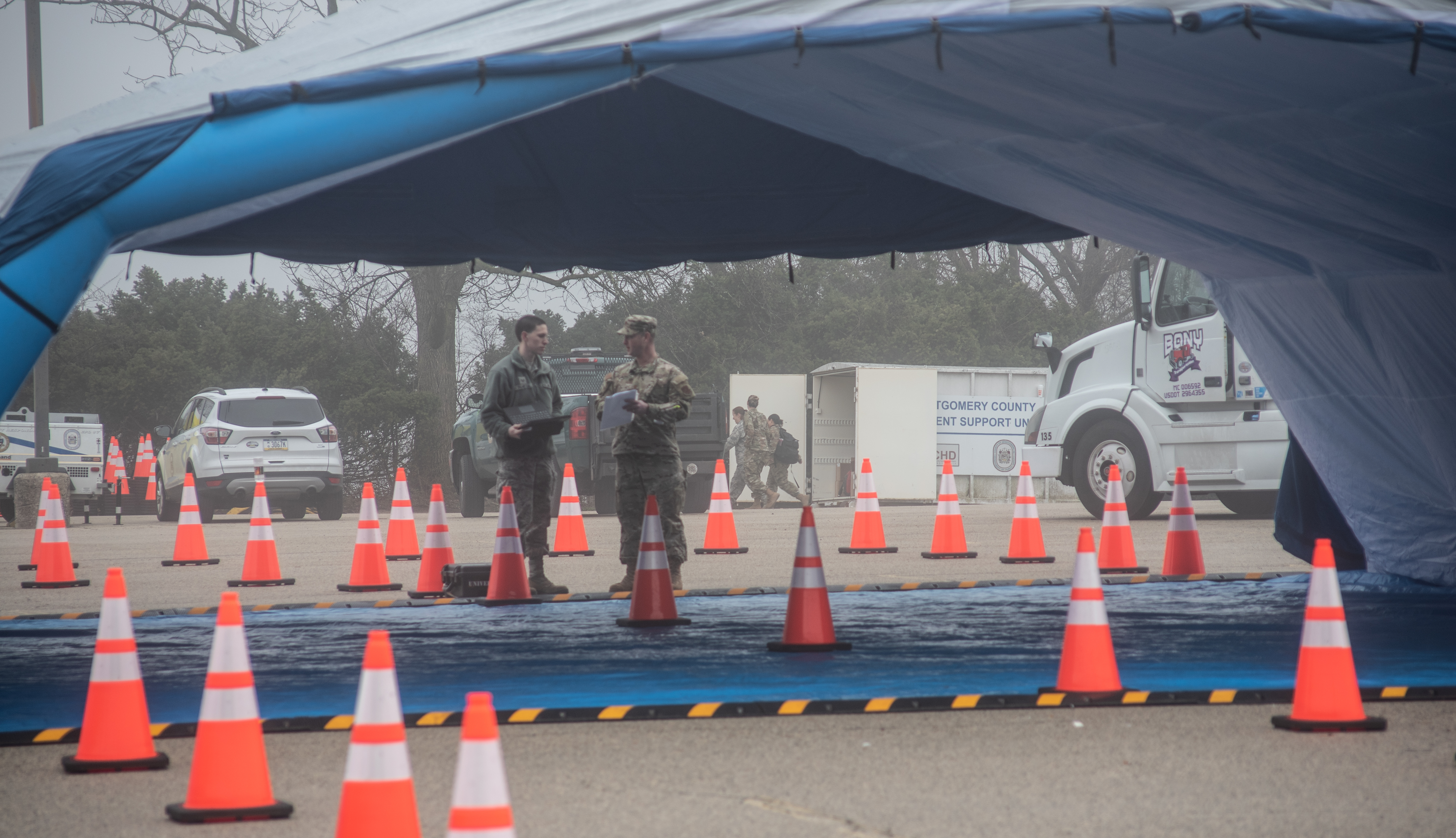
- Pennsylvania Air National Guard troops set up at a Montgomery County coronavirus test site
- Disease: COVID-19
- Pathogen: SARS-CoV-2
- Location: Pennsylvania, U.S.
- Index case: Delaware and Wayne counties
- Arrival date: March 6, 2020 (6 years, 8 months, 1 week and 5 days)
- Confirmed cases: 986,904
- Suspected cases: 186,760
- Hospitalized cases: 2,239 (5/9/21)
- Ventilator cases: 242 (5/9/21)
- Deaths: 28,864 (confirmed by DOH 9/20/21)

Government website
- www.health.pa.gov/topics/disease/Pages/Coronavirus.aspx

The COVID-19 pandemic was confirmed to have reached the U.S. state of Pennsylvania in March 2020. As of October 7, 2021, the Pennsylvania Department of Health has confirmed 1,464,264 cumulative cases and 29,814 deaths in the state. As of September 1, 2021, Pennsylvania has administered 6,238,812 partial vaccinations, and 5,983,128 full vaccinations.

== Timeline ==
=== March 2020 ===
- On March 6, Governor Tom Wolf reported Pennsylvania's first two confirmed cases of COVID-19 in Delaware County and in Wayne County. Both cases were related to travel, one to another state in the U.S. and another to Europe.
- On March 9, 4 new cases were confirmed, bringing the total to 10.
- On March 10, 2 new cases were confirmed, bringing the total to 12.
- On March 12, Governor Wolf implemented social distancing measures in Allegheny, Bucks, Chester, Delaware, and Montgomery counties, which urged nonessential businesses to close.
- On March 13, Governor Wolf announced that all Pennsylvania schools will be closed for at least two weeks. Additionally, park programs were cancelled.
- On March 16, Governor Wolf extended the social distancing measures across the entire state. Philadelphia Mayor Jim Kenney ordered nonessential businesses and city government to close for two weeks. Governor Wolf ordered bars and restaurants to close to dine-in customers in Allegheny, Bucks, Chester, Delaware, and Montgomery counties. Visitors were also prohibited at correctional facilities and nursing homes statewide. The Pennsylvania Turnpike stopped accepting cash or credit cards and implemented all-electronic tolling starting at 8 p.m.
- By March 17, there were 96 cases in the state; more than half of them were in the Philadelphia area with Montgomery County as the highest number. All Fine Wine & Good Spirits stores across the state closed at the end of the business day.
- On March 18, the Pennsylvania Department of Health reported the state's first death related to the virus, a patient at St. Luke's Fountain Hill campus in Northampton County.
- On March 19, Governor Wolf ordered a statewide closure of all "non-life sustaining businesses operations and services," with enforcement of this order going into effect at 12:01 am on Saturday, March 21. The PA Department of Education canceled all statewide assessments including the PSSA testing, Keystone exams, and the Pennsylvania Alternate System of Assessment (PASA) for the remainder of the 2019–2020 school year.
- On March 21, the department of health announced the state's second death as well as 103 new cases. The second death was in Allegheny County. Rachel Levine, the Secretary of Health for the Commonwealth of Pennsylvania, said during a press conference "A state-wide shelter in place was not out of the question."
- On March 22, 273 new cases were reported, bringing the total to 644. The sixth death occurred in Montgomery County. Mayor Kenney issued a stay-at-home order for the city of Philadelphia, set to take effect March 23 at 8:00 am.
- On March 23, Governor Wolf issued additional stay-at-home orders for Allegheny, Bucks, Chester, Delaware, Montgomery, Monroe, and a redundant order for Philadelphia County, to go into effect at 8:00 pm the same day.
- On March 24, Governor Wolf issued a stay-at-home order for Erie County starting at 8:00 pm the same day.
- On March 25, Governor Wolf issued a stay-at-home order for Lehigh and Northampton counties.
- On March 27, Governor Wolf issued a stay-at-home order for Berks, Butler, Lackawanna, Lancaster, Luzerne, Pike, Wayne, Westmoreland, and York counties.
- On March 28, Governor Wolf issued a stay-at-home order for Beaver, Centre, and Washington counties. Governor Wolf announced 533 new cases, bringing the statewide total to 2,751. The highest rise in cases was in Philadelphia County.

=== April 2020 ===
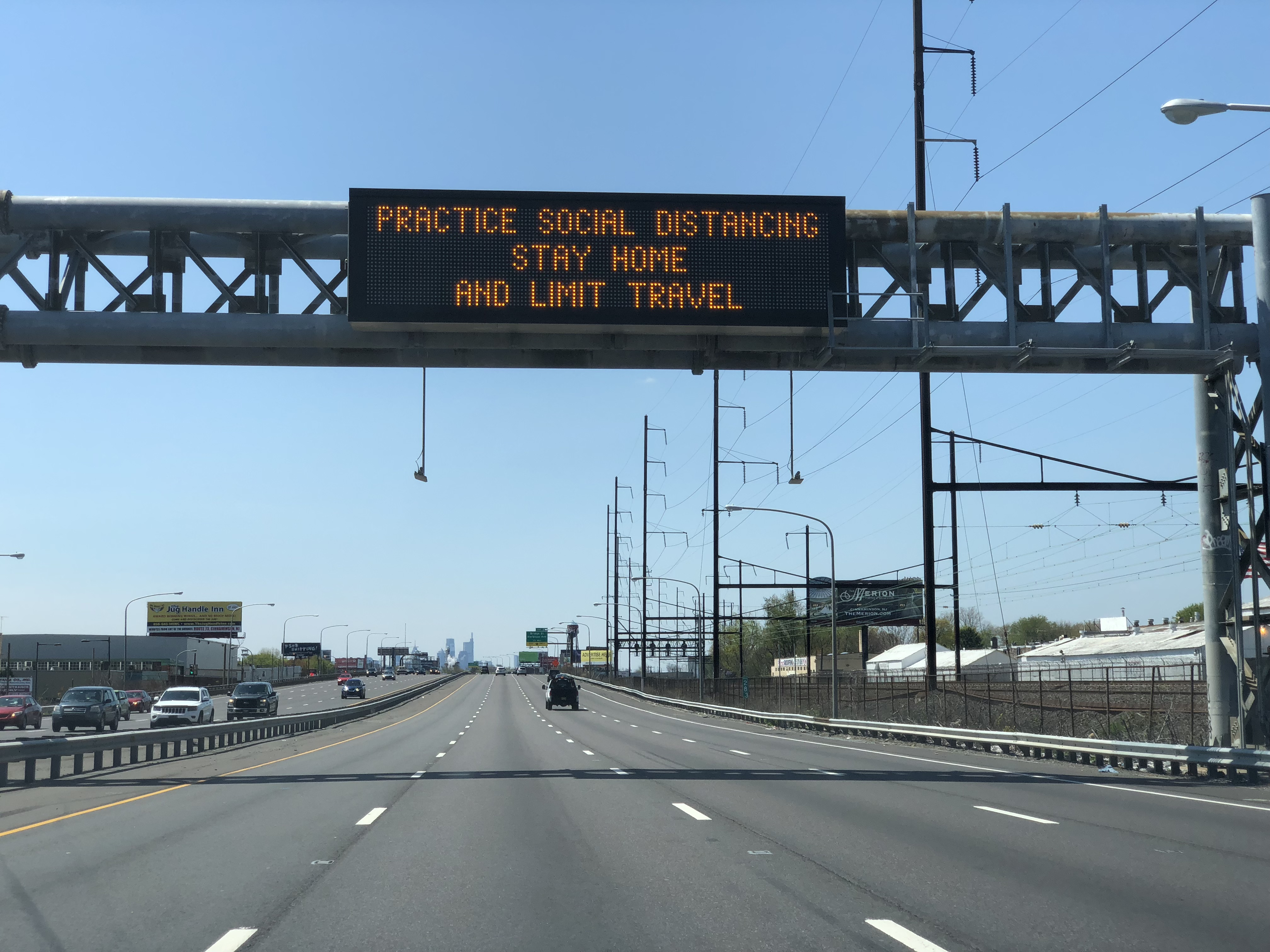
Variable-message sign along Interstate 95 in Philadelphia telling people to practice social distancing, stay home, and limit travel

- On April 1, Governor Wolf extended the stay-at-home order across the entire state effective that evening at 8:00 pm.
- On April 3, Governor Wolf asked Pennsylvanians to wear cloth face coverings in public. Philadelphia reduced recycling pickup to every two weeks due to staff shortages.
- On April 9, Governor Wolf officially ordered the closing of all Pennsylvania schools through the end of the academic school year. He stated that they will resume all classes through means of Google Classroom and other online classroom tools. He had not yet stated if the Class of 2020 graduations will be postponed or cancelled.
- On April 15, Health Secretary Levine issued an order requiring safety precautions for essential businesses (except for Hospitals).
- On April 17, Governor Wolf laid out a plan to provide relief for Pennsylvanians (Phase 1), gradually reopen the state (Phase 2), and recover from this situation (Phase 3). The state government used a three-phase color-coded plan to reopen the state. The first and most restrictive phase was the red phase, which included a stay-at-home order and only allowed essential businesses to be open. The second phase of the reopening process was the yellow phase, which called for aggressive mitigation and allowed some businesses to reopen while others must remain closed. The third and least restrictive phase was the green phase, which allowed most businesses to be open while following health guidelines.
- On April 19, Governor Wolf ordered employees and customers at essential businesses to wear face masks effective at 8 p.m.
- On April 20, hundreds of protesters marched on the Pennsylvania State Capitol building during an "Operation Gridlock Pennsylvania" event in Harrisburg in order to protest the stay-at-home order. The protest was organized by three groups, "Re-open Pennsylvania", "End the Lockdown Pennsylvania" and "Pennsylvania Against Excessive Quarantine" led in part by an Ohio-based Second Amendment rights activist named Chris Dorr.

=== May 2020 ===
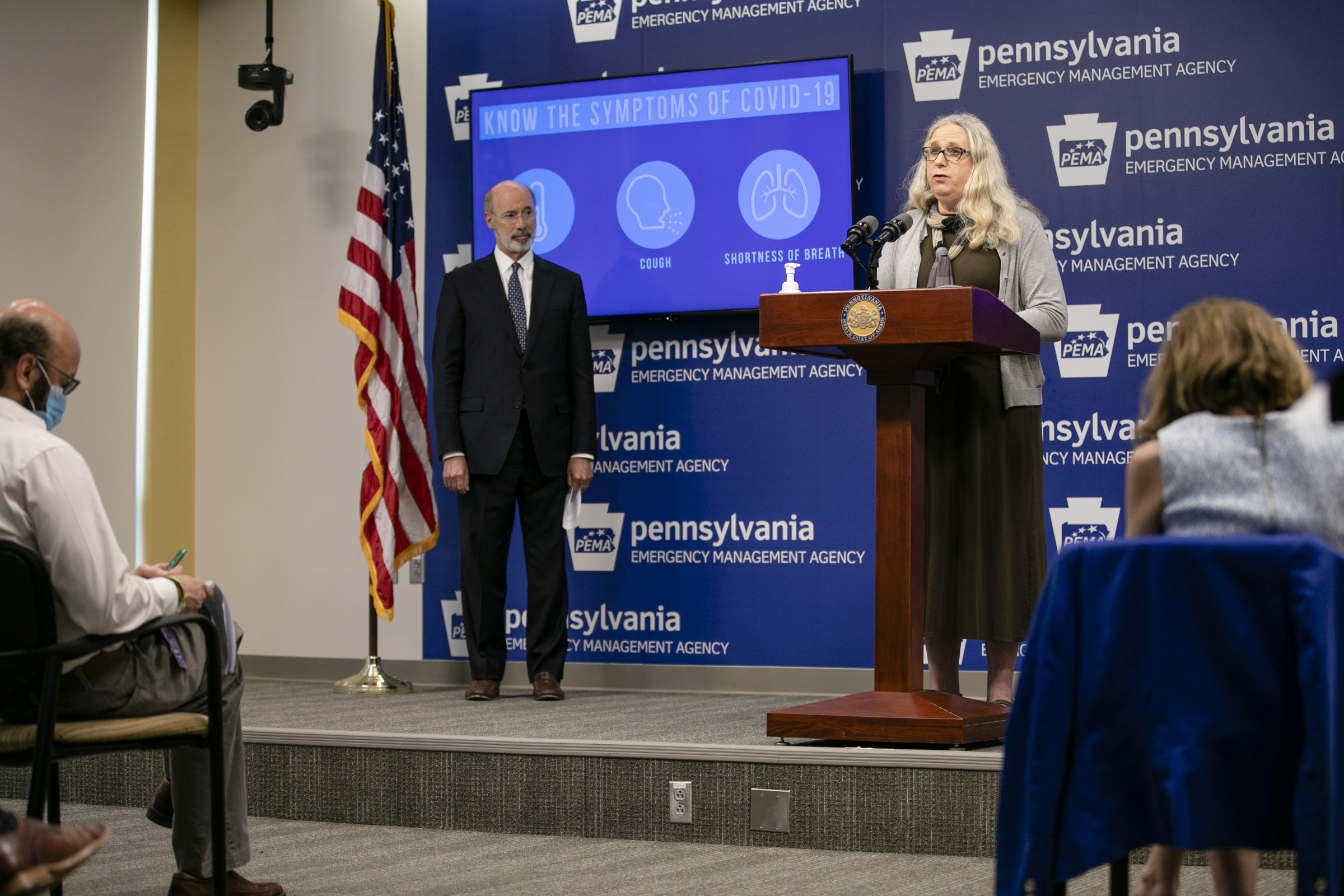
Governor Tom Wolf and Secretary of Health Rachel Levine at a press conference on May 29, 2020, announcing counties moving to a different phase in the state's reopening plan

- On May 1, public and private construction projects were allowed to resume. In addition, golf courses, marinas, guided fishing trips, and private campgrounds were allowed to reopen.
- On May 7, Governor Wolf extended the stay-at-home order until June 4 for counties in the red phase.
- On May 8, 24 counties entered the yellow phase, allowing some businesses to reopen. They are Bradford, Cameron, Centre, Clarion, Clearfield, Clinton, Crawford, Elk, Erie, Forest, Jefferson, Lawrence, Lycoming, McKean, Mercer, Montour, Northumberland, Potter, Snyder, Sullivan, Tioga, Union, Venango, and Warren.
- On May 15, 13 more counties entered the yellow phase: Allegheny, Armstrong, Bedford, Blair, Butler, Cambria, Fayette, Fulton, Greene, Indiana, Somerset, Washington, and Westmoreland.
- On May 22, 12 more counties entered the yellow phase: Adams, Beaver, Carbon, Columbia, Cumberland, Juniata, Mifflin, Perry, Susquehanna, Wayne, Wyoming, and York.
- On May 29, eight more counties entered the yellow phase: Dauphin, Franklin, Huntingdon, Lebanon, Luzerne, Monroe, Pike and Schuylkill. The first 18 counties to enter the green phase were Bradford, Cameron, Centre, Clarion, Clearfield, Crawford, Elk, Forest, Jefferson, Lawrence, McKean, Montour, Potter, Snyder, Sullivan, Tioga, Venango, and Warren.

=== June 2020 ===
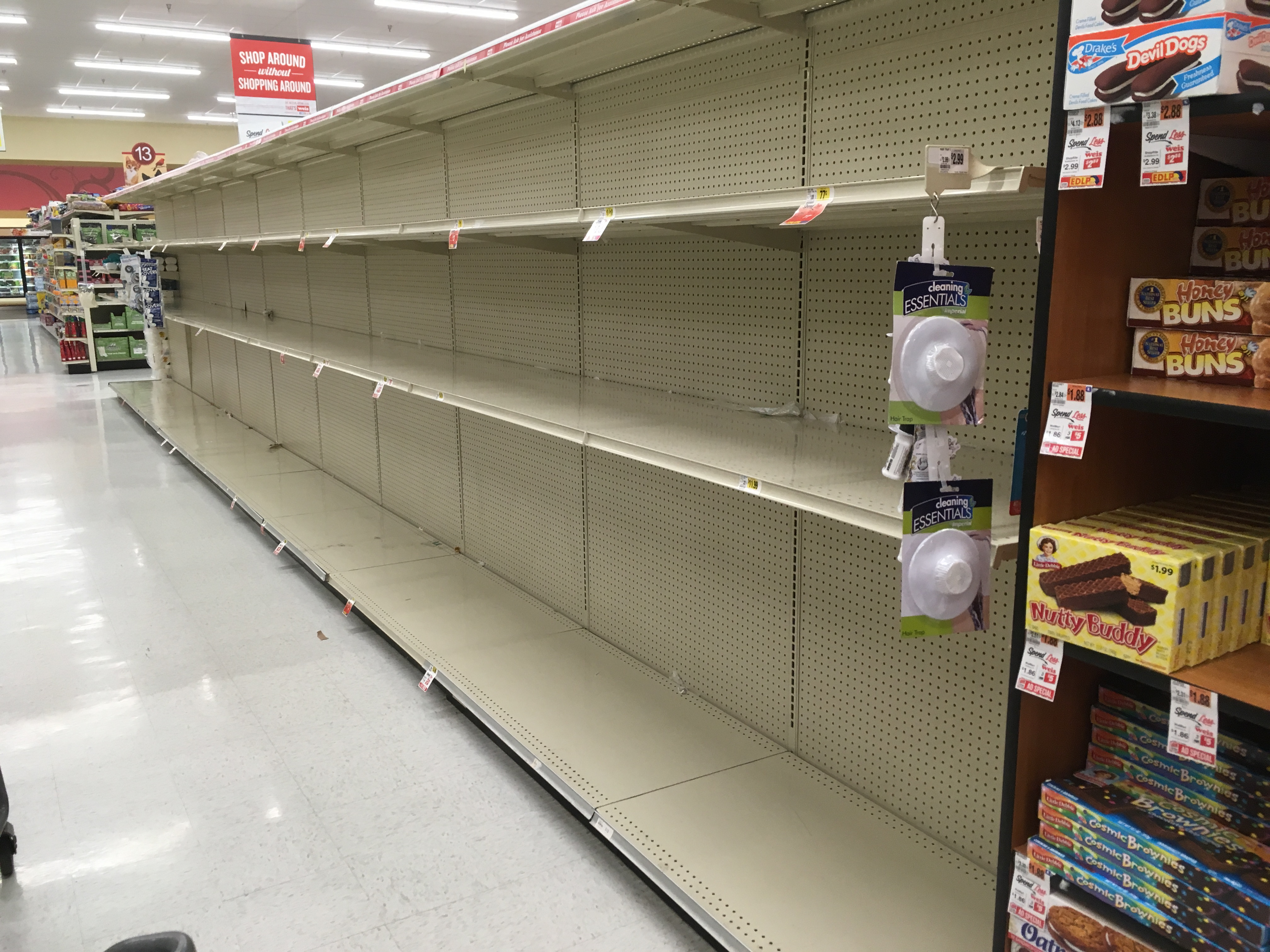
Empty toilet paper shelves during the COVID-19 pandemic at the Weis Markets in Huntingdon Valley

- On June 5, 16 more counties entered the green phase: Allegheny, Armstrong, Bedford, Blair, Butler, Cambria, Clinton, Fayette, Fulton, Greene, Indiana, Lycoming, Mercer, Somerset, Washington and Westmoreland. The last ten counties to enter the yellow phase were Berks, Bucks, Chester, Delaware, Lackawanna, Lancaster, Lehigh, Montgomery, Northampton, and Philadelphia. There are no remaining counties in the red phase.
- On June 12, 12 more counties entered the green phase: Adams, Beaver, Carbon, Columbia, Cumberland, Juniata, Mifflin, Northumberland, Union, Wayne, Wyoming, and York.
- On June 16, there had been 48 cases and 4 deaths at a York County nursing home.
- On June 19, eight more counties entered the green phase: Dauphin, Franklin, Huntingdon, Luzerne, Monroe, Perry, Pike, and Schuylkill.
- On June 24, Pennsylvania's Secretary of Health, Dr. Rachel Levine, announced that the state would partner with CVS Health to provide free COVID-19 tests to skilled nursing facilities across the state, to commence June 29.
- On June 26, 12 more counties entered the green phase: Berks, Bucks, Chester, Delaware, Erie, Lackawanna, Lancaster, Lehigh, Montgomery, Northampton, Philadelphia and Susquehanna.

=== July 2020 ===
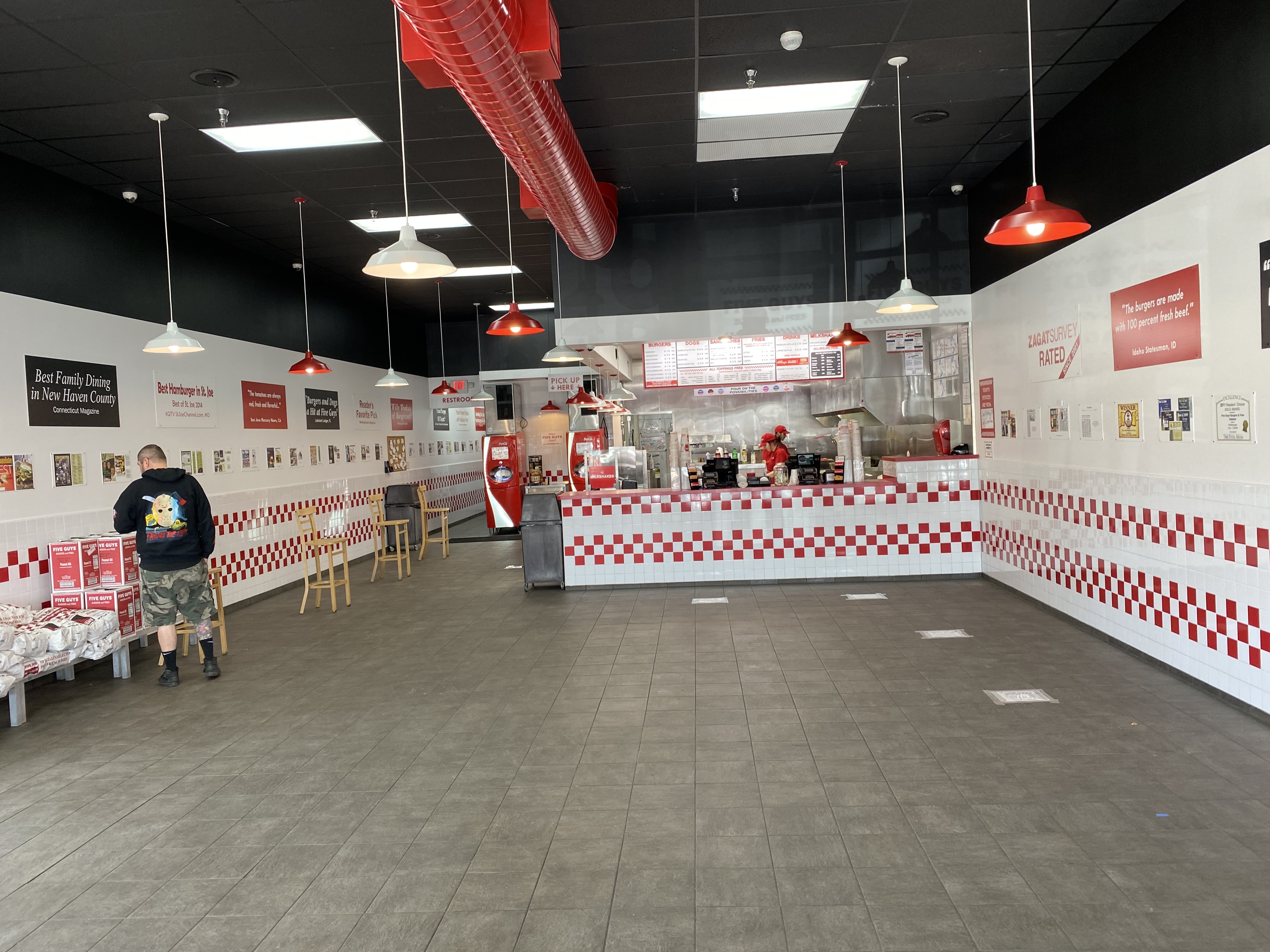
Dine-in area at the Five Guys restaurant in North Huntingdon Township closed due to the COVID-19 pandemic

- On July 1, Governor Wolf issued a statewide order mandating the wearing of face masks in all public spaces in the state.
- On July 2, the Pennsylvania Department of Health recommended that people who have traveled, or plan to travel, to a state with a high number of COVID-19 cases should quarantine for 14 days upon return to Pennsylvania.
- On July 3, Lebanon County became the final county to enter the green phase. Allegheny County, which is home to Pittsburgh, closed bars, restaurants, and casinos for a week, and cancelled gatherings of 25 people or more due to a rise in cases.
- On July 10, West Chester University announced that classes for the fall 2020 semester would be held online due to rising COVID-19 cases.
- On July 14, East Stroudsburg University of Pennsylvania also announced that classes for the fall 2020 semester will be held online.
- On July 15, Governor Wolf partially rolled back some of the lifted restrictions by imposing new restrictions due to a rise in cases. Restaurants were limited to 25 percent capacity for indoor dining, alcohol can only be served for on-premises consumption when purchased with a meal, telework must be implemented when possible, and indoor gatherings were limited to 25 people.
- On July 24, the Berks County Coroner office in Reading announced an autopsy revealed a local 26-day-old female baby that recently died tested positive for the virus and would investigate the death as a co-sleeping accident. The baby may be the state's youngest death from the virus.
- On July 25, two block parties at night in the Lawncrest neighborhood of Philadelphia were stopped by local police officers in an effort to stop viral transmission.

=== August 2020 ===
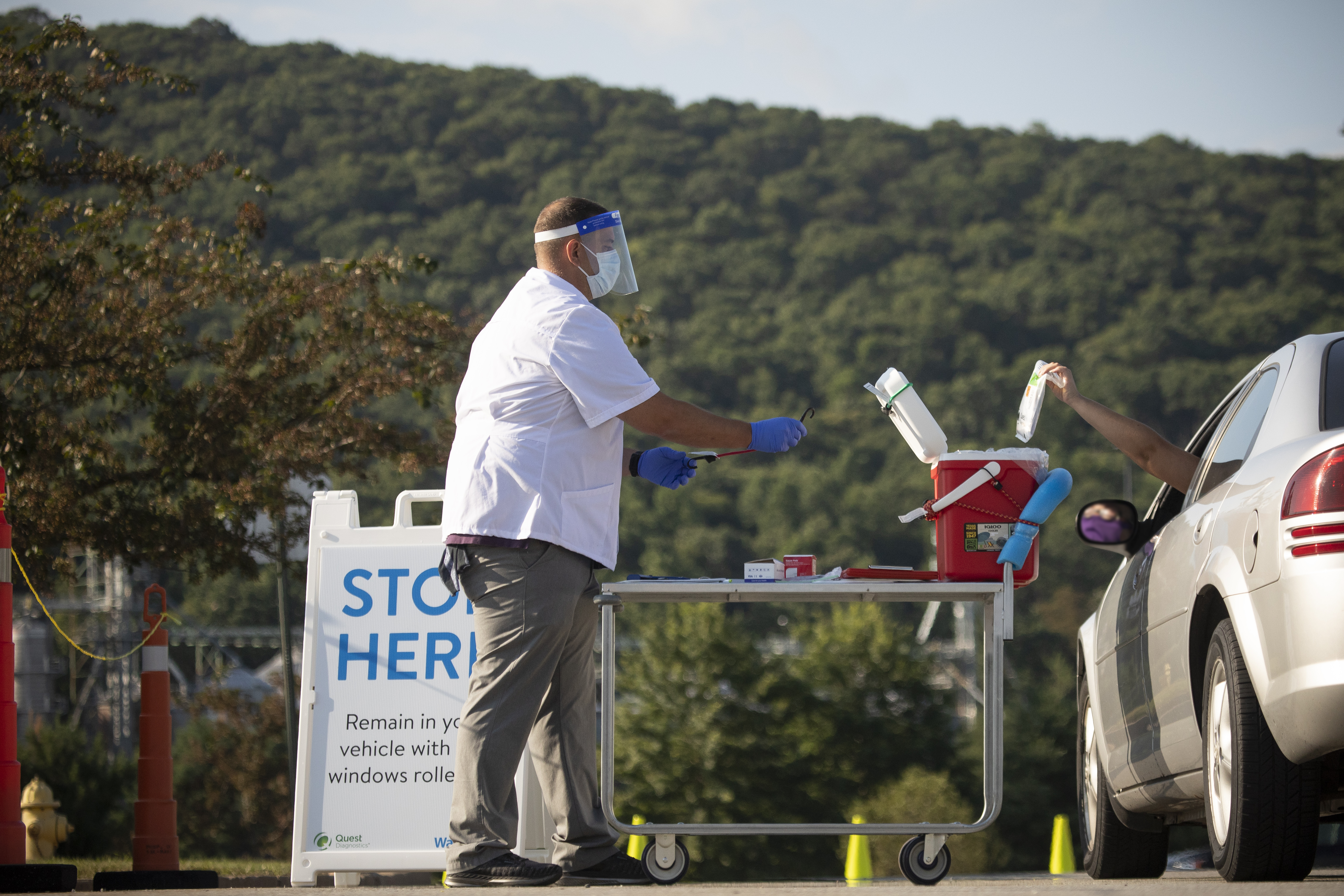
COVID-19 testing at the Walmart in Elizabethville

- On August 6, Governor Wolf recommended that interscholastic and recreational sports be suspended until January 1, 2021.
- On August 11, the University of Pennsylvania announced most undergraduates would be asked to stay home.
- As of August 11, 332 cases were reported at Brighton Rehabilitation and Wellness Center in Beaver County, with at least 73 deaths.
- On August 12, a surge in cases in rural Union County was the result of at least 19 cases at the federal prison at Lewisburg.
- On August 19, a large crowd of freshmen students at the University Park campus of Pennsylvania State University gathered; many of them did not practice social distancing or wearing masks. A petition calling for the freshmen who gathered in the crowd to be sent home gained close to 3,500 signatures.
- On August 21, the Pennsylvania Interscholastic Athletic Association approved for schools to play fall sports.
- On August 30, Temple University reverted to online instruction after 103 people tested positive. Contact tracing linked the outbreak to off-campus apartments and small social gatherings.
- On August 31, Bloomsburg University of Pennsylvania moved classes online for the remainder of the fall semester following a rise in COVID-19 cases during the first two weeks of students being on campus for classes.

=== September 2020 ===
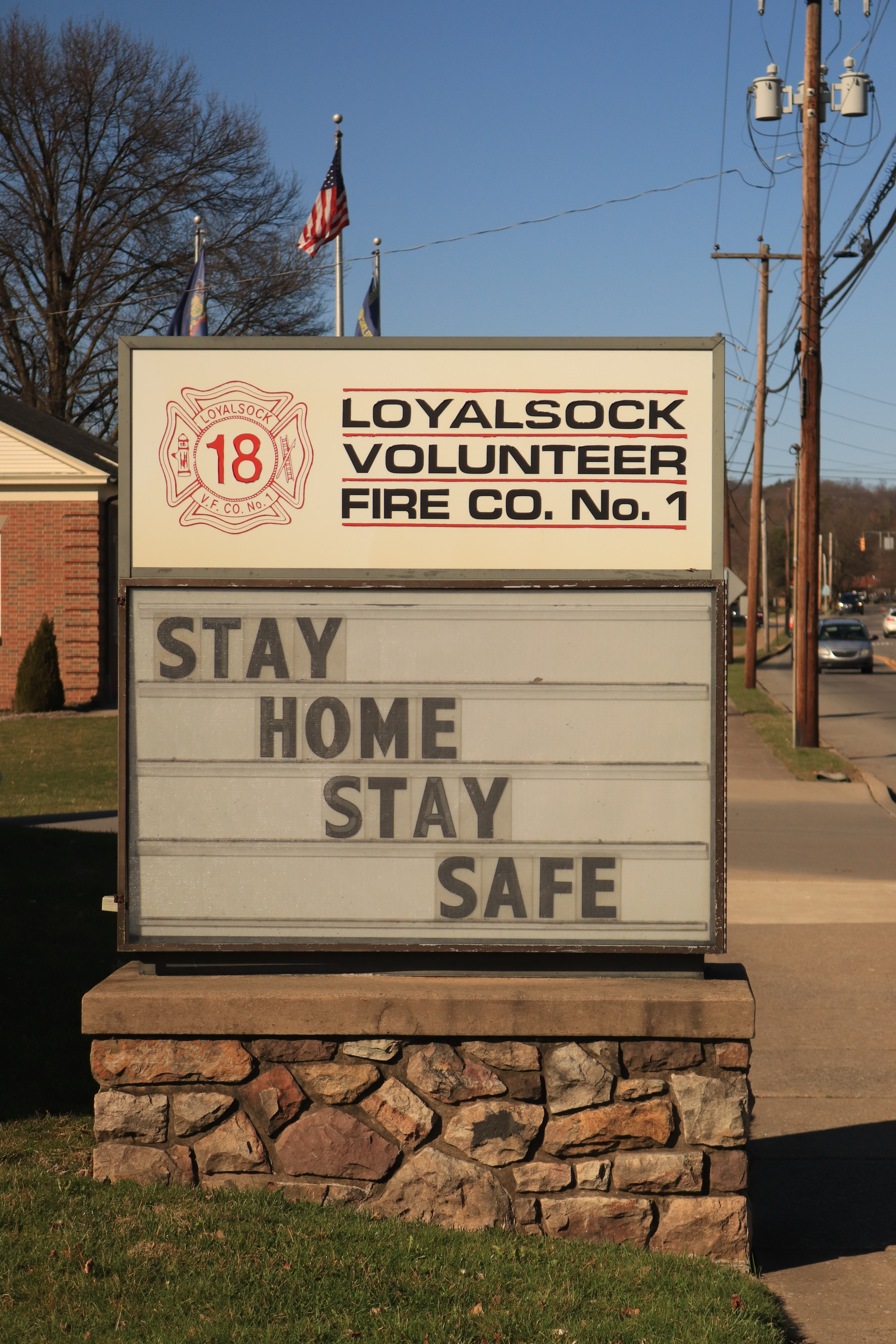
Sign at the Loyalsock Volunteer Fire Company near Williamsport urging people to stay home during the COVID-19 pandemic

- On September 1, Philadelphia's health commissioner told Temple University students, "You should assume that everyone around you is infected." Guidance for colleges in Philadelphia was revised "to recommend against gatherings of any size." Gettysburg College announced an all-student quarantine through at least the end of the week, after 25 of 348 students tested positive.
- On September 3, Temple University announced classes would be held online for the remainder of the fall semester following the COVID-19 outbreak at the campus.
- On September 11, the borough of Kutztown, which is home to Kutztown University of Pennsylvania, enacted an emergency ordinance that limited residential gatherings of unrelated people to 10 people or less and also mandated masks in public spaces when people were within 6 feet of others outside their household. Violators of the ordinance could be fined between $100 and $600.
- On September 13, the Pennsylvania Department of Health ceased reporting COVID-19 statistics on Sundays.
- On September 14, U.S. District Judge William S. Stickman IV ruled that Governor Wolf's pandemic restrictions - including the stay-at-home order, size limits on gatherings, and the order for non-essential businesses to close - were unconstitutional.
- On September 17, Governor Wolf and Health Secretary Levine signed orders that effective September 21, restaurants must stop alcohol sales for on-premises consumption at 11:00 pm and must remove alcohol from tables at midnight. The order was intended to discourage congregating in restaurants and reduce increases in COVID-19 cases among adults age 19–24.
- On September 21, restaurants were allowed to increase to 50 percent capacity for indoor dining after completing self-certification documents.
- On September 22, the COVID Alert PA smartphone app was launched to notify people if they were exposed to someone with COVID-19.

=== October 2020 ===
- On October 6, Governor Wolf increased crowd capacity limits for indoor and outdoor events including sporting events effective October 9. The limits were based on venue size and whether the venue was indoors or outdoors.

=== November 2020 ===
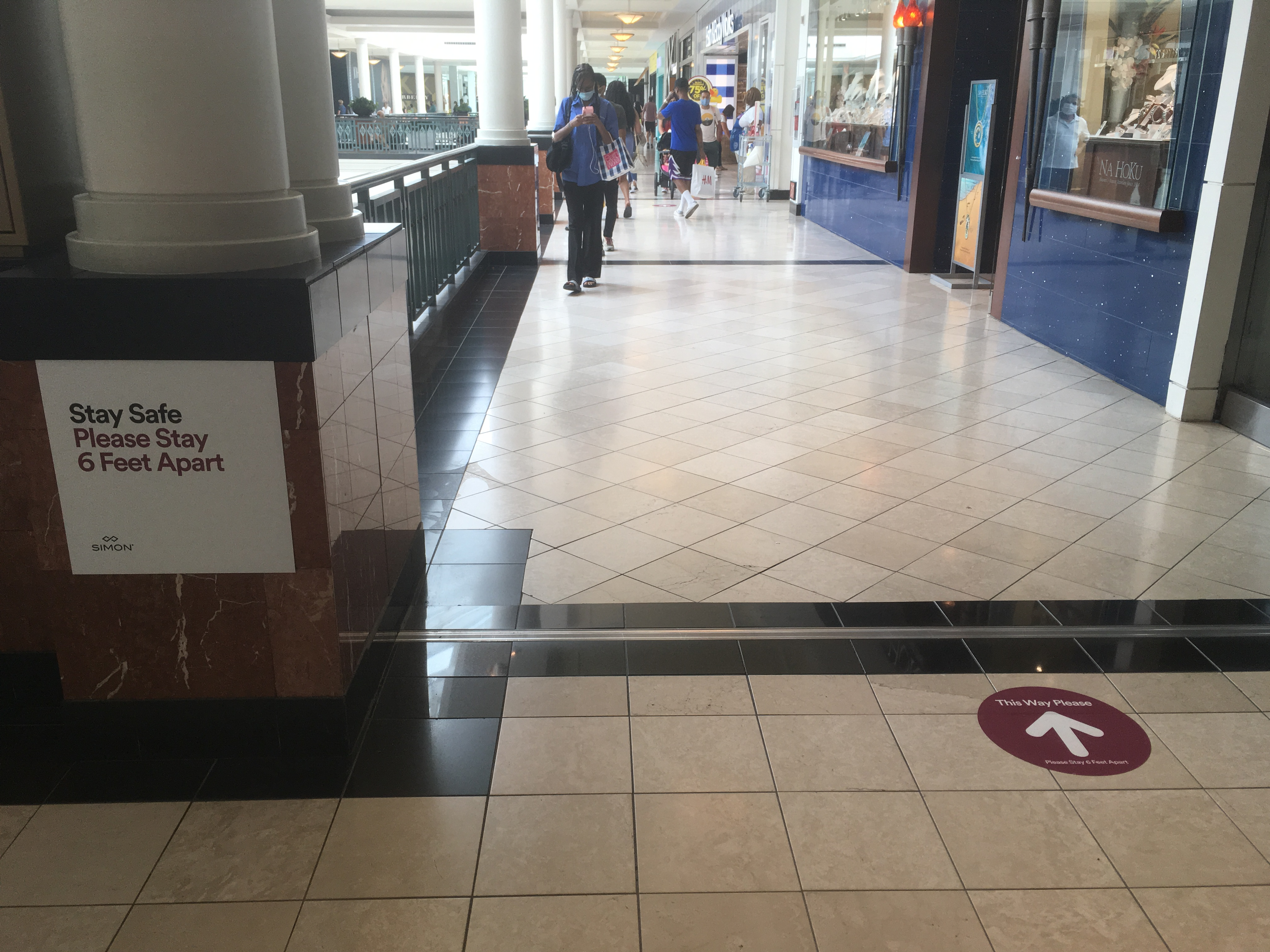
Floor decals and signs promoting one-way traffic and social distancing at the King of Prussia Mall in King of Prussia

- On November 13, health officials in Montgomery County ordered schools to go all-virtual for two weeks starting November 23 due to a rise in cases and hospitalizations.
- On November 16, the city of Philadelphia announced new restrictions due to a surge in cases, which were in place from November 20 until January 1, 2021. The restrictions included no indoor dining at restaurants, capacity limits at retail stores and religious institutions, the closure of gyms, libraries, and certain entertainment businesses, telework for office workers required unless it is not possible, no indoor gatherings, reduced size limits on outdoor gatherings, and no youth or school sports. Colleges, universities, and high schools were only allowed to offer online classes while elementary and middle schools were allowed in-person instruction following health guidelines.
- On November 17, Health Secretary Levine announced that anyone traveling to Pennsylvania must get a COVID-19 test within 72 hours of arrival or quarantine for 14 days, effective November 20. In addition, masks had to be worn in every indoor facility and any time people were indoors with other people from outside their household, even if they could remain socially distant.
- On November 19, Health Secretary Levine announced a three-phase plan to distribute a COVID-19 vaccine once it became available. The first phase would provide the vaccine to critical populations, including healthcare workers, first responders, critical workers, essential workers, people over the age of 65, and people living in congregate settings. The second phase would expand the vaccine to vulnerable populations and people with health conditions who may be a high risk of developing complications from the virus. The third phase will allow the remainder of the population to be vaccinated.
- On November 23, Health Secretary Levine announced a stay-at-home advisory as cases deaths and hospitalizations continued to increase. In addition, it was announced that alcohol sales at bars and restaurants would be suspended on Thanksgiving Eve, traditionally a big drinking holiday, with the suspension running from 5 p.m. November 25 to 8 a.m. November 26.

=== December 2020 ===
- On December 8 (announced December 9), Governor Wolf tested positive for COVID-19.
- On December 10, Governor Wolf announced several restrictions to slow the spread of the virus during the holiday season; these restrictions are in place from December 12 until January 4, 2021. During this time, indoor dining was prohibited at restaurants except for outdoor dining at 50% capacity, indoor operations at gyms were prohibited, indoor gatherings were limited to 10 people, outdoor gatherings were limited to 50 people, youth sports and in-person extracurricular activities were prohibited, businesses were limited to 50 percent capacity, and in-person entertainment including theaters, concert venues, museums, arcades, casinos, and bowling alleys were ordered to be closed.
- On December 14, the first doses of the Pfizer–BioNTech COVID-19 vaccine in Pennsylvania were issued to healthcare workers. Charmaine Pykosh, an acute care nurse in the surgical/intensive care unit at UPMC Presbyterian in Pittsburgh, received the first dose of the vaccine.

=== January 2021 ===
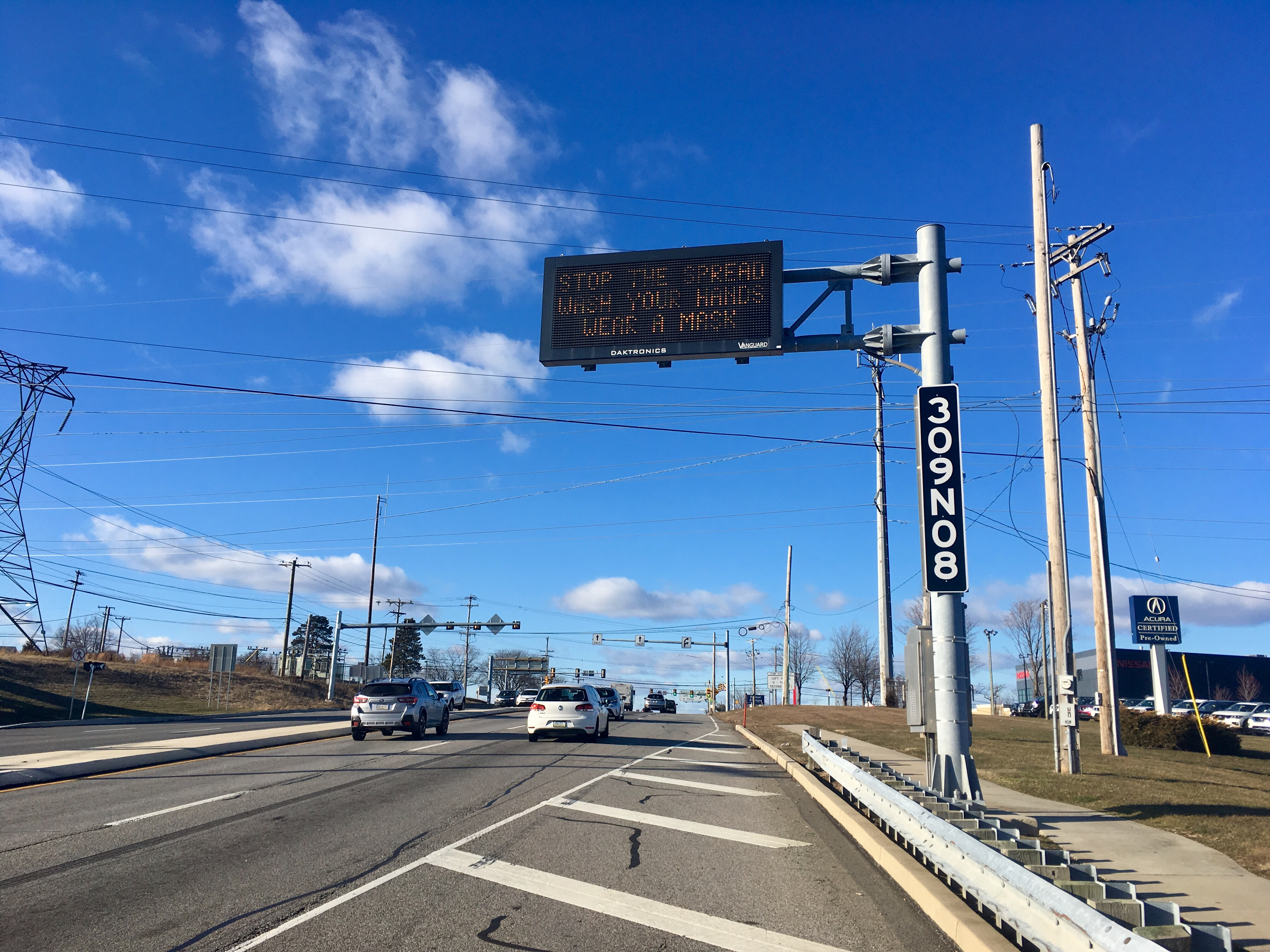
Variable-message sign along Pennsylvania Route 309 in Montgomery Township telling people to stop the spread of COVID-19 by washing hands and wearing a mask

- On January 8, the state announced updates to the phases in which the COVID-19 vaccine will be offered. In Phase 1A, the vaccine would be available to healthcare workers and nursing homes. In Phase 1B, the vaccine would be available to people over age 75 and essential workers including first responders, correction officers, postal workers, grocery store workers, teachers, school support staff, clergy, public transit workers, daycare workers, and manufacturing workers. In Phase 1C, the vaccine would be available to people age 65–74, pregnant women, people with existing health issues, and other essential workers including public safety workers, wastewater plant workers, elected government officials, the judiciary, legal service workers, media workers, and communications workers. In Phase 2, the vaccine would be available to the general population over age 16.
- On January 19, the state expanded COVID-19 vaccine eligibility to people over age 65 and people age 16–64 with health conditions that put them at higher risk.
- On January 23, Health Secretary Dr. Rachel Levine stepped down from her post after being nominated by President Joe Biden to be Assistant Secretary for Health for the United States Department of Health and Human Services.

=== February 2021 ===
- On February 12, Acting Health Secretary Alison Beam issued a new COVID-19 vaccine order intended to speed up the administration of the vaccine. Under this order, vaccine providers had to administer 80 percent of their first doses of the vaccine within seven days of receiving them and also provide an appointment card and schedule an appointment for the second dose of two-dose vaccines. In addition, vaccine providers needed both an online and phone-based registration system. Vaccine providers also had to record information on each vaccine administered and keep track of inventory levels.
- On February 17, the Pennsylvania Department of Health announced that several vaccine providers accidentally gave second doses of the Moderna COVID-19 vaccine as first doses, leading to a shortage of available vaccine doses and forcing upcoming vaccination appointments to be rescheduled or canceled.
- On February 19, Governor Wolf effectively extended the state's disaster declaration by signing a 90-day extension bill. This was the fourth renewal since the original declaration on March 6, 2020.

=== March 2021 ===
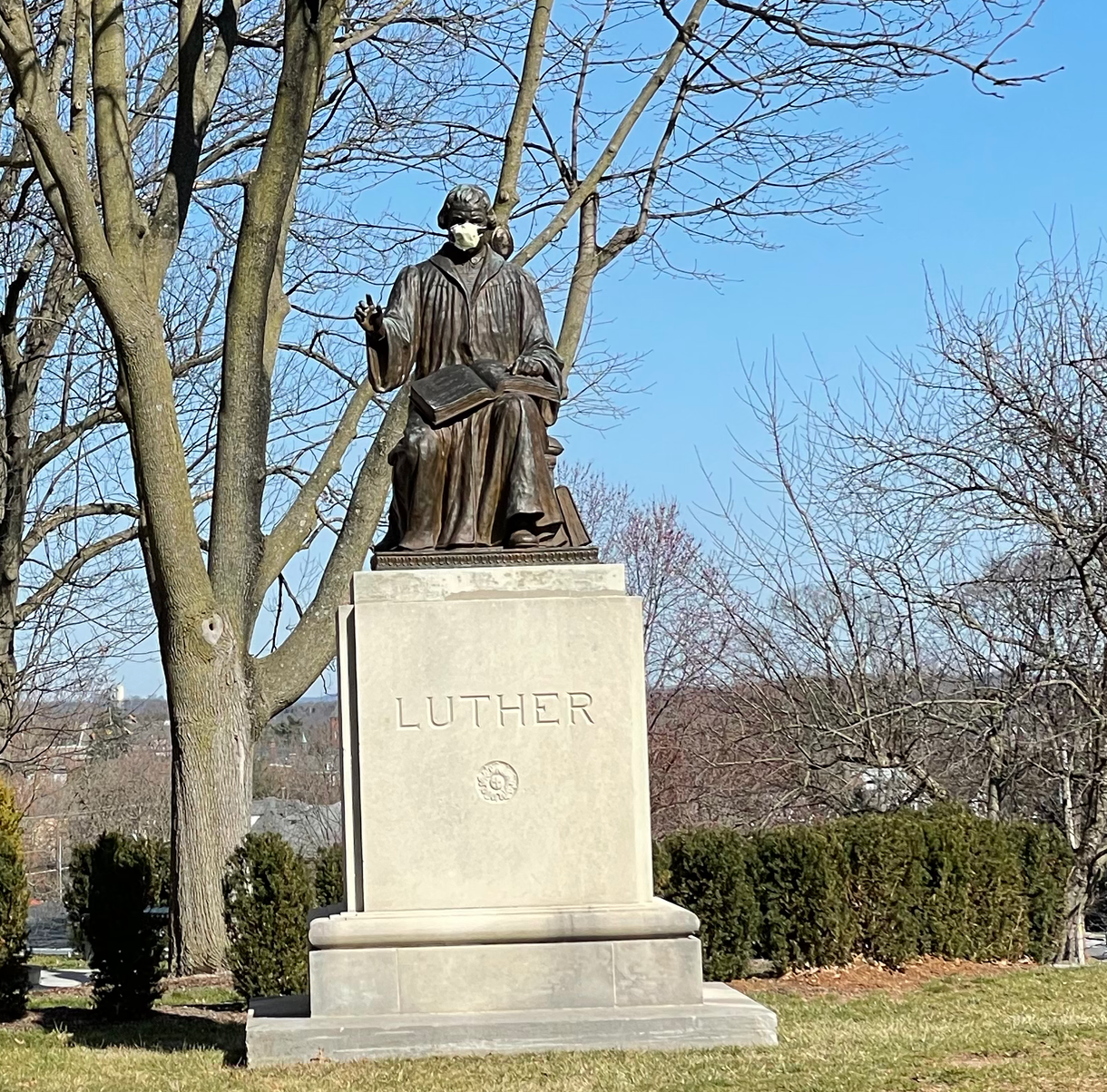
A statue of Martin Luther at United Lutheran Seminary-Gettysburg wearing a mask in March 2021.

- On March 1, Governor Wolf increased capacity limits for indoor and outdoor events, with indoor events limited to 15 percent maximum occupancy and outdoor events limited to 20 percent maximum occupancy. The state also eliminated the requirement that people traveling to Pennsylvania must get a COVID-19 test within 72 hours of arrival or quarantine for 14 days.
- On March 3, Governor Wolf announced plans to make the one-dose Janssen COVID-19 vaccine available to teachers and school staff in order to get students back into the classroom for in-person instruction.
- On March 15, Governor Wolf announced the lifting of more restrictions effective April 4. Restaurants are allowed to increase indoor dining to 75 percent capacity with self-certification or 50 percent capacity without self-certification. In addition, restaurants were allowed to resume bar service, alcohol was allowed to be served without the purchase of food, and the curfew for removing alcohol from tables was eliminated. Also effective April 4, personal services, gyms, and entertainment were allowed to increase to 75 percent capacity, indoor events were allowed to increase to 25 percent maximum occupancy, and outdoor events were allowed to increase to 50 percent maximum occupancy.
- On March 22, the state revised the mask mandate to allow fully vaccinated people to gather without masks or social distancing and to allow fully vaccinated people to gather without masks or social distancing with a single household that is not vaccinated but is considered low risk of severe disease from COVID-19.
- On March 31, the state announced expanded eligibility for the COVID-19 vaccine. Effective March 31, law enforcement officials, probation and parole staff, firefighters, and grocery store workers were eligible to receive the vaccine. The remainder of Phase 1B would be eligible on April 5, Phase 1C would be eligible on April 12, and all Pennsylvanians would be eligible on April 19. The expansion in vaccine eligibility was made possible as the pace of vaccinations picked up.

=== April 2021 ===
- On April 12, the state announced all Pennsylvania residents age 16 and older outside Philadelphia would be eligible to receive the COVID-19 vaccine effective April 13, six days earlier than originally planned.
- On April 27, the Pennsylvania Department of Health announced that it updated mask guidance for fully vaccinated people. Fully vaccinated people were no longer required to wear a mask outdoors unless they are in crowded spaces; unvaccinated people were still required to wear a mask in most situations.

=== May 2021 ===
- On May 4, the state announced that all COVID-19 mitigation orders would be lifted on May 31, with the exception of the mask mandate. The mask mandate would be lifted when 70% of residents age 18 and older are fully vaccinated.
- On May 11, Governor Wolf announced that gathering limits would increase to 50 percent capacity for indoor gatherings and to 75 percent capacity for outdoor gatherings effective May 17.
- On May 13, the state announced that fully vaccinated people would no longer be required to wear masks outdoors in crowds or in most indoor settings. Masks were still required for fully vaccinated people in crowded indoor settings including buses, airplanes, hospitals, prisons, and homeless shelters.
- On May 27, Acting Health Secretary Beam announced that the state mask mandate would be fully lifted on June 28 or when 70% of residents age 18 and older were fully vaccinated, whichever came first.

=== June 2021 ===
- On June 10, the Pennsylvania State Senate voted in favor of a resolution terminating the disaster emergency declaration issued by Governor Wolf; the Pennsylvania House of Representatives voted in favor of it on June 8. The Pennsylvania State Senate also voted in favor of a bill to keep waivers of state regulations in place through September 30, 2021.
- On June 28, the mask mandate in Pennsylvania was lifted. Masks were still required on planes, trains, buses, and public transportation. Organizations, businesses, and healthcare providers could still require masks at their discretion.

=== July 2021 ===
- On July 22, the city of Philadelphia recommended people wear masks in indoor public spaces, regardless of vaccination status, due to a rise in cases among unvaccinated people including children.
- On July 29, health officials in Montgomery County recommended all teachers, students, staff, and visitors wear masks in school buildings when the new school year begins, regardless of vaccination status, in accordance with updated CDC guidance.

=== August 2021 ===
- On August 4, Pennsylvania State University announced that students, staff, and visitors would be required to wear masks in indoor spaces on all of its campuses.
- On August 6, the University of Pennsylvania announced students and staff would be required to wear masks indoors with some exceptions.
- On August 10, Governor Wolf announced that about 25,000 employees of state prisons and state healthcare and congregate care facilities were required to be fully vaccinated by September 7 or take weekly COVID-19 tests.
- On August 13, Montgomery County announced staff and visitors to county government buildings would be required to wear masks, while recommending all people regardless of vaccination status wear masks in indoor public places.
- On August 31, Governor Wolf announced that students, teachers, and staff in all public and private K-12 schools and childcare facilities would be required to wear masks effective September 7 amid a rise in cases caused by the SARS-CoV-2 Delta variant.

=== September 2021 ===
- On September 3, officials in Montgomery County announced that effective September 6, people would be recommended to wear masks outdoors if they cannot practice social distancing regardless of vaccination status. This recommendation was made after Montgomery County was in the high level of community transmission of COVID-19 for two weeks.

=== November 2021 ===
- On November 8, Governor Wolf announced that school districts will be allowed to modify or end the mask mandate for K-12 students effective January 17, 2022. The mask mandate will remain in place for early learning and childcare facilities.
- On November 10, a state court threw out the mask mandate for K-12 schools issued by Acting Health Secretary Beam, stating she lacked authority to issue a mandate. The Wolf administration immediately filed an appeal to the Pennsylvania Supreme Court.
- On November 16, Commonwealth Court Judge Christine Fizzano Cannon ruled that the statewide mask mandate for K-12 schools and childcare facilities must expire December 4.
- On November 30, the Pennsylvania Supreme Court ruled 5-1 that the mask mandate for K-12 schools and childcare facilities remain in place as it considered the appeal to the lawsuit that overturned the mandate.

=== December 2021 ===
- On December 10, the Pennsylvania Supreme Court upheld the lower court ruling that threw out the mask mandate for K-12 schools issued by Acting Health Secretary Beam.
- On December 22, Temple University announced that classes for the first three weeks of the spring 2022 semester will be held virtually due to the rise in COVID-19 cases caused by the SARS-CoV-2 Omicron variant.

=== January 2022 ===
- On January 6, Lehigh University announced that classes during the first week of the spring 2022 semester would mostly be held virtually while also requiring returning students to be tested for COVID-19.
- On January 24, the Pennsylvania Department of Corrections announced all in-person visits to state prisons will be suspended from January 27 to February 28 due to a surge of COVID-19 cases.

== Government response ==
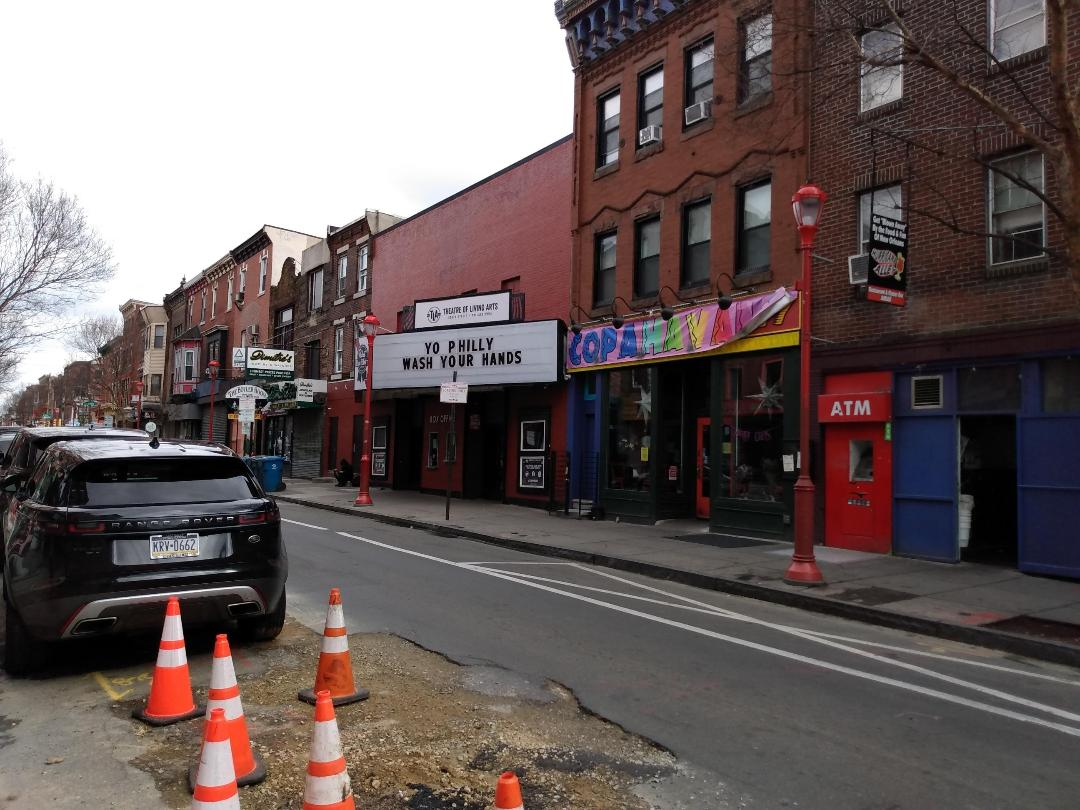
The TLA on March 17, 2020, during the City of Philadelphia's closure during the COVID-19 pandemic

Initially, Governor Wolf implemented social distancing measures in Bucks, Chester, Delaware, and Montgomery counties in the Philadelphia suburbs along with Allegheny County in the Pittsburgh area, which urged non-essential businesses operations and services to close, such as malls, movie theaters, and casinos. Essential businesses such as gas stations, grocery stores, and pharmacies remained open. Starting March 16, 2020, bars and restaurants were ordered to close to dine-in customers in those counties. In addition, non-essential travel was discouraged. A no visitor policy was implemented for correctional facilities and nursing homes statewide.

Social distancing measures rapidly spread to the rest of the state. On March 16, 2020, the social distancing measures were extended to the entire state, while Philadelphia Mayor Jim Kenney ordered nonessential businesses and city government to close for two weeks. The Pennsylvania Turnpike Commission announced that cash or credit cards would not be accepted at toll plazas along the Pennsylvania Turnpike system starting at 8 p.m. on March 16, 2020. All tolls were collected electronically by E-ZPass or toll-by-plate. The all-electronic tolling was intended to be temporary, but in June 2020 the move to all-electronic tolling became permanent, with toll collectors laid off.

On March 17, 2020, all Fine Wine & Good Spirits stores across the state closed at the end of the business day. SEPTA Regional Rail trains in the Philadelphia area began operating on an enhanced Saturday schedule for two weeks due to reduced ridership and staffing. SEPTA offered refunds for unused and partially used passes.

On March 19, 2020, Governor Wolf ordered all non-life sustaining businesses to close. The state's department of education announced that all statewide assessments would be canceled for the remainder of the 2019–2020 school year.

On March 22, 2020, Philadelphia Mayor Jim Kenney issued a stay-at-home order for the city, set to take effect the following day at 8:00 am. On March 23, 2020, Governor Wolf issued additional stay at home orders for seven counties: Allegheny, Bucks, Chester, Delaware, Montgomery, Monroe, and a redundant order for Philadelphia County, to go into effect at 8:00 pm the same day. Stay-at-home orders were issued for Erie County on March 24, 2020; Lehigh and Northampton counties on March 25, 2020; Berks, Butler, Lackawanna, Lancaster, Luzerne, Pike, Wayne, Westmoreland, and York counties on March 27, 2020; Beaver, Centre, and Washington counties on March 28, 2020; and the entire state on April 1, 2020.

The Pennsylvania Department of Transportation extended expiration dates as a result of the pandemic. The expiration dates of driver licenses, identification cards, and learner's permits that were scheduled to expire from March 16, 2020, to August 31, 2020, were extended to August 31, 2020. The expiration dates for commercial driver licenses and commercial learner's permits that were scheduled to expire from March 16, 2020, to March 31, 2021, were extended to March 31, 2021.

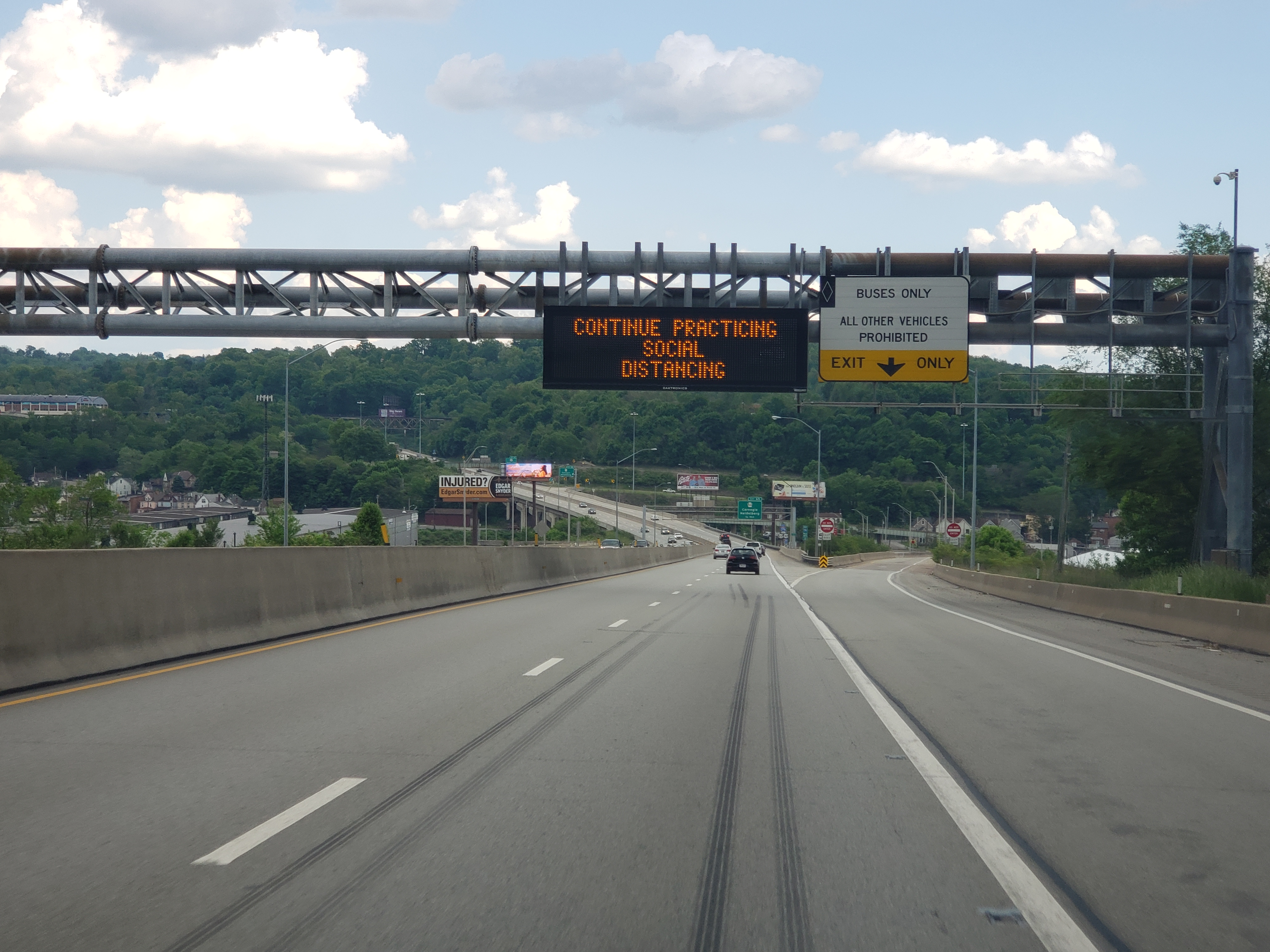
Variable-message sign along Interstate 376 in Carnegie, just outside of Pittsburgh, telling people to continue social distancing

== Impact on economy ==
On March 19, 2020, Pennsylvania governor Tom Wolf ordered a closure of all non-life-sustaining businesses in the state to close physical locations in order to slow the spread of the virus. Following the closure and into the second week of April 2020, 1.7 million residents had filed unemployment claims. The most affected sectors included the construction sector and the accommodation and food services sector.

As of February 2021, over 2 million unemployment claims had been filed in the state. 1.1 million of those had been approved and paid.

== Impact on communities ==
Pennsylvania businesses were impacted by COVID-19 beginning early in the pandemic. All non-life-sustaining businesses were ordered to close by 8 pm March 19, 2020 by Gov. Tom Wolf. As a result, restaurants, small businesses, theaters, galleries, and performance spaces were temporarily shuttered to stem the spread of the virus. The economic impact of closures and related measures became apparent later in the year. GDP decreased by 34% statewide between Q1 and Q2 2020, and employment decreased by 503,600 (8.2%) jobs between February and December 2020. Beginning in March 2020, remote work was advised where possible.

In an effort to aid small and locally owned businesses, Pennsylvania legislators created funds for proprietors. The Statewide Small Business Assistance program made $225 million available for small businesses as part of the $2.6 billion CARES Act. Businesses, which apply through Community Development Financial Institutions, were eligible for grants of $5,000 to $50,000. Wolf's office reported $192 million has been provided through grants to more than 10,000 businesses. In October 2020, another $96 million was allocated to more than $5,000 businesses. As of February 2021, businesses could operate at 75% capacity, and casinos, malls, theaters, gyms, spas, salons and indoor dining at restaurants were further restricted to 50% capacity.

Gatherings for parties, funerals, or weddings were limited in number. As of November 2020, maximum occupancy limits (including staff) were set for indoor and outdoor settings. These range from no more than 500 people in an indoor space with a maximum occupancy of more than 10,000, 10% of 2,000 maximum occupancy, 5% of 2,000-10,000 maximum occupancy. Outdoor events were limited to 5% or up to 2,500 with a maximum occupancy of more than 10,000, 15% of 2,000 maximum occupancy, and 10% of 2,000-10,000 maximum occupancy.

In October 2020, lawmakers introduced "Save the Stages" legislation (PA House Bill 2894) designed to provide $200 million of the CARES Act to performance venues or associated businesses impacted by COVID-19.

As gyms and recreational spaces were shuttered, Pennsylvanians took to outdoor trails. A survey of Pennsylvania Environmental Council's trails' operators reported an increase of trail usage by 100% to 200% in spring 2020 as stay-at-home orders were implemented. Increased usage delayed planned projects and strained resources for management of the trail systems.

In November 2020, Gov, Wolf issued a travel order requiring those arriving in Pennsylvania from another state or country, or residents returning to the state, to test negative to a COVID-19 test or to quarantine for 10 days after arrival.

== Impact on education ==
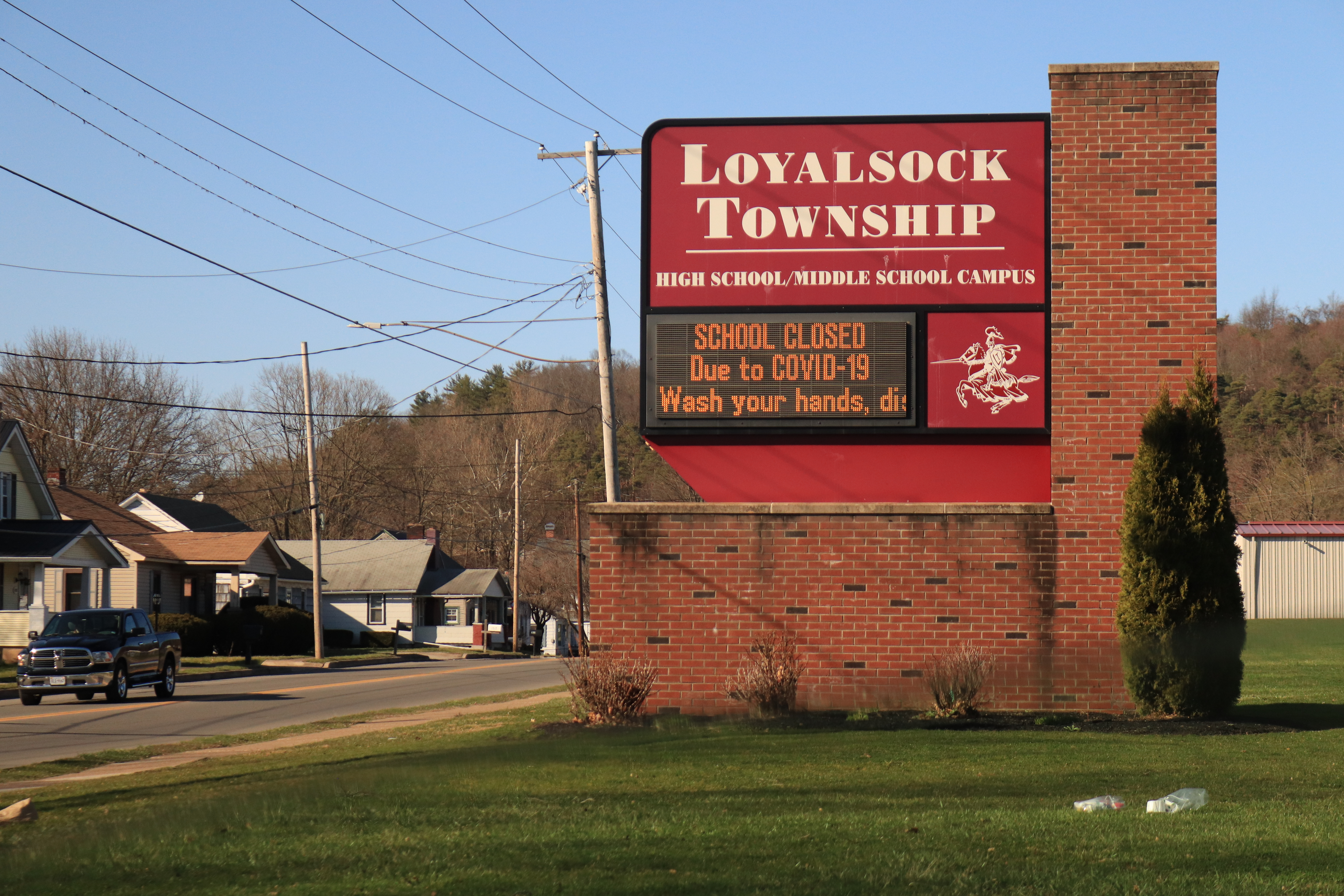
An electronic sign announces the closure of Loyalsock Township High School near Williamsport due to COVID-19

On March 13, 2020, Governor Wolf ordered all Pennsylvania schools to close for at least two weeks. The Pennsylvania Department of Education canceled all statewide school assessments including the PSSA testing, Keystone exams, and the Pennsylvania Alternate System of Assessment (PASA) for the remainder of the 2019–2020 school year. On April 9, 2020, Governor Wolf ordered all Pennsylvania schools to remain closed through the end of the academic school year, with schools holding all classes through means of Google Classroom and other online classroom tools. In August 2020, Governor Wolf set forth criteria to reopen schools for the 2020–2021 school year based on community transmission of COVID-19. In counties with low transmission, schools are recommended to reopen with full in-person instruction or hybrid instruction using a mix of in-person and virtual learning. In counties with moderate transmission, schools are recommended to reopen with hybrid instruction or all-virtual learning. In counties with substantial transmission, schools are recommended to reopen with all-virtual learning. On November 13, 2020, Montgomery County health officials ordered schools to go all-virtual for two weeks starting November 23, 2020 due to a rise in cases and hospitalizations. In January 2022, many schools temporarily switched to virtual learning due to an increase in COVID-19 cases among students and staff caused by the SARS-CoV-2 Omicron variant.

In March 2020, many colleges and universities throughout Pennsylvania suspended in-person classes and moved to virtual learning in wake of the COVID-19 pandemic. Some universities such as West Chester University, East Stroudsburg University of Pennsylvania, and the University of Pennsylvania continued to utilize virtual learning for most classes for the fall 2020 semester. Other universities such as Bloomsburg University of Pennsylvania and Temple University started the fall 2020 semester with in-person classes but reverted to virtual learning after a rise in COVID-19 cases on campus. Temple University and Lehigh University will start the spring 2022 semester virtually due to the rise in COVID-19 cases caused by the SARS-CoV-2 Omicron variant.

As elsewhere in the U.S., the pandemic has placed significant economic stress on public school districts across the state of Pennsylvania. Despite funding from the CARES ACT, many districts had to increase taxes, make budgets, or draw from reserves, or some combination of the three strategies. Many of the districts facing the most difficult economic challenges were also those that serve low-income areas.

== Impact on voting ==
in 2019, PA General Assembly's Act 77 amended voting laws in the state to allow for "no excuse" mail in ballots, making mail-in ballots accessible to a greater number of residents, and aligning with similar practices in 31 states. In March 2020 with the passage of 2020 Act 12, the primary election was postponed to June 2, 2020, to allow for mail in ballots and pre-canvassing.

Immediately before the November 2020 U.S. Presidential Election, 27% of likely voters identified the virus as "the most pressing issue for the state." COVID-19 led to a surge in registrations for mail-in voting for the general election. In response to the pandemic, certain modifications were made to mail-in voting. Prepaid return postage was provided for both mail-in and absentee ballots in the general election. Additionally, the deadline for receipt of mail-in ballots was extended to November 6, 2020, if the ballot was postmarked by November 3, 2020.

The three-day extension was petitioned in the state Supreme Court in September 2020, and stated to be based on the delay in US Postal Service deliveries due to the pandemic. Following legal challenge, the Pennsylvania Supreme Court upheld the extended period of receipt of mail in ballots. In late October 2020, Kathryn Boockvar, Secretary of the Commonwealth of Pennsylvania, ordered the mail in ballots received after November 3 to be kept separate from those received prior due to pending legislation in the US Supreme Court. Several appeals were made to the US Supreme Court regarding the recent legislative decisions. The Court declined to hear the cases.

== Impact on sports ==
Most of the state's sports teams were affected. Several leagues began postponing or suspending their seasons starting March 12, 2020. Major League Baseball cancelled the remainder of spring training on that date, and on March 16, 2020, they announced that the season will be postponed indefinitely, after the recommendations from the CDC to restrict events of more than 50 people for the next eight weeks, affecting the Philadelphia Phillies and Pittsburgh Pirates. Also on March 12, 2020, the National Basketball Association announced the season would be suspended for 30 days, affecting the Philadelphia 76ers. In the National Hockey League, the season was suspended for an indefinite amount of time, affecting the Pittsburgh Penguins and Philadelphia Flyers. The NBA and NHL seasons have since resumed with a modified schedule. The Pittsburgh Penguins were unexpectedly eliminated in the qualifying round, while the Flyers were eliminated in the second round of the playoffs by the New York Islanders. The 76ers completed the regular season after the restart and ended up as the 6 seed in the East; the 76ers were swept in the first round of the playoffs by the Boston Celtics. On June 24, 2020, it was announced that the 2020 MLB season of 60 games will begin July 23 and 24 with players returning to spring training on July 1.

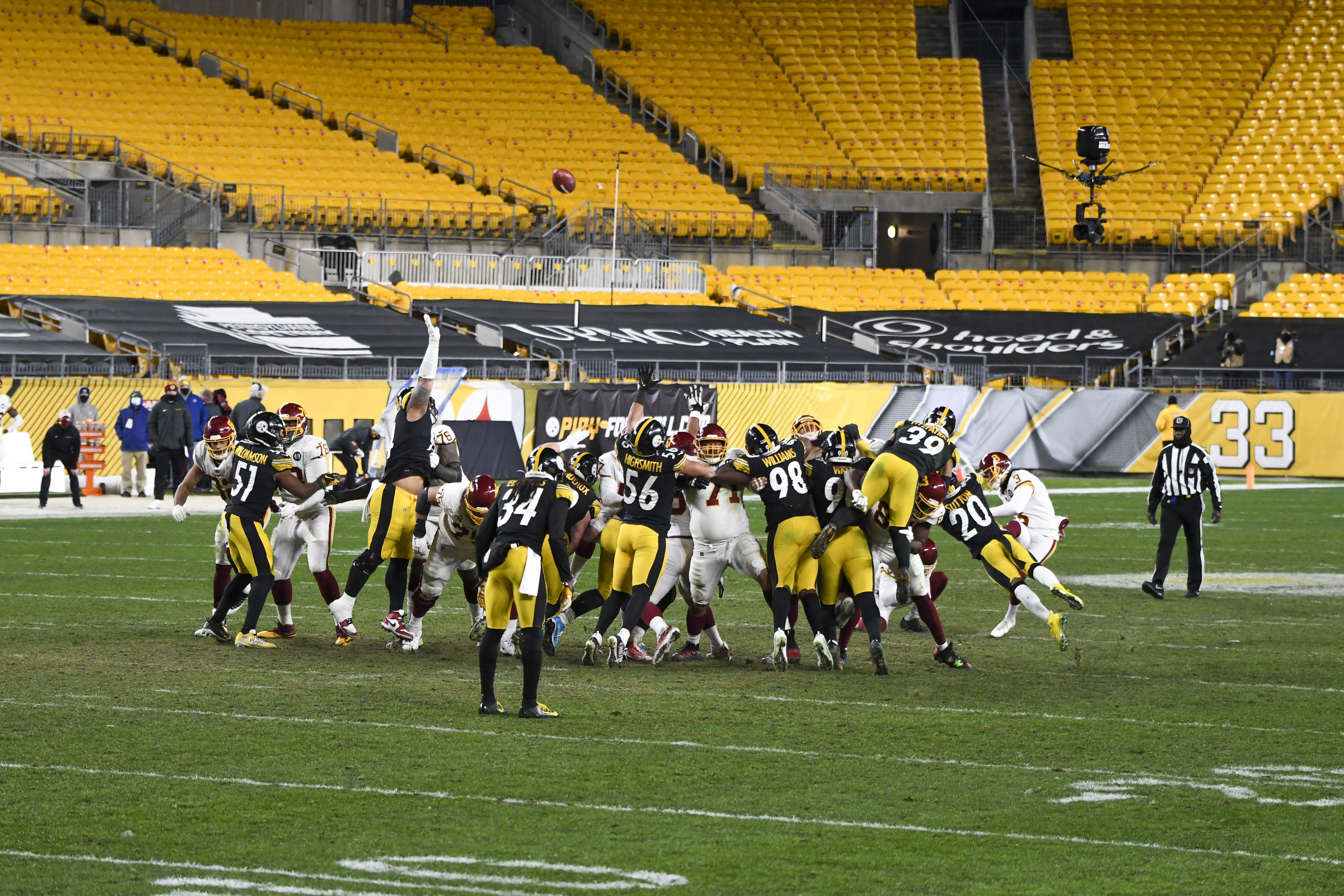
NFL game between the Pittsburgh Steelers and the Washington Football Team at Heinz Field in Pittsburgh without fans in attendance

On July 27, 2020, National Football League preseason games, which usually take place in August, were cancelled by NFL Commissioner Roger Goodell due to the COVID-19 pandemic, affecting the Philadelphia Eagles and the Pittsburgh Steelers. The regular season began as scheduled, although the Eagles and Steelers played behind closed doors for the first part of the season. The Steelers allowed a limited number of fans starting with their October 11, 2020 game against the Eagles while the Eagles allowed a limited number of fans starting with their October 18, 2020 game against the Baltimore Ravens. After the city of Philadelphia announced restrictions on November 16, 2020, due to a rise in cases, the Eagles were again not allowed to have any fans at games. After the state imposed restrictions on outdoor gatherings, the Steelers restricted attendance at games to family and friends of players and the organization starting with their December 2, 2020 game against the Ravens. The state originally planned to allow a limited number of spectators for the Steelers home playoff game(s). On January 7, 2021, the Steelers announced that attendance at home playoff game(s) would be limited to family and associates.

In college sports, the National Collegiate Athletic Association cancelled all winter and spring tournaments, most notably the Division I men's and women's basketball tournaments, affecting colleges and universities statewide. On March 16, 2020, the National Junior College Athletic Association also canceled the remainder of the winter seasons as well as the spring seasons. On August 11, the Big Ten Conference, which includes the Penn State Nittany Lions, postponed their fall 2020 sports seasons. On September 16, 2020, it was announced the 2020 football season will start on October 24 with an eight-game schedule. The Army–Navy Game, which was scheduled to take place at Lincoln Financial Field in Philadelphia on December 12, 2020, was moved to Michie Stadium on the grounds of the United States Military Academy in West Point, New York due to attendance limits on outdoor events imposed by the state.

In auto racing, the NASCAR race weekend at Pocono Raceway from June 26–28, 2020, which included the first NASCAR Cup Series doubleheader in history, took place as scheduled but without fans in attendance.

== Vaccination ==
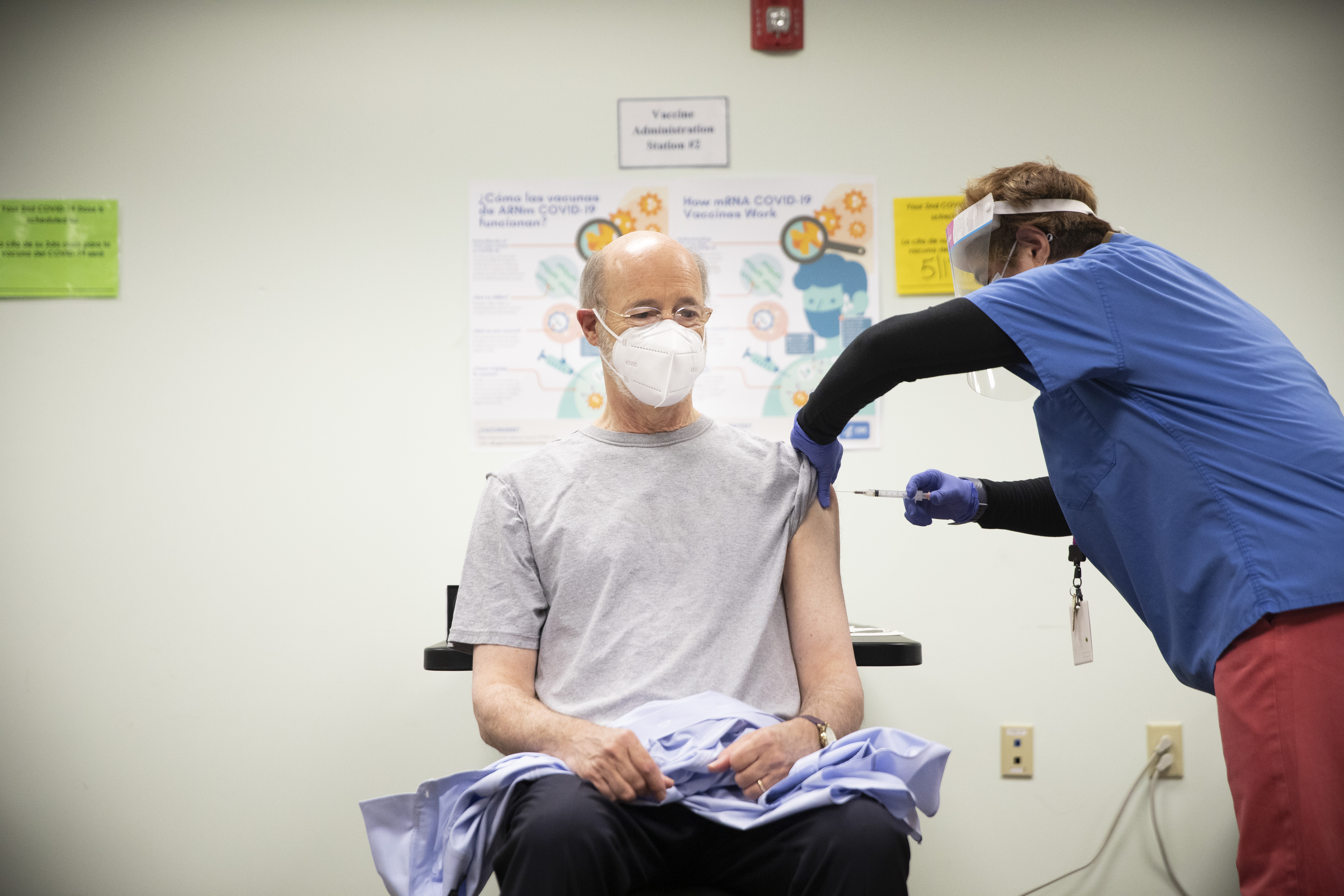
Governor Tom Wolf receives his first dose of the COVID-19 vaccine in York on April 19, 2021

The Pennsylvania Department of Health organized the state vaccine rollout into four phases. As of February 1, one million residents had received the vaccine.

=== Phase 1A ===
In the first phase, or Phase 1A, eligible persons included long-term care facility residents, health care personnel, persons exposed to infectious materials, persons aged 65 and older, and high-risk persons aged 16–64. Phase 1A began December 14, 2020, with the first vaccines being distributed to frontline healthcare workers in Pittsburgh.

=== Phase 1B ===
In Phase 1B, the following groups are eligible for the vaccine: individuals in group settings beyond long-term care, first responders, correctional officers, food and agricultural workers, U.S. postal workers, manufacturing workers, educators, clergy, public transit workers, and childcare professionals.

=== Phase 1C ===
In the third phase, essential workers in a number of sectors not already mentioned, including sectors such as transportation, energy, media, and legal services became eligible.

=== Phase 2 ===
In Phase 2, all (16 and older) persons not previously covered are eligible for the vaccine.

=== Challenges to rollout ===
As of January 2021, Pennsylvania ranks "second-to-last among the states in vaccine administration," a condition which has prompted state Republicans to criticize Democratic Governor Tom Wolf's management of the situation. Among other challenges, Wolf has cited a lack of supply from federal agencies in preventing quicker and more widespread inoculation. While older populations are targeted in Phase 1A, elderly residents of rural Pennsylvania in particular have had limited access to the vaccine, as limited supplies as inadequate facilities hinder the roll-out in these areas.

=== Graphs ===
View source data.
View source data.

== See also ==
- Timeline of the COVID-19 pandemic in the United States
- COVID-19 pandemic in the United States – for impact on the country
- COVID-19 pandemic – for impact on other countries
