= Todd Polinchock =

State Representative from Pennsylvania

Member of the Pennsylvania House of Representatives from the 144th district
- In office January 1, 2019 – January 3, 2023
- Preceded by: Kathy Watson
- Succeeded by: Brian Munroe

Personal details
- Born: August 16, 1963 (age 63) Hazleton, Pennsylvania, U.S.
- Party: Republican
- Children: 2
- Education: United States Naval Academy (BS)
- Website: https://reppolinchock.com

Todd Polinchock (born August 16, 1963) is a former representative of the 144th Legislative District of Pennsylvania, United States. He was first elected in 2018, winning against Democrat Meredith Buck.

== Early life and education ==
Polinchock was born on August 16, 1963 in Hazleton, Pennsylvania. He attended Whitehall High School, graduating in 1981, and graduated from the United States Naval Academy in 1985 with a bachelors in political science. He also attended Saint Joseph's University from 1992 to 1995.

After graduating from the Naval Academy, Polinchock began a 20 year career in the United States Navy, retiring in 2005.

== Career ==
After retiring from the military, he became a realtor, and was subsequently appointed as president of the Pennsylvania Association of Realtors in 2016. He was re-elected in 2020, then defeated in 2022 by Democrat Brian Munroe.

During his legislative term, Polinchook supported policies to stop climate change, becoming the first Republican to support a bill by fellow representative Chris Rabb designed to transition the commonwealth to complete renewable energy source use by 2050. In 2019, he introduced a bill allowing agritourism at small farms and orchards where local ordinances prohibited them.

During the COVID-19 pandemic, he stated that societal shutdowns were necessary to reduce the spread of the disease, but preferred giving control of measures to counties and thought the restrictions imposed by Governor Tom Wolf were too strict. Polinchock says he supports bipartisanship over partisan politics.

Polinchock sat on the Gaming Oversight, Human Services, Professional Licensure, and Veterans Affairs & Emergency Preparedness committees.

== Personal life ==
Polinchock has 2 children and is a Catholic.

== Electoral history ==
Pennsylvania 144th State House District General Election, 2018
Party	Candidate	Votes	%
Republican	Todd Polinchock	15,457	50.97
Democratic	Meredith Jean Buck	14,867	49.03
Total votes		30,324	100.0

Pennsylvania 144th State House District General Election, 2020
Party	Candidate	Votes	%
Republican	Todd Polinchock (incumbent)	22,915	55.5
Democratic	Gary P. Spillane	18,372	44.5
Total votes		41,287	100.0

Pennsylvania 144th State House District General Election, 2022
Party	Candidate	Votes	%
Democratic	Brian Munroe	16,123	50.81
Republican	Todd Polinchock (incumbent)	15,608	49.19
Total votes		31,731	100.0
