= Lorne Munroe =

American classical musician (1924–2020)

- Born: November 24, 1924; Winnipeg, Manitoba, Canada
- Died: May 4, 2020 (aged 95); Greater Philadelphia
- Education: Royal College of Music 1937-39: Curtis Institute 1939-42, 1945-1947 (Gap due to WWII service)
- Occupation: Cellist
- Employer: Juilliard
- Organizations: Philadelphia Orchestra; New York Philharmonic
- Spouse: Janée Gilbert (m. 1945)
- Children: 11
- Parent(s): Zoe and Wallace Munroe
- Relatives: Brian Munroe (Grandson)
- Awards: Naumberg Award
- Military career
- Allegiance: United States
- Branch: Infantry
- Service years: 1943 - 1945
- Conflicts: World War II; Battle of Bologna
- Awards: Purple Heart

Lorne Munroe (November 24, 1924 – May 4, 2020) was an American cellist. He was principal cellist of the Philadelphia Orchestra from 1951 to 1964 and principal cellist of the New York Philharmonic from 1964 to 1996. He was a featured soloist more than 150 times during the 32 seasons he played for the New York Philharmonic. His last performance with the orchestra as a member of the ensemble was on February 27, 1996; although he later returned as a guest artist.

== Early life ==
Munroe was born in Winnipeg, Manitoba, Canada in November 1924, the eldest of three children. His father, Wallace, was of Scottish origin and fought for Canada's expeditionary forces in World War I and was twice injured at Vimy Ridge on Easter Monday of 1917. His mother, Zoe (née Block), was an immigrant who left the Russian Empire in the early 20th Century having been born in Ekaterinoslav (now Dnipro), Ukraine. Early census records indicate that Zoe's family were Ukrainian Jewish refugees, as their first appearance, in the 1911 Canadian Census, lists "Jewish" as their designation under "Racial or tribal origin", while later records in 1916, 1921, and 1926 demonstrate that the family had begun reporting their ethnic origin as "Russian" and began alternating their surname between "Block" and "Black", though census takers in 1926 still noted that the family's mother tongue was "Jewish". When Lorne was three years old he learned to play the cello with his father's violin to which his teacher, Dezsö Mahelek, had attached a makeshift leg. He won the Winnipeg Music Competition festival at 10. At age 14, he was sponsored by composer Arthur Benjamin to attend the Royal College of Music in London in 1937–39. In his final year, he played with Benjamin a piece the composer wrote for Munroe. He continued his studies in Philadelphia at the Curtis Institute of Music, where he was a student of cellist Gregor Piatigorsky and Orlando Cole.

== Military service ==
In 1943, barely into adulthood, he enlisted in the US Army Infantry at the apex of the Second World War. Serving as a machine gunner at the Battle of Bologna, he was wounded, taking a sniper's bullet to the back of the leg. Before being evacuated from the battlefield for medical treatment, he packed the injury with mud to stanch bleeding and continued engaging with enemy targets. The incident would earn him a Purple Heart.

== Career ==
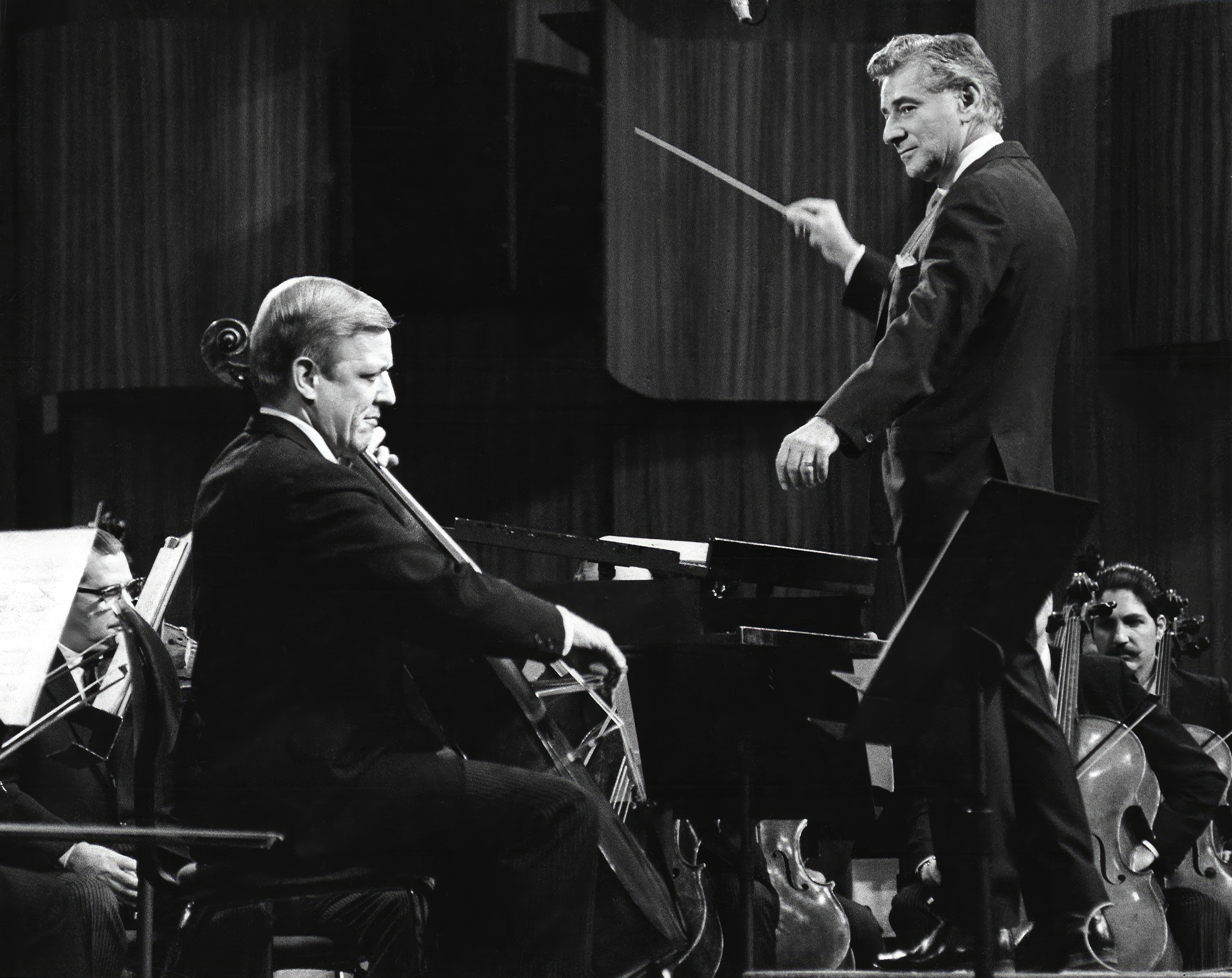
Lorne Munroe and Leonard Bernstein, New York Philharmonic Young People's Concerts, December 1968

After his military service, he continued his studies and graduated from Curtis. In 1949, he was the sole winner of the Naumburg award and made his recital debut in New York in November of that year. In 1949-50, he performed with the Cleveland Orchestra, before taking two positions as principal cello, first with the Minneapolis Symphony Orchestra in 1950–51, and the Philadelphia Orchestra in 1951.

In 1964, he was invited by Leonard Bernstein to become the principal cellist of the New York Philharmonic. This period also saw him performing as a soloist. One such occasion was during a Young People's Concert broadcast aired Christmas Day, 1968, in a performance of Richard Strauss' Don Quixote.

There were many such solo performances in (1965, 1968, 1971, 1973), when he performed with the Naumburg Orchestral Concerts, in the Naumburg Bandshell, Central Park, in the summer series.

He also taught at the Juilliard School and at the Philadelphia Musical Academy (now University of the Arts).

== Personal life ==
In 1945, he married violist Janée Munroe in Paris while serving in the military during World War II, with whom he had 10 sons and one daughter. They maintained their primary residence in the Philadelphia suburb of Wynnewood, Pennsylvania, along with a condominium in New York City to accommodate his position with the philharmonic. Janée died in her sleep September 10, 2006, at their lakeside home in Warren, Maine.

Lorne Munroe died in May 2020 at the age of 95.
