= Jean Wilson (politician) =

American politician

Member of the Pennsylvania House of Representatives from the 144th district
- In office 1991–1992
- Preceded by: Benjamin H. Wilson
- Succeeded by: Thomas W. Druce

Personal details
- Born: Jean Lennox; June 13, 1928 Philadelphia, Pennsylvania
- Died: January 27, 2014 (aged 85) Doylestown, Pennsylvania
- Party: Republican
- Spouse: Benjamin H. Wilson

Jean Louise Lennox Wilson (June 13, 1928 – January 27, 2014) was a Republican member of the Pennsylvania House of Representatives.

Elected in 1988, after placing her name on the ballot following the death of her husband, Benjamin H. Wilson, an eleven-term member of the Pennsylvania House who had died nine months before that year's election, she represented the 144th District.

== Formative years ==
Born in Philadelphia, Pennsylvania on June 13, 1928, as Jean Louise Lennox, she graduated from Frankford High School in 1945, and earned a bachelor of science degree in education from Pennsylvania State University.

She was married to Benjamin H. Wilson, a fellow Penn State graduate and realtor who became the tax collector for Warminster Township, Pennsylvania, in 1980 and then a member of the Pennsylvania House of Representatives.

== Academic and business career ==
Following her graduation from Penn State, Wilson became an educator. She subsequently worked for two years as an executive secretary with Publicker Industries, and then as an office manager with Camden Fibre Mills for ten years.

== Public service career ==
Appointed as the assistant tax collector for Warminster Township, she served in that capacity for ten years.

A member of the Bucks County Council of Republican Women, she was elected as a Republican to the Pennsylvania House of Representatives for the 1989 and 1991 terms, but was not a candidate for reelection to the House for the 1993 term.

During her tenure in the Pennsylvania House, she was pro-choice and an advocate for increased daycare services for children as a way to help working parents, but voted against a parental leave bill in September 1990, which was designed to give workers up to twelve weeks of unpaid leave per year for childbirth or medical emergencies, stating her belief that it would "hurt small businesses by mandating leaves."

She also served on the boards of directors of the Bucks County Fox Chase Cancer Center and the VIA, Doylestown Hospital.

== Death ==
Wilson died on January 27, 2014, in Doylestown, Pennsylvania.
