= Benjamin H. Wilson =

American politician

Member of the Pennsylvania House of Representatives from the 144th district
- In office 1969–1988
- Preceded by: District created
- Succeeded by: Jean Wilson

Member of the Pennsylvania House of Representatives from the Bucks County district
- In office 1967–1968

Personal details
- Born: January 25, 1925 Mount Carmel, Pennsylvania
- Died: March 6, 1988 (aged 63) Eleuthora Island, the Bahamas
- Party: Republican
- Spouse: Jean Wilson
- Children: two daughters

Benjamin H. Wilson (January 25, 1925 – March 6, 1988) was a Republican member of the Pennsylvania House of Representatives.

== Biography ==
Wilson was the chairman of the House Finance Committee and was seeking re-election for a twelfth term when he died of a heart attack while on vacation. His widow, Jean Wilson, succeeded him in office.

Before being elected to the State House, Wilson served as Warminster Township Tax Collector and in 1980, made one bid for statewide office, auditor general, losing by a narrow margin in the GOP primary to a fellow state representative, James Knepper, who lost in the general election.

Wilson graduated from the Pennsylvania State University with a degree in mathematics, and owned a real estate brokerage firm.

The Benjamin H. Wilson Senior Center in Warminster Township is named after Wilson.

He died in office in 1988.
