= Brian Munroe =

American politician

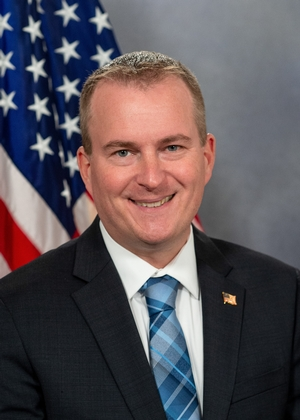
- Official portrait, 2023

Member of the Pennsylvania House of Representatives from the 144th district
- Incumbent
- Assumed office January 3, 2023
- Preceded by: Todd Polinchock

Personal details
- Born: January 25, 1974 (age 52)
- Party: Democratic
- Relations: Lorne Munroe (Grandfather)
- Education: Conestoga High School; West Chester University
- Occupation: Politician • police officer
- Website: pahouse.com/munroe

Military service
- Branch/service: United States Navy
- Unit: USS Theodore Roosevelt
- Awards: National Defense Service Medal; Armed Forces Service Medal; NATO Medal

Brian Munroe (born January 25, 1974) is a Democratic member of the Pennsylvania House of Representatives, representing the 144th District since 2023.

Munroe attended Conestoga High School, and volunteered as a firefighter and emergency medical technician with the Berwyn Fire Company as a teenager. After attending West Chester University, he enlisted in the United States Navy at age 20 and served aboard the USS Theodore Roosevelt. His military decorations included the Armed Forces Service Medal, National Defense Service Medal and the National America Treaty Organization Medal. Following his military service, he served as a police officer in Radnor Township (2001–2011).

In 2012, Munroe unsuccessfully ran for the Pennsylvania House of Representatives in the 29th District, losing to Republican incumbent Bernie O'Neill. He was later elected a Warminster Township Supervisor in 2015 and Bucks County Clerk of Courts in 2019.

In 2022, Munroe successfully challenged Republican incumbent Todd Polinchock for Pennsylvania's 144th House District, defeating Polinchock by 515 votes.

In 2024, Munroe was re-elected to the State House by 1,065 votes, or 51.3% of the vote over Bucks County Recorder of Deeds Republican Dan McPhillips.

Representative Brian Munroe is the Grandson of famed New York philharmonic former lead cellist Lorne Munroe.

== Political positions ==
=== Abortion rights ===
Munroe is a pro-choice candidate and opposes the Supreme Court's overturning of Roe v. Wade in 2022. He believes the government has no right to interfere in women's decisions about abortion.

=== Environment ===
Munroe prioritizes clean drinking water in his district, particularly in Warminster Township as well as protecting local farms from invasive species and unchecked development and lack of storm water mitigation. Additionally, he wants to invest in renewable energy for the district.

=== Gun safety ===
As a former police officer, Munroe believes in the right to responsibly own guns and supports training courses on usage, handling, and storage to save lives. He also supports expanding mental health treatment to stop preventable deaths.

=== Healthcare ===
Munroe believes mental health care is a human right and that that there is a mental health epidemic in this country with long wait times for those who seek treatment. As a representative, has committed to advocate for more access to affordable mental healthcare.

=== Equality ===
Munroe supports the passage of the Equality Act, which was proposed during the 117th United States Congress, but never implemented. He supports the LGBTQ community.

=== Economic issues ===
Munroe supports raising the minimum wage to a living wage and reforming laws for service workers so they are not so reliant on tips.

=== Tax policy ===
Munroe believes that Pennsylvania should implement a natural gas extraction fee to lower taxes on local homeowners. He supports something akin to a 7% extraction fee on natural gas companies that frack in the commonwealth.

=== Education ===
Munroe believes in investing in all levels of education to ensure college remains affordable and K through 12 education remains high quality for all children. He believes that the state needs to change how Charter Schools, particularly online charter schools, are approved.

On student debt, Munroe wants to explore free Community College and Student Loan Debt Relief.

Political offices
Pennsylvania House of Representatives
| Preceded by Todd Polinchock | Member of the Pennsylvania House of Representatives from the 144th district 2023–present | Incumbent |
