= Thomas W. Druce =

American politician

Thomas William Druce

Member of the Pennsylvania House of Representatives from the 144th district
- In office January 5, 1993 – September 25, 2000
- Preceded by: Jean Wilson
- Succeeded by: Katharine M. Watson

Personal details
- Born: June 18, 1961 (age 65) Philadelphia, Pennsylvania, U.S.
- Party: Republican
- Spouse: Amy Schreiber (divorced)
- Children: 3 boys
- Education: Westminster College
- Occupation: Legislator
- Criminal information
- Convictions: Hit and run; Insurance fraud; Evidence tampering
- Penalty: Served 2 years of a 2 – 4 year sentence

Details
- Imprisoned at: State Correctional Institution – Laurel Highlands, Somerset, Pennsylvania

Thomas William Druce (born June 18, 1961) is a former Republican member of the Pennsylvania House of Representatives. He represented the 144th legislative district in Bucks County, Pennsylvania.

== Early life and education ==
Druce was born in Philadelphia on June 18, 1961. He graduated from William Tennent High School in Warminster, Pennsylvania in 1979 and from Westminster College in New Wilmington, Pennsylvania in 1983.

== Career ==
Druce was elected to the Pennsylvania House of Representatives in 1993, and served for four terms.

As of February 2020, according to information Druce posted on his LinkedIn site, he worked as the principal of Phoenix Strategy Group, "a research and public policy firm" and does business development for Pennsylvania Water Specialties Company.

== Hit and run killing and conviction ==
In July 1999, while driving, Druce struck and killed 42-year-old Harrisburg pedestrian Kenneth Cains, a former U.S. Marine.

After attempting to cover his tracks by repairing his Jeep SUV, filing a false accident claim with his insurance company, and lying to police, Druce eventually pled guilty to a hit and run for leaving the scene of an accident, insurance fraud, and tampering with evidence.

Although he admitted to a night of drinking before the hit-and-run, he was able to avoid additional drunk driving charges because too much time had passed to test his blood-alcohol level. He was sentenced to two to four years at SCI Laurel Highlands, and was released in 2006.

=== In popular culture ===
In 2006, the crime was the subject of an episode of Forensic Files titled "Capitol Crimes".
