= Pennsylvania House of Representatives, District 144 =

American legislative district

Pennsylvania's 144th State House of Representatives district
Representative
Brian Munroe; D–Warminster Township
- Population (2022) • Citizens of voting age: 65,208; 52,141

The 144th Pennsylvania House of Representatives District is located in Southeastern Pennsylvania and has been represented since 2023 by Democrat Brian Munroe.

== District profile ==
The 144th Pennsylvania House of Representatives District is located in Bucks County. It is made up of the following areas:

- Ivyland
- New Britain Township (PART)
  - South Division 01 & 02
- Warminster Township
- Warrington Township

== Representatives ==
Representative	Party	Years	District home	Note
Prior to 1969, seats were apportioned by county.
Benjamin H. Wilson	Republican	1969 – 1988	Warmister Township	Became House Finance Committee Chairman
Jean Wilson	Republican	1988 – 1992	New Britain Township	Succeeded husband on his death in 1990
Thomas W. Druce	Republican	1993 – 2000		Resigned on September 25, 2000.
Katharine M. Watson	Republican	2001 – 2019	Warrington Township	
Todd Polinchock	Republican	2019 – 2023	Warrington Township	
Brian Munroe	Democrat	2023 – present	Warminster Township	Incumbent

== Recent election results ==
PA House election, 2024: Pennsylvania House, District 144
Party	Candidate	Votes	%
Democratic	Brian Munroe (incumbent)	20,553	51.33
Republican	Daniel McPhillips	19,488	48.67
Total votes		40,041	100.00
Democratic hold			

PA House election, 2022: Pennsylvania House, District 144
Party	Candidate	Votes	%
Democratic	Brian Munroe	16,123	50.81
Republican	Todd Polinchock (incumbent)	15,608	49.19
Total votes		31,731	100.00
Democratic gain from Republican			

PA House election, 2020: Pennsylvania House, District 144
Party	Candidate	Votes	%
Republican	Todd Polinchock (incumbent)	22,915	55.50
Democratic	Gary Spillane	18,372	44.50
Total votes		41,287	100.00
Republican hold			

PA House election, 2018: Pennsylvania House, District 144
Party	Candidate	Votes	%
Republican	Todd Polinchock	15,457	50.97
Democratic	Meredith Jean Buck	14,867	49.03
Total votes		30,324	100.00
Republican hold			

PA House election, 2016: Pennsylvania House, District 144
Party	Candidate	Votes	%
Republican	Katharine Watson (incumbent)	Unopposed	
Total votes		25,243	100.00
Republican hold			

PA House election, 2014: Pennsylvania House, District 144
Party	Candidate	Votes	%
Republican	Katharine Watson (incumbent)	Unopposed	
Total votes		14,907	100.00
Republican hold			

PA House election, 2012: Pennsylvania House, District 144
Party	Candidate	Votes	%
Republican	Katharine Watson (incumbent)	Unopposed	
Total votes		25,604	100.00
Republican hold			

PA House election, 2010: Pennsylvania House, District 144
Party	Candidate	Votes	%
Republican	Katharine Watson (incumbent)	Unopposed	
Total votes		19,132	100.00
Republican hold			
