= Kathy Watson =

American politician (born 1945)

Katharine M. Watson

Member of the Pennsylvania House of Representatives from the 144th district
- In office January 2, 2001 – January 1, 2019
- Preceded by: Thomas W. Druce
- Succeeded by: Todd Polinchock

Personal details
- Born: November 6, 1945 (age 80) Danville, Pennsylvania, U.S.
- Party: Republican
- Education: University of Pennsylvania (BA); Villanova University
- Occupation: Teacher
- Website: http://kathywatson144.com

Katharine M. "Kathy" Watson (born November 6, 1945) is a former representative of the 144th Legislative District of Pennsylvania, United States. She served on the House Aging and Older Adult Services, Ethics, Health and Human Services, Liquor Control and Transportation Committees and was chairman of the House Subcommittee on Care and Services and the House Subcommittee on Transportation Safety. She was also a member of the House Republican Policy Committee.

== Early life and education ==
Watson was born on November 6, 1945 in Danville in Montour County, Pennsylvania. Upon graduating from Springfield High School in 1963, she attended the University of Pennsylvania, obtaining a bachelors in English in 1967. She conducted graduate work in secondary guidance and counseling at Villanova University from 1973 to 1976.

== Career ==
Watson has extensive experience working in local government. She served as Director of Public Information and subsequently as Deputy Administrator for Bucks County. She was also a Township Supervisor and a member of the Central Bucks School Board. Watson also served as the founder and first director of the Bucks County Highway Safety Program.

Watson was previously a high school English teacher for Springfield High School in Delaware County and also operated a home-based public relations firm, Coleraine Consultants, P.R.

== Personal ==
Watson and her husband resided in Warrington Township, Bucks County and have one adult son, Derek. ref name="Profile" />
