= Pennsylvania System of School Assessment =

Standardized test in Pennsylvania, US

The Pennsylvania System of School Assessment (PSSA) is the standardized test administered in all public schools in the state of Pennsylvania. Students from grades 3-8 are assessed in English language arts (ELA) skills and mathematics. Students in grades 5 and 8 are also assessed in skills relating to natural science, including the field of data interpretation and analysis. Since 2013, high school students have taken the Keystone Exam in place of the PSSA for their standardized testing. The PSSA's were made by a company in New Jersey. The PSSA is written, owned and administered by Pearson Education. There are reporting categories for each subject which list eligible content to be tested in each grade. Assessment Anchors specify what is considered eligible content for each grade level tested. A Proficient or Advanced level is needed to be able to qualify as passing the PSSA.

== Underlying Principles ==
The PSSA applies to all public schools and districts, including charter schools and cyber charter schools. The questions are based on the Common Core Standards and content expectations. The goal was to have 100% of students proficient or above in reading and math by 2014.

== Scoring ==
There are four levels on which a student may score: advanced, proficient, basic, and below basic. The Pennsylvania Department of Education defines the four levels as follows.

=== Advanced ===
The Advanced Level reflects superior academic performance and excellent work ethic. Advanced work indicates an in-depth understanding and exemplary display of the skills included in the Pennsylvania Academic Content Standards.

=== Proficient ===
The Proficient Level reflects satisfactory academic performance. Proficient work indicates a solid understanding and adequate display of the skills included in the Pennsylvania Academic Content Standards.

=== Basic ===
The Basic Level reflects marginal academic performance. Basic work indicates a partial understanding and limited display of the skills included in the Pennsylvania Academic Content Standards. This work is approaching satisfactory performance, but has not been reached. There is a need for additional instructional opportunities and/or increased student academic commitment to achieve the Proficient Level.

=== Below Basic ===
The Below Basic Level reflects inadequate academic performance. Below Basic work indicates little understanding and minimal display of the skills included in the Pennsylvania Academic Content Standards. There is a major need for additional instructional opportunities and/or increased student academic commitment to achieve the Proficient Level.

== Adequate Yearly Progress ==
Districts must meet Adequate Yearly Progress (AYP) in reading and math. To make AYP, the school and district must meet target percentages with all students, as well as with every subgroup of 40 or more students, scoring at the Advanced or Proficient level.

Schools which fail to meet AYP for two consecutive years are subject to sanctions, such as loss of funding and restaffing. Subgroups include: Economically Disadvantaged (Title I), Limited English proficiency, Students with Individualized Education Programs, Hispanic Americans, Native Americans, African Americans, Asian Americans, White Students, and Multi-racial/Multi-ethnic Students.

== Reporting Categories ==
Math reporting categories include numbers and operations, measurement, geometry, algebraic concepts, and data analysis and probability. Reading reporting categories include reading comprehension skills as well as interpreting and analysis fiction and nonfiction texts. Science reporting categories include the nature of science, biological sciences, physical sciences, and earth and space sciences. On July 1, 2010, the State Board of Education adopted the Common Core State Standards in Mathematics, which will replace the Mathematics standards adopted in 1999. In July 2010, the Board also adopted the Common Core State Standards in English Language Arts, which will replace the Reading, Writing, Speaking and Listening standards adopted in 1999. The regulations providing for these new academic content standards took effect upon their publication in the October 16, 2010 edition of the Pennsylvania Bulletin. The transition to Common Core began during the 2010-11 school year, and it was fully implemented by July 1, 2013.

- Common Core State Standards for Mathematics
- Common Core State Standards in English Language Arts
