= Keystone Exam =

Standardized test in Pennsylvania, United States

The Keystone Exam is a Pennsylvania standardized test administered to the public schools of Pennsylvania, United States. The test has been developed by the Commonwealth of Pennsylvania Department of Education. Since the 2012–2013 school year, the General Keystone Knowledge Test Literature, Biology, and Algebra I VHS Exams have been available. According to the Department of Education, groups of educators from across the state decided what content should be covered in the exams. Due to the Coronavirus Pandemic, the 2020 spring Keystones and PSSA testing were cancelled.

== Transition ==
The Keystone Exam has replaced the Pennsylvania System of School Assessment (PSSA) standardized tests fully for all public school students for secondary school. They were introduced in 2010. In the 2012–2013 school year, secondary schools began the transition from the PSSA to the Keystone Exam.

== Graduation Requirement ==
The passing of Keystone Exams in Algebra I, Biology, and Literature were all a graduation requirement for all high school students. Getting a score of "proficient" or higher was needed in order to pass the exam for a particular subject matter. On February 3, 2016, Tom Wolf signed a bill from the Senate saying that it should no longer be a requirement for students to pass the exams in the desired subject areas. That also ordered the government to halt the graduation requirement of the Keystone Exams for two years along with the "Project Based Assessment" system. The bill also requires the government to find alternative methods for high school graduation requirements in the coming months.
