= Blackout Wednesday =

Thanksgiving Eve

- Observed by: United States of America
- Date: fourth Wednesday in November

Blackout Wednesday (also known as Dranksgiving) refers to binge drinking on the night before the Thanksgiving holiday in the United States. Very few people work on Thanksgiving, and most college students are home with their families for the Thanksgiving holiday, which means that high school friends can catch up at the local bar as they converge on their hometown.

Blacking out is a slang term for unconsciousness and/or memory loss due to excessive alcohol intoxication. In some Chicago suburbs like Elmhurst, Highwood, Naperville, and Rockford, Blackout Wednesday can be a more popular party night than New Year's Eve or Saint Patrick's Day.

In some cities, it is the worst drunk driving night of the year, and police departments increase patrols checking for drunk driving in many jurisdictions including in Indiana and Minnesota. MADD reports that the Thanksgiving holiday produces more people killed in drunk driving crashes than the Christmas holiday.

The term "Dranksgiving" dates to 2007. The phenomenon is believed to have originated decades before terms were coined to describe it.
